= Horace Ezra Bixby =

American steamboat pilot

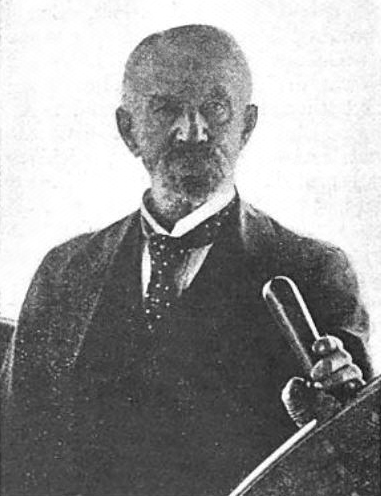
- Born: May 8, 1826; Geneseo, New York, US
- Died: August 1, 1912 (aged 86); Maplewood, Missouri, US
- Resting place: Bellefontaine Cemetery, St. Louis, Missouri, US
- Occupation(s): Steamboat pilot, steamboat captain, inventor
- Years active: 1848–1912
- Spouses: Susan Weibling (m. 1859–1867) Mary Sheble (m. 1869–1912)
- Children: Edwina, Edwin, George Mason

Horace Ezra Bixby (May 8, 1826 – August 1, 1912) was a steamboat pilot on the Mississippi-Missouri-Ohio river system from the late 1840s until his death in 1912. Bixby is notable in his own right for his high standing in his profession, for his technical contributions to it, and for his service in the American Civil War. However, he is best known for having had as his "cub pilot" (that is, apprentice or trainee) the young man known to him as Sam Clemens, later to become famous under his pen name as American author Mark Twain. Twain's descriptions of Bixby's character and pedagogic style form a good part of his memoir Life on the Mississippi, and it was through this medium that Bixby—much to his annoyance—became well-known beyond the circles of his family, friends and profession.

== Early life ==
Horace Bixby was born in Geneseo, New York, a town near Rochester in the Finger Lakes region of New York, on May 8, 1826, to Sylvanus and Hanna Bixby. While still in his teens, he left home and moved to Cincinnati, Ohio where he first worked in a tailor's shop, and then became a mud clerk on the packet boat Olivia. Within two years, he had become the Olivia's pilot.

== Pre-Civil War career ==
As Twain describes at length in Life on the Mississippi, a rare combination of skills and talents, honed to perfection and maintained there by unremitting drill, was required in the mid-nineteenth century, in order to safely navigate a steamboat on the Mississippi and the Missouri, "vast streams...whose alluvial banks cave and change constantly, whose snags are always hunting up new quarters, whose sandbars are never at rest, whose channels are for ever dodging and shirking, and whose obstructions must be confronted in all nights and all weathers without [at that time] the aid of a single light-house or a single buoy." The pilot needed to have total, perfect, and instantaneous recall for every detail of the river's meandering and ever-changing channel, with its chutes, islands, sandbars, underwater rocks, "reefs", snags, and sunken wrecks. He needed to be able to intuit exactly how any rise or fall in the river would affect its minimum depth at hundreds of shoal places, and know how to read the surface of the water "like a book." Finally, and most importantly, the successful pilot required "good and quick judgment and decision, and a cool, calm courage that no peril can shake." Successful pilots were able to command a salary variously reported as six times that of a clergyman and greater than that of the Vice President of the United States. In this demanding profession, Horace Bixby was an acknowledged master.

A steamboat's pilot had not only to keep the boat safe from navigational hazards, but also to complete each journey in the shortest possible time. The unusually good speed that he was able to make without compromising safety earned him the title "Lightning" Bixby. Switzer attributes this sobriquet to his having once completed the voyage from New Orleans to St. Louis in only 4 days, 14 hours and 20 minutes. Twain recounts an incident in which Bixby saved his steamboat a full night's delay by a tour de force of piloting, prompting another pilot aboard at the time to exclaim, "By the Shadow of Death, but he's a lightning pilot!"

Bixby was also unusual in that he held a pilot's licence for all three of the major inland waterways—the lower Mississippi, the Missouri, and the Ohio—rather than only for one, as was the case with most pilots. Piloting on the Missouri during Bixby's first years there (1856–58) presented special challenges due to the undeveloped nature of the country through which it passed; a steamboat might find its forward progress impeded "by buffalo herds crossing the river one day and by Sioux warriors the next."

A partial list of the boats on which Bixby was employed as pilot during this period includes Olivia, Hungarian, Paul Jones, Colonel Crossman, Crescent City, Rufus J. Lackland, William M. Morrison, New Falls City, and Aleck Scott. Bixby's time on the Colonel Crossman included an explosion in which 14 people were killed.

== Early relationship with Twain ==
Bixby first met Twain in February 1857, when the latter was 21 years old. Twain was traveling to New Orleans on the Paul Jones, on the way to South America, where he planned to raise coca, a legal crop at the time, as the process of extracting cocaine from it had not yet been invented. However, he had harbored a boyhood dream of becoming a river pilot, which he decided to make one more effort to pursue. After some negotiations, Bixby agreed to teach him the lower Mississippi for $500, of which $100 was paid in advance and the balance was to be paid out of his salary after becoming a pilot. As it happened, Twain was able to pay only $300 before the outbreak of the Civil War shut down all commercial traffic on the Mississippi. He and Bixby agreed between them to cancel the remaining balance. For much of the next two years, Twain served his apprenticeship under Bixby, though occasionally his mentor placed him with other pilots, such as during the period when Bixby was learning, and working on, the Missouri River. After Twain got his licence, the two of them worked together as pilots on the Crescent City and the New Falls City. In Life on the Mississippi, Twain portrays Bixby as an "irascible but lovable mentor."

One point on which Bixby's friends took issue with Twain was his portrayal of Bixby as "a profane man," that is, as someone who occasionally used profanity for emphasis in conversation. They reported him to be a person who was always "gentle of speech." Note however that there was a difference in the etiquette of shore-based discourse and that on board a vessel, where the use of bad language by the crew (among themselves) was commonplace, and even expected.

== Civil War service ==
Horace Bixby served as pilot of the USS Benton from October 25, 1861 until August 28, 1862. The Benton was the flagship of the Mississippi River Squadron, and both Twain and Bixby's obituary refer to him as having been the squadron's "Chief Pilot" at the time of the First Battle of Memphis. Bixby's obituary states that he "always held the Union victory at Memphis due to the information he gave Commodore Foote."

== Post-war career ==
Horace Bixby was one of the pilots of the steamboat Bertrand, which sank on April 1, 1865, after hitting a snag in the Missouri River, north of Omaha, Nebraska, in what was to become the DeSoto National Wildlife Refuge. The wreck of the Bertrand was excavated in 1968, and much of its cargo as survived—over 500,000 artifacts—are on display at the museum of the DeSoto National Wildlife Refuge near Missouri Valley, Iowa.

In the last few decades of his life, Bixby worked on the river both as pilot and as captain. (A captain was in charge of all aspects of his boat's management except for its navigation while underway, which was the exclusive province of the pilot on duty, and in which the captain was forbidden to interfere.) During much of this period, Bixby worked as a captain for the Anchor Line, and owned more stock in the company than any other employee, having heavily invested in one of its predecessor companies.

Together with George Richey, Bixby was granted a patent for a new type of binnacle light in 1871. This invention was part of a larger project to improve the safety of navigation on the river. As described by Twain, "Horace Bixby and George Ritchie [sic] have charted the crossings and laid out the courses by compass; they have invented a lamp to go with the chart, and have patented the whole. With these helps, one may run [the boat] in the fog now, with considerable security, and with a confidence unknown in the old days."

A partial list of the boats on which Bixby served during this period, and the positions he held, includes City of Natchez (Master, 1885-1886), Crystal City (Captain, 1887), City of Hickman (Master, 1890), City of Alton (Captain), and City of Baton Rouge (Master). Bixby was a part-owner of the City of Alton, having purchased it in partnership with his father-in-law and two other men.

Bixby remained professionally active until the very end of his life. His final command assignment, of the government snagboat Horatio G. Wright, was completed on July 30, 1912. He was awaiting a call to take out the government tugboat Nokomis when he died two days later, in Maplewood, Missouri, on August 1. As his obituary stated, "He died as he often said he wished to die, 'in the harness.'"

== Later relationship with Twain ==
When Twain returned to the Mississippi River, in the spring of 1882, to collect material for the later chapters of Life on the Mississippi, Bixby was happy to meet him in New Orleans. By all evidence, they remained life-long friends.

Although it appears that Bixby did not greatly blame Twain for his portrayal of him, the charm of being associated with him in the public mind, and of being pestered by reporters for yet more details about their time together, quickly paled. Bixby's obituary states that "Captain Bixby received hundreds of letters from strangers, who knew him solely through Mark Twain's books. This became distasteful to him, and during late years he had avoided all mention of Mark Twain's name." Waterways Journal of April 30, 1910 reports that, "In Memphis one time, [Bixby] told a reporter that he wished Mark Twain were dead so he wouldn't be bothered in retailing reminiscences about him longer. He was annoyed when the remark was printed, but there is no record that Mark Twain ever heard of it, and if he had, it was just the sort of a whimsicality that he would have appreciated."

== Family and portrait ==
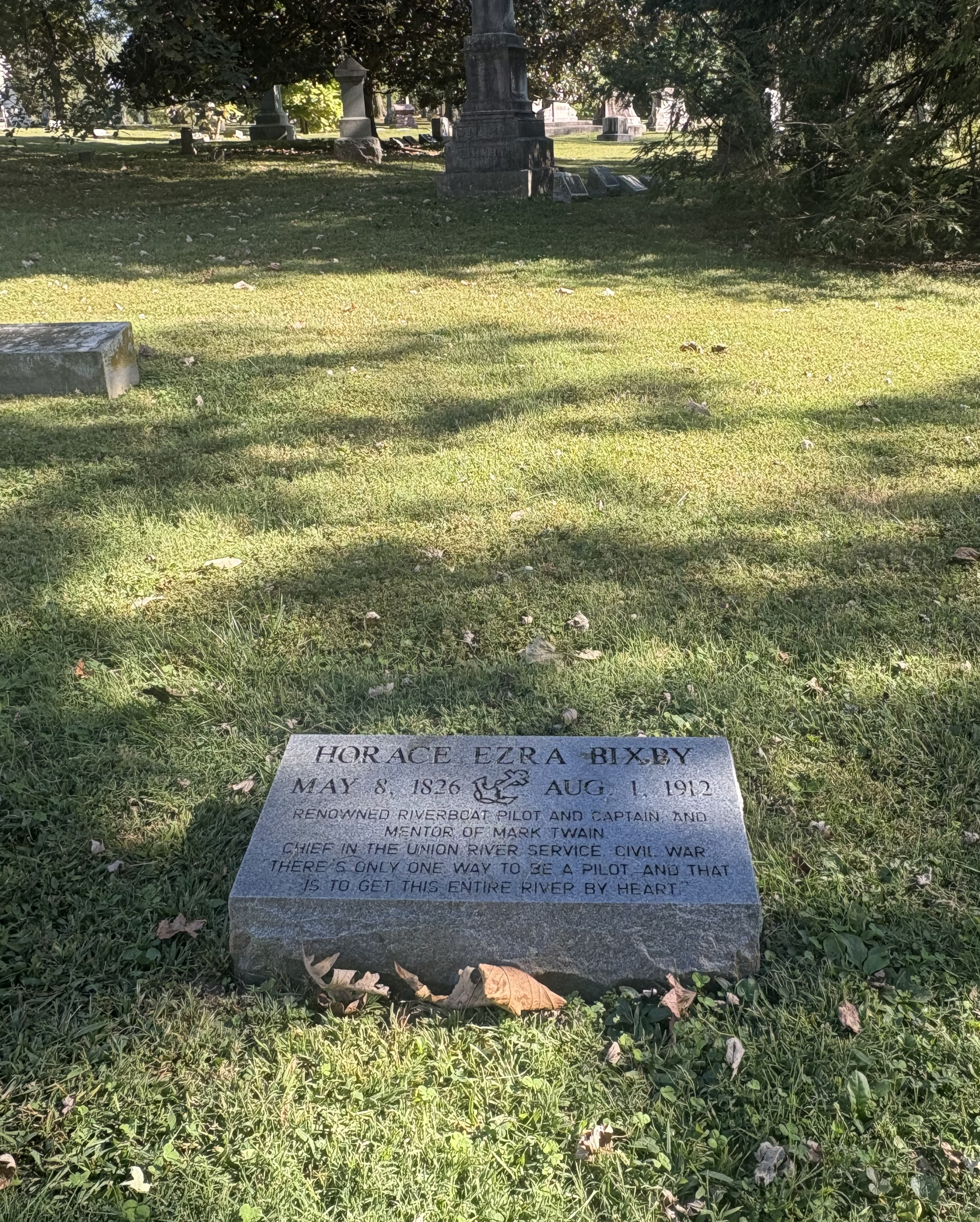
Bixby's grave at Bellefontaine Cemetery

Bixby was first married to Susan Weibling of New Orleans. According to Switzer, the marriage took place in 1853, but other sources date it in 1860. They had no children who survived infancy, and she died in 1867. In 1869, he married Mary Sheble, daughter of Captain Edwin A. Sheble of St. Louis, with whom he had three children, a daughter, Edwina, and two sons, Edwin and George Mason. Edwina married Dr. Louis T. Pim in 1901, and by 1910 Horace and Mary had come to live with them. Mary Bixby survived her husband by nine years, dying in 1921. The two of them are buried in Bellefontaine Cemetery in St. Louis, Missouri.

A portrait photograph of Horace Bixby may be viewed in the collection of UW-La Crosse.

== Portrayal in media ==
Horace Bixby was portrayed by Robert Barrat in the 1944 film The Adventures of Mark Twain, by Robert Lansing in the Great Performances episode Life on the Mississippi, and by Doug Mancheski in the American Folklore Theatre production of the musical Life on the Mississippi.
