= DeSoto Lake (Iowa–Nebraska) =

Artificial lake in Iowa and Nebraska, US

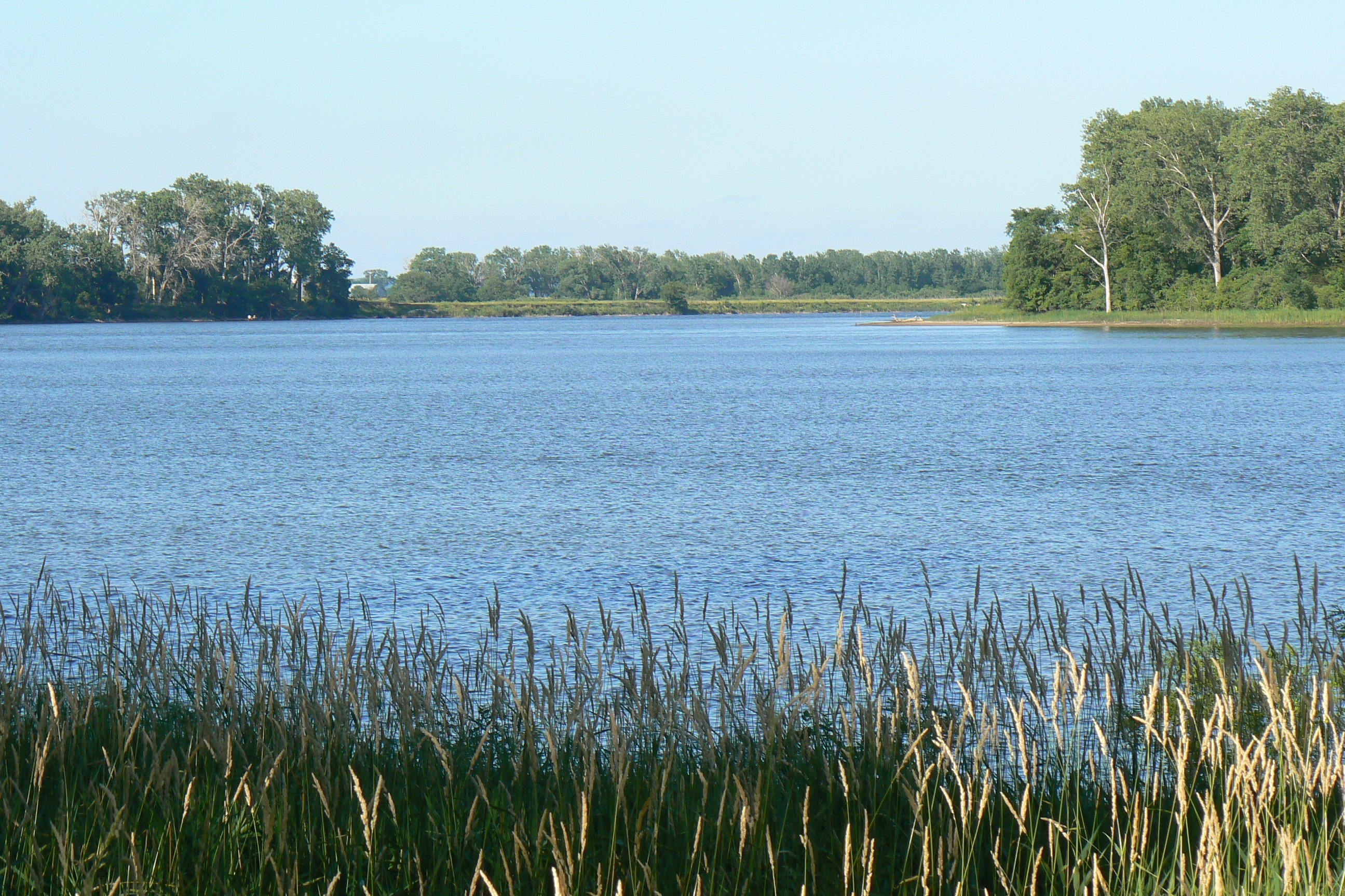
- DeSoto Lake

- Location within Iowa Location within Nebraska Location within the United States
- Location: Iowa and Nebraska
- Coordinates: 41°29′54″N 96°00′23″W
- Type: Artificial lake
- First flooded: 1958
- Surface area: 811 acres (328 ha)
- Max. depth: 26 feet (7.9 m)
- Surface elevation: 991 feet (302 m)

DeSoto Lake is a lake within DeSoto National Wildlife Refuge, Harrison and Pottawattamie counties, Iowa and Washington County, Nebraska. The 811 acres (328 ha) lake has a maximum depth of 26 feet (7.9 m). Though it has the appearance of a natural lake it is man-made, created from a channel leading from the Missouri River in 1958.

== History ==
The lake was once merely a bend of the same name along the Missouri River. In 1865, the steamboat Bertrand sank at DeSoto Bend. It was later excavated in 1968. In 1958, the Army Corps of Engineers engineered a new 2-mile channel to bypass the 8-mile bend, creating a new lake. Despite being man-made, it has the appearance of a natural lake. The lake creation was part of the overall development of the DeSoto National Wildlife Refuge.

== Wildlife ==
The lake is home to fish species such as black crappie, bluegill, channel catfish, flathead catfish, freshwater drum, largemouth bass, paddlefish, river carpsucker, sauger, walleye, white bass and yellow bass. Sport fishing on the lake is practiced, but subject to restrictions laid out by the states of Iowa and Nebraska. Birds found on the lake include wood ducks, geese (including snow geese), herons, and plovers.
