= Paul Detlefsen =

American painter (1899–1986)

- Born: October 3, 1899; Copenhagen, Denmark
- Died: August 1, 1986 (aged 86); Encinitas, California

Paul Detlefsen (October 3, 1899 – August 1, 1986) was a Danish-born American commercial artist of the mid to late 20th century, associated with the "Hollywood scene". He is known for his realistic depictions of serene, nostalgic scenes; his works were reproduced in a popular line of calendars and other prints.

== Biography ==
Paul Detlefsen was born in Copenhagen, Denmark. He was the son of a medical doctor. He studied at the School of the Art Institute of Chicago before moving to Hollywood to build his reputation as a cartoonist.

Failing to establish himself as an animator, he produced backdrops for films. In the 1920s, he worked under Ferdinand Earle, father of animator Eyvind Earle, on a "motion painting" adaptation of Faust in which Mary Pickford was slated to star. He was nominated at the 17th Academy Awards, along with coworkers John Crouse and Nathan Levinson, for their work on the 1944 film The Adventures of Mark Twain.

Although he spent twenty years at Warner Brothers Studios, eventually rising to lead the art department that created matte backdrops, the only other films for which Detlefsen is credited are The Horn Blows at Midnight (1945), Escape in the Desert (1945), and Shadow of a Woman (1946).

Detlefsen then shifted to a career in calendar artwork. His art was lithographed into calendars, reproductions, playing cards, jigsaw puzzles, table mat, and even four-foot-wide wall murals. His first calendar, published in 1951, was "The Good Old Days", which focused on landscape art. In 1969, UPI estimated that eighty percent of all Americans had seen his work.

In 1964, Paul and his wife Shelly moved to Encinitas, California, where Paul continued painting into the last few months of his life.
