= Life on the Mississippi (film) =

Life on the Mississippi is a made-for-television feature film, based loosely on the 1883 book of the same title by Mark Twain. It was directed by Peter H. Hunt, and starred David Knell as the young Mark Twain and Robert Lansing as his teacher, Horace Bixby. Marcy Walker, who later appeared on All My Children, played a character named Emmeline. It aired in 1980 as part of the PBS series, Great Performances, and was released for home video in 1984 by MCA Entertainment. It was the first in a group of films directed by Hunt based on Twain's work.
