= Pennsylvania (steamboat) =

American steamboat (1854–1858)

Coordinates: 34.659440°N 90.480675°W

The steamboat Pennsylvania was a side wheeler steamboat which suffered a boiler explosion in the Mississippi River and sank at Ship Island near Memphis, Tennessee, on June 13, 1858.

== Construction and career ==
Built in 1854, the Pennsylvania was capable of carrying a full 486 tons of cargo. On November 26, 1857, she was struck by the steamer Vicksburg while 28 miles north of New Orleans, Louisiana. This collision put her out of service until February 17, 1858. Subsequently, she continued her service on the river until destroyed by a boiler explosion on June 13, 1858.

== Employment of Samuel L. Clemens ==
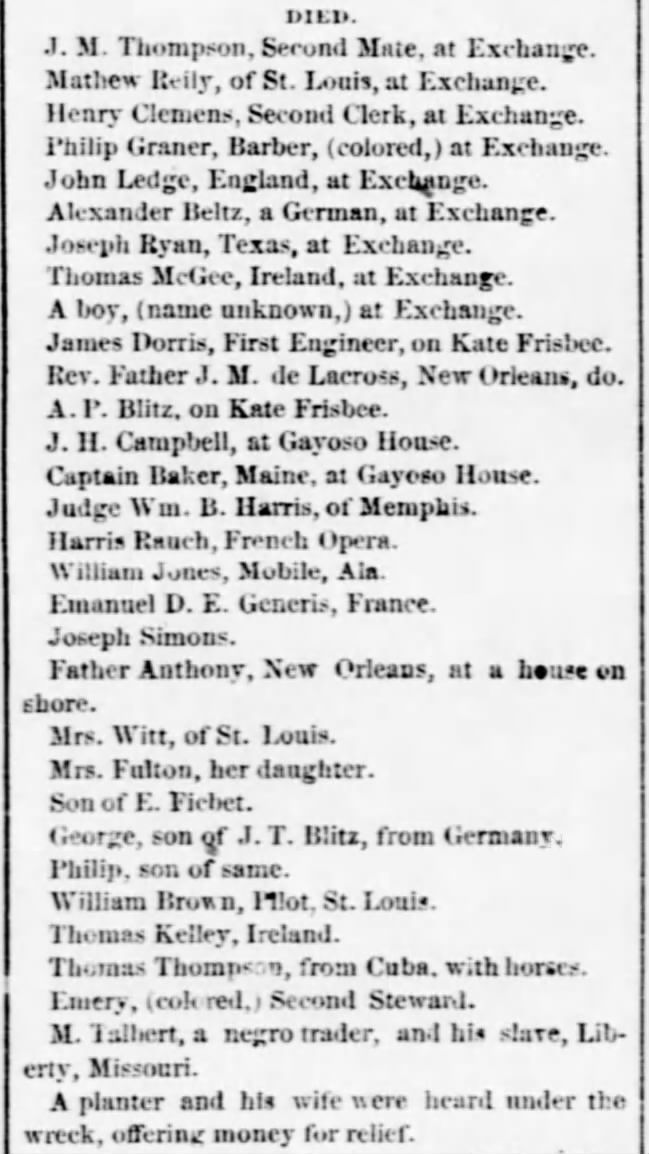
Casualty list for the Pennsylvania, including Henry Clemens, second clerk (Daily Missouri Republican, July 18, 1858)

Her most heralded crew member was Samuel L. Clemens (later known as Mark Twain) who served as a cub pilot from September 27, 1857, until June 5, 1858, with a two-month break during the repairs from the Vicksburg collision. The end of Twain's service on the Pennsylvania was brought about by his stormy relationship with its pilot, William Brown, which is described in his 1883 book Life on the Mississippi. Just prior to his departure, he arranged a post for his brother, Henry on the steamship as "Mud Clerk".

== Final voyage and sinking ==
On June 13, 1858, the Pennsylvania was steaming near Ship Island, just below Memphis, Tennessee when its boiler exploded. Estimates at the time put the passenger manifest at 450 with an initial loss of life of 250. The first vessel on site was the Imperial, which picked up several passengers and transported them to New Orleans. The Diana took many others to Memphis. Several of these were seriously injured and the death toll continued to climb. Among this group was Henry Clemens, younger brother of Mark Twain, whose skin and lungs were so badly scalded that he succumbed to his wounds on June 21. Another casualty of the explosion was Tennessee Supreme Court justice William R. Harris. Eyewitness testimony was given to the fact that the engineer was not at his post in the engine room just prior to the explosion, instead being in the company of some women. Future Ohio politician Jeremiah A. Brown was another prominent crew member who was on the boat at the time of the accident.
