= Doug Parker (disambiguation) =

Doug Parker may refer to:

- Doug Parker, chief executive officer of US Airways
- Doug Parker (voice actor), voice actor
- Douglas Parker, playwright
- Douglas H. Parker (born 1926), former law school professor
- Douglas L. Parker, American attorney and government official
- Chief Parker, fictional DC Comics character, appears in stories featuring the original Superboy
