= Life on the Mississippi =

1883 memoir by Mark Twain

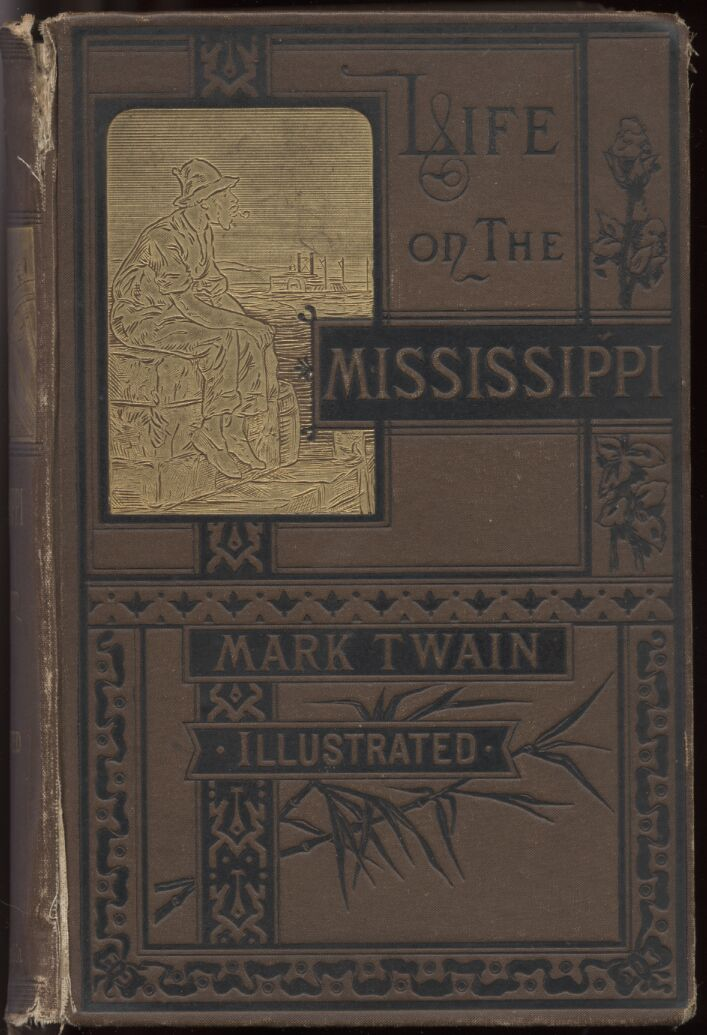
- Cover of the original U.S. edition, 1883
- Author: Mark Twain
- Language: English
- Genre: Biography
- Publisher: James R. Osgood & Co., Boston (U.S. edition); Chatto & Windus, London (English edition)
- Publication date: 1883
- Publication place: United States and England
- Media type: Print
- Pages: 624
- Preceded by: The Prince and the Pauper
- Followed by: Adventures of Huckleberry Finn

Life on the Mississippi is a memoir published in 1883 by Mark Twain of his days as a steamboat pilot on the Mississippi River in the antebellum era. It is also a travel book, recounting his trips on the Mississippi River, from St. Louis to New Orleans and then from New Orleans to Saint Paul, many years after the war.

== Overview ==
The book begins with a brief history of the river as reported by Europeans and Americans, beginning with the Spanish explorer Hernando de Soto in 1542. It continues with anecdotes of Twain's training as a steamboat pilot, as the 'cub' (apprentice) of an experienced pilot, Horace E. Bixby. He describes, with great affection, the science of navigating the ever-changing Mississippi River in a section that was first published in 1876, entitled "Old Times on the Mississippi". Although Twain was actually 21 when he began his training, he uses artistic license to make himself seem somewhat younger, referring to himself as a "fledgling" and a "boy" who "ran away from home" to seek his fortune on the river, and playing up his own callowness and naïveté. He also tells the story of witnessing his brother Henry's death in the hospital after a steamboat’s boiler explodes.

In the second half, Twain narrates his trip many years later on a steamboat from St. Louis to New Orleans, shortly followed by a steamboat journey from New Orleans to St Paul (with a stop at his boyhood home town of Hannibal, MO). He describes the competition from railroads, and the new, large cities, and adds his observations on greed, gullibility, tragedy, and bad architecture. He also tells some stories that are most likely tall tales.

== Publication ==
Simultaneously published in 1883 in the United States and Great Britain, the book was the first submitted to a publisher as a typewritten manuscript. Twain did not, however, use the typewriter himself. His secretary, Isabel V. Lyon, typed from Twain's manuscript.

== Dramatic adaptations ==
In 1980, the book was adapted as a TV movie for American public television, with David Knell performing as Samuel Clemens (Mark Twain's real name) and Robert Lansing as Horace Bixby, the steamboat pilot who mentored him. The film used many tall tales from the book, woven into a fictional narrative.

In 2010, Life on the Mississippi was adapted as a stage musical, with book and lyrics by Douglas M. Parker and music by Denver Casado. It was produced that year in Kansas City, Missouri, and Door County, Wisconsin.

In 2013, Life on the Mississippi, a musical play by Philip Hall, was performed at the Workshop Theater Company in New York. It was directed by Susanna Frazer.

== See also ==
- George Washington Cable
- Lagniappe
- Joseph Alexander Mabry, Jr.
- Mark Twain Birthplace State Historic Site
- Mark Twain Boyhood Home & Museum
- Mark Twain House
- Mud clerk
- Paddle steamer
- Pennsylvania steamboat
- Riverboat
- Steamboat
- Steamboats of the Mississippi
