= Peter H. Hunt =

American theatre director (1938–2020)

- Born: Peter Huls Hunt; December 19, 1938; Pasadena, California, U.S.
- Died: April 26, 2020 (aged 81); Los Angeles, California, U.S.
- Occupations: Director, lighting designer
- Years active: 1958–2003
- Spouse: Barbette Tweed
- Children: 3
- Relatives: Gordon Hunt (paternal half-brother); Helen Hunt (niece)

Peter Huls Hunt (December 19, 1938 – April 26, 2020) was an American theatre, film and television director and theatrical lighting designer.

== Life and career ==
Hunt was born in Pasadena, California, the son of Gertrude (née Orphüls) and George Smith Hunt II, a Minnesota-born industrial designer. He attended Hotchkiss School and then Yale University, where he received a BA in 1961 and an MFA from the Yale School of Drama in 1963.

Hunt began his professional career as a lighting designer at the Williamstown Theatre Festival in 1958. He became artistic director in 1989, a post he held until 1995. He had an active career on Broadway as well, first as a lighting designer and then director. In 1969, he helmed the Broadway musical 1776, winning the Tony Award for Best Direction of a Musical for his efforts. His next project, Georgy, was less successful, closing after only four performances. He received a second Tony nomination for Goodtime Charley in 1975. His last Broadway project was The Scarlet Pimpernel in 1997. He directed several benefit shows for the Actors Fund in Los Angeles, including staged readings of Sunset Boulevard and Casablanca.

Hunt's feature film credits include the screen adaptation of 1776 and Give 'em Hell, Harry! He directed numerous television movies, including four based on the Hart to Hart series and Dead Man's Island starring Barbara Eden. He also directed episodes of Baywatch, Baywatch Nights, and Touched by an Angel, among others. He was producer-director of four of the feature adaptations in the Peabody Award-winning Mark Twain Series on PBS including Life on the Mississippi and Adventures of Huckleberry Finn.

Hunt was the uncle of actress Helen Hunt, through his half-brother, director Gordon Hunt. He resided in Los Angeles, California. He was married to former actress Barbette Tweed, daughter of lawyer/civic leader Harrison Tweed. The couple had three children.

Hunt died on April 26, 2020, from complications of Parkinson's disease at the age of 81.

== Filmography ==
- 1776 (1972)
- The Karen Valentine Show (1973 TV special short)
- Hello Mother, Goodbye! (1974 TV movie)
- Give 'em Hell, Harry! (1975, stage production)
- Mixed Nuts (1977 TV short)
- Bully: An Adventure with Teddy Roosevelt (1978)
- When She Was Bad... (1979 TV movie)
- Life on the Mississippi (1980 TV movie)
- The Private History of a Campaign That Failed (1981 TV movie)
- Nuts and Bolts (1981 TV movie)
- Bus Stop (1982 TV movie)
- The Mysterious Stranger (1982 TV movie)
- Skeezer (1982 TV movie)
- Sawyer and Finn (1983 TV movie)
- The Parade (1984 TV movie)
- Sins of the Past (1984 TV movie)
- It Came Upon the Midnight Clear (1984 TV movie)
- Adventures of Huckleberry Finn (1986 TV mini-series)
- Charley Hannah (1986 TV movie)
- Mr. and Mrs. Ryan (1986 TV movie)
- The Innocents Abroad (1987 TV movie)
- Secrets (1992 TV movie)
- The Streets of Beverly Hills (1992 TV movie)
- Sworn to Vengeance (1993 TV movie)
