= The Adventures of Mark Twain (1944 film) =

1944 film by Irving Rapper

- Original film poster
- Directed by: Irving Rapper
- Written by: Alan Le May; Harold M. Sherman
- Produced by: Jesse L. Lasky
- Starring: Fredric March; Alexis Smith
- Cinematography: Sol Polito
- Edited by: Ralph Dawson
- Music by: Max Steiner
- Production company: Warner Bros. Pictures
- Distributed by: Warner Bros. Pictures
- Release date: May 6, 1944
- Running time: 130 minutes
- Country: United States
- Language: English
- Budget: $1,623,000
- Box office: $2,350,000

The Adventures of Mark Twain is a 1944 American biographical film directed by Irving Rapper and starring Fredric March as Samuel Clemens (Mark Twain) and Alexis Smith as Twain's wife Olivia. Produced by Warner Bros. Pictures, the film was nominated for three Academy Awards, including that for Best Music for Max Steiner's score. Irving Rapper was hesitant to direct the film but was persuaded by Hal B. Wallis.

== Plot ==
A group of people are watching Halley's Comet overhead when Judge Clemens is called away for the birth of his son Samuel. The film proceeds to depict elements of many of Clemens' best-known stories as if they actually occurred. Thus, as he grows up, Sam plays with his friends Huck, Tom, and the slave boy Jim on a raft on the Mississippi River, providing a fictitious "real-life" basis for the novels Tom Sawyer and The Adventures of Huckleberry Finn.

The teenage Sam goes to work for his brother Orion, publisher of the Hannibal Journal newspaper, but after three unhappy years, runs away to become a riverboat pilot. After a rough start, he thrives under the tutelage of Captain Horace Bixby and becomes a highly skilled pilot on the Mississippi.

One day, he spots a pickpocket robbing Charles Langdon, a passenger aboard his ship. Among the possessions Sam forces the thief to return is a small portrait of Charles's sister Olivia. After seeing it, Sam falls deeply in love. As they become friends, Sam tells Charles that he is going to marry Olivia. To that end, he gives up his job to seek his fortune with his friend Steve, prospecting (with little success) in the west.

When he finally gives up, he becomes a newspaper reporter in Nevada. Steve persuades him to enter a jumping frog contest (taken from Twain's first major story, "The Celebrated Jumping Frog of Calaveras County") against Bret Harte. Steve cheats by secretly feeding lead buckshot to Harte's champion frog. Their frog wins easily, but Sam sheepishly admits to Steve that he bet their money on the champ. Sam then writes the story and, under the pen name Mark Twain, tries to get it published.

When the Civil War begins, Sam leaves Nevada, narrowly missing J. B. Pond, who has come from the East to find the writer of the frog story. (In real life, Clemens went to Nevada after the war started, partly to get away from the conflict.) The "Jumping Frog of Calaveras County" is published in newspapers and is widely enjoyed as a welcome change from the grim war news. (In real life, the frog story was not published until the war was already over.)

When the Civil War ends, Pond finally finds Sam. He signs him up for a lecture tour. Charles and Olivia ("Livy") Langdon are in the audience of his very first lecture, where his humor and wit make him an immediate success. He marries Livy, despite her father's initial opposition, and becomes a famous writer and lecturer.

However, Sam wants to become more than just a humorist. He invests in a typesetting machine and establishes a publishing company. Both ventures require more and more capital, so Sam has to keep writing furiously for years. Finally, he turns to businessman Henry Huttleston Rogers to extricate him from his financial mess. Rogers tells him he can avoid bankruptcy, but only if he does not honor his overly generous contract to publish Ulysses S. Grant's memoirs. Dismayed to find Grant poverty-stricken and dying, Sam decides that the country owes the man so much that going bankrupt is a small price to pay. (In reality, the company did publish Grant's memoirs—about eight years before Clemens met Rogers—and the venture was a huge success. The business did, in fact, eventually go bankrupt, but not because of Grant.) Though Rogers persuades the creditors to accept half payment, Sam is determined to pay in full his staggering debt of $250,000. To do so, he embarks on a strenuous worldwide lecture tour, leaving behind Livy to care for their daughters.

At last, he manages to pay everything off and is reunited with his now-ailing wife in Florence. She is very proud when she receives word just before she dies that her husband is to receive an honorary doctorate from Oxford University, which she considers the greatest honor a writer can attain.

Sam himself dies when Halley's Comet returns in 1910 (as he had predicted). Afterward, his spirit is called away by Tom and Huck to join them in the afterlife. Before walking away, Sam tells his grieving daughter (who cannot see him) that the rumors of his demise are greatly exaggerated.

== Cast ==
- Fredric March as Mark Twain
- Alexis Smith as Olivia "Livy" Langdon Clemens
- Donald Crisp as J.B. Pond
- Alan Hale as Steve Gillis
- C. Aubrey Smith as Oxford Chancellor
- John Carradine as Bret Harte
- William Henry as Charles Langdon
- Robert Barrat as Horace E. Bixby
- Walter Hampden as Jervis Langdon
- Joyce Reynolds as Clara Clemens
- Whitford Kane as Joe Goodwin
- Percy Kilbride as Billings
- Nana Bryant as Mrs. Langdon
- Joseph Crehan as Riverboat Captain/Ulysses S. Grant (uncredited)
- Russell Gleason as Orion Clemens (uncredited)
- Harry Hilliard as John Greenleaf Whittier (uncredited)
- Brandon Hurst as Ralph Waldo Emerson (uncredited)
- George Lessey as Henry Huttleston Rogers (uncredited)
- Paul Scardon as Rudyard Kipling (uncredited)
- Douglas Wood as William Dean Howells (uncredited)

== Reception ==
Contemporary assessments were mixed. Bosley Crowther gave a generally negative review in The New York Times, calling it a "lengthy and desultory picture" and "a spotty and often inaccurate chronicle", and complaining "This spotty character of the picture is due not alone to the script but also to the direction, which is strangely inconsistent throughout." He continued by saying "Mr. March's performance of Twain is agreeable," but called Alexis Smith's portrayal "colorless and conventional". David Lardner of The New Yorker dismissed the film, writing that it wasn't much worse than most biographical films and "does have its good moments", but "once more biographical inaccuracy is rampant, and once more the best dramatic possibilities have been overlooked."

Variety ran a positive review, calling it "an educational yet highly entertaining biography of the immortal American ... The stars, notably, perform their assignments with extraordinary compassion and understanding, particularly March in the title role." Harrison's Reports was also positive, calling it "an excellently produced, heart-warming human-interest drama, well acted and directed. Fredric March portrays Twain with deep understanding."

Another positive review was given by Sara Hamilton of Photoplay, who described the film as "a well told tale of a great American", and wrote, "There are times when the story is slow, but on the whole it's as pleasant an experience as reading a warm, friendly volume by Twain himself." Hamilton described Fredric March’s performance as "wonderful" and "finely etched", and concluded her review with the comment, "A word of praise goes to make-up man Perc Westmore, to Alexis Smith for a truly beautiful performance, to Donald Crisp, Alan Hale and Robert Barrat for interesting performances."

The Adventures of Mark Twain has been called "perhaps the most impressive of all Forties large-scale biopics" by Charles Higham and Joel Greenberg in their book Hollywood in the Forties.

The following were nominated for the 17th Academy Awards:

- John Hughes and Fred M. MacLean for Best Art Direction-Interior Decoration, Black-and-White
- Paul Detlefsen and John Crouse (photographic) and Nathan Levinson (sound) for Best Effects, Special Effects
- Max Steiner for Best Music, Scoring of a Dramatic or Comedy Picture

=== Box office ===
According to Warner Bros. records, the film earned $1,736,000 in the U.S. and $614,000 in other markets.

== See also ==
- Mark Twain in popular culture
- List of American films of 1944
- List of biopics
- Mysterioso Pizzicato
