= John Crouse =

American special effects artist

- Born: Merwin John Seward Crouse; March 8, 1907; Storm Lake, Iowa, United States
- Died: March 17, 1982 (aged 75); San Bernardino, California, United States
- Occupation: Special effects artist
- Years active: 1944–1948
- Spouse: Leona Grace McGregor
- Children: 2

Merwin John Seward Crouse, better known as John Crouse, (March 8, 1907 – March 17, 1982) was an American special effects artist and cameraman. He was nominated for the Academy Award for Best Visual Effects for work on the film The Adventures of Mark Twain (1944). After leaving the film industry he became a chicken farmer.

== Life and career ==
Merwin John Seward Crouse was born on March 8, 1907 in Storm Lake, Iowa. He was the son of Harry J. Crouse and his wife Ollie Crouse (née Thayer). They divorced in 1922. At that time his father was employed as a banker and secretary of the Farmers Loan & Trust Company in Sioux City, Iowa. After the divorce he lived with his mother at 2755 Court St. in Sioux City. He was educated in Sioux City at Bryant School and Sioux City Central High School and Central Annex (graduated 1926). While a teenager he played saxophone in the Criterions, a jazz band that played in local theaters and on local radio.

By 1931 Crouse was living in Hollywood, California and was employed as a film cameraman. That year he married Leona McGregor from his growing up years in Sioux City. Their first child, a daughter Janice, was born in Burbank, California in 1933. This was followed by a son, Jimmy. By 1944 he was under contract with Warner Bros. as a cameraman, and that year was a cinematographer for film made in aid of the American Red Cross. He was nominated for an Academy Award for Best Special Effects at the 17th Academy Awards for work on the film The Adventures of Mark Twain (1944). He also did special effects for the film Adventures of Don Juan (1948).

By 1949 Crouse and his wife were operating their own photography studio, Marjon Photo Center, in partnership with Martin and Dorothy Glovner in Sherman Oaks, Los Angeles. The Crouse family relocated to Sebastopol, California. There they established a chicken farm in 1951.

Crouse died on March 17, 1982 in San Bernardino, California.
