= Boyer Chute National Wildlife Refuge =

Wildlife refuge in Nebraska, U.S.

Boyer Chute
- IUCN category IV (habitat/species management area)
- Location within Nebraska Location within the United States
- Location: Washington County, Nebraska, United States
- Nearest city: Omaha, NE
- Coordinates: 41°28′02″N 096°00′04″W
- Area: 4,040 acres (16.3 km^{2})
- Established: 1992
- Governing body: U.S. Fish and Wildlife Service
- Website: www.fws.gov/refuge/boyer_chute

Boyer Chute National Wildlife Refuge, created in 1992, is a National Wildlife Refuge (NWR) located along the banks of the Missouri River in the U.S. state of Nebraska. The 4,040-acre (1,630 ha) refuge preserves an area that had been cultivated and neglected before the early 1990s. Channelization projects along the Missouri River to improve flood control and navigation resulted in the closing off a side branch of the river, known since the early 19th century as Boyer Chute. Between 1820 and 1937 the Missouri River had migrated 3 mi (4.8 km) eastward and the area of the chute had originally been on the east bank of the river; today, the chute is west of the main channel of the Missouri. In 1937, the Army Corps of Engineers began to rechannel portions of the Missouri River, cutting off the chute to flowing water. Overgrowth and cultivation took over the lands now preserved in the refuge. Restoration of the area commenced in 1993; this included planting 9,100 native plants and trees and restoring the inflow to the chute from the main channel of the Missouri River.

Today, the refuge is home to dozens of mammal species, including white-tailed deer, beavers, opossum, raccoon, bobcat, fox and coyote. Bald eagle, heron, duck, belted kingfisher and hawks are known to inhabit the refuge. Restoration projects also improved sport fishing opportunities by providing better breeding habitat. The refuge is along one of the primary bird migration routes in North America; the population of migratory birds increases substantially during spring and fall months.

Several miles of nature trails provide access through portions of the refuge and a concrete pedestrian bridge crosses over the chute to an island. During low water flow levels along the Missouri River in the late fall and winter months, the chute may have little or no water in it. Hunting is allowed in season with a permit and there are several fishing piers. Dogs are allowed, but must be on a leash no longer than 6 feet.

The refuge sustained extensive damage during the 2011 Missouri River floods. As of spring 2012, the refuge roads remained closed and no date had been determined for when they would be reopened. 300,000 dollars has been requested to remove six flood damaged structures in an effort to get the refuge reopened. Planners indicated that structures may not be rebuilt since there is no method to protect them from future flooding events.

Boyer NWR is located 15 mi (24 km) north of Omaha, Nebraska; most visitors follow U.S. Highway 75 to Fort Calhoun, Nebraska, and then follow the signs east for 3 miles (4.8 km) to the refuge. Built in the 1820s, Fort Atkinson, the first U.S. Army post west of the Missouri River, is 2.5 mi (4.0 km) west of the refuge.

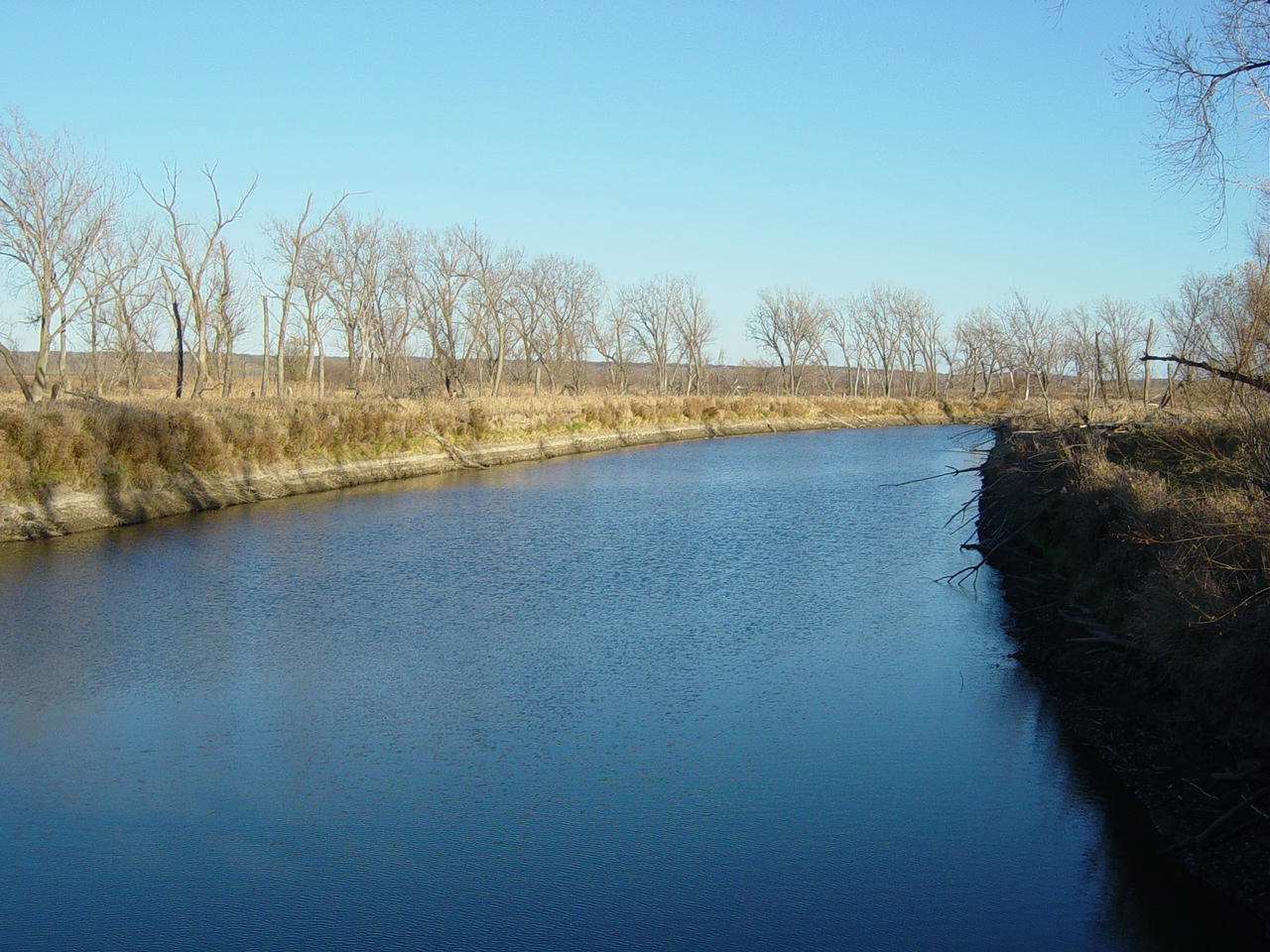
Boyer Chute NWR in November 2005

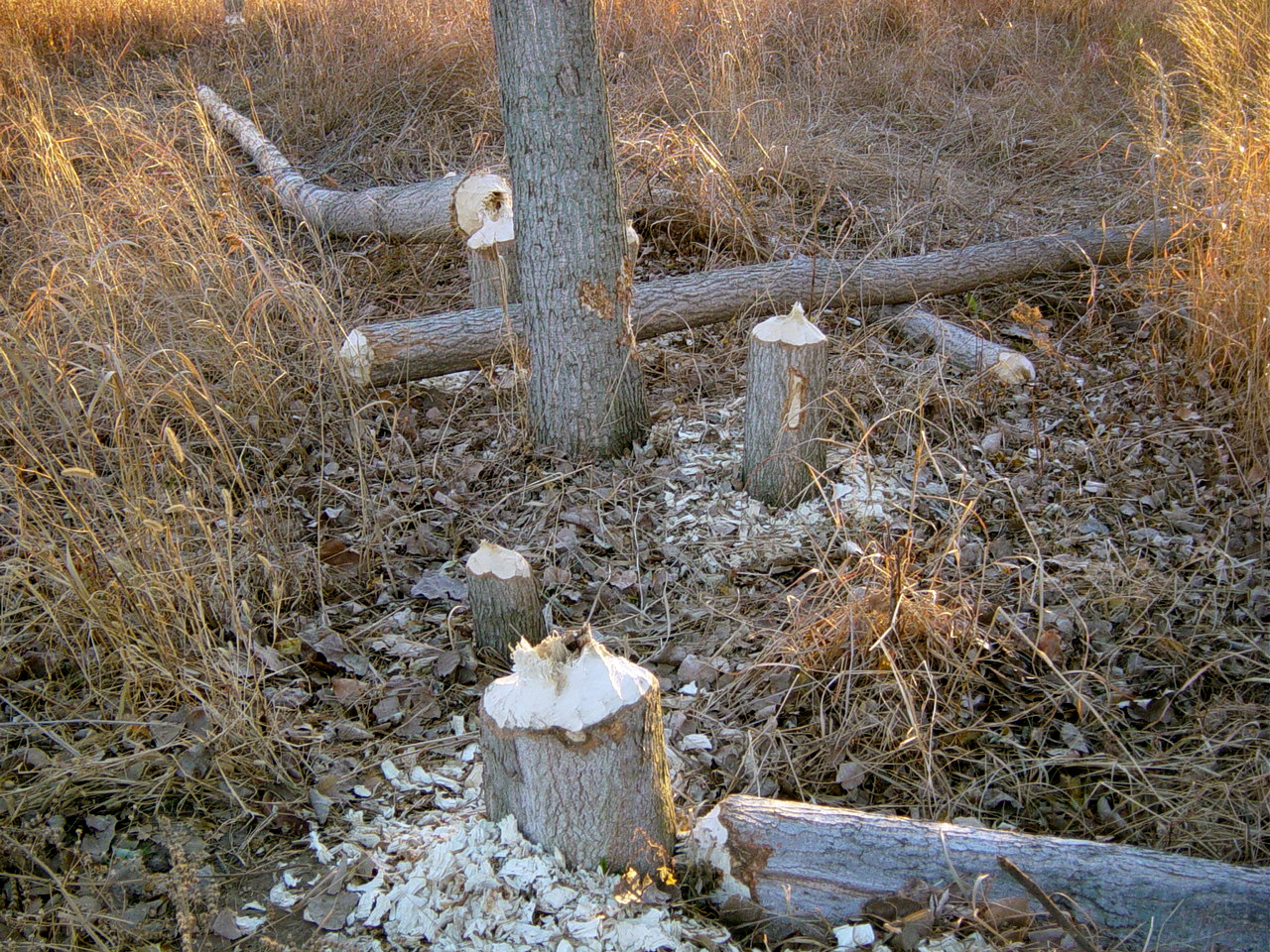
Beaver activity in Boyer Chute NWR

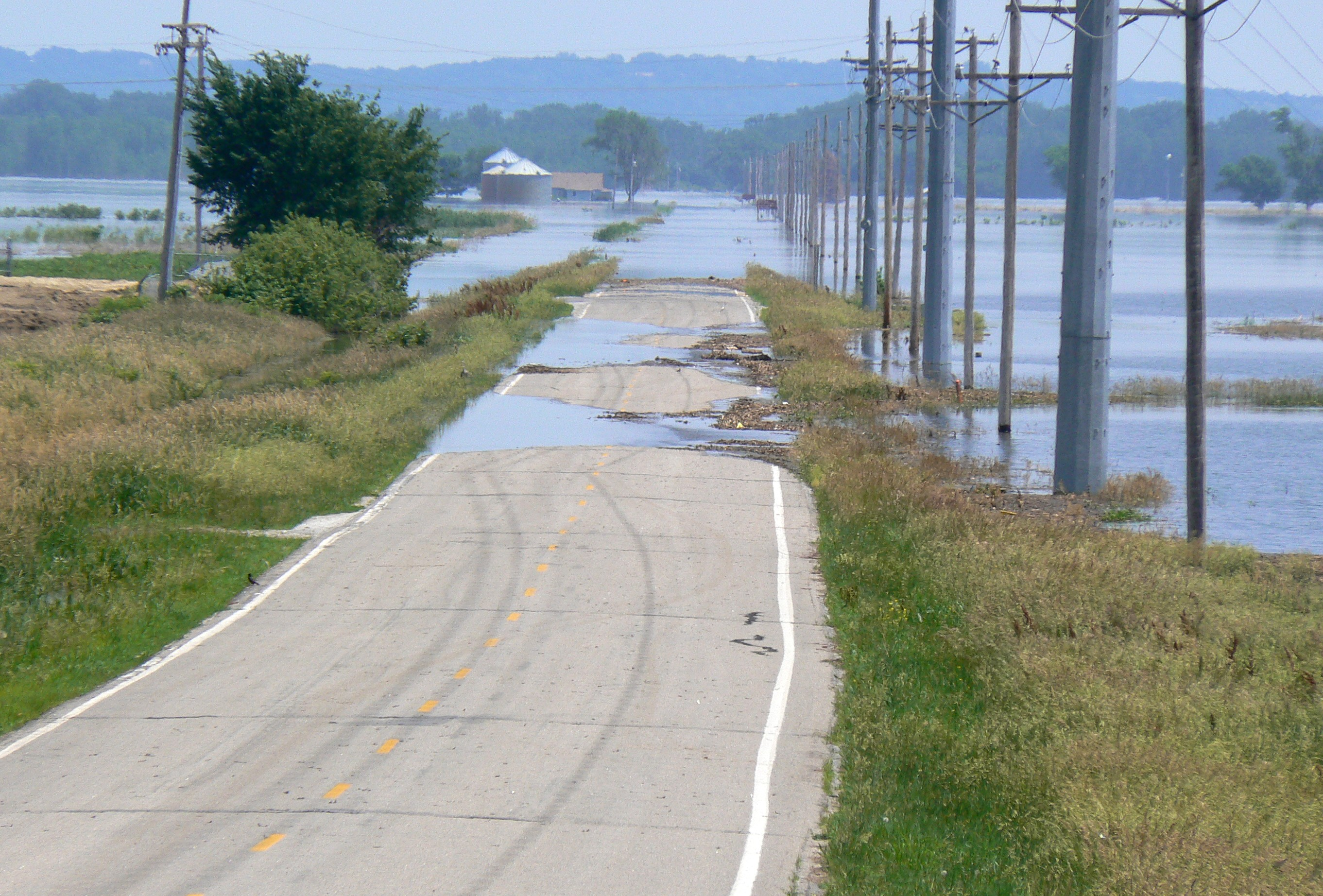
Road leading to Boyer Chute underwater in June 2011

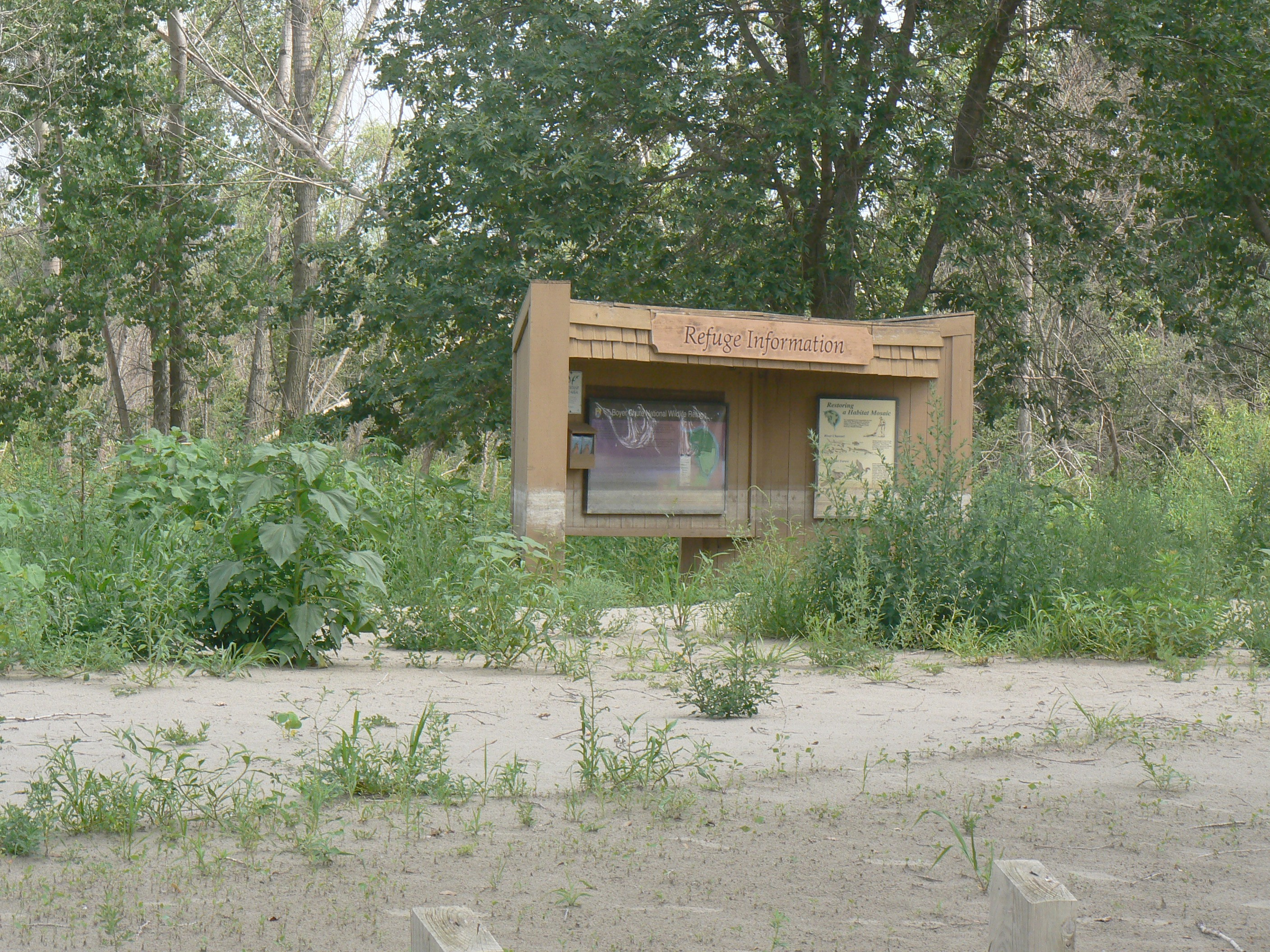
Waterline and silt left behind by Missouri River floods of 2011 as seen a year later

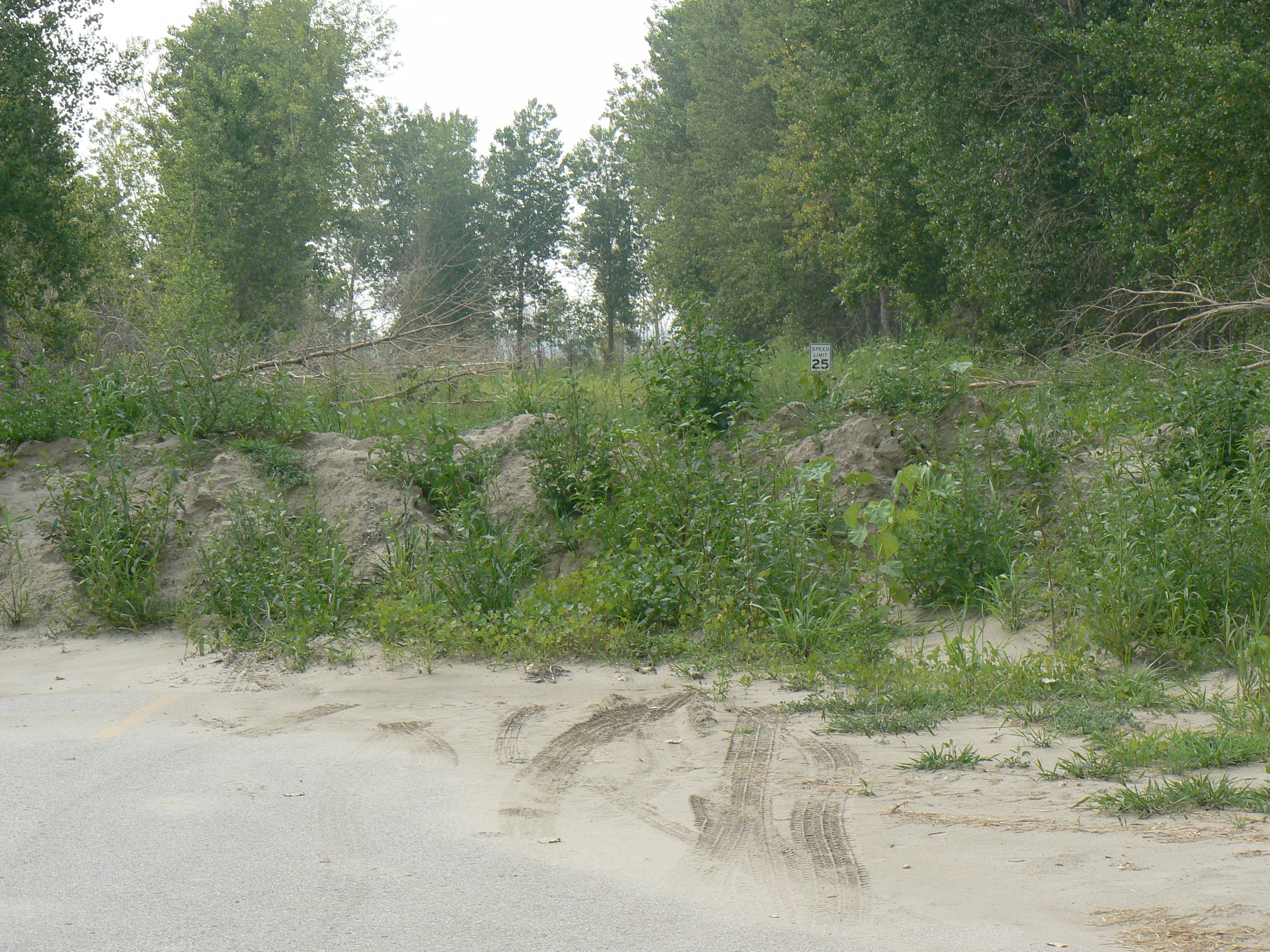
Road blocked by debris from 2011 Missouri River floods

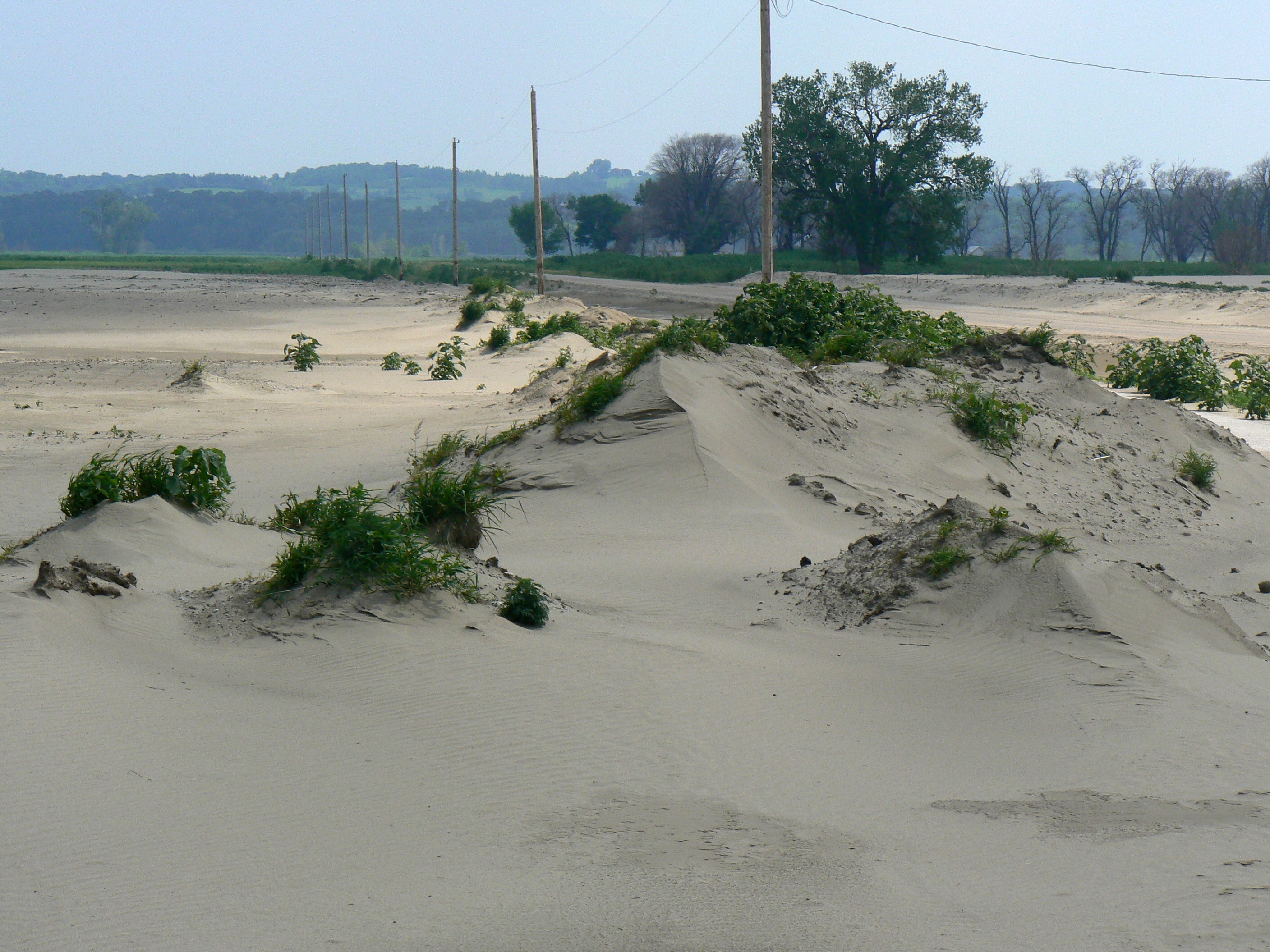
Silt and sand dunes from 2011 Missouri River floods

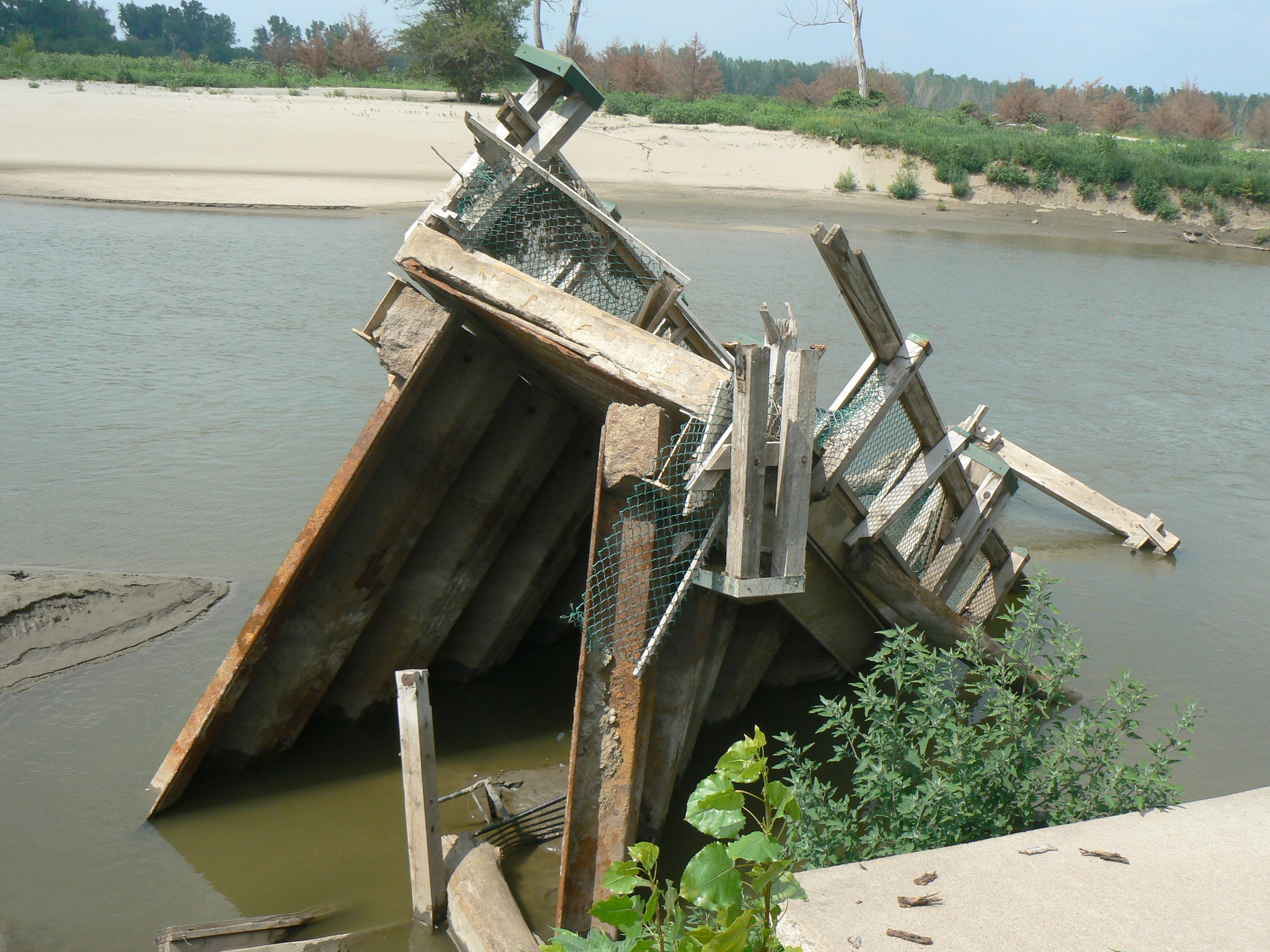
Fishing pier destroyed by 2011 Missouri River floods

== See also ==
- DeSoto National Wildlife Refuge
- Fort Atkinson State Historic Park
