= Bertrand (steamboat) =

- Bertrand Site
- U.S. National Register of Historic Places
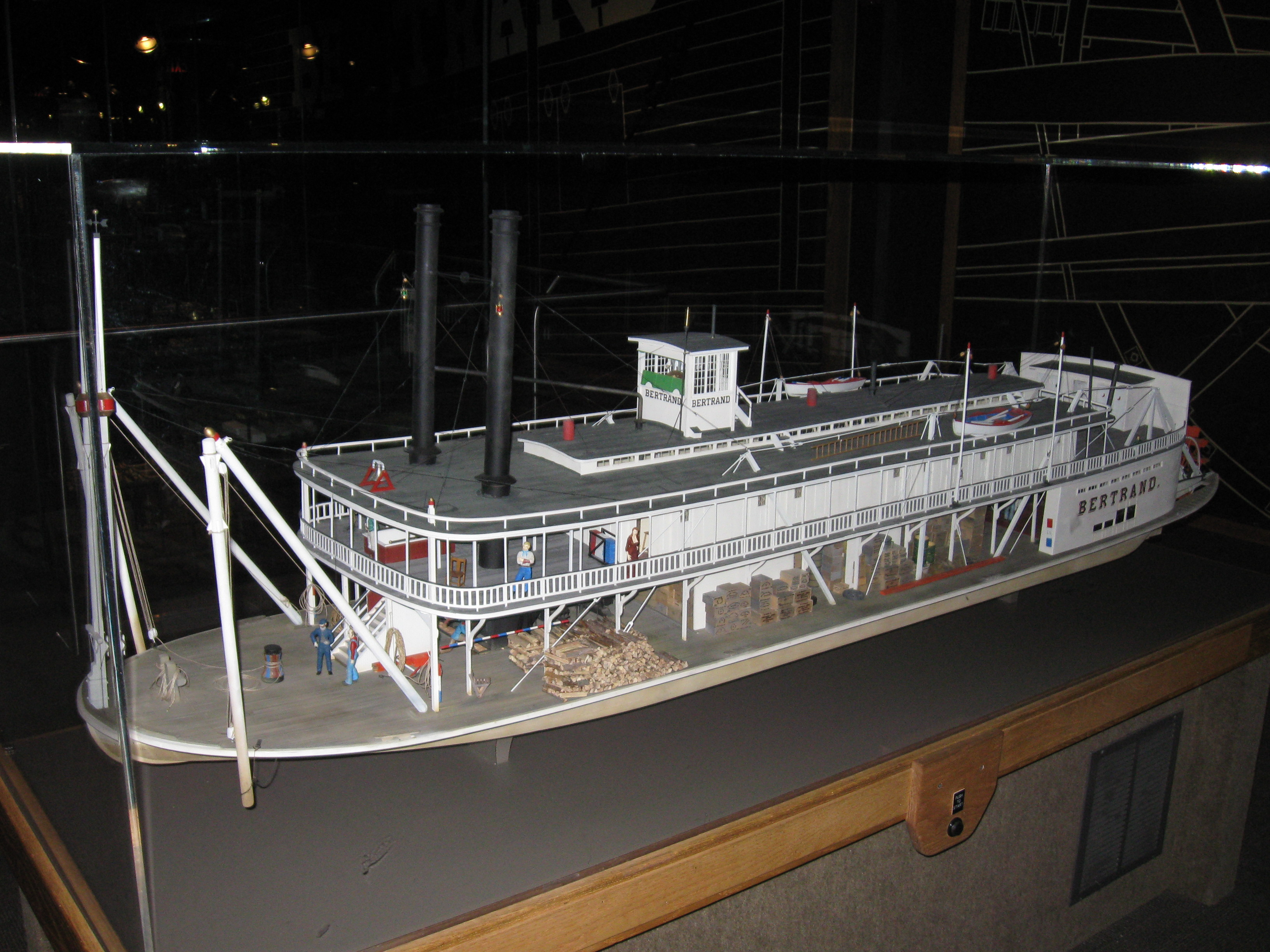
- Model of the Bertrand

- Location within Nebraska Location within the United States
- Nearest city: Blair, Nebraska
- Coordinates: 41°31′24″N 96°1′44″W
- Built: 1864
- NRHP reference No.: 69000138
- Added to NRHP: March 24, 1969

The Bertrand was a steamboat which sank on April 1, 1865, while carrying cargo up the Missouri River to Virginia City, Montana Territory, after hitting a snag in the river north of Omaha, Nebraska. Half of its cargo was recovered during an excavation in 1968, more than 100 years later. Today, the artifacts are displayed in a museum at the DeSoto National Wildlife Refuge near Missouri Valley, Iowa. The display makes up the largest intact collection of Civil War-era artifacts in the United States and is an invaluable time capsule of everyday life during that period.

== History ==
=== Launch and voyages ===
The Bertrand was launched in Wheeling, West Virginia in 1864. It measured 161 feet (49 m) long, with a beam of 32 feet (9.8 m); its total burden was reported as 251 tons. A shallow-draft vessel, it drew only 18 inches (46 cm) when light, and perhaps no more than twice that when loaded. Sources differ regarding the ownership of the Bertrand, but it probably belonged to the Montana and Idaho Transportation Line, which was based in St. Louis, Missouri. The firm was owned in part by John J. Roe of St. Louis.

The Bertrand was part of an extensive water-based regional trading system that developed during the mid to late 19th century. Only since 1859 had steamboats been traveling up the Missouri River to Fort Benton, Montana Territory. When gold was found at the Alder Gulch claim in Montana in 1863, streams of hopeful prospectors migrated to the area from other states, creating one of the most prosperous frontier cities, Virginia City. Within a year of the find, more than 35,000 people were living within a 10-mile radius of the discovery site.

J.J. Roe and his partners entered the shipping business in 1864, creating a line to ship goods up the Missouri River to the frontier of the Montana Territory. J.J. Roe & Co. also invested in the Diamond R Transportation Co., which established a system of ox trains to bring goods to more remote locations some hundreds of miles from the river. Prospectors and settlers created the demand for the goods that the steamboats were able to bring up the Missouri. By 1867, there were 113 different businesses registered in Virginia City to provide goods and services. Soon, the Alder Gulch Gold Camp grew into one of the largest frontier gold mining towns. It would prove one of the largest gold payoffs from the Rocky Mountains. The Missouri River was a major transportation route that sustained these Montana gold mines and the budding cities.

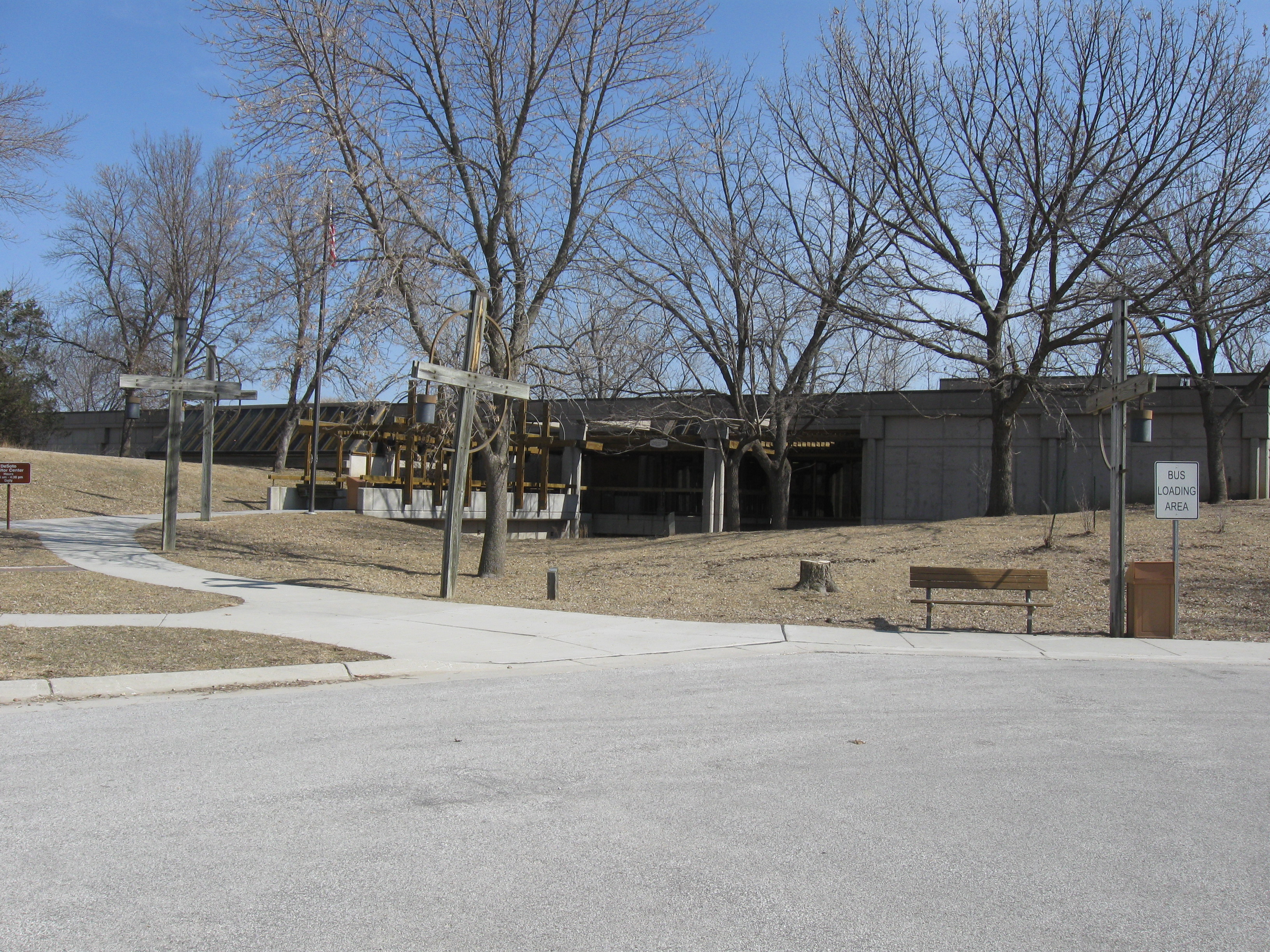
Museum at the DeSoto National Wildlife Refuge

River routes were also integral to the fur trade between St. Louis and the Indian country that provided the furs, which had been going on since the early 19th century. J.J. Roe & Co. consistently took goods upriver and brought furs and other extractive materials back down the river. On one trip in 1865, the ship unloaded in St. Louis with 260 packs of furs.

The trip from St. Louis to the new Montana Territory took about two months and was often dangerous, due to the remoteness of the region and the possibility of encounters with hostile Indian tribes, but the profits were well worth the hardships. J.J. Roe entered the market with other merchants, businessmen, and salesmen in this period, all earning their profits from supplying the demands of the settlers for consumable goods. This was an incredibly profitable economic niche on the frontier.

=== Sinking ===
On April 1, 1865, under the command of Captain James Yore, the steamboat Bertrand struck a submerged log in the Desoto Bend of the Missouri River, about 25 miles (40 km) upstream of Omaha, Nebraska. In less than ten minutes, it sank in 12 feet (3.7 m) of water. No people died, but almost the entire cargo was lost; the estimated combined value of the vessel and cargo was $100,000.

=== Rediscovery ===
More than 100 years later, in 1968, private salvagers Sam Corbino and Jesse Pursell discovered the wreck in the DeSoto National Wildlife Refuge, managed by the U.S. Department of the Interior. Since the boat was found on government property, the men had to comply with the Antiquities Act of 1906, by which they relinquished all of the recovered artifacts to the U.S. Fish and Wildlife Service for permanent preservation. More than 10,000 cubic feet of cargo and over 500,000 artifacts were recovered from the hold during the excavation. The artifacts represent a time capsule of life in 1865 and are now on display at the museum of the DeSoto National Wildlife Refuge near Missouri Valley, Iowa.

== Excavated artifacts ==
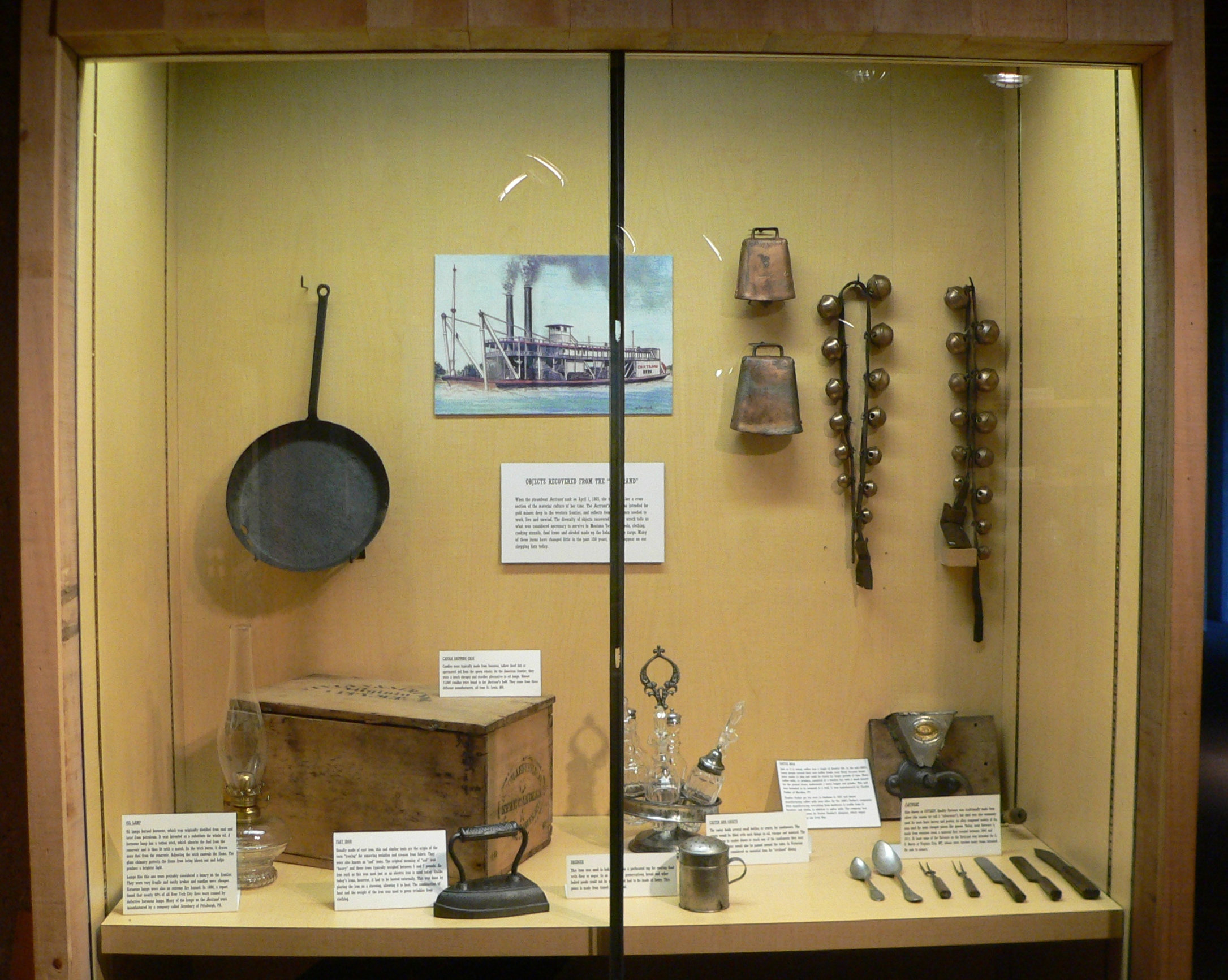
Display of artifacts recovered from the Bertrand

The cargo found on the excavated Bertrand provides a unique glimpse into the material life of Virginia City, Montana Territory. The steamboat was full of clothing, tools, food, and various consumer items on their way upriver. The ship's cargo amounted to roughly 283 cubic meters. The collection includes dried and salted beef, mutton, and pork; oysters; pepper sauce; strawberries, peaches, and peanuts; mustard from France; many bottles of whiskey including bourbon; brandy and brandied cherries; and medicine bottles. There were over 3,000 textiles and clothing items, including gloves, hats, trousers, and 137 men's coats in seven different styles. Household goods included mirrors, clocks, and silverware. There were also various building supplies for the growing town. The largest consignment of the goods was bound for the Vivian and Simpson retailer in Virginia City. They would have also been sold from log cabin stores in the surrounding towns, including that of Frank Worden, the founder of Missoula.

Many of the goods were beyond the expectations of a primitive mining town. The ship also carried everything necessary to mine the Montana claims, including blasting powder, pickaxes, and shovels. All the goods were fully insured, and the insurance company ultimately reimbursed the merchants for their losses. Far from being isolated from the rest of the country and its consumption and fashion habits, men and women on the frontier appear to have been relatively integrated and informed. The artifacts from the Bertrand represent evidence of what kinds of goods flowed from St. Louis to the Montana Territory during this important period of American state formation. More generally, water travel and the development of the steamboat played a major role in the settlement and development of America.

In 1974, samples of canned food from the wreck, including brandied peaches, oysters, plum tomatoes, honey, and mixed vegetables, were tested by the National Food Processors Association. Although their appearance, smell, and vitamin content had deteriorated, there was no trace of microbial growth and the food was determined to be still safe to eat.
