= Douglas Parker =

American dramatist

Douglas M. Parker (born May 25 1963) is a playwright known for biographical and reality-based plays. His works include BESSIE: The Life and Music of Bessie Smith (2005); Life on the Mississippi (2006); Declarations (2007); Life on the Mississippi, a musical based on his play (2008); Thicker Than Water (2009); and "The Private History of a Campaign That Failed" (2011).

Working as a librettist and lyricist, Parker adapted his play Life on the Mississippi into a musical with composer Denver Casado. In October 2008, Life on the Mississippi was named by the National Alliance for Musical Theater as one of their Five Shows You Should Know. In January 2009, Goodspeed Opera House presented the musical as one of three shows in their Festival of New Artists. In January 2010, a shorter version of Life on the Mississippi for younger audiences premiered at the Coterie Theater in Kansas City. In June 2010, the full-length version premiered with a ten-week run at American Folklore Theater in Wisconsin.

In July 2012, Parker's play Thicker Than Water won second prize at Barter Theater's Appalachian Festival of Plays and Playwrights. In September 2013, Thicker Than Water received a full production, with a scheduled run of six weeks. In October 2013, Thicker Than Water was selected as an official entrant for the 2014 Pulitzer Prize in Drama but did not win.

In August 2014, Parker's first book, Contemporary Monologues for Young Actors, was published. His second book, Fantasy Monologues for Young Actors, was published in September 2015 and his third book, Contemporary Scenes for Young Actors, was published in August 2016.

== Accolades ==
Parker's works have been produced in theaters across the country and have received multiple NEA production grants. He is a graduate of Brown University, an alumnus of the BMI Lehman Engel Musical Theater Workshop, and a member of ASCAP and the Dramatists Guild of America.
