= Mud clerk =

Worker aboard a steamboat

A mud clerk was a helper or all-around worker aboard a steamboat during the period before and after the American Civil War, on rivers west of the Appalachian mountains, particularly aboard steamboats on the Mississippi River.

According to Mark Twain in his autobiography, "Mud clerks received no salary, but they were in the line of promotion. They could become, presently, third clerk and second clerk, then chief clerk -- that is to say, purser". If the mud clerk left before they completed their apprenticeship, and thus did not become a first clerk or purser, they could use their transferable skills to be a hotel clerk or similar position.

Mud clerks were always male, and typically in their early teens or younger.

Duties included such things as running errands for the officers of the steamboat, carrying messages around the ship, keeping watch, loading and offloading freight in poor weather, and fetching food or beverages. As the name itself implies, mud clerks would often be given the dirtiest jobs aboard ship .

== See also ==
- Life on the Mississippi
- Staging (cooking)
