= DeSoto National Wildlife Refuge =

Wildlife refuge in Iowa and Nebraska, U.S.

Desoto National Wildlife Refuge
- IUCN category IV (habitat/species management area)
- Location within Iowa Location within Nebraska Location within the United States
- Location: Harrison and Pottawattamie counties, Iowa and Washington County, Nebraska, United States
- Nearest city: Blair, NE
- Coordinates: 41°31′25.2″N 96°1′4.6″W
- Area: 8,362 acres (3,384 ha)
- Established: March 12, 1958
- Governing body: U.S. Fish and Wildlife Service
- Website: DeSoto National Wildlife Refuge

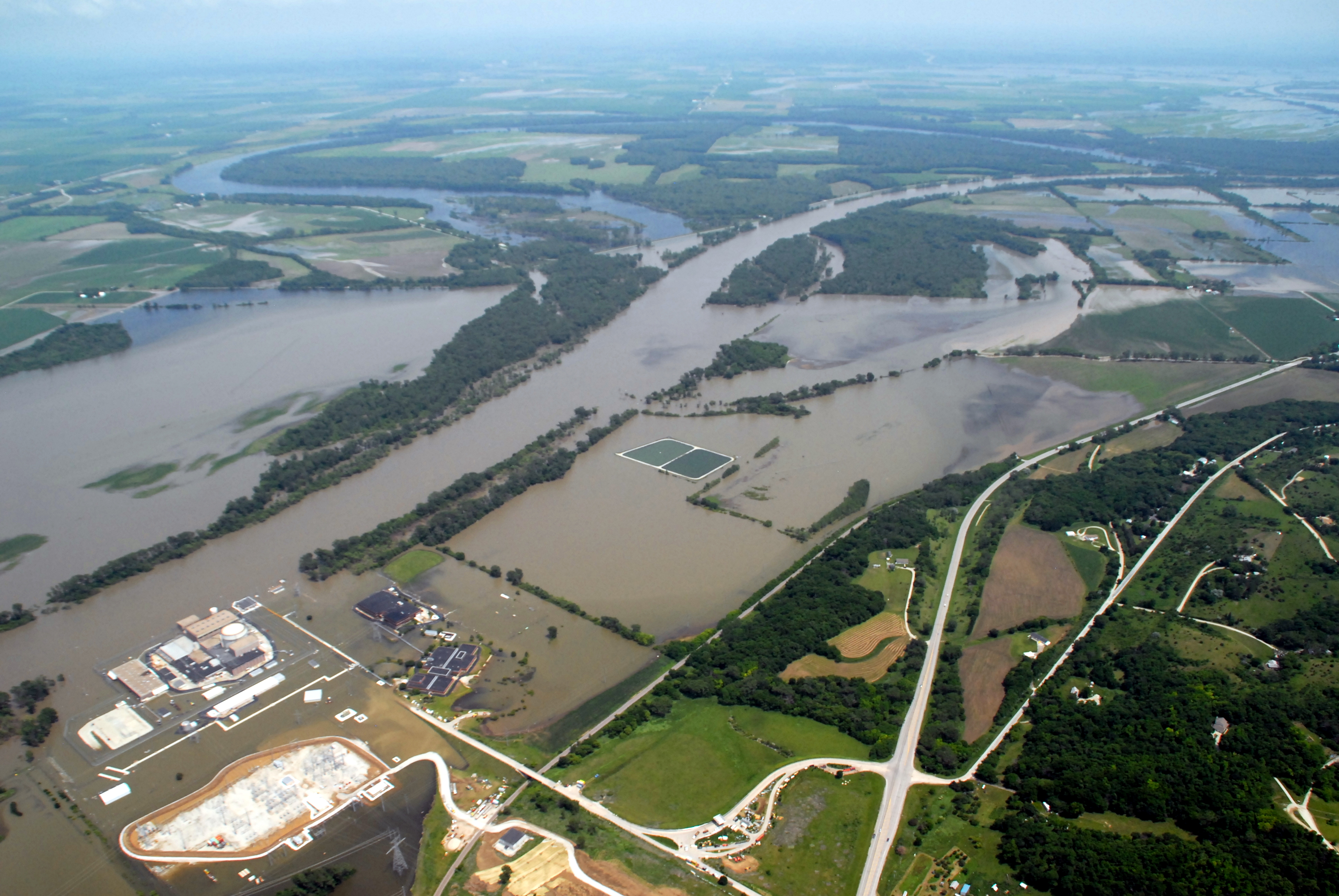
The refuge on June 20, 2011, during the 2011 Missouri River flood. The oxbow lake is in the upper left. Five days later, a levee breach resulted in the refuge closing after being nearly totally inundated. The Fort Calhoun Nuclear Generating Station is in the foreground.

DeSoto National Wildlife Refuge, created in 1958, is located along the banks of the Missouri River in the U.S. states of Iowa and Nebraska. The 8,362-acre (3,384 ha) refuge (46% in Iowa, 54% in Nebraska) preserves an area that would have been otherwise lost to cultivation. In 1960, an Army Corps of Engineers channelization project on the Missouri River moved the main river channel in the area to the west. The former river channel became DeSoto Lake, a seven-mile long oxbow lake. As a result, part of the Nebraska portion of the refuge lies on the east side of the Missouri River.

For over 20 years after construction, the lake was used for recreational boating, with half of the lake designated for watersports and the other half a no-wake zone for wildlife habitat and fishing. The lake was so popular that access was limited by the park's rangers to keep the boat traffic down on the lake on Saturday and Sunday afternoons. The lake's marina, snack bar, swimming area and boat ramps were all removed, and restrictions were placed on boat operation.

Today, the refuge is home to around 30 mammal species, including white-tailed deer, beavers, opossums, raccoons, fox squirrels, muskrats and coyotes. Many bird species also inhabit the refuge, such as bald eagles, great blue herons, egrets, pelicans, turkeys and cardinals. The refuge is also a major stopover on the Central Flyway bird migration route; the population of migratory birds increases substantially in the spring and fall months. The numbers of snow geese used to frequently be in the hundreds of thousands, but for unknown reasons has substantially dropped for only a few thousand a year (not at once). The population of Canada geese that stopped at the lake before it was channelized is once again rising.

Several miles of nature trails provide access to the varied landscapes of the refuge. Dogs are permitted only under physical restrictive control of a leash at all times. Hunting is allowed in season (for deer, turkey, and pheasant) with a permit and there are several fishing piers along the lake, which are open outside of the bird migration seasons.

The refuge also documents the area's human history. In 1865, the sternwheel steamboat Bertrand, bound for the Montana Territory, sank in the Missouri River. The boat and its cargo rested on the river bottom until 1968, when the wreck was rediscovered. Over 500,000 items were excavated from the wreck; many of them were in excellent condition. Catalogue numbers are now in the upper 5000's, each number sometimes only having one related object, or, in the case of nails, tens of thousands. A visitor center in the refuge displays many of these items. The Bertrand site is listed on the National Register of Historic Places.

DeSoto National Wildlife Refuge is located five miles (eight kilometres) east of Blair, Nebraska. Access to the refuge is on U.S. Route 30 between Blair and Interstate 29.

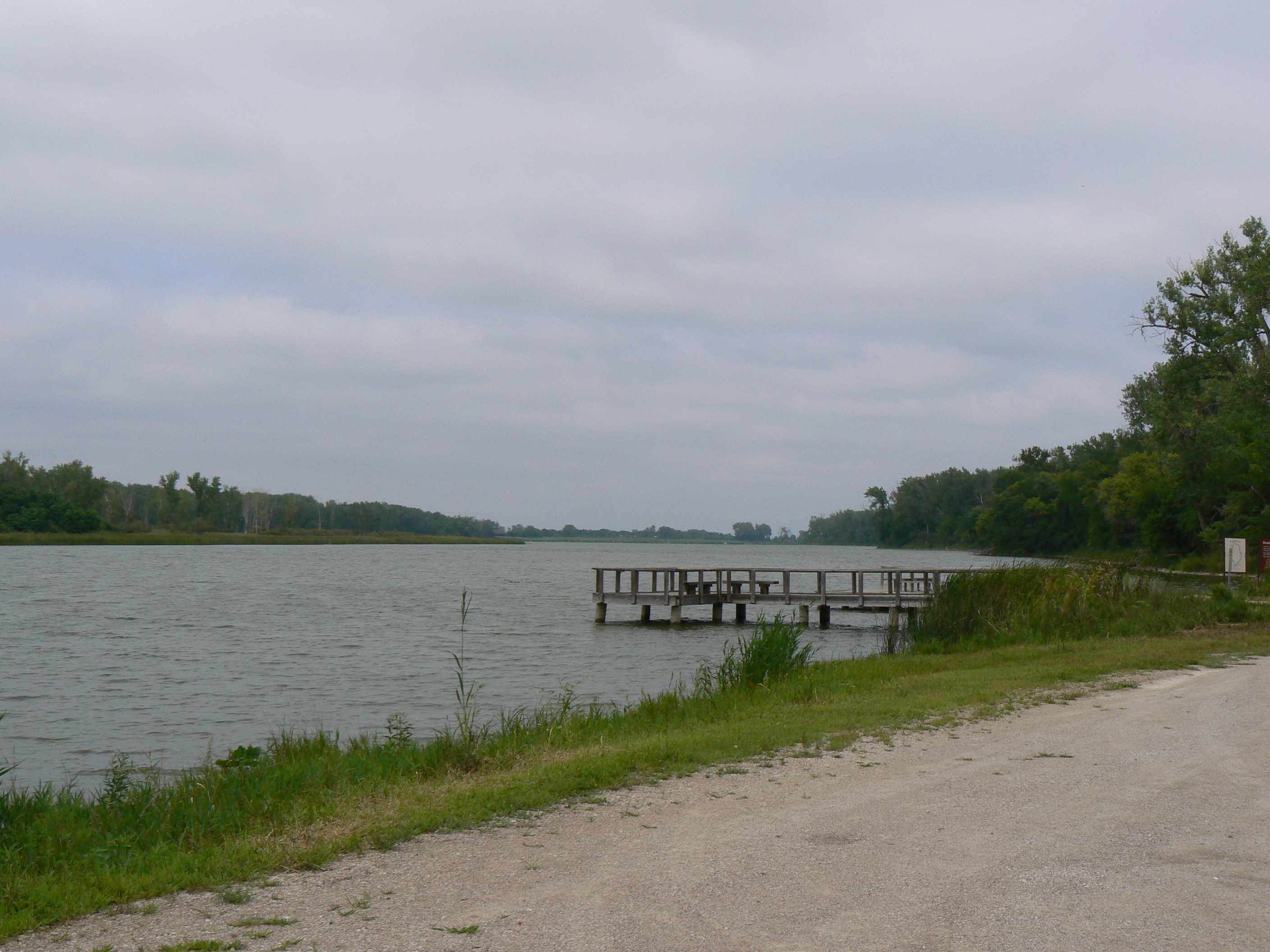
DeSoto Lake was once part of the Missouri River, but rechannelization projects cut a large bend out of the river, forming the lake at Desoto NWR

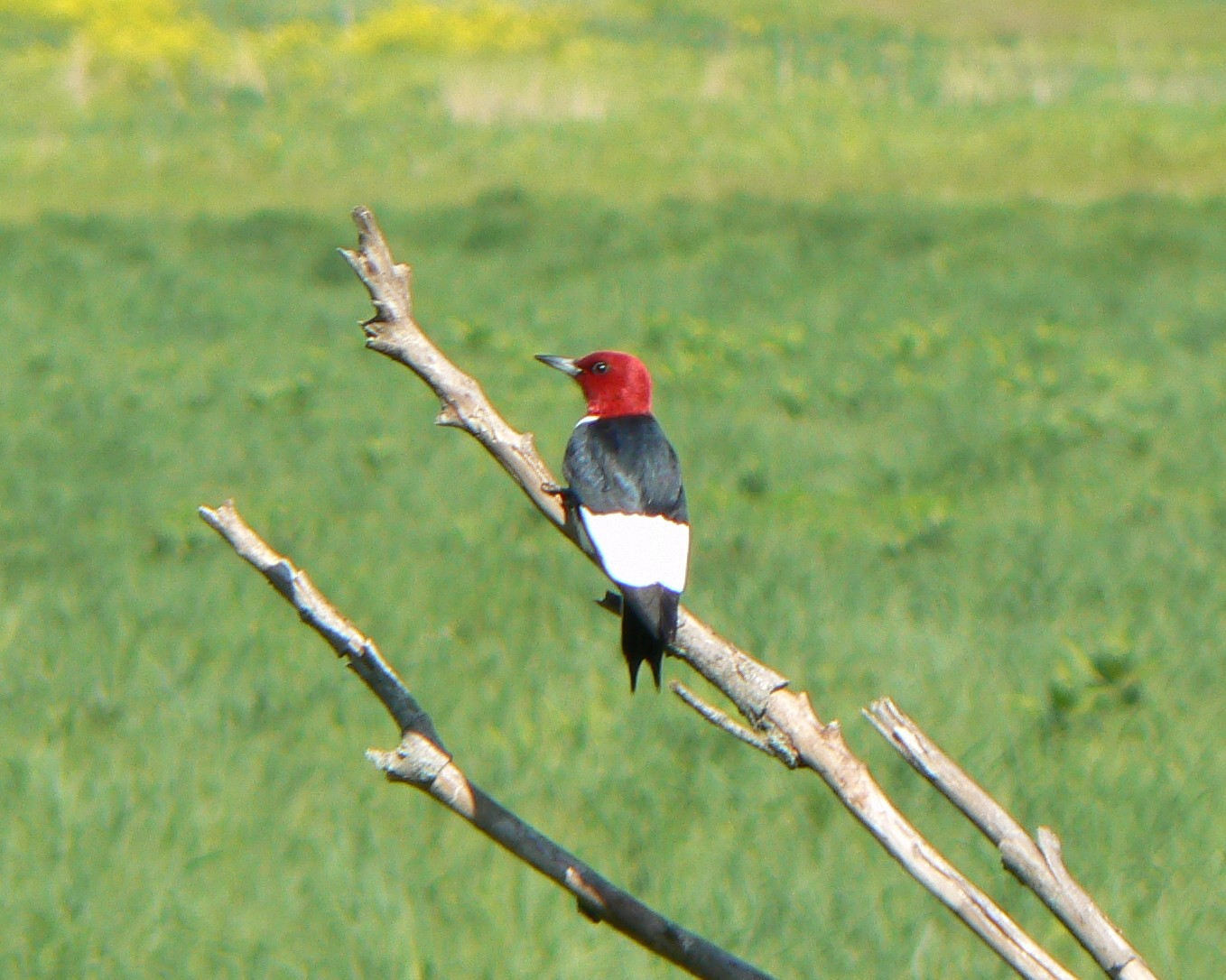
Red-headed woodpecker at DeSoto NWR.

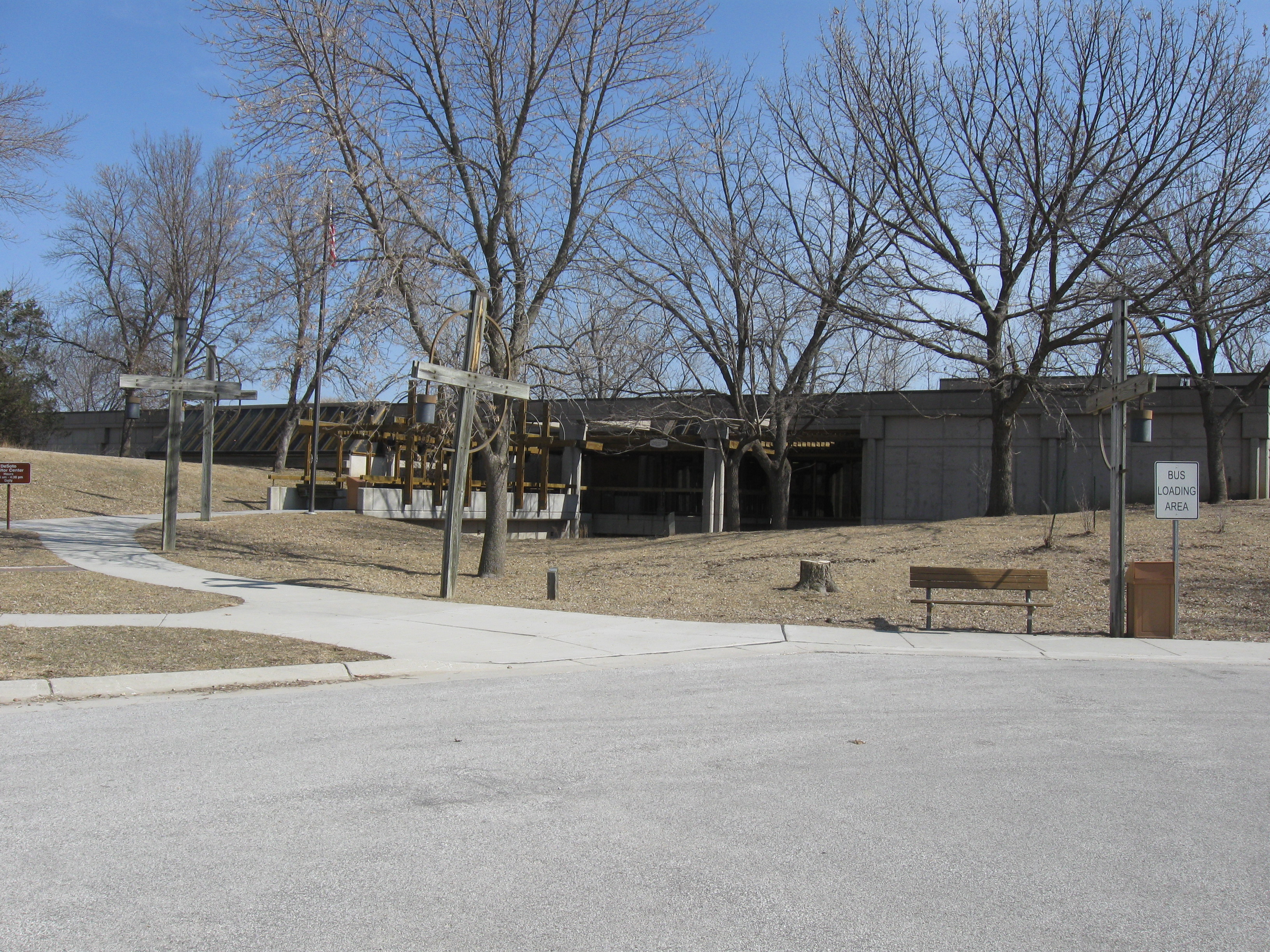
DeSoto NWR center, housing the Bertrand exhibit.

== See also ==
- Boyer Chute National Wildlife Refuge
- Fort Atkinson State Historic Park
