= List of American films of 1972 =

This is a list of American films released in 1972.

== Box office ==
The highest-grossing American films released in 1972, by domestic box office gross revenue as estimated by The Numbers, are as follows:

Highest-grossing films of 1972
Rank	Title	Distributor	Domestic gross
1	The Godfather	Paramount	$133,698,921
2	The Poseidon Adventure	20th Century Fox	$93,300,000
3	What's Up, Doc?	Warner Bros.	$57,142,740
4	Deliverance	Warner Bros.	$46,122,355
5	Deep Throat	Bryanston Distributing Company	$45,000,000
6	Jeremiah Johnson	Warner Bros.	$44,693,786
7	Cabaret	Allied Artists	$41,326,446
8	The Getaway	National General	$36,734,619
9	Last Tango in Paris	United Artists	$36,144,824
10	Lady Sings the Blues	Paramount	$19,726,490

== January–March ==
Opening		Title	Production company	Cast and crew	Ref.
J A N U A R Y	1	J. W. Coop	Columbia Pictures / Robertson and Associates	Cliff Robertson (director/screenplay); Gary Cartwright, Bud Shrake (screenplay); Cliff Robertson, Geraldine Page, Cristina Ferrare, R.G. Armstrong, John Crawford, Wade Crosby, Bruce Kirby, Larry Mahan, R.L. Armstrong, Marjorie Durant Dye, Paul Harper, Son Hooker, Richard Kennedy, Lowell D. Smith	
J A N U A R Y	7	Glass Houses	Columbia Pictures	Alexander Singer (director/screenplay); Judith Singer (screenplay); Bernard Barrow, Jennifer O'Neill, Philip Pine, Eve McVeagh, Deirdre Lenihan, Ann Summers	
J A N U A R Y	11	The Night Stalker	ABC Circle Films / Dan Curtis Productions / Buena Vista International	John Llewellyn Moxey (director); Richard Matheson (teleplay); Darren McGavin, Carol Lynley, Simon Oakland, Ralph Meeker, Claude Akins, Charles McGraw, Kent Smith, Elisha Cook Jr., Stanley Adams, Larry Linville, Jordan Rhodes, Barry Atwater	
J A N U A R Y	13	The Cowboys	Warner Bros.	Mark Rydell (director); Irving Ravetch, Harriet Frank Jr., William Dale Jennings (screenplay); John Wayne, Roscoe Lee Browne, Bruce Dern, Colleen Dewhurst, Robert Carradine, Stephen Hudis, A Martinez, Slim Pickens, Lonny Chapman, Charles Tyner, Sarah Cunningham, Allyn Ann McLerie, Matt Clark, Dick Farnsworth, Larry Finley, Tap Canutt, Chuck Courtney, Gary Epper, Tony Epper, Alfred Barker Jr., Nicolas Beauvy, Steve Benedict, Norman Howell Jr., Sean Kelly, Clay O'Brien, Sam O'Brien, Mike Pyeatt, Maggie Costain, Jerry Gatlin, Walter Scott, Wallace Brooks, Charise Cullin, Colette Poeppel, Norman Howell, Rita Hudis, Margaret Kelly, Larry Randles, Jim Burk, Fred Brookfield, Kent Hays, Glenn Randall Jr., Henry Wills, Joe Yrigoyen	
J A N U A R Y	14	Cisco Pike	Columbia Pictures	Bill L. Norton (director/screenplay); Kris Kristofferson, Karen Black, Gene Hackman, Harry Dean Stanton, Viva, Doug Sahm, Roscoe Lee Browne, Joy Bang, Severn Darden, Antonio Fargas, Don Sturdy, Allan Arbus, Wavy Gravy, Lorna Thayer, William Traylor, Richard Stahl, Doodles Weaver	
J A N U A R Y	20	To Find a Man	Columbia Pictures / Rastar	Buzz Kulik (director); Arnold Schulman (screenplay); Pamela Sue Martin, Darren O'Connor, Lloyd Bridges, Phyllis Newman, Tom Ewell, Tom Bosley, Miles Chapin, Schell Rasten, Antonia Rey, Vicki Sue Robinson, Rutanya Alda	
J A N U A R Y	21	X Y & Zee	Columbia Pictures / Zee Company	Brian G. Hutton (director); Edna O'Brien (screenplay); Elizabeth Taylor, Michael Caine, Susannah York, Margaret Leighton, John Standing, Michael Cashman, Richard O'Brien, Mary Larkin, Gino Melvazzi	
J A N U A R Y	26	The Hot Rock	20th Century Fox	Peter Yates (director); William Goldman (screenplay); Robert Redford, George Segal, Ron Leibman, Paul Sand, Moses Gunn, William Redfield, Topo Swope, Zero Mostel, Christopher Guest, Graham Jarvis, Charlotte Rae, Harry Bellaver, Lee Wallace, Gilbert Lewis, George Bartenieff, Ed Bernard, Albert Henderson, Robert Weil, Lynne Gordon, Fred Cook	
F E B R U A R Y	13	Cabaret	Allied Artists / ABC Pictures	Bob Fosse (director); Jay Allen (screenplay); Liza Minnelli, Michael York, Helmut Griem, Marisa Berenson, Fritz Wepper, Joel Grey, Elisabeth Neumann-Viertel, Helen Vita, Sigrid von Richthofen, Gerd Vespermann, Ralf Wolter, Ricky Renée, Kathryn Doby, Estrongo Nachama, Oliver Collignon, Mark Lambert	
F E B R U A R Y	14	Pocket Money	National General Pictures / First Artists	Stuart Rosenberg (director); Terrence Malick (screenplay); Paul Newman, Lee Marvin, Strother Martin, Wayne Rogers, Hector Elizondo, Christine Belford, Kelly Jean Peters, Gregory Sierra, Fred Graham, Matt Clark, Claudio Miranda, Terrence Malick	
F E B R U A R Y	26	The New Land (Sweden)	Warner Bros.	Jan Troell (director/screenplay); Bengt Forslund (screenplay); Max von Sydow, Liv Ullmann, Eddie Axberg, Allan Edwall, Monica Zetterlund, Pierre Lindstedt, Hans Alfredson, Agneta Prytz, Halvar Björk, Tom C. Fouts, Peter Lindgren, Per Oscarsson, Oscar Ljung, Karin Nordström, Eva-Lena Zetterlund	
M A R C H	8	Tales from the Crypt (U.K.)	Metromedia Producers Corporation / Amicus Productions	Freddie Francis (director); Milton Subotsky (screenplay); Joan Collins, Peter Cushing, Roy Dotrice, Richard Greene, Ian Hendry, Patrick Magee, Barbara Murray, Nigel Patrick, Robin Phillips, Ralph Richardson, Martin Boddey, Chloe Franks, Oliver MacGreevy, Angela Grant, Peter Fraser, David Markham, Robert Hutton, Clifford Earl, Edward Evans, Harry Locke, Geoffrey Bayldon, Robert Rietti, John Barrard, Susan Denny, Frank Forsyth, Manning Wilson, Irene Gawne, Stafford Medhurst, George Herbert	
M A R C H	10	Frogs	American International Pictures	George McCowan (director); Robert Hutchison, Robert Blees (screenplay); Ray Milland, Sam Elliott, Joan Van Ark, Adam Roarke, Lynn Borden, Judy Pace, Mae Mercer, Dale Willingham, Hal Hodges, David Gilliam, Nicholas Cortland, George Skaff, Hollis Irving, Lance Taylor Sr.	
M A R C H	10	Silent Running	Universal Pictures	Douglas Trumbull (director); Deric Washburn, Michael Cimino, Steven Bochco (screenplay); Bruce Dern, Cliff Potts, Ron Rifkin, Jesse Vint, Mark Persons, Cheryl Sparks, Steven Brown, Larry Whisenhunt	
M A R C H	10	What's Up, Doc?	Warner Bros. / Saticoy Productions	Peter Bogdanovich (director); Buck Henry, David Newman, Robert Benton (screenplay); Barbra Streisand, Ryan O'Neal, Madeline Kahn, Austin Pendleton, Kenneth Mars, Michael Murphy, Stefan Gierasch, Sorrell Booke, Philip Roth, Mabel Albertson, Liam Dunn, John Hillerman, George Morfogen, Graham Jarvis, Randy Quaid, M. Emmet Walsh, Jack Perkins, Gil Perkins, Christa Lang, Don Bexley, John Byner, William Niven, Mel Blanc, Arthur Q. Bryan	
M A R C H	12	Godzilla vs. Gigan – (Japan)	Toho	Jun Fukuda (director); Shinichi Sekizawa (screenplay); Hiroshi Ishikawa, Tomoko Umeda, Yuriko Hishimi, Minoru Takashima, Zan Fujita, Toshiaki Nishizawa, Kunio Murai, Gen Shimizu, Kuniko Ashihara, Zeko Nakamura, Haruo Nakajima, Kenpachiro Satsuma, Koetsu Omiya, Kanta Ina	
M A R C H	15	Corky	Metro-Goldwyn-Mayer	Leonard Horn (director); Eugene Price (screenplay); Robert Blake, Charlotte Rampling, Patrick O'Neal, Christopher Connelly, Pamela Payton-Wright, Ben Johnson, Laurence Luckinbill, Paul Stevens, Bobby Allison, Donnie Allison, Buddy Baker, Richard Petty, Cale Yarborough, Charlie Briggs, Jack Garner, Lulu Roman, John Marriott, Glen Wood	
M A R C H	15	Slaughterhouse-Five	Universal Pictures / Cinema International Corporation	George Roy Hill (director); Stephen Geller (screenplay); Michael Sacks, Ron Leibman, Eugene Roche, Sharon Gans, Valerie Perrine, Holly Near, Perry King, Kevin Conway, Friedrich von Ledebur, Ekkehardt Belle, Sorrell Booke, Roberts Blossom, John Dehner, Gary Waynesmith, Richard Schaal, Gilmer McCormick, Stan Gottlieb, Karl-Otto Alberty, Henry Bumstead, Lucille Benson, John Wood, Alexander Allerson, Barbara Frey, Warren Frost, Paul Hansard, Richard Stahl	
M A R C H	17	Pink Flamingos	New Line Cinema / Dreamland	John Waters (director/screenplay); Divine, David Lochary, Mink Stole, Mary Vivian Pearce, Danny Mills, Edith Massey, Cookie Mueller, Channing Wilroy, Paul Swift, Susan Walsh, Linda Olgierson, Pat Moran, Steve Yeager, George Figgs, Vincent Peranio, Van Smith, Elizabeth Coffey, David E. Gluck, John Waters	
M A R C H	22	The Biscuit Eater	Walt Disney Productions / Buena Vista Distribution	Vincent McEveety (director); Lawrence Edward Watkin (screenplay); Earl Holliman, Pat Crowley, Lew Ayres, Godfrey Cambridge, Beah Richards, Clifton James, Johnny Whitaker, Mantan Moreland, George Spell, Rolph Van Wolfgang	
M A R C H	22	Fist of Fury	Golden Harvest	Lo Wei (director/screenplay); Bruce Lee, Nora Miao, Riki Hashimoto, Robert Baker, Tien Feng, Paul Wei, Fung Ngai, Lo Wei, Huang Tsung-hsing, Han Ying-chieh, James Tien, Maria Yi, Jun Katsumura, Lee Kwan, Jackie Chan, Corey Yuen	
M A R C H	23	The Concert for Bangladesh	20th Century Fox / Apple Films	Saul Swimmer (director); George Harrison, Ravi Shankar, Bob Dylan, Ringo Starr, Leon Russell, Billy Preston, Eric Clapton, Klaus Voormann, Jim Keltner, Badfinger, Jesse Ed Davis, Kamala Chakravarty, Claudia Lennear, Don Nix, Don Preston, Alla Rakha, Mal Evans, Allen Klein, Phil Spector, The Hollywood Horns, Allan Beutler, Jo Green, Jeany Greene, Marlin Greene, Dolores Hall, Jacky Kelso, Ustad Aliakbar Khan, Lew McCreary, Carl Radie	
M A R C H	24	The Godfather	Paramount Pictures / Alfran Productions	Francis Ford Coppola (director/screenplay); Mario Puzo (screenplay); Marlon Brando, Al Pacino, James Caan, Richard Castellano, Robert Duvall, Sterling Hayden, John Marley, Richard Conte, Al Lettieri, Diane Keaton, Abe Vigoda, Talia Shire, Gianni Russo, John Cazale, Rudy Bond, Al Martino, Morgana King, Lenny Montana, Johnny Martino, Salvatore Corsitto, Richard Bright, Alex Rocco, Tony Giorgio, Vito Scotti, Victor Rendina, Jeannie Linero, Julie Gregg, Simonetta Stefanelli, Angelo Infanti, Corrado Gaipa, Franco Citti, Saro Urzi, Frank Albanese, Carmine Coppola, Gian-Carlo Coppola, Italia Coppola, Roman Coppola, Sofia Coppola, Randy Jurgensen, Tony King, Paul Lambert, Tony Lip, Tom Rosqui, Giacomo Rossi Stuart, Frank Sivero, Joe Spinell, Nick Vallelonga, Ilene Woods	
M A R C H	24	The Ten Commandments (re-release)	Paramount Pictures / Motion Picture Associates	Cecil B. DeMille (director); Aeneas MacKenzie, Jesse L. Lasky Jr., Jack Gariss, Fredric M. Frank (screenplay); Charlton Heston, Yul Brynner, Anne Baxter, Edward G. Robinson, Yvonne De Carlo, Debra Paget, John Derek, Sir Cedric Hardwicke, Nina Foch, Martha Scott, Judith Anderson, Vincent Price, John Carradine, Olive Deering, Douglas Dumbrille, Frank de Kova, Henry Wilcoxon, Eduard Franz, Donald Curtis, Lawrence Dobkin, H.B. Warner, Julia Faye, Joanna Merlin, Fraser Heston, John Miljan, Francis J. McDonald, Ian Keith, Paul De Rolf, Woodrow Strode, Joan Woodbury, Kathy Garver, Cecil B. DeMille, Lisa Mitchell, Noelle Williams, Pat Richard, Joyce Vanderveen, Diane Hall, Abbas El Boughdadly, Tommy Duran, Eugene Mazzola, Ramsay Hill, Esther Brown, Babette Bain	
M A R C H	29	The Carey Treatment	Metro-Goldwyn-Mayer / Geoffrey Productions	Blake Edwards (director); James P. Bonner (screenplay); James Coburn, Jennifer O'Neill, Pat Hingle, Elizabeth Allen, John Fink, Dan O'Herlihy, James Hong, Alex Dreier, Michael Blodgett, Regis Toomey, Jennifer Edwards, John Hillerman, Robert Mandan, Robie Porter, Dick Crockett, Stephen Manley, Ed Peck, Skye Aubrey, Steve Carlson, Rosemary Edelman, Warren Parker	

== April–June ==
Opening		Title	Production company	Cast and crew	Ref.
A P R I L	12	Fritz the Cat	Cinemation Industries / Fritz Productions / Aurica Finance Company / Krantz Films	Ralph Bakshi (director/screenplay); Skip Hinnant, Rosetta LeNoire, John McCurry, Phil Seuling, Judy Engles, Ralph Bakshi, Mary Dean, Charles Spidar	
A P R I L	16	The Culpepper Cattle Co.	20th Century Fox	Dick Richards (director/screenplay); Eric Bercovici, Gregory Prentiss (screenplay); Gary Grimes, Billy "Green" Bush, Luke Askew, Bo Hopkins, Geoffrey Lewis, Raymond Guth, Wayne Sutherlin, Matt Clark, Anthony James, Charles Martin Smith, Gregory Sierra	
A P R I L	28	Buck and the Preacher	Columbia Pictures / E & R Productions / Belafonte Enterprises	Sidney Poitier (director); Ernest Kinoy (screenplay); Sidney Poitier, Harry Belafonte, Ruby Dee, Cameron Mitchell, Denny Miller, Nita Talbot, James McEachin, Clarence Muse, Enrique Lucero, Julie Robinson, Lynn Robinson	
A P R I L	28	Five Fingers of Death (Hong Kong)	Shaw Brothers Studio	Jeong Chang-hwa (director); Chiang Yang (screenplay); Lo Lieh, Wang Ping, Tien Feng, Wang Chin-feng, Tung Lam, Fang Mian, Ku Wen-Chung	
A P R I L	30	Vampire Circus (U.K.)	20th Century Fox / Hammer Film Productions	Robert Young (director); Judson Kinberg (screenplay); Adrienne Corri, Laurence Payne, Thorley Walters, Lynne Frederick, John Moulder-Brown, Elizabeth Seal, Anthony Higgins, Domini Blythe, Robin Hunter, Robin Sachs, Lalla Ward, David Prowse, Mary Wimbush, David de Keyser, Richard Owens, Robert Tayman, Skip Martin, Christina Paul, Roderick Shaw, Barnaby Shaw, John Bown, Sibylla Kay, Jane Darby, Dorothy Frere, Milovan Vesnitch, Serena, Sean Hewitt	
M A Y	4	Play It Again, Sam	Paramount Pictures / APJAC Productions	Herbert Ross (director); Woody Allen (screenplay); Woody Allen, Diane Keaton, Tony Roberts, Jerry Lacy, Susan Anspach, Jennifer Salt, Joy Bang, Viva, Susanne Zenor, Michael Greene, Ted Markland, Humphrey Bogart, Ingrid Bergman, Jean De Briac, Mark Goddard, Paul Henreid, Claude Rains	
M A Y	12	The Great Northfield Minnesota Raid	Universal Pictures / Robertson and Associates	Philip Kaufman (director/screenplay); Cliff Robertson, Robert Duvall, Luke Askew, R.G. Armstrong, Dana Elcar, Donald Moffat, John Pearce, Matt Clark, Robert H. Harris, Jack Manning, Elisha Cook, Royal Dano, William Callaway, Arthur Peterson, Barry Brown, Liam Dunn, Anne Barton, Valda Hansen, Wayne Sutherlin, Mary-Robin Redd, Craig Curtis, Nellie Burt, Madeleine Taylor Holmes, Herbert Nelson, Erik Holland, Marjorie Durant, Inger Stratton	
M A Y	12	Hammersmith Is Out	Cinerama Releasing Corporation / J. Cornelius Crean Films Inc.	Peter Ustinov (director); Stanford Whitmore (screenplay); Elizabeth Taylor, Richard Burton, Peter Ustinov, Beau Bridges, Leon Ames, Leon Askin, Anthony Holland, George Raft, John Schuck, Marjorie Eaton, Linda Gaye Scott	
M A Y	17	The Honkers	United Artists / Brighton Pictures / Levy-Gardner-Laven	Steve Ihnat (director/screenplay); Stephen Lodge (screenplay); James Coburn, Lois Nettleton, Slim Pickens, Anne Archer, Richard Anderson, Jim Davis, Ramon Bieri, Teddy Eccles, Mitchell Ryan, Wayne McLaren, John Harmon, Richard O'Brien, Larry Mahan, Joan Huntington, Pitt Herbert, Luther Elmore, Chuck Parkison Jr.	
M A Y	19	Carry On Matron	The Rank Organisation	Gerald Thomas (director); Talbot Rothwell (screenplay); Sid James, Kenneth Williams, Charles Hawtrey, Joan Sims, Hattie Jacques, Bernard Bresslaw, Kenneth Cope, Terry Scott, Barbara Windsor, Kenneth Connor, Jacki Piper, Bill Maynard, Patsy Rowlands, Derek Francis, Amelia Bayntun, Valerie Leon, Brian Osborne, Gwendolyn Watts, Valerie Shute, Margaret Nolan, Michael Nightingale, Wendy Richard, Bill Kenwright, Robin Hunter, Jack Douglas, Madeline Smith, Juliet Harmer	
M A Y	24	The Possession of Joel Delaney	Paramount Pictures / Haworth Productions / ITC Entertainment	Waris Hussein (director); Grimes Grice, Matt Robinson (screenplay); Shirley MacLaine, Perry King, Michael Hordern, Barbara Trentham, Míriam Colón, Earle Hyman, Lovelady Powell, David Elliott, Lisa Kohane, Edmundo Rivera Álvarez, Teodorina Bello, Robert Burr, Ernesto Gonzalez, Aukie Herger, Marita Lindholm	
M A Y	24	Skyjacked	Metro-Goldwyn-Mayer / Walter Seltzer Productions, Inc.	John Guillermin (director); Stanley R. Greenberg (screenplay); Charlton Heston, Yvette Mimieux, James Brolin, Claude Akins, Jeanne Crain, Susan Dey, Roosevelt Grier, Mariette Hartley, Walter Pidgeon, Ken Swofford, Leslie Uggams, Ross Elliott, Nicholas Hammond, Mike Henry, John Hillerman, Maureen Connell, John Fiedler, Wesley Lau, Roy Engel, Lorna Thayer, Dan White, Natividad Vacío, Jayson William Kane, Toni Clayton, Kelley Miles, Jack Denbo, Joe Canutt, Grahame Pratt	
M A Y	25	Chato's Land	United Artists / Scimitar Films	Michael Winner (director); Gerald Wilson (screenplay); Charles Bronson, Jack Palance, James Whitmore, Simon Oakland, Richard Basehart, Ralph Waite, Richard Jordan, Victor French, William Watson, Roddy McMillan, Paul Young, Lee Patterson, Peter Dyneley, Hugh McDermott, Sonia Rangan, Raúl Castro, Verna Harvey	
M A Y	25	Z.P.G.	Paramount Pictures / Sagittarius Productions	Michael Campus (director); Frank De Felitta, Max Ehrlich (screenplay); Oliver Reed, Geraldine Chaplin, Don Gordon, Diane Cilento, David Markham, Bill Nagy, Sheila Reid, Aubrey Woods, Birgitte Federspiel, Wayne Rodda, Ditte Maria Wiberg	
M A Y	26	The Other	20th Century Fox	Robert Mulligan (director); Thomas Tryon (screenplay); Uta Hagen, Diana Muldaur, Norma Connolly, Victor French, Lou Frizzell, John Ritter, Jenny Sullivan, Portia Nelson, Jack Collins, Chris Udvarnoky, Martin Udvarnoky, Loretta Leversee, Clarence Crow	
M A Y	31	The Final Comedown	New World Pictures	Oscar Williams (director/screenplay); Billy Dee Williams, D'Urville Martin, Celia Kaye, Edmund Cambridge, Billy Durkin, Raymond St. Jacques, R.G. Armstrong, Maidie Norman, Morris Erby, Pamela Jones	
J U N E	2	The War Between Men and Women	National General Pictures / Cinema Center Films	Melville Shavelson (director/screenplay); Danny Arnold, James Thurber (screenplay); Jack Lemmon, Barbara Harris, Jason Robards, Herb Edelman, Lisa Gerritsen, Moosie Drier, Severn Darden, Lisa Eilbacher, Lucille Meredith, Ruth McDevitt, John Zaremba, Bill Hickman, Dr. Joyce Brothers, Danny Arnold	
J U N E	4	A Day in the Death of Joe Egg	Columbia Pictures / Domino	Peter Medak (director); Peter Nichols (screenplay); Alan Bates, Janet Suzman, Peter Bowles, Sheila Gish, Joan Hickson, Murray Melvin, Fanny Carby, Constance Chapman, Elizabeth Robillard, Elizabeth Tyrell	
J U N E	12	Deep Throat	Bryanston Distributing Company	Gerard Damiano (director/screenplay); Linda Lovelace, Harry Reems, Carol Connors, Gerard Damiano, Dolly Sharp, Bill Harrison, William Love, Bob Phillips, Ted Street, John Byron, Jack Birch, Ron Wertheim, Weston Enciso	
J U N E	14	Fillmore	20th Century Fox	Richard T. Heffron, Eli F. Bleich (directors); Bill Graham, Santana, Grateful Dead, Jefferson Airplane, Hot Tuna, Quicksilver Messenger Service, Lamb, Cold Blood, The Rowan Brothers, New Riders of the Purple Sage, It's a Beautiful Day, The Elvin Bishop Group, Boz Scaggs, Papa John Creach, Mike Bloomfield	
J U N E	14	Boxcar Bertha	American International Pictures	Martin Scorsese (director); Joyce Hooper Corrington, John William Corrington (screenplay); Barbara Hershey, David Carradine, Barry Primus, Bernie Casey, John Carradine, Victor Argo, Harry Northup, Martin Scorsese, Franklin D. Roosevelt, David Osterhout, Grahame Pratt, 'Chicken' Holleman, Ann Morell, Marianne Dole, Joe Reynolds	
J U N E	16	The Strange Vengeance of Rosalie	20th Century Fox / Palomar Pictures	Jack Starrett (director); Anthony Greville-Bell, John Kohn (screenplay); Bonnie Bedelia, Ken Howard, Anthony Zerbe	
J U N E	19	One Is a Lonely Number	Metro-Goldwyn-Mayer	Mel Stuart (director); David Seltzer (screenplay); Trish Van Devere, Monte Markham, Janet Leigh, Melvyn Douglas, Jane Elliot, Jonathan Lippe, Paul Jenkins, A. Scott Beach, Dudley Knight, Maurice Argent, Joseph Spano, Kathleen Quinlan, Mark Bramhall, Henry Leff, Thomas McNallan, Morgan Upton, Kim Allen, Peter Fitzsimmons, Christopher Brooks	
J U N E	20	The Assassination of Trotsky (U.K.)	Cinerama Releasing Corporation / Dino de Laurentiis Cinematografica / Compagnia Internazionale Alessandra Cinematografica / Cinétel	Joseph Losey (director); Nicholas Mosley (screenplay); Richard Burton, Alain Delon, Romy Schneider, Valentina Cortese, Luigi Vannucchi, Jean Desailly, Simone Valère, Duilio Del Prete, Jack Betts, Michael Forest, Claudio Brook, Joshua Sinclair, Giorgio Albertazzi	
J U N E	21	Shaft's Big Score!	Metro-Goldwyn-Mayer	Gordon Parks (director); Ernest Tidyman (screenplay); Richard Roundtree, Moses Gunn, Drew Bundini Brown, Joe Mascolo, Wally Taylor, Julius Harris, Rosalind Miles, Joe Santos, Robert Kya-Hill, Thomas Anderson, Frank Adonis, Cihangir Ghaffari, Kathy Imrie, Don Blakely, Angelo Gnazzo, Henry Ferrentino, Melvin Green Jr., Dan Hannafin, Marilyn Hamlin, Kitty Jones, Evelyn Davis	
J U N E	21	Beware! The Blob	Jack H. Harris Enterprises Inc.	Larry Hagman (director); Anthony Harris, Jack Woods (screenplay); Robert Walker Jr., Gwynne Gilford, Richard Stahl, Richard Webb, Marlene Clark, Gerrit Graham, J.J. Johnston, Dick Van Patten, Randy Stonehill, Cindy Williams, Larry Norman, Bill Coontz, Shelley Berman, Godfrey Cambridge, Larry Hagman, Carol Lynley, Burgess Meredith, Danny Goldman, Rockne Tarkington, Sid Haig, Del Close, Robert N. Goodman, Byron Keith, Tiger Joe Marsh, Fred Smoot, Preston Hagman, Conrad Rothmann, John Houser, Patrick McAllister, Margie Adleman	
J U N E	21	Frenzy	Universal Pictures	Alfred Hitchcock (director); Anthony Shaffer (screenplay); Jon Finch, Alec McCowen, Barry Foster, Billie Whitelaw, Anna Massey, Barbara Leigh-Hunt, Bernard Cribbins, Vivien Merchant, Michael Bates, Jean Marsh, Clive Swift, Madge Ryan, Elsie Randolph, John Boxer, Jimmy Gardner, Gerald Sim, Noel Johnson, Rita Webb, Michael Sheard, Richard Stapley, Susan Travers, Joby Blanshard, John Cater, Gerry Cowper, Maxwell Craig, Charles Farrell, Harry Fielder, Drewe Henley, Alfred Hitchcock, Doreen Mantle, Margaret Nolan, Colin Spaull, Fred Wood, Martin Wyldeck	
J U N E	21	The Groundstar Conspiracy	Universal Pictures / Hal Roach Studios	Lamont Johnson (director); Douglas Heyes (screenplay); George Peppard, Michael Sarrazin, Christine Belford, Cliff Potts, James Olson, Tim O'Connor, James McEachin, Alan Oppenheimer	
J U N E	21	The Revengers	National General Pictures / Cinema Center Films / Estudios Churubusco Azteca S.A.	Daniel Mann (director); Wendell Mayes (screenplay); William Holden, Ernest Borgnine, Woody Strode, Roger Hanin, Susan Hayward, René Koldehoff, Jorge Martínez de Hoyos, Arthur Hunnicutt, Warren Vanders, Larry Pennell, James Daughton, Scott Holden, John Kelly, Lorraine Chanel, Jorge Luke, Raúl Pérez Prieto, Carlos Amez Rocha	
J U N E	23	Ben	Cinerama Releasing Corporation / Bing Crosby Productions	Phil Karlson (director); Gilbert Ralston (screenplay); Lee Harcourt Montgomery, Joseph Campanella, Arthur O'Connell, Rosemary Murphy, Meredith Baxter, Paul Carr, Kenneth Tobey, James Luisi, Lee Paul, Norman Alden, Scott Garrett, Ric Drasin, Bruce Davison, Kaz Garas, Richard Van Vleet, Arlen Stuart, Ben Crowe, St. Benjamin	
J U N E	28	Prime Cut	National General Pictures / Cinema Center Films	Michael Ritchie (director); Robert Dillon (screenplay); Lee Marvin, Gene Hackman, Angel Tompkins, Gregory Walcott, Sissy Spacek, Howard Platt, Les Lannom, Eddie Egan, Janit Baldwin, William Morey, Clint Ellison, Therese Reinsch, Bob Wilson, Gordon Signer, Gladys Watson, Wayne Savagne	
J U N E	29	The Candidate	Warner Bros.	Michael Ritchie (director); Jeremy Larner (screenplay); Robert Redford, Peter Boyle, Melvyn Douglas, Don Porter, Allen Garfield, Karen Carlson, Quinn Redeker, Michael Lerner, Kenneth Tobey, Jenny Sullivan, Gerald Hiken, Mike Barnicle, Broderick Crawford, George McGovern, Howard K. Smith, Hubert Humphrey, Alan Cranston, John V. Tunney, Terry McGovern, Natalie Wood, Sam Yorty, Jesse M. Unruh, Bill Stout, Morgan Upton, Christopher Pray, Joe Miksak, Tom Dahlgren, Leslie Allen, Van Amberg	
J U N E	29	Come Back, Charleston Blue	Warner Bros.	Mark Warren (director); Peggy Elliott, Bontche Schweig (screenplay); Godfrey Cambridge, Raymond St. Jacques, Percy Rodriguez, Jonelle Allen, Minnie Gentry, Leonardo Cimino, Philip Michael Thomas, Peter Deanda, Maxwell Glanville, Dick Sabol, Toney Brealond, Tim Pelt, Marcia McBroom, Darryl Knibb, Joseph Ray, Adam Wade, Dorothi Fox	
J U N E	30	Conquest of the Planet of the Apes	20th Century Fox / APJAC Productions	J. Lee Thompson (director); Paul Dehn (screenplay); Roddy McDowall, Don Murray, Ricardo Montalbán, Natalie Trundy, Hari Rhodes, Severn Darden, Lou Wagner, John Randolph, H.M. Wynant, Buck Kartalian, Paul Comi, Gordon Jump, Asa Maynor, David Chow, John Dennis, Dick Spangler	

== July–September ==
Opening		Title	Production company	Cast and crew	Ref.
J U L Y	2	Cool Breeze	Metro-Goldwyn-Mayer / Penelope Productions	Barry Pollack (director/screenplay); Thalmus Rasulala, Jim Watkins, Judy Pace, Lincoln Kilpatrick, Sam Laws, Raymond St. Jacques, Margaret Avery, Pam Grier, Paula Kelly, Wally Taylor, Rudy Challenger, Stewart Bradley, Ed Cambridge, Royce Wallace, Stack Pierce, Biff Elliot, John Lupton	
J U L Y	5	Dr. Phibes Rises Again	American International Pictures	Robert Fuest (director/screenplay); Robert Blees (screenplay); Vincent Price, Robert Quarry, Valli Kemp, Peter Jeffrey, Fiona Lewis, Hugh Griffith, Peter Cushing, Beryl Reid, Terry-Thomas, John Cater, Gerald Sim, Lewis Fiander, John Thaw, Keith Buckley, Milton Reid, John Comer, Caroline Munro, Gary Owens	
J U L Y	5	Napoleon and Samantha	Walt Disney Productions / Buena Vista Distribution	Bernard McEveety (director); Stewart Raffill (screenplay); Johnny Whitaker, Jodie Foster, Michael Douglas, Will Geer, Arch Johnson, Henry Jones, Vito Scotti, John Crawford, Mary Wickes, Ellen Corby, Rex Holman, John Lupton, Zamba, James MacDonald, Claude Johnson, John Ortega, Monty Margetts	
J U L Y	6	Butterflies Are Free	Columbia Pictures	Milton Katselas (director); Leonard Gershe (screenplay); Goldie Hawn, Eileen Heckart, Edward Albert, Paul Michael Glaser, Michael Warren	
J U L Y	12	Now You See Him, Now You Don't	Walt Disney Productions / Buena Vista Distribution	Robert Butler (director); Joseph L. McEveety (screenplay); Kurt Russell, Cesar Romero, Joe Flynn, Jim Backus, William Windom, Michael McGreevey, Ed Begley Jr., Richard Bakalyan, Joyce Menges, Alan Hewitt, Kelly Thordsen, Bing Russell, Edward Andrews, George O'Hanlon, John Myhers, Frank Welker, Mike Evans, Pat Delany, Robert Rothwell	
J U L Y	14	Fuzz	United Artists / Filmways / Martin Ransohoff Productions	Richard A. Colla (director); Evan Hunter (screenplay); Burt Reynolds, Jack Weston, Tom Skerritt, Yul Brynner, Raquel Welch, James McEachin, Bert Remsen, Steve Ihnat, Peter Bonerz, Don Gordon, Dan Frazer, Norman Burton, Vince Howard, Brian Doyle-Murray, Charles Tyner, Neile Adams, Tamara Dobson, Charles Martin Smith, Robert Jaffe, Stewart Moss, James Victor, Royce D. Applegate, Britt Leach, Peter Elbling, Gary Morgan, Albert Popwell, Gino Conforti, Gerald Hiken, Martine Bartlett, Peter Brocco, Jack Perkins, Dominic Chianese, Richard Stahl, Uschi Digard, Anne Lockhart, Ron Rifkin	
J U L Y	14	Joe Kidd	Universal Pictures / The Malpaso Company	John Sturges (director); Elmore Leonard (screenplay); Clint Eastwood, Robert Duvall, John Saxon, Don Stroud, Stella Garcia, James Wainwright, Paul Koslo, Gregory Walcott, Dick Van Patten, Lynne Marta, John Carter, Pepe Hern, Joaquín Martínez, Ron Soble, Pepe Callahan, Clint Ritchie, Chuck Hayward, Steve Eastin, Read Morgan	
J U L Y	14	The Wrath of God	Metro-Goldwyn-Mayer	Ralph Nelson (director/screenplay); Jack Higgins (screenplay); Robert Mitchum, Frank Langella, John Colicos, Victor Buono, Rita Hayworth, Ken Hutchison, Gregory Sierra, Frank Ramirez, Enrique Lucero, Chano Urueta, Aurora Clavel, Pancho Córdova, Ralph Nelson, Paula Pritchett, Jorge Russek, José Luis Parades, Victor Eberg, Guillermo Hernández	
J U L Y	19	The Man	Paramount Pictures / ABC Circle Films / Lorimar	Joseph Sargent (director); Rod Serling (screenplay); James Earl Jones, Martin Balsam, Burgess Meredith, Lew Ayres, William Windom, Barbara Rush, Georg Stanford Brown, Janet MacLachlan, Martin E. Brooks, Simon Scott, Patric Knowles, Robert DoQui, Anne Seymour, Edward Faulkner, Philip Bourneuf, Reginald Fenderson, Garry Walberg, Ted Hartley, Charles Lampkin, Lawrence Cook, Vince Howard, Leonard Stone, Howard K. Smith, Jack Benny, Curt Conway, Gilbert Green, Lew Brown, Elizabeth Ross, Barry Russo, Bill Lawrence	
J U L Y	19	The Thing with Two Heads	American International Pictures	Lee Frost (director/screenplay); Wes Bishop, James Gordon White (screenplay); Ray Milland, Rosey Grier, Don Marshall, Roger Perry, Kathy Baumann, Chelsea Brown, John Dullaghan, Lee Frost, Rick Baker, John Bliss, Jane Kellem, Rod Steele, Wes Bishop	
J U L Y	22	The Big Bird Cage	New World Pictures	Jack Hill (director/screenplay); Pam Grier, Anitra Ford, Carol Speed, Sid Haig, Marissa Delgado, Vic Diaz, Candice Roman, Teda Bracci, Karen McKevic, Andres Centenera, Zenaida Amador	
J U L Y	26	Fat City	Columbia Pictures / Rastar	John Huston (director); Leonard Gardner (screenplay); Stacy Keach, Jeff Bridges, Susan Tyrrell, Candy Clark, Nicholas Colasanto, Art Aragon, Curtis Cokes, Al Silvani, Sixto Rodriguez, Alfred Avila, Billy Walker, Wayne Mahan, Ruben Navarro, Álvaro López	
J U L Y	26	Night of the Lepus	Metro-Goldwyn-Mayer / A.C. Lyles Productions	William F. Claxton (director); Don Holliday, Gene R. Kearney (screenplay); Stuart Whitman, Janet Leigh, Rory Calhoun, DeForest Kelley, Paul Fix, Melanie Fullerton, Chuck Hayward, William Elliott, Don Starr, David McCallum, Isaac Stanford Jolley, Jerry Dunphy, Chris Morrell, Henry Wills, Francesca Jarvis, Robert Hardy, Richard Jacome, Evans Thornton, Robert Gooden	
J U L Y	30	Deliverance	Warner Bros. / Elmer Enterprises	John Boorman (director); James Dickey (screenplay); Jon Voight, Burt Reynolds, Ned Beatty, Ronny Cox, Bill McKinney, Herbert "Cowboy" Coward, James Dickey, Billy Redden, Macon McCalman, Seamon Glass, Charley Boorman, Belinda Beatty	
A U G U S T	1	The Magnificent Seven Ride!	United Artists / The Mirisch Production Company	George McCowan (director); Arthur Rowe (screenplay); Lee Van Cleef, Stefanie Powers, Michael Callan, Luke Askew, Ralph Waite, Mariette Hartley, Pedro Armendáriz Jr., William Lucking, James B. Sikking, Ed Lauter, Allyn Ann McLerie, Gary Busey, Robert Jaffe, Darrell Larson, Carolyn Conwell, Jason Wingreen, Melissa Murphy, Elizabeth Thompson, Ron Stein, Rita Rogers	
A U G U S T	2	Junior Bonner	Cinerama Releasing Corporation / ABC Pictures / Joe Wizan-Booth Gardner Productions / Solar Productions	Sam Peckinpah (director); Jeb Rosebrook (screenplay); Steve McQueen, Robert Preston, Ida Lupino, Joe Don Baker, Barbara Leigh, Ben Johnson, Mary Murphy, Bill McKinney, Dub Taylor, Sandra Deel, Don "Red" Barry, Charles H. Gray, Sam Peckinpah, Casey Tibbs	
A U G U S T	2	Kansas City Bomber	Metro-Goldwyn-Mayer / Artists Entertainment Complex / Levy-Gardner-Laven / Raquel Welch Inc.	Jerrold Freedman (director); Calvin Clements Sr., Thomas Rickman (screenplay); Raquel Welch, Kevin McCarthy, Helena Kallianiotes, Norman Alden, Jeanne Cooper, Martine Bartlett, William Gray Espy, Richard Lane, Russ Marin, Stephen Manley, Jodie Foster, Georgia Schmidt, Shelly Novack, Joan Darling, Bill McKinney, Katherine Pass, Cornelia Sharpe	
A U G U S T	3	The New Centurions	Columbia Pictures / Chartoff-Winkler Productions	Richard Fleischer (director); Stirling Silliphant (screenplay); George C. Scott, Stacy Keach, Jane Alexander, Scott Wilson, Rosalind Cash, Erik Estrada, Clifton James, James B. Sikking, Beverly Hope Atkinson, Mittie Lawrence, Isabel Sanford, Carol Speed, Burke Byrnes, William Atherton, Ed Lauter, Dolph Sweet, Stefan Gierasch, Michael Lane, Roger E. Mosley, Charles H. Gray, Read Morgan, Michael DeLano, Pepe Serna, Hilly Hicks, Lieux Dressler, Kitten Natividad, Gerald S. O'Loughlin, Anne Ramsey	
A U G U S T	4	Super Fly	Warner Bros. / Superfly Ltd.	Gordon Parks Jr. (director); Phillip Fenty (screenplay); Ron O'Neal, Carl Lee, Julius W. Harris, Sheila Frazier, Charles McGregor, Sig Shore, Curtis Mayfield, Master Henry Gibson, Polly Niles, Yvonne Delaine, K.C., Chris Arnett, E. Preston Reddick, Lucky Scott, Craig McMullen, Tyrone McCullough	
A U G U S T	6	Everything You Always Wanted to Know About Sex* (*But Were Afraid to Ask)	United Artists / Jack Rollins-Charles H. Joffe Productions / Brodsky/Gould Productions	Woody Allen (director/screenplay); Woody Allen, John Carradine, Lou Jacobi, Louise Lasser, Anthony Quayle, Tony Randall, Lynn Redgrave, Burt Reynolds, Gene Wilder, Jack Barry, Elaine Giftos, Toni Holt, Robert Q. Lewis, Heather MacRae, Pamela Mason, Sidney Miller, Regis Philbin, Titos Vandis, Stanley Adams, Oscar Beregi, Alan Caillou, Don Chuy, Dort Clark, Erin Fleming, Geoffrey Holder, Baruch Lumet, Tom Mack, Jay Robinson, Ref Sanchez, Robert Walden, H.E. West, Norman Alden, William Beckley, Al Silvani	
A U G U S T	9	Snoopy Come Home	National General Pictures / Cinema Center Films / Lee Mendelson/Bill Melendez Productions / Sopwith Productions	Bill Melendez (director); Charles M. Schulz (screenplay); Chad Webber, Robin Kohn, Stephen Shea, Hilary Momberger, Chris De Faria, Linda Mendelson, Bill Melendez, Shelby Flint, Thurl Ravenscroft, Ray Pohlman, Don Ralke, David Carey, Johanna Baer, Linda Ercoli, Guy Pohlman	
A U G U S T	16	Pope Joan	Columbia Pictures	Michael Anderson (director); John Briley (screenplay); Liv Ullmann, Olivia de Havilland, Lesley-Anne Down, Trevor Howard, Jeremy Kemp, Patrick Magee, Franco Nero, Maximilian Schell, Martin Benson, Terrence Hardiman, André Morell, Derek Farr, Richard Pearson, Margareta Pogonat, Richard Bebb, John Shrapnel, Peter Arne, George Innes, Nigel Havers, Kurt Christian, Phillip Ross, Duncan Lamont, Robert Beatty, John Abineri, Lyndon Brook, Keir Dullea, Harry Fielder, Fred Wood, Natasha Nicolescu, Sharon Winter	
A U G U S T	22	And Now for Something Completely Different	Columbia-Warner Distributors / Playboy Productions / Kettledrum Films / Lownes Productions / Python (Monty) Pictures	Ian MacNaughton, Terry Gilliam (directors); Monty Python (screenplay); Graham Chapman, John Cleese, Terry Gilliam, Eric Idle, Terry Jones, Michael Palin, Carol Cleveland, Connie Booth, Lewis Alexander, The Fred Tomlinson Singers, Lesley Judd, Fred Wood, Artur Axmann, Neville Chamberlain, Winston Churchill, Adolf Hitler, King George VI, Richard Nixon, Queen Elizabeth the 2nd	
A U G U S T	23	To Kill a Clown	20th Century Fox / Palomar Pictures	George Bloomfield (director/screenplay); I.C. Rapoport (screenplay); Alan Alda, Blythe Danner, Heath Lamberts, Eric Clavering	
A U G U S T	25	Blacula	American International Pictures / Power Productions	William Crain (director); Joan Torres, Raymond Koenig, Richard Glouner (screenplay); William Marshall, Denise Nicholas, Vonetta McGee, Gordon Pinsent, Thalmus Rasulala, Ketty Lester, Ji-Tu Cumbuka, Elisha Cook Jr., The Hues Corporation, Emily Yancy, Lance Taylor Sr., Logan Field, Ted Harris, Rick Metzler, Charles Macaulay, Eric Brotherson	
A U G U S T	30	The Last House on the Left	American International Pictures / Hallmark Releasing / Sean S. Cunningham Films / The Night Company / Lobster Enterprises	Wes Craven (director/screenplay); Sandra Peabody, David A. Hess, Fred Lincoln, Jeramie Rain, Martin Kove, Steve Miner, Lucy Grantham, Marc Sheffler, Cynthia Garr, Gaylord St. James, Marshall Anker, Ada Washington	
S E P T E M B E R	1	Bluebeard	Cinerama Releasing Corporation / Gloria Film S.r.l. / Barnabé Productions S.a.r.l. / Geiselgasteig Film GmbH	Edward Dmytryk (director/screenplay); Ennio De Concini, Maria Pia Fusco (screenplay); Richard Burton, Raquel Welch, Virna Lisi, Nathalie Delon, Marilù Tolo, Karin Schubert, Agostina Belli, Sybil Danning, Joey Heatherton, Jean Lefebvre, Karl-Otto Alberty, Kurt Großkurth, Sándor Szabó, Dennis Burgess, Mathieu Carrière, Edward Meeks, Doka Bukova, Erica Schramm, Thomas Fischer, Peter Martin Urtel, Mag-Avril	
S E P T E M B E R	9	Man of the East	United Artists / Produzioni Europee Associati (PEA) / Les Productions Artistes Associés	E.B. Clucher (director/screenplay); Terence Hill, Gregory Walcott, Yanti Somer, Harry Carey Jr., Enzo Fiermonte, Riccardo Pizzuti, Salvatore Borghese, Steffen Zacharias, Pupo De Luca, Zach Bell, Dominic Barto, Danika La Loggia, Jean Louis, Alessandro Sperli, Luigi Casellato, Tony Burton, Rigal Suzanne Leone, Kevin Richmond	
S E P T E M B E R	12	Slaughter	American International Pictures	Jack Starrett (director); Don Williams, Mark Hanna (screenplay); Jim Brown, Stella Stevens, Rip Torn, Don Gordon, Marlene Clark, Cameron Mitchell, Robert Phillips, Marion Brash, Roger Cudney, Norman Alfe, Eddie LoRusso, Buddy Garion, Lance Winston, Juan Jose Laboriel, Francisca Lopez de Laboriel	
S E P T E M B E R	13	The Ruling Class	Embassy Pictures	Peter Medak (director); Peter Barnes (screenplay); Peter O'Toole, Alastair Sim, Arthur Lowe, Harry Andrews, Coral Browne, Michael Bryant, Graham Crowden, Nigel Green, William Mervyn, Carolyn Seymour, James Villiers, Hugh Burden, Henry Woolf, Oliver McGreevy, Kay Walsh, Patsy Byrne, Cyril Appleton, Leslie Schofield, Joan Cooper, Declan Mulholland, James Grout, James Hazeldine, Ronald Adam, Llewellyn Rees, Kenneth Benda, Hugh Owens, Griffith Davies, Julian D'Albie	
S E P T E M B E R	15	The Discreet Charm of the Bourgeoisie	20th Century Fox	Luis Buñuel (director/screenplay); Jean-Claude Carrière (screenplay); Fernando Rey, Paul Frankeur, Delphine Seyrig, Bulle Ogier, Stéphane Audran, Jean-Pierre Cassel, Julien Bertheau, Milena Vukotic, Claude Piéplu, Muni, Michel Piccoli, Pierre Maguelon, François Maistre, Jacques Rispal, Amparo Soler Leal, Georges Douking, Maxence Mailfort, Bernard Musson, Maria Gabriella Maione, Christian Baltauss, Alix Mahieux	
S E P T E M B E R	21	Cancel My Reservation	Warner Bros.	Paul Bogart (director); Robert Fisher, Arthur Marx (screenplay); Bob Hope, Eva Marie Saint, Ralph Bellamy, Forrest Tucker, Anne Archer, Keenan Wynn, Henry Darrow, Chief Dan George, Doodles Weaver, Betty Ann Carr, Herb Vigran, Pat Morita, Gordon Oliver, Richard Yniguez, Paul Bogart, Johnny Carson, Bing Crosby, John Wayne, Flip Wilson	
S E P T E M B E R	22	Another Nice Mess	Fine Films	Bob Einstein (director/screenplay); Rich Little, Herb Voland, Bruce Kirby, Stewart Bradley, Stanley Adams, Magda Harout, Billy Sands, Bob Einstein, Art Lassiter, Norman Grabowski, Hal Smith, Michael Elias, Steve Martin, Kate Murtagh, Dick Enberg, Stan Laurel, Oliver Hardy, Adolf Hitler, Richard Nixon, Diahn Williams, Ivan Naranjo, Tiger Joe Marsh, John McDonald	
S E P T E M B E R	24	Sounder	20th Century Fox / Radnitz/Mattel Productions	Martin Ritt (director); Lonne Elder III (screenplay); Cicely Tyson, Paul Winfield, Kevin Hooks, Carmen Matthews, Taj Mahal, James Best, Janet MacLachlan, Jerry Leggio, Eric Hooks, Yvonne Jarrell, Sylvia "Kuumba" Williams, Ted Airhart, Richard Durham, Spencer Bradford, Judge William Thomas Bennett, Reverend Thomas N. Phillips	
S E P T E M B E R	26	Solaris	Mosfilm	Andrei Tarkovsky (director/screenplay); Fridrikh Gorenshtein (screenplay); Donatas Banionis, Natalya Bondarchuk, Jüri Järvet, Vladislav Dvorzhetsky, Nikolai Grinko, Olga Barnet, Anatoly Solonitsyn, Sos Sargsyan, Aleksandr Misharin, Yulian Semyonov, Bagrat Oganesyan, Tamara Ogorodnikova, Tatyana Malykh, Vitalik Kerdimun, Olga Kizilova, Georgiy Teykh, Raimundas Banionis	
S E P T E M B E R	28	Dracula A.D. 1972	Columbia-Warner Distributors / Hammer Film Productions	Alan Gibson (director); Don Houghton (screenplay); Peter Cushing, Christopher Lee, Stephanie Beacham, Christopher Neame, Marsha Hunt, Caroline Munro, Janet Key, Michael Kitchen, Lally Bowers, Flanagan, Stoneground, Michael Coles, Penny Brahms, William Ellis, Philip Miller, David Andrews, Constance Luttrell, Michael Daly, Artro Morris, Jo Richardson, Brian John Smith	

== October–December ==
Opening		Title	Production company	Cast and crew	Ref.
O C T O B E R	4	Hickey & Boggs	United Artists / Film Guarantors	Robert Culp (director); Walter Hill (screenplay); Bill Cosby, Robert Culp, Rosalind Cash, Isabel Sanford, Robert Mandan, Michael Moriarty, Jack Colvin, Vincent Gardenia, Ed Lauter, Joe E. Tata, James Woods, Dean Smith, Bernard Nedell, Bernie Schwartz, Bill Hickman, Roger E. Mosley, Ta-Ronce Allen, Lou Frizzell, Sheila Sullivan	
O C T O B E R	8	Bad Company	Paramount Pictures	Robert Benton (director/screenplay); David Newman (screenplay); Jeff Bridges, Barry Brown, Jim Davis, David Huddleston, John Savage, Jerry Houser, Geoffrey Lewis, Raymond Guth, Ed Lauter, John Quade, Charles Tyner, Ted Gehring, Damon Cofer, Joshua Hill Lewis, Jean Allison, Ned Wertimer, Claudia Bryar, John Boyd	
O C T O B E R	11	Dumbo (re-release)	Walt Disney Productions / Buena Vista Distribution	Ben Sharpsteen, Norman Ferguson, Wilfred Jackson, Bill Roberts, Jack Kinney, Samuel Armstrong (directors); Joe Grant, Dick Huemer (screenplay); Edward Brophy, Verna Felton, Cliff Edwards, Herman Bing, Sterling Holloway, The Hall Johnson Choir, Billy Bletcher, Margaret Wright, The King's Men, Noreen Gammill, Dorothy Scott, Sarah Selby, Malcolm Hutton, John McLeish	
O C T O B E R	12	The King of Marvin Gardens	Columbia Pictures / BBS Productions	Bob Rafelson (director); Jacob Brackman (screenplay); Jack Nicholson, Bruce Dern, Ellen Burstyn, Scatman Crothers, John Ryan, Sully Boyar, Josh Mostel, Tony King, Jerry Fujikawa, Conrad Yama, Julia Anne Robinson, Charles LaVine, Arnold Williams, William Pabst	
O C T O B E R	14	Last Tango in Paris	United Artists / Produzioni Europee Associati (PEA) / Les Productions Artistes Associés	Bernando Bertolucci (director/screenplay); Franco Arcalli, Agnès Varda (screenplay); Marlon Brando, Maria Schneider, Maria Michi, Giovanna Galletti, Jean-Pierre Léaud, Massimo Girotti, Catherine Allégret, Catherine Breillat, Darling Légitimus, Veronica Lazăr, Gitt Magrini, Luce Marquand, Dan Diament, Catherine Sola, Mauro Marchetti, Peter Schommer, Marie-Hélène Breillat, Armand Abplanalp, Rachel Kesterber, Ramón Mendizábal, Mimi Pinson, Gérard Lepennec, Stéphane Koziak	
O C T O B E R	18	Run, Cougar, Run	Walt Disney Productions / Buena Vista Distribution	Jerome Courtland (director); Louis Pelletier (screenplay); Stuart Whitman, Frank Aletter, Lonny Chapman, Douglas Fowley, Harry Carey Jr., Alfonso Arau	
O C T O B E R	19	Play It as It Lays	Universal Pictures / F.P. Productions	Frank Perry (director); Joan Didion, John Gregory Dunne (screenplay); Tuesday Weld, Anthony Perkins, Tammy Grimes, Adam Roarke, Ruth Ford, Eddie Firestone, Diana Ewing, Paul Lambert, Chuck McCann, Severn Darden, Tony Young, Richard Anderson, Mitzi Hoag, Tyne Daly, Roger Ewing, John P. Finnegan, Darlene Conley, Arthur Knight, Elizabeth Claman, Jennifer C. Lesko, Richard Ryal, Tracy Morgan, Albert Johnson, Allan Warnick	
O C T O B E R	19	When the Legends Die	20th Century Fox	Stuart Millar (director); Robert Dozier (screenplay); Richard Widmark, Frederic Forrest, Luana Anders, Vito Scotti, John War Eagle, Garry Walberg, Jack Mullaney, Roy Engel, Rex Holman, Herbert Nelson, John Gruber, Malcolm Curley, Mel Gallagher, Tillman Box, Sondra Pratt	
O C T O B E R	21	Lady Sings the Blues	Paramount Pictures / Motown Productions	Sidney J. Furie (director); Suzanne de Passe, Chris Clark, Terence McCloy (screenplay); Diana Ross, Billy Dee Williams, Richard Pryor, James T. Callahan, Paul Hampton, Sid Melton, Virginia Capers, Yvonne Fair, Isabel Sanford, Jester Hairston, Lynn Hamilton, Robert Gordy, Paulene Myers, Scatman Crothers, Ned Glass, Milton Selzer, Norman Bartold, Clay Tanner, Bert Kramer, George Wyner, Larry Duran, Darlene Conley, Jayne Kennedy, Victor Morosco, Harry Caesar	
O C T O B E R	31	Pancho Villa	Scotia International Film Distributors / Granada Films	Eugenio Martín (director); Julian Halevy (screenplay); Telly Savalas, Clint Walker, Chuck Connors, Anne Francis, José María Prada, Ángel del Pozo, Antonio Casas, Alberto Dalbés, Luis Dávila, Mónica Randall, Walter Coy	
N O V E M B E R	1	Daughters of Satan	United Artists / A & S Productions	Hollingsworth Morse (director); John C. Higgins (screenplay); Tom Selleck, Barra Grant, Tani Guthrie, Paraluman, Vic Silayan, Vic Díaz, Gina Laforteza, Ben Rubio, Paquito Salcedo, Chito Reyes, Bobby Greenwood	
N O V E M B E R	1	Dirty Little Billy	Columbia Pictures / WRG/Dragoti Productions Ltd.	Stan Dragoti (director/screenplay); Charles Moss (screenplay); Michael J. Pollard, Richard Evans, Lee Purcell, Charles Aidman, Willard Sage, Mills Watson, Ronny Graham, Josip Elic, Richard Stahl, Gary Busey, Dick Van Patten, Frank Welker, Severn Darden, Len Lesser, Ed Lauter, Nick Nolte, Dran Hamilton, Alex Wilson, Scott Walker, Rosary Nix, Craig Bovia, Henry Proach	
N O V E M B E R	1	Trouble Man	20th Century Fox	Ivan Dixon (director); John D.F. Black (screenplay); Robert Hooks, Paul Winfield, Ralph Waite, William Smithers, Paula Kelly, Julius Harris, Bill Henderson, Vince Howard, Stack Pierce, Nathaniel Taylor, Lawrence Cook, Virginia Capers, Gordon Jump, Jean Bell, Wayne Storm, Akili Jones, Rick Ferrell, James "Texas Blood" Brown	
N O V E M B E R	15	Ulzana's Raid	Universal Pictures / De Haven Productions / The Associates & Aldrich Company	Robert Aldrich (director); Alan Sharp (screenplay); Burt Lancaster, Bruce Davison, Richard Jaeckel, Joaquín Martínez, Lloyd Bochner, Karl Swenson, Douglass Watson, John Pearce, Richard Bull, George Aguilar, Dean Smith, Jorge Luke, Dran Hamilton, Gladys Holland, Margaret Fairchild, Aimee Eccles, Otto Reichow	
N O V E M B E R	17	1776	Columbia Pictures	Peter H. Hunt (director); Peter Stone (screenplay); William Daniels, Howard Da Silva, Ken Howard, Donald Madden, Blythe Danner, John Cullum, David Ford, Virginia Vestoff, Ron Holgate, Emory Bass, Howard Caine, John Myhers, Rex Robbins, William Hansen, Ray Middleton, James Noble, Patrick Hines, Ralston Hill, William Duell, William Bassett, Nicolas Coster, Jack De Mave, Peter Forster, John Holland, Jonathan Moore, Roy Poole, Leo Leyden, Charles Rule, Daniel Keyes, Stephen Nathan	
N O V E M B E R	17	Asylum	Cinema International Corporation / Amicus Productions / Harbor Productions	Roy Ward Baker (director); Robert Bloch (screenplay); Peter Cushing, Britt Ekland, Robert Powell, Herbert Lom, Barry Morse, Patrick Magee, Geoffrey Bayldon, Barbara Parkins, Sylvia Syms, Richard Todd, Ann Firbank, John Franklyn-Robbins, Charlotte Rampling, James Villiers, Megs Jenkins, Frank Forsyth	
N O V E M B E R	17	The Mechanic	United Artists	Michael Winner (director); Lewis John Carlino (screenplay); Charles Bronson, Jan-Michael Vincent, Keenan Wynn, Jill Ireland, Linda Ridgeway, Frank de Kova, Lindsay Crosby, Takayuki Kubota, Patrick O'Moore, Enzo Fiermonte, Celeste Yarnall, Steve Vinovich, Robert Jaffe, Ernie Orsatti	
N O V E M B E R	18	Sisters (Filmex, Los Angeles)	American International Pictures / Edward R. Pressman Film Corporation	Brian De Palma (director/screenplay); Louisa Rose (screenplay); Margot Kidder, Jennifer Salt, Charles Durning, Bill Finley, Lisle Wilson, Barnard Hughes, Dolph Sweet, Olympia Dukakis, Justine Johnston, Mary Davenport, Catherine Gaffigan	
N O V E M B E R	20	Alice's Adventures in Wonderland	Fox-Rank Distributors / Josef Shaftel Productions	William Sterling (director/screenplay); Fiona Fullerton, Hywel Bennett, Michael Crawford, Robert Helpmann, Michael Hordern, Michael Jayston, Davy Kaye, Roy Kinnear, Spike Milligan, Dudley Moore, Dennis Price, Ralph Richardson, Flora Robson, Peter Sellers, Rodney Bewes, Ray Brooks, Richard Warwick, Dennis Waterman, Julian Chagrin, Peter Bull, Patsy Rowlands, Freddie Cox, Frank Cox, Ian Trigger, Stanley Bates, Freddie Earlie, William Ellis, Mike Elles, Peter O'Farrell, Victoria Shallard, Pippa Vickers, Ray Edwards, Melita Manger, Angela Morgan, June Kidd, Michael Reardon, Brian Tipping	
N O V E M B E R	20	Black Gunn	Columbia Pictures / Champion Production Company / World Arts Media / World Film Services	Robert Hartford-Davis (director); Franklin Coen, Robert Shearer (screenplay); Jim Brown, Martin Landau, Brenda Sykes, Herbert Jefferson Jr., Luciana Paluzzi, Vida Blue, Stephen McNally, Keefe Brasselle, Timothy Brown, William Campbell, Bruce Glover, Bernie Casey, Gary Conway, Chuck Daniel, Rick Ferrell, Gene Washington, Julian Christopher, Tony Young, Katherine Woodville, Jeannie Bell, Tony Giorgio, Tommy Davis, Toni Holt Kramer, Mark Tapscott, Don Borisenko, Gyl Roland, Lavelle Roby, Frank Bello	
N O V E M B E R	22	Rage	Warner Bros.	George C. Scott (director); Philip Friedman, Dan Kleinman (screenplay); George C. Scott, Richard Basehart, Martin Sheen, Barnard Hughes, Paul Stevens, Stephen Young, Kenneth Tobey, Robert Walden, William Jordan, Dabbs Greer, John Dierkes, Bette Henritze, Lou Frizzell, Ed Lauter, Terry Wilson, Nicolas Beauvy, Fielding Greaves	
N O V E M B E R	22	They Only Kill Their Masters	Metro-Goldwyn-Mayer	James Goldstone (director); Lane Slate (screenplay); James Garner, Katharine Ross, Hal Holbrook, Harry Guardino, June Allyson, Tom Ewell, Peter Lawford, Edmond O'Brien, Arthur O'Connell, Ann Rutherford, Art Metrano, Christopher Connelly, Jason Wingreen, Robert Nichols, Norma Connolly, Royce D. Applegate, Alma Beltran, Chuck Courtney, John Davey, Larry Duran, Kim Kahana, Harry Masch, Jenifer Shaw, David Westberg, Lee Pulford	
D E C E M B E R	2	Brother Sun, Sister Moon	Paramount Pictures	Franco Zeffirelli (director/screenplay); Suso Cecchi d'Amico, Lina Wertmüller, Kenneth Ross (screenplay); Graham Faulkner, Judi Bowker, Leigh Lawson, Kenneth Cranham, Lee Montague, Valentina Cortese, Alec Guinness, Michael Feast, John Sharp, Adolfo Celi, Sandro Dori, Robin Askwith, Fortunato Arena, Carlo Hinterman, Nerina Montagnani, Carlo Pisacane, Carleton Hobbs, Massimo Foschi, John Karlsen, Marne Maitland, Robert Rietti, Nicholas Willatt, Francesco Guerrieri, Aristide Caporale, Alfredo Bianchini, Renato Terra Caizzi	
D E C E M B E R	3	Horror Express (U.K.)	Scotia International / Granada Films / Benmar Productions	Eugenio Martín (director); Arnaud d'Usseau, Julian Halevy (screenplay); Christopher Lee, Peter Cushing, Alberto de Mendoza, Silvia Tortosa, Julio Peña, Telly Savalas, George Rigaud, Helga Liné, Alice Reinheart, Ángel del Pozo, José Jaspe, Víctor Israel, Barta Barri, José Canalejas, Robert Rietti, Roger Delgado, Faith Clift, Juan Olaguivel, Hiroshi Kitatawa, Vicente Roca, José Marco, Allen Russell	
D E C E M B E R	8	Sleuth (U.K.)	20th Century Fox / Palomar Pictures International	Joseph L. Mankiewicz (director); Anthony Shaffer (screenplay); Laurence Olivier, Michael Caine, Alec Cawthorne, John Matthews, Eve Channing, Teddy Martin	
D E C E M B E R	12	Child's Play	Paramount Pictures	Sidney Lumet (director); Leon Prochnik (screenplay); James Mason, Robert Preston, Beau Bridges, David Rounds, Kate Harrington, Tom Leopold, Christopher Man, Paul O'Keefe, Ron Weyand, Charles White, Brian Chapin, Bryant Fraser	
D E C E M B E R	12	Man of La Mancha	United Artists / Produzioni Europee Associati (PEA)	Arthur Hiller (director); Dale Wasserman (screenplay); Peter O'Toole, Sophia Loren, James Coco, Harry Andrews, John Castle, Ian Richardson, Brian Blessed, Julie Gregg, Rosalie Crutchley, Gino Conforti, Marne Maitland, Dorothy Sinclair, Miriam Acevedo	
D E C E M B E R	12	The Poseidon Adventure	20th Century Fox / Kent Productions, Ltd.	Ronald Neame (director); Stirling Silliphant, Wendell Mayes (screenplay); Gene Hackman, Ernest Borgnine, Red Buttons, Carol Lynley, Roddy McDowall, Stella Stevens, Shelley Winters, Jack Albertson, Pamela Sue Martin, Arthur O'Connell, Eric Shea, Leslie Nielsen, Fred Sadoff, Sheila Mathews, John Crawford, Bob Hastings, Charles Bateman, Dick Durock, Maurice Marsac, Ernie Orsatti, David Sharpe, Tucker Smith, Paul Stader, Tom Steele, Waddy Wachtel, Byron Webster, Jan Arvan, Erik Nelson, Bobby Porter	
D E C E M B E R	13	The Getaway	National General Pictures / First Artists / Solar Productions / David Foster Productions / Tatiana Films	Sam Peckinpah (director); Walter Hill (screenplay); Steve McQueen, Ali MacGraw, Ben Johnson, Al Lettieri, Sally Struthers, Slim Pickens, Richard Bright, Jack Dodson, Dub Taylor, Bo Hopkins, Roy Jenson, Dick Crockett, Hal Smith, John Bryson, Bill Hart, Tom Runyon	
D E C E M B E R	17	Avanti!	United Artists / Phalanx Productions / Jalem Productions / The Mirisch Corporation / Produzioni Europee Associati	Billy Wilder (director/screenplay); I.A.L. Diamond (screenplay); Jack Lemmon, Juliet Mills, Clive Revill, Edward Andrews, Gianfranco Barra, Franco Angrisano, Pippo Franco, Giacomo Rizzo, Antonino Faà di Bruno, Yanti Somer, Janet Agren, Ty Hardin, Sergio Bruni, Franco Acampora, Giselda Castrini, Raffaele Mottola, Harry Ray	
D E C E M B E R	17	The Heartbreak Kid	20th Century Fox / Palomar Pictures	Elaine May (director); Neil Simon (screenplay); Charles Grodin, Cybill Shepherd, Jeannie Berlin, Audra Lindley, Eddie Albert, William Prince, Augusta Dabney, Doris Roberts, Erik Lee Preminger, Art Metrano, Marianne Muellerleile, Neil Simon, Mitchell Jason, Marilyn Putnam, Jack Hausman, Tim Browne, Jean Scoppa, Greg Scherick	
D E C E M B E R	17	Pete 'n' Tillie	Universal Pictures	Martin Ritt (director); Julius J. Epstein (screenplay); Walter Matthau, Carol Burnett, Geraldine Page, Barry Nelson, René Auberjonois, Lee Harcourt Montgomery, Henry Jones, Kent Smith, Philip Bourneuf, Whit Bissell, Timothy Blake, Don Diamond, Angela Greene, Roberta Haynes, Kathleen Hughes, Robert Nichols, Isabel Sanford, Anne Whitfield	
D E C E M B E R	17	Travels with My Aunt	Metro-Goldwyn-Mayer	George Cukor (director); Jay Presson Allen, Hugh Wheeler (screenplay); Maggie Smith, Alec McCowen, Louis Gossett Jr., Robert Stephens, Cindy Williams, Robert Flemyng, José Luis López Vázquez, Raymond Gérôme, Daniel Emilfork, Corinne Marchand, John Hamill, David Swift, Bernard Holley, Valerie White, Antonio Pica, Jesús Guzmán, William Layton, Julio Peña, Aldo Sambrell, Patricia Wright	
D E C E M B E R	17	Daigoro vs. Goliath (Japan)	Toho / Tsuburaya Productions	Toshihiro Iijima (director); Kitao Senzoku (screenplay); Hiroshi Inuzuka, Akiji Kobayashi, Shinsuke Minami, Kazuya Kosaka, Hachiro Misumi	
D E C E M B E R	18	Images	Columbia Pictures	Robert Altman (director/screenplay); Susannah York (screenplay); Susannah York, René Auberjonois, Marcel Bozzuffi, Hugh Millais, Cathryn Harrison, Barbara Baxley, John Morley	
D E C E M B E R	18	The Life and Times of Judge Roy Bean	National General Pictures / First Artists	John Huston (director); John Milius (screenplay); Paul Newman, Jacqueline Bisset, Tab Hunter, John Huston, Stacy Keach, Roddy McDowall, Anthony Perkins, Anthony Zerbe, Ava Gardner, Victoria Principal, Ned Beatty, Matt Clark, Billy Pearson, Bill McKinney, Steve Kanaly, Michael Sarrazin, David Sharpe, Jack Colvin, Dick Farnsworth, Roy Jenson, Fred Krone, Dean Smith, Howard Morton, Don Starr, Stan Barrett, Jeannie Epper, Bruno, Jim Burk, Mark Headley	
D E C E M B E R	19	Across 110th Street	United Artists / Film Guarantors	Barry Shear (director); Luther Davis (screenplay); Anthony Quinn, Yaphet Kotto, Anthony Franciosa, Paul Benjamin, Ed Bernard, Richard Ward, Antonio Fargas, Norma Donaldson, Gilbert Lewis, Marlene Warfield, Nat Polen, Tim O'Connor, Gloria Hendry, Burt Young, Charles McGregor, Paul Harris, Robert Sacchi, Ric Mancini, Dick Crockett, George DiCenzo, Steve Gravers, Mel Winkler, Janet Sarno, Arnold Williams, Frank Macetta	
D E C E M B E R	20	The Effect of Gamma Rays on Man-in-the-Moon Marigolds	20th Century Fox	Paul Newman (director); Alvin Sargent (screenplay); Joanne Woodward, Nell Potts, Judith Lowry, David Spielberg, Richard Venture, Will Hare, Jess Osuna, Roberta Wallach, Carolyn Coates, Estelle Omens, Ellen Dano, Lynne Rogers, Roger Serbagi, John Lehne, Michael Kearney, Dee Victor	
D E C E M B E R	20	Hit Man	Metro-Goldwyn-Mayer / Penelope Productions	George Armitage (director/screenplay); Bernie Casey, Pam Grier, Don Diamond, Edmund Cambridge, Rudy Challenger, Tracy Ann-King, Roger E. Mosley, John Lupton, Carmen Argenziano, Timothy Brown, Paul Gleason, Lisa Moore, Bhetty Waldron, Sam Laws, Candy All, Bob Harris, Christopher Joy	
D E C E M B E R	21	Jeremiah Johnson	Warner Bros. / Sanford Productions (III)	Sydney Pollack (director); Edward Anhalt, John Milius (screenplay); Robert Redford, Will Geer, Stefan Gierasch, Delle Bolton, Josh Albee, Joaquín Martínez, Allyn Ann McLerie, Paul Benedict, Jack Colvin, Matt Clark, Richard Angarola, Charles Tyner, Tanya Tucker	
D E C E M B E R	22	Snowball Express	Walt Disney Productions / Buena Vista Distribution	Norman Tokar (director); Don Tait, Jim Parker, Arnold Margolin (screenplay); Dean Jones, Nancy Olson, Harry Morgan, Keenan Wynn, Johnny Whitaker, Michael McGreevey, George Lindsey, Kathleen Cody, Mary Wickes, David White, Dick Van Patten, Alice Backes, Joanna Phillips, John Myhers	
D E C E M B E R	22	The Sword in the Stone (re-release)	Walt Disney Productions / Buena Vista Distribution	Wolfgang Reitherman (director); Bill Peet (screenplay); Rickie Sorensen, Karl Swenson, Junius Matthews, Sebastian Cabot, Norman Alden, Martha Wentworth, Alan Napier, Thurl Ravenscroft, James MacDonald, Ginny Tyler, Barbara Jo Allen, Tudor Owen, Richard Reitherman, Robert Reitherman	
D E C E M B E R	30	Way of the Dragon	Golden Harvest / Concord Production Inc.	Bruce Lee (director/screenplay); Bruce Lee, Nora Miao, Paul Wei, Huang Chung-hsin, Tony Liu, Unicorn Chan, Chuck Norris, Malisa Longo, Robert Wall, Hwang In-shik, Jon T. Benn, Anders Nelsson, Andre E. Morgan, John Derbyshire, Tommy Chen, Chin Ti, Wu Ngan, Robert Chan	

== See also ==
- List of 1972 box office number-one films in the United States
- 1972 in film
- 1972 in the United States
