= Stewart Bradley =

Stewart Bradley may refer to:

- Stewart Bradley (actor) (1924–1995), American actor
- Stewart Bradley (American football) (born 1983), American football linebacker
