= Stephen Lodge =

Stephen Lodge may refer to:

- Stephen Lodge (screenwriter) (1943–2017), American screenwriter and actor
- Stephen Lodge (referee) (born 1952), retired English football official
