= Fred Wood (actor) =

English actor

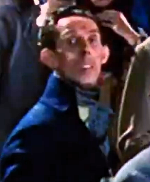
- Wood in The Curse of the Werewolf (1961)
- Born: 26 October 1922; Rotherhithe, London, England
- Died: January 2003 (aged 80)
- Occupation: Actor
- Years active: 1942–2001

Fred Wood (born 26 October 1922, Rotherhithe, London), died January 2003) was an English actor.

Wood was best known for roles in Star Wars (1977), Elephant Man (1980) and From Russia with Love (1963). Wood has appeared in a large number of American films, due to filming taking place partly or entirely in Britain. As a British-based actor and supporting artist, he worked extensively in British films since the early 1940s until 2001 and television since the 1950s.

He appeared in a wide range of television shows including Dangerman, Gideon's Way, The Professionals, The Baron and Gone to Seed[18/12/92] (1992) .

== Selected filmography ==
- Gaiety George (1946) – Tommy returning home from war (uncredited)
- Piccadilly Incident (1946) – Sailor (uncredited)
- The Root of All Evil (1947) – Celebratory Crowd Member (uncredited)
- Fame Is the Spur (1946) – Welsh Miner (uncredited)
- Master of Bankdam (1947) – Striker in Crowd (Far Left) (uncredited)
- Adam and Evalyn (1949) – Race Spectator – In Crowd (uncredited)
- Beau Brummell (1954) – Audience Member at political rally – far left (uncredited)
- Yangtse Incident: The Story of H.M.S. Amethyst (1957) – Unconscious Seaman (uncredited)
- The Curse of Frankenstein (1957) – Pallbearer (uncredited)
- A Night to Remember (1958) – Drowning Passenger (uncredited)
- The Mouse That Roared (1959) – Bird Seller (uncredited)
- Gorgo (1961) – Circus Guard (uncredited)
- Konga (1961) – Man in Crowd (uncredited)
- The Snake Woman (1961) – Villager (Carrying Victim from the Pub) (uncredited)
- The Curse of the Werewolf (1961) – Angry Villager (Bottom Left) in Assembled Mob (uncredited)
- On the Fiddle (1961) – R.A.F. Pillot (uncredited)
- What a Whopper (1961) – Observer at loch (uncredited)
- The Prince and the Pauper (1962) – Commoner in Alley (uncredited)
- Village of Daughters (1962) – Villager in Crowd (uncredited)
- A Kind of Loving (1962) – Pub Patron (uncredited)
- Crooks Anonymous (1962) – Wedding Guest (uncredited)
- Two and Two Make Six (1962) – Racegoer (uncredited)
- Captain Clegg (1962) – Parishioner (uncredited)
- The Phantom of the Opera (1962) – Stagehand (uncredited)
- I Thank a Fool (1962) – Marquee Observer (uncredited)
- The Day of the Triffids (1962) – Train Passenger (uncredited)
- The Girl on the Boat (1962) – Porter (Boat Arrivals Southampton) (uncredited)
- Band of Thieves (1962) – Prisoner (In opening credits) (uncredited)
- Billy Budd (1962) – Crewman HMS Avenger (uncredited)
- The Dock Brief (1962) – Wedding Guest (uncredited)
- The L-Shaped Room (1962) – Man in Cafe (uncredited)
- I Could Go On Singing (1963) – Man in Theatre Audience (uncredited)
- The Small World of Sammy Lee (1963) – Strip joint patron (uncredited)
- The Mouse on the Moon (1963) – Bird Seller (uncredited)
- Heavens Above! (1963) – Protester (uncredited)
- The List of Adrian Messenger (1963) – Man in Bar (uncredited)
- Tom Jones (1963) – Man on Street Wearing Three-Cornered Hat (uncredited)
- Siege of the Saxons (1963) – Nobleman at Camelot (uncredited)
- Kiss of the Vampire (1963) – Gravedigger (uncredited)
- From Russia with Love (1963) – Gypsy (uncredited)
- The Man Who Finally Died (1963) – Exhumation Worker (uncredited)
- Father Came Too! (1964) – Man at Auction (uncredited)
- Hide and Seek (1964) – Pedestrian in Conversation (On Right) (uncredited)
- Becket (1964) – Congregation Member (at Bishops Service) (uncredited)
- The Evil of Frankenstein (1964) – Karlstaad Pedestrian (uncredited)
- The Masque of the Red Death (1964) – Prisoner (uncredited)
- A Hard Day's Night (1964) – Pub Patron (Animated Drinker Behind Ringo) (uncredited)
- The Tomb of Ligeia (1964) – Wedding Guest (uncredited)
- Operation Crossbow (1965) – Mess Steward (On the Right) (uncredited)
- Joey Boy (1965) – Soldier at Attention (Outside Joey's Bar) (uncredited)
- I've Gotta Horse (1965) – Race Spectator (at Derby) (uncredited)
- The Secret of Blood Island (1965) – POW Wielding Spade (uncredited)
- Three Hats for Lisa (1965) – Workman (in Truck) (uncredited)
- Rotten to the Core (1965) – Railway Worker (uncredited)
- A Study in Terror (1965) – Bearded Beggar (uncredited)
- The Heroes of Telemark (1965) – Saboteur (uncredited)
- Carry On Cowboy (1965) – Townsman (uncredited)
- The Liquidator (1965) – Commuter on Platform (uncredited)
- Up Jumped a Swagman (1965) – Railway Ticket Collector (uncredited)
- Strangler's Web (1965) – Lone Pedestrian (uncredited)
- The Plague of the Zombies (1966) – Lone Villager (on steps) (uncredited)
- Dracula: Prince of Darkness (1966) – Mourner (uncredited)
- Circus of Fear (1966) – Circus Roadie (Centre) (uncredited)
- Daleks' Invasion Earth 2150 A.D. (1966) – Running Man (uncredited)
- Press for Time (1966) – Beauty Pageant Observer (Unimpressed at Rear) (uncredited)
- A Man for All Seasons (1966) – Man in Court (uncredited)
- Blowup (1966) – Homeless Man (uncredited)
- Mister Ten Per Cent (1967) – Audience Member (uncredited)
- Eye of the Devil (1967) – Church Parishioner (far right) (uncredited)
- Stranger in the House (1967) – Protester Against Execution (uncredited)
- Herostratus (1967) – Patient on Bed (uncredited)
- Theatre of Death (1967) – Audience Member (Far Right) (uncredited)
- A Challenge for Robin Hood (1967) – Peasant (uncredited)
- Robbery (1967) – Hammer's Supporter (uncredited)
- Berserk! (1967) – Circus Audience (uncredited)
- I'll Never Forget What's'isname (1967) – Undertaker in Dream Sequence (uncredited)
- The Anniversary (1968) – Construction Worker with Cap (uncredited)
- Charlie Bubbles (1968) – Customers in the Pub (uncredited)
- The Vengeance of She (1968) – Cultist (uncredited)
- Salt and Pepper (1968) – Pedestrian in conversation (uncredited)
- Oliver! (1968) – Onlooker in Crowd (Below Viaduct) (uncredited)
- Till Death Us Do Part (1968) – Neighbour (uncredited)
- Curse of the Crimson Altar (1968) – Acolyte (uncredited)
- All Neat in Black Stockings (1969) – Pub Customer (Far Right) (uncredited)
- Battle of Britain (1969) – Rescue Worker (uncredited)
- Anne of the Thousand Days (1969) – Court Scribe (uncredited)
- One More Time (1970) – Undertaker (uncredited)
- The Mind of Mr. Soames (1970) – Pub Patron (Reading Paper)
- Cromwell (1970) – Peasant (in church) (uncredited)
- Cry of the Banshee (1970) – Pall Bearer (uncredited)
- Scrooge (1970) – Human billboard (uncredited)
- The Rise and Rise of Michael Rimmer (1970) – Protester (uncredited)
- Lust for a Vampire (1971) – Villager (uncredited)
- The Raging Moon (1971) – Convalescence Home Resident (uncredited)
- A Lizard in a Woman's Skin (1971) – Train Passenger (uncredited)
- Dad's Army (1971) – Townsman (uncredited)
- Quest for Love (1971) – Unhelpful neighbour (uncredited)
- And Now for Something Completely Different (1971) – Beggar (uncredited)
- Twins of Evil (1971) – Puritan (uncredited)
- I, Monster (1971) – Pipe Smoker (with cap) in pub. (uncredited)
- Gumshoe (1971) – Tube Passenger (uncredited)
- Carry on at Your Convenience (1971) – Strike-Breaker (uncredited)
- Steptoe & Son (1972) – Strip Club Patron (uncredited)
- Up the Chastity Belt (1972) – Peasant (uncredited)
- Burke & Hare (1972) – Gent at Market Stall (in Top Hat) (uncredited)
- Tales from the Crypt (1972) – Second Mortician (uncredited)
- Doomwatch (1972) – Villager (uncredited)
- Frenzy (1972) – Pub Patron (uncredited)
- The Ruling Class (1972) – Corpse (uncredited)
- The Pied Piper (1972) – Burger (uncredited)
- The Alf Garnett Saga (1972) – Pub Patron (uncredited)
- Pope Joan (1972) – Villager in Crowd (at outdoor Sermon) (uncredited)
- Demons of the Mind (1972) – Villager Carrying Torch (uncredited)
- The Amazing Mr. Blunden (1972) – Procurer (uncredited)
- The Offence (1973) – Man Accosted at night (uncredited)
- The Creeping Flesh (1973) – Inmate (uncredited)
- O Lucky Man! (1973) – Tramp (uncredited)
- Steptoe and Son Ride Again (1973) – Mourner (uncredited)
- The MacKintosh Man (1973) – Prisoner Working in Laundry (uncredited)
- Love Thy Neighbour (1973) – Unneighbourly Neighbour (uncredited)
- Carry on Girls (1973) – Audience Member (uncredited)
- The Wicker Man (1973) – Parishioner (Singing Hymn in Church) (uncredited)
- Digby, the Biggest Dog in the World (1973) – Observer with Jim Dale (uncredited)
- The Mutations (1974) – Audience Member (at Freak Show). (uncredited)
- Hennessy (1975) – McGinn – IRA terrorist (uncredited)
- The Adventure of Sherlock Holmes' Smarter Brother (1975) – Stage Roadie (uncredited)
- Voyage of the Damned (1976) – Passenger – MS St Louis (uncredited)
- Jabberwocky (1977) – Bandit (uncredited)
- Star Wars (1977) – Cantina Patron (uncredited)
- Breaking Glass (1980) – Window Shopper (uncredited)
- Elephant Man (1980) – Injured Man (uncredited)
- Superman II (1980) – Inmate (Working in prison Laundry) (uncredited)
- The Monster Club (1981) – Angry Villager (uncredited)
- Clash of the Titans (1981) – Slave (of Calibos) (uncredited)
- History of the World, Part I (1981) – Revolutionary Peasant (uncredited)
- Dragonslayer (1981) – Villager (uncredited)
- Lady Chatterley's Lover (1981) – Miner (uncredited)
- Time Bandits (1981) – One of the Poor (uncredited)
- Britannia Hospital (1982) – Hospital Casualty – On Trolley (uncredited)
- Gandhi (1982) – Man in the Crowd (uncredited)
- Monty Python's The Meaning of Life (1983) – Branded Man in Dungeon Room (uncredited)
- Superman III (1983) – Dole Recipient – Next to Gus Gorman (uncredited)
- Lassiter (1984) – Fight Spectator (uncredited)
- Champions (1984) – Shaun Patient (behind Bob Champion) (uncredited)
- 1984 (1984) – Prol (uncredited)
- Brazil (1985) – Giant Man with Bottle (uncredited)
- Morons from Outer Space (1985) – Naked Protester (uncredited)
- Santa Claus: The Movie (1985) – Ancient Elf (uncredited)
- Young Sherlock Holmes (1985) – Patron (Lower Nile Tavern) (uncredited)
- Car Trouble (1986) – Man Sheltering from Rain (uncredited)
- Withnail and I (1987) – Man In Cafe (uncredited)
- Willow (1988) – Druid (uncredited)
- Batman (1989) – Parade Spectator (uncredited)
- Henry V (1989) – Soldier (Hooded with Staff) (uncredited)
- The Krays (1990) – Fight Spectator (uncredited)
- Chicago Joe and the Showgirl (1990) – Cleaner in Arcade (uncredited)
- Robin Hood: Prince of Thieves (1991) – Running Villager (uncredited)
- The Hour of the Pig (1993) – Torch bearer at Feast (uncredited)
- Judge Dredd (1995) – Rioter (uncredited)
- Feast of July (1995) – Elderly Pedestrian (uncredited)
- The Secret Agent (1996) – Man Jostled in Alley ( by 'The Professor') (uncredited)
- The Fifth Element (1997) – Emissary (uncredited)
- Tom & Thomas (2002) – Passerby on London South Bank (Filmed 2001 final film role)
