= Altovise Davis =

American entertainer (1943–2009)

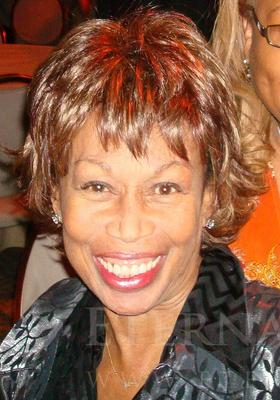
- Davis in 2007
- Born: Altovise Joanne Gore; August 30, 1943; Charlotte, North Carolina, U.S.
- Died: March 14, 2009 (aged 65); Los Angeles, California, U.S.
- Occupations: Entertainer, dancer
- Spouse: Sammy Davis Jr. (m. 1970; died 1990)

Altovise Joanne Davis (August 30, 1943 – March 14, 2009) was an American entertainer, best known for being Sammy Davis Jr.'s third wife.

== Early life ==
Altovise Joanne Gore was born in Charlotte, North Carolina and raised in Brooklyn, New York.

== Career ==
A life member of The Actors Studio, Gore worked during the 1960s as a chorus-line dancer in various musical shows both in London and on Broadway.

In the 1970s and 1980s, she made a few guest appearances in major TV series such as Charlie's Angels and CHiPs and minor roles in films such as Welcome to Arrow Beach (1974), Kingdom of the Spiders (1977), Boardwalk (1979), and Can't Stop the Music (1980).

Both she and her husband, Sammy Davis Jr., were frequent panelists on the 1970s television game show Tattletales.

== Personal life ==
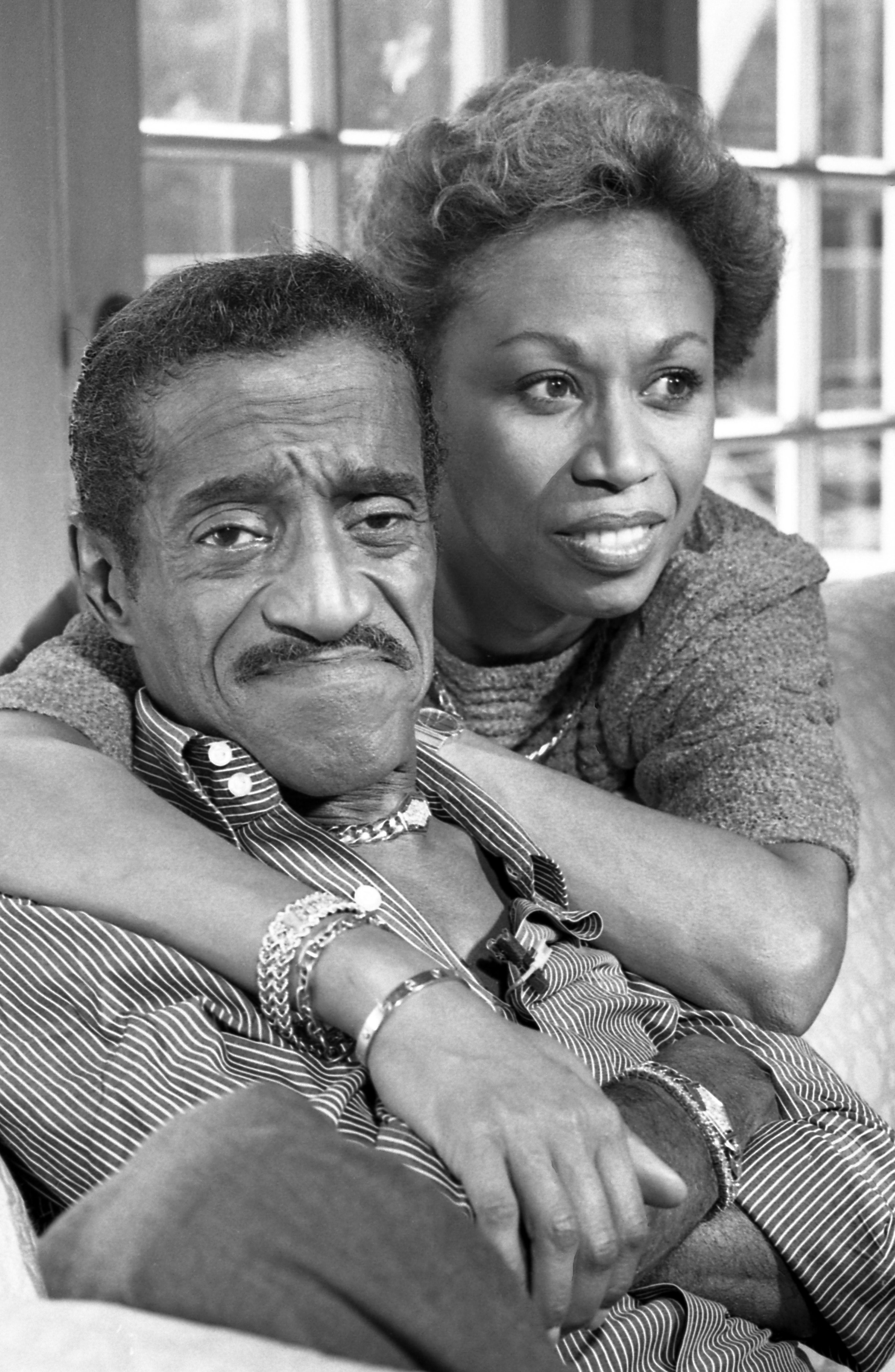
Sammy Davis Jr. with his third wife, Altovise Gore, taken at their home in Los Angeles, California

In 1968, Gore began a relationship with Sammy Davis Jr. They were married on May 11, 1970, by Reverend Jesse Jackson and adopted a son, Manny, in 1989. The couple remained married until Sammy Davis Jr.'s death in 1990.

Long saddled with tax problems following the death of her husband, Altovise Davis was included in 2008 on the California Franchise Tax Board's list of the top 250 delinquent taxpayers, with $2,708,901.75 in unpaid personal income tax.

=== Death ===
Davis died of complications from a stroke on March 14, 2009, at age 65 in Los Angeles. She is interred in an unmarked grave at Forest Lawn Memorial Park in Glendale, California, next to her husband.

== Filmography ==
Year	Title	Role	Notes
1974	Welcome to Arrow Beach	Deputy Molly	
1976	Pipe Dreams	Lydia	
1977	Kingdom of the Spiders	Birch Colby	
1979	Boardwalk	Mrs. Bell	
1980	Can't Stop the Music	Alicia Edwards	
1986	The Perils of P.K.		(final film role)
