= Oliver MacGreevy =

Irish actor (1928–1981)

Oliver John MacGreevy
- Born: 25 July 1928; Dublin, Ireland
- Died: October 1981 (age 53)
- Years active: 1957-1980

Oliver John MacGreevy (25 July 1928 – October 1981) was an Irish actor who appeared in many British films and television series from the mid 1950s until he retired in 1980, often as brutish, shaven-headed villains.

Among his roles he played Housemartin in The Ipcress File (1965) and made an appearance as both the Gardener and the Electrician in the first episode of The Prisoner TV series ("Arrival", 1967). He also appeared in an episode of Thriller (1975).

On stage, he appeared in Tom Murphy's A Whistle in the Dark at Joan Littlewood's Theatre Royal, Stratford East, in London, 1961.

== Filmography ==
Year	Title	Role	Notes
1957	The Scamp	Building Foreman	
1963	The Rivals	Cafe owner	Edgar Wallace Mysteries
1963	Incident at Midnight	Wilkinson	Edgar Wallace Mysteries
1964	The Leather Boys	Merchant Seaman	
1964	Girl with Green Eyes	Duggan	uncredited
1965	The Ipcress File	Housemartin	
1965	Licensed to Kill	First Russian Commissar	
1965	Up Jumped a Swagman	The Bald Man	
1966	Modesty Blaise	Tattooed Man	
1966	Kiss the Girls and Make Them Die	Ringo	
1966	The Frozen Dead	Joseph the butler	
1966	The Christmas Tree	Baldy the Crook	
1967	The Whisperers	2nd Redeemer at Mission	
1968	Salt and Pepper	Rack	
1968	Great Catherine	General Pskov	
1968	The Fixer	Guard	uncredited
1969	The Nine Ages of Nakedness	Hargreaves	(Segment: The Old Dark House)
1971	When Eight Bells Toll	Quinn	
1972	Tales from the Crypt	Maniac	(Segment: And All Through the House)
1972	The Ruling Class	Inmate #3	
1974	The Four Musketeers	Headsman	uncredited
1977	No. 1 of the Secret Service	Simms	
1980	Flash Gordon	Klytus Observer No. 1	
