= The Christmas Tree (1966 film) =

1966 children's film by Jim Clark

- Directed by: Jim Clark
- Screenplay by: Michael Barnes
- Starring: William Burleigh; Kate Nicholls; Anthony Honour
- Cinematography: Peter Suschitzky
- Edited by: Colin Cherrill
- Music by: Douglas Gamley
- Production company: Augusta Productions Limited
- Release date: 1966
- Running time: 56 minutes
- Country: United Kingdom
- Language: English

The Christmas Tree is a 1966 British children's adventure film directed by Jim Clark and starring William Burleigh, Kate Nicholls and Anthony Honour, with an early film role for Brian Blessed. It was written by Ed Harper and Michael Barnes and produced for the Children's Film Foundation. A group of children take a Christmas tree to a London hospital.

== Plot ==
A trio of children are given the task of transporting a Christmas tree to a London hospital for Christmas. They narrowly manage to get it onto a bus, much to the annoyance of other passengers and then it is carried on the back of a jeep while they hitch a ride on a motorcycle. They carry it through rural villages, and accidentally drop it in a river, requiring them to rescue it. They hitch a ride in an American car, which turns out to be driven by robbers. Hearing a description of them over the radio, the children disperse the stolen money out of the back door window while travelling through a village, leading to their arrest. The Christmas tree finds itself on a tank on military property, 30 miles from London before finally reaching its destination thanks to an army bus of soldiers and a truck.

The film ends at St Vincent's Hospital with the children and a bespectacled Santa singing carols by the repaired and now well-decorated tree.

== Cast ==
- William Burleigh as Gary
- Kate Nicholls as Jane
- Anthony Honour as Sam
- Doreen Keogh as mother
- Anthony Baird as father
- Oliver MacGreevy as Baldy the crook
- George Tovey as Darky the crook
- Brian Blessed as mobile policeman
- Geoffrey Whitehead as policeman
- Sydney Bromley as car driver (uncredited)
- Alan Lake as truck driver (uncredited)

== Reception ==
The Monthly Film Bulletin wrote: "Perhaps the engineering of the adventures into which the children are propelled is rather strained, and perhaps the adult characters involved are more than usually obliging: nevertheless, the film is presented with appropriate aplomb and is exciting enough to carry along the audience for whom it is intended. The acting is rather uneven, and of the three principal juvenile players William Burleigh is a little stiff, but Kate Nicholls is completely self-possessed as the girl, and Anthony Honour as little Sam is most engaging."
