= Truck Stop Women =

1974 American film

- Theatrical release poster
- Directed by: Mark L. Lester
- Written by: Mark L. Lester; Paul Deason
- Story by: Paul Deason
- Produced by: Mark Lester executive Peter Traynor
- Starring: Claudia Jennings; Lieux Dressler; Dennis Fimple; Gene Drew; Paul Carr; Jennifer Burton
- Production company: LT Films
- Distributed by: American International Pictures
- Release date: 1974
- Running time: 88 minutes
- Country: United States
- Language: English
- Budget: $300,000
- Box office: $4 million (est.)

Truck Stop Women is a 1974 film, directed by Mark L. Lester and partly financed by Phil Gramm.

== Plot ==
A mother (Lieux Dressler) runs a brothel for truckers on the New Mexico highways and her stable includes her daughter (Claudia Jennings). The daughter is sick of her mother controlling things and begins working with some men from the "Eastern Mafia" who are attempting to take over their operation.

== Cast ==
- Claudia Jennings as Rose
- Lieux Dressler as Anna
- Dennis Fimple as Curly
- Gene Drew as Mac
- Paul Carr as Seago
- Jennifer Burton as Tina
- Johnny Martino as Smith

== Production ==
The film was partly financed by Peter Traynor a real estate millionaire.

Mark Lester said, "My movies were always harking back to exploitation movies of the '40s and '50s" and that he was particularly inspired by White Heat (1949). "When she runs around the cattle truck shooting her gun off in that scene, I was thinking of the scene where James Cagney is shooting off the gun in the trunk of the car."

Mark Lester later recalled "“When I finished the movie, there wasn’t enough sex in it according to the distributors. They said, ‘Well, nothing ever happens—the truck stop women are never naked and they never do anything sexy.’ So I shot a couple of extra days. That’s when I did the sex scene with Claudia.”

== Reception ==
The Los Angeles Times called it "a lurid, raucous, rootin'-tootin' exploitationer" in which "Lester demonstrates a terrific sense of style and pace and a remarkable control."

In September 1974 Lester said the film had earned $2 million and was on track to make $4 million.
