= The Cox Twins =

British entertainers

Frank and Fred Cox
- The Cox Twins entertain a fan on the Holloway Road.
- Born: Francis Thomas Cox; Frederick Cox; 4 December 1920; Cardiff, Wales
- Died: Frank: 10 November 2007 (aged 86) Fred: 28 September 2013 (aged 92); Islington, London, England
- Occupations: Entertainers, actors, singers
- Years active: 1932–2007
- Spouse(s): Frank: Estelle Miles (1951–1984; her death); Fred: Pauline Miles (1951–2013; his death)

Francis Thomas Cox (4 December 1920 – 10 November 2007) and Frederick Cox (4 December 1920 – 28 September 2013), known as The Cox Twins, were British entertainers in the Music Hall tradition. They were identical twin brothers.

== Career ==
Their career began with Steffani's Songsters and they then appeared in the Ralph Reader RAF Gang Shows during World War II, touring Europe and North Africa. Later they went into Variety, performing in summer seasons and pantomime. They married twins sisters, Estelle and Pauline Miles, who became part of their act. In 1972 they appeared as Tweedledum and Tweedledee in the film Alice's Adventures in Wonderland. Other films in which the twins appeared include Up Jumped a Swagman (1965) with Frank Ifield, as the "Book People" "Pride" and "Prejudice" in Fahrenheit 451 (1966) as well as Funny Bones (1995) with Lee Evans and Jerry Lewis. Their numerous television appearances included Barrymore and The Story of Light Entertainment (2006) with Stephen Fry and Simon Cowell.

== Personal lives ==
When Frank's wife, Estelle, died in 1984, Fred's wife continued to appear with the twins, the act being known as "The Cox Twins and Pauline". They were presented with Lifetime Achievement Rose Bowls by the British Music Hall Society.

== Deaths ==
By 2007, their public appearances were limited to RAF reunions. Frank Cox died on 10 November 2007; Fred Cox died on 28 September 2013.
