= Frank Ifield =

Australian singer and guitarist (1937–2024)

Frank Ifield OAM

Background information
- Born: Francis Edward Ifield; 30 November 1937; Coundon, Coventry, England
- Died: 18 May 2024 (aged 86) Sydney, Australia
- Genres: Country; easy listening
- Occupation: Musician
- Instruments: Vocals; guitar
- Years active: 1953–1986
- Labels: Regal Zonophone Records/EMI; Columbia/EMI; Vee-Jay
- Website: frankifield.com

Francis Edward Ifield (30 November 1937 – 18 May 2024) was an Australian country music singer and guitarist who often incorporated yodelling into his music.

Born in the United Kingdom, Ifield grew up in rural Australia, where he started performing hillbilly music in his teens. He released singles which were successful in Australia and New Zealand. He returned to the UK in 1959 where he had four number-one hits on the UK singles chart in the early 1960s with his cover versions of "I Remember You", "Lovesick Blues", "The Wayward Wind" and "Confessin' That I Love You".

In 1986, he contracted pneumonia, which resulted in removal of part of a lung and damage to his vocal cords. He relocated to Sydney in 1988 and was unable to sing or yodel for years as he recovered.

In 2003, Ifield was inducted into the Australian Roll of Renown. Ifield was inducted into the ARIA Hall of Fame at the ARIA Music Awards of 2007. In June 2009, he was presented with the Medal of the Order of Australia for "service to the arts as an entertainer".

== Career ==
=== Early years ===
Frank Ifield was born on 30 November 1937 in Coundon, Coventry to Australian parents Richard Joseph Ifield (1909–1982) and Hannah Muriel (née Livesey) (c. 1916–2012), as one of seven sons. His parents had travelled to England in 1936, where his father was an inventor and engineer who created the Ifield fuel pump, used in jet aircraft, for Lucas Industries.

The Ifield family returned to Australia in January 1948 aboard the liner RMS Orion. They lived near Dural, 50 km (31 mi) north-west of Sydney. It was a rural district and he listened to hillbilly music (later called country music) while milking the family's cow. He was given a guitar in 1949 by his grandmother and was self-taught; he also taught himself to yodel, by imitating country stars, including Hank Snow.

The family moved to Beecroft, a Sydney suburb. At the age of 13, he performed his version of Bill Showmet's "Did You See My Daddy Over There?" and appeared on local radio station 2GB's talent quest, Amateur Hour. This track was issued as his first single, in 1953, by Regal Zonophone Records. By November of that year, he appeared regularly on Brisbane radio station 4BK's Youth Parade, playing guitar and singing, where, "All the artists in this programme are under 21 years of age."

His third single was a cover version of "Abdul Abulbul Amir" (September 1954), which was backed by his own composition, "A Mother's Faith". In 1956, he hosted Campfire Favourites on local TV station TCN-9, which "was the first weekly 'Western' programme by a local artist on Australian television." From that year to late 1957, he recorded six singles with a backing group, Dick Carr Buckaroos.

In 1957, he recorded the track "Whiplash", which was used as the theme song for the British/Australian TV series of the same title from September 1960 to mid-1961. He toured the North Island of New Zealand in early 1959 where his single, "Guardian Angel", reached No. 1 on local radio charts. Ifield had two top 30 hits in that year on the Kent Music Report, with "True" (September, No. 26) and "Teenage Baby" (November, No. 23). He returned to the United Kingdom in November 1959.

=== 1960s success ===
Ifield's first UK single, "Lucky Devil" (January 1960), reached No. 22 on the UK singles chart. His next six singles had less commercial success, but he had his first UK number-one hit with a cover version of the Victor Schertzinger and Johnny Mercer 1941 composition "I Remember You" (May 1962), which topped the charts for seven weeks. Known for Ifield's falsetto and a slight yodel, it was the second highest-selling single of that year in the UK, and became the seventh million-selling single. It is Ifield's highest-charting single on the United States Billboard Hot 100, reaching No. 5. It also reached No. 1 on the Australian Kent Music Report.

His next single was a double A-side, "Lovesick Blues" and "She Taught Me How to Yodel" (October 1962). "Lovesick Blues", originally sung by Hank Williams, was treated in an upbeat "Let's Twist Again" style. The other track is a virtuoso piece of yodelling with the final verse – entirely yodelling – at double-speed. It also peaked at No. 1 in the UK, No. 2 in Australia, and reached No. 44 on the US Billboard Hot 100. He had been told by his management not to yodel because it would brand him. Nevertheless, he sang "She Taught Me to Yodel" as an encore for a Royal Variety Performance (November 1962), at the specific request of the Queen Mother for a yodelling song. His next single, "Wayward Wind", made him the first UK-based artist to reach No. 1 three times in succession on the UK charts. The only previous artist to have done so was Elvis Presley. In Australia, it peaked at No. 16.

His UK charting singles from 1963 were "Nobody's Darlin' but Mine" (April 1963, No. 4), "Confessin' (That I Love You)" (June, No. 1), "Mule Train" (October, No. 22) and "Don't Blame Me" (December, No. 8). In 1963, he sang at the Grand Ole Opry, introduced by one of his heroes, Hank Snow. Many of his records were produced by Norrie Paramor. Ifield was also featured on Jolly What!, a 1964 compilation comprising eight of his tracks and four by the Beatles, which has been considered an attempt to cash in on Beatlemania. (Vee-Jay Records had acquired US distribution rights to the Beatles along with Ifield.) Despite changing trends, Ifield continued to have further top 40 hits in that decade including "Angry at the Big Oak Tree" (April 1964), "I Should Care" (July), "Paradise" (August 1965), "No One Will Ever Know" (June 1966), and "Call Her Your Sweetheart" (September).

In 1965, he starred in "Up Jumped a Swagman" a movie about an Australian moving to London. it features many songs by Ifield. The same year he started in Babes in the Wood, the London Palladium pantomime, which every year headlined with artists who had achieved popular success in the year.

Ifield twice entered the UK heats for the Eurovision Song Contest. He came in second in the 1962 heat with "Alone Too Long" (losing to Ronnie Carroll). In the 1976 heat he tried with "Ain't Gonna Take No for an Answer", finishing last of 12.

=== Later years ===
In 1991, Ifield returned to the UK chart when a dance remix of "She Taught Me How to Yodel", renamed "The Yodeling Song" and billed as Frank Ifield featuring the Backroom Boys, reached No. 40 on the UK Singles Chart. In more than 30 years, it became his 16th appearance on the chart. The song was mentioned by Victor Meldrew in the One Foot in the Grave episode, "Love and Death".

In 2003, Ifield was inducted into the Australian Roll of Renown. Ifield was inducted into the ARIA Hall of Fame at the ARIA Music Awards of 2007. In June 2009, he was presented with the Medal of the Order of Australia for "service to the arts as an entertainer". He was first married to Gillian Bowden (1965–88) and the couple had two children. His second marriage was to Carole Wood (1992 to his death). In 2005, he co-wrote his autobiography I Remember Me: the First 25 Years, with Pauline Halford.

== Personal life ==
Ifield married Gillian Bowden, a dancer at the London Palladium, on 6 July 1965 at Marylebone Register Office, London. Ifield starred as Dave Kelly, and Bowden appeared as a dancer in the comedy musical film Up Jumped a Swagman (December 1965). The couple had two children.

In 1986, Ifield contracted pneumonia and required surgery to remove part of a lung. As a result, his vocal cords were damaged, which meant he could not sing or yodel for years until they recovered. He and Bowden divorced in 1988 and he returned to Sydney to live. In 1992, he married Carole Wood, an airline hostess.

Ifield died in Hornsby Hospital in Hornsby, New South Wales of pneumonia on 18 May 2024, at the age of 86.

== Bibliography ==
- Ifield, Frank (1963), Meet Frank Ifield, World Distributors
- Ifield, Frank; Halford, Pauline (2005), I Remember Me: the First 25 Years, Kempton Marks, ISBN 978-0-7552-0501-1

== Discography ==
=== Albums ===
List of albums, with selected chart positions
Title	Album details	Peak chart positions	
Title	Album details	UK	US Country
Yours Sincerely	Released: 1959 Label: Regal Zonophone Records/Columbia (33-OEX 7513) Format: LP Producer:	—	—
I Remember You	Released: December 1962 Label: Vee-Jay Records/Columbia (LP-1054, SR-1054/33-SX 1467) Format: LP Producer: Norrie Paramor	3	—
Frank Ifield	Released: 1963 Label: World Record Club Format: LP Producer: Norrie Paramor	—	—
Born Free	Released: August 1963 Label: EMI/Columbia (33-SX-1534, SCX-3485) Format: LP Producer: Norrie Paramor	3	—
Blue Skies	Released: March 1964 Label: EMI/Columbia (33-SX-1588, SCX-3505) Format: LP Producer: Norrie Paramor	10	—
Frank Ifield's Greatest Hits	Released: September 1964 Label: EMI/Columbia (33-SX-1633) Format: LP Producer: Norrie Paramor	9	—
Portrait in Song	Released: May 1965 Label: EMI/Columbia (33-SX-1723, SCX-3551) Format: LP Producer: Norrie Paramor	—	—
Up Jumped a Swagman	Released: December 1965 Label: EMI/Columbia (SX-33-1751, SCXO-3559) Format: LP Producer: Norrie Paramor	—	—
Frank Ifield's Tale of Two Cities	Released: 1966 Label: Hickory Records (LPM 136, LPS 136) Format: LP Producer: Norrie Paramor	—	35
Close to You	Released: 1966 Label: Columbia (SX6080) Format: LP	—	—
Call Her Your Sweetheart	Released: 1967 Label: Capitol Records (ST 6176) Format: LP	—	—
Rovin' Lover	Released: 1967 Label: Hickory Records (LPS 144) Format: LP	—	—
You Came Along	Released: 1967 Label: Columbia (SX 6147) Format: LP	—	—
The Singer & the Song	Released: 1968 Label: Columbia (SX 6225) Format: LP	—	—
Happy Tracks	Released: 1968 Label: Columbia (SX 6276) Format: LP	—	—
Frank Ifield	Released: 1970 Label: Decca (SKL 5064) Format: LP	—	—
Someone to Give My Love to	Released: 1973 Label: Spark (SRLP 111) Format: LP	—	—
Joanne	Released: 1975 Label: Blue Jean Records (BL 16905) Format: LP Producer: Norrie Paramor	—	—
Ain't Gonna Take No for an Answer	Released: 1976 Label: Interfusion (L 35813) Format: LP	—	—
One More Mile...One More Town	Released: 1977 Label: EMI (EMC.2638) Format: LP	—	—
Frank Ifield & Barbary Coast (with Barbary Coast)	Released: 1978 Label: Fi Records Format: LP	—	—
Frank Ifield Sings	Released: 1978 Label: Fi Records (FIR 3782) Format: LP	—	—
Sweet Vibrations	Released: 1979 Label: Fi Records (FIR 3782) Format: LP	—	—
Portrait Of	Released: 1982 Label: PRT (N 146) Format: LP	—	—
I Remember These	Released: 1985 Label: Axis (AX260444) Format: LP	—	—
"—" denotes releases that did not chart or were not released in that country.

=== Singles ===
List of singles, with selected chart positions, showing year released
Title (songwriters)	Year	Peak chart positions			
Title (songwriters)	Year	AUS	UK	US	US Country
"True" (Elaine Goddard)	1959	26	—	—	—
"Teenage Baby" (Herman Guidry)	1959	23	—	—	—
"Lucky Devil" (Wally Gold/Aaron Schroeder)	1960	—	22	—	—
"Gotta Get a Date" (Berry/Ginsbery)	1960	—	49	—	—
"I Remember You" (Johnny Mercer/Victor Schertzinger)	1962	1	1	5	—
"Lovesick Blues" (Cliff Friend/Irving Mills)	1962	2	1	44	—
"The Wayward Wind" (Stanley Lebowsky/Herb Newman)	1963	16	1	104	—
"Nobody's Darlin' but Mine" (Jimmie Davis)	1963	41	4	—	—
"Confessin' (That I Love You)" (Doc Daugherty/Al J. Neiburg/Ellis Reynolds)	1963	24	1	58	—
"Mule Train" (Fred Glickman/Hy Heath/Johnny Lange)	1963	95	22	—	—
"Please" (Note: "Please" peaked at No. 39 on the CHUM Charts in Canada.) (Ralph Rainger/Leo Robin)	1963	5	—	71	—
"Don't Blame Me" (Dorothy Fields/Jimmy McHugh)	1964	43	8	128	—
"Angry at the Big Oak Tree" (Paul Hampton/Bob Hilliard)	1964	32	25	—	—
"I Should Care" (Sammy Cahn/Axel Stordahl/Paul Weston)	1964	—	33	—	—
"Summer Is Over" (Tom Springfield/Clive Westlake)	1964	40	25	—	—
"Don't Make Me Laugh" (Bill Giant/Patricia Valando)	1965	96	—	—	—
"Lonesome Number One" (Don Gibson)	1965	95	—	—	—
"Paradise" (Nacio Herb Brown/Gordon Clifford)	1965	88	26	—	—
"No One Will Ever Know" (Mel Foree/Fred Rose)	1966	—	25	—	42
"Call Her Your Sweetheart" (Leon Payne)	1966	79	24	—	28
"Out of Nowhere" (Johnny Green/Edward Heyman)	1967	75	—	132	—
"Up, Up and Away" (Jimmy Webb)	1967	81	—	—	—
"Good Morning, Dear" (Mickey Newbury)	1968	—	—	—	67
"Oh, Such a Stranger" (Don Gibson)	1968	—	—	—	68
"It's My Time" (Note: "It's My Time" peaked at No. 12 on the RPM Country Tracks chart in Canada.) (John D. Loudermilk)	1969	—	—	—	—
"Daddy Don't You Walk So Fast" (Peter Callander/Geoff Stephens)	1972	68	—	—	—
"The Yodeling Song (Remix)" (Note: Credited to Frank Ifield featuring the Backroom Boys) (Tom Emerson/Paul Roberts/Van Esther Sciver)	1991	—	40	—	—

== Awards and honors ==
In June 2009, he was presented with a Medal of the Order of Australia, with a citation for "service to the arts as an entertainer."

On 10 June 2012, Ifield joined Paul Hazell on his World of Country show on the community radio station Uckfield FM. He discussed his life in music and forthcoming induction to the Coventry Music Wall of Fame.

=== Australian Roll of Renown ===
The Australian Roll of Renown honours Australian and New Zealander musicians who have shaped the music industry by making a significant and lasting contribution to country music. It was inaugurated in 1976 and the inductee is announced at the Country Music Awards of Australia in Tamworth every January.

Year	Nominee / work	Award	Result
2003	Frank Ifield	Australian Roll of Renown	inductee

=== ARIA Music Awards ===
The ARIA Music Awards is an annual awards ceremony that recognises excellence, innovation, and achievement across all genres of Australian music. It commenced in 1987. Ifield was inducted into the Hall of Fame in 2007.

Year	Nominee / work	Award	Result
2007	Frank Ifield	ARIA Hall of Fame	inductee

=== Mo Awards ===
The Australian Entertainment Mo Awards (commonly known informally as the Mo Awards), were annual Australian entertainment industry awards. It recognised achievements in live entertainment in Australia from 1975 to 2016. Ifield won one award in that time.

Year	Nominee / work	Award	Result (wins only)
2009	Frank Ifield	Hall of Fame	inductee
