= She Taught Me How to Yodel =

Song written by Paul Roberts and Tom Emerson

"She Taught Me How to Yodel" is a song written by Paul Roberts and Tom Emerson.

The song was first recorded and released (under the title "She Taught to Yodel") by Elton Britt.

In the 1960s, it was a hit for Frank Ifield.

There is also a female version of the song, titled "He Taught Me How to Yodel" or "He Taught Me to Yodel", and it has been sung by the likes of Rosalie Allen and Margo Smith and, in the 2000s, Taylor Ware.

== Charts ==
"The Yodelling Song" by Frank Ifield and the Backroom Boys

Chart (1991)	Peak position
UK Singles (OCC)	40
