= Kingdom of the Spiders =

1977 film by John Cardos

- Theatrical release poster
- Directed by: John "Bud" Cardos
- Screenplay by: Alan Caillou; Richard Robinson
- Story by: Stephen Lodge; Jeffrey M. Sneller
- Produced by: Igo Kantor; Jeffrey M. Sneller
- Starring: William Shatner; Tiffany Bolling; Woody Strode; Altovise Davis; Lieux Dressler; David McLean; Natasha Ryan; Marcy Lafferty
- Cinematography: John Arthur Morrill
- Edited by: Igo Kantor; Steven Zaillian
- Music by: Dorsey Burnette
- Production company: Arachnid Productions Ltd.
- Distributed by: Dimension Pictures (United States); United Artists (International)
- Release date: November 23, 1977
- Running time: 89 minutes
- Country: United States
- Language: English
- Budget: $1 million
- Box office: $17 million

Kingdom of the Spiders is a 1977 American science fiction horror film directed by John "Bud" Cardos and produced by Igo Kantor and Jeffrey M. Sneller. The screenplay is credited to Richard Robinson and Alan Caillou, from an original story by Sneller and Stephen Lodge. Part of the eco-horror subgenre, Kingdom of the Spiders centers on a rural town in Camp Verde, Arizona which lies in the migration path of a horde of tarantulas turned aggressive due to pesticides having depleted their normal food sources. The film was released by Dimension Pictures (not to be confused with the distributor Dimension Films). It stars William Shatner, Tiffany Bolling, Woody Strode, Lieux Dressler, and Altovise Davis.

== Plot ==
Dr. Robert "Rack" Hansen, a veterinarian in rural Verde Valley, Arizona, receives an urgent call. Farmer Walter Colby's prize calf is sick, and dies shortly afterward. Hansen sends samples of the calf's blood to a university lab in Flagstaff.

Diane Ashley, an arachnologist, arrives to tell Hansen that the calf was killed by spider venom. Hansen greets the news with skepticism. Undaunted, Ashley tells him that she wishes to examine the carcass and the area where it became sick. Hansen escorts Ashley to Colby's farm. Colby's wife, Birch, discovers their dog is dead, also from a massive injection of spider venom. Colby shows Hansen and Ashley a massive "spider hill" he recently found on a back section of his farmland, which is filled with tarantulas. Ashley theorizes that the tarantulas are converging due to the heavy use of pesticides, which are eradicating their natural food supply. In order to survive, the spiders, normally cannibalistic, are combining to attack and eat larger animals.

Hansen and Ashley return to the Colby farm to burn the spider hill. A bull, attacked by tarantulas, runs out of a barn. Colby douses the spider hill with gasoline and lights it on fire, but many of the spiders escape using a tunnel. Colby is attacked by tarantulas while driving his truck the next day, sending the truck over the side of a hill. Hansen happens upon the accident scene and he and Sheriff Gene Smith find Colby's body encased in spider thread. Ashley is notified by her colleagues that a sample of venom from one of the spiders is five times more toxic than normal. The sheriff locates several more spider hills on Colby's property.

The mayor of Camp Verde orders the sheriff to spray the hills and the surrounding countryside with pesticide. Ashley protests that pesticide would be at best a short term solution, since other spiders will continue to use the same migration path to find more food, and that the town should bring in birds and rats (tarantulas' natural enemies) to balance the ecosystem. The mayor dismisses the idea, fearing that having a large number of spiders and rats would scare away patrons of the county fair. A crop duster is enlisted to spray the pesticide. Once airborne, the pilot is attacked by tarantulas, causing him to fly wildly, spraying the residential areas of the town with toxic pesticide, and finally crash.

The spiders begin assaulting residents, killing Birch and Hansen's sister-in-law, Terri. Hansen arrives at their home and rescues Terri's daughter, Linda. Hansen, Ashley and Linda take refuge in the Washburn Lodge and consult with the sheriff, who tells them the spiders are everywhere and Camp Verde is cut off. Sheriff Smith drives into town, while Hansen and the other survivors at the lodge plan to load up an RV and escape. However, the spiders have them trapped in the lodge, and they barricade themselves inside. Smith arrives at Camp Verde and finds the town under siege by the spiders. He is killed when another car crashes into a support post under the town's water tower, causing it to fall on his vehicle.

At the lodge, the spiders destroy a fuse, shutting off power. Hansen ventures into the basement to change the fuse. He succeeds, but is besieged by spiders who break through a basement window, and after getting back upstairs, faints from the venom. The next day, the survivors rig up a radio receiver and listen for news of the attacks. To their surprise, the radio broadcast does not mention the attack; the outside world is oblivious to what happened. Hansen pries off the boards from one of the lodge's windows, and discovers the building, along with the entire town of Camp Verde, is encased in spider silk cocoons.

== Cast ==
- William Shatner as Rack Hansen
- Natasha Ryan as Linda Hansen
- Marcy Lafferty as Terri Hansen
- Tiffany Bolling as Diane Ashley
- Woody Strode as Walter Colby
- Altovise Davis as Birch Colby
- Lieux Dressler as Emma Washburn
- David McLean as Gene Smith
- Roy Engel as Mayor Connors
- Joe Ross as Vern Johnson
- Adele Malis-Morey as Betty Johnson
- Audrey McCracken as little girl

== Production ==
Kantor told Fangoria magazine in 1998 that the film did indeed use 5,000 of the large, hairy spiders, though a number of rubber model spiders were also used during production. The live tarantulas were procured by offering Mexican spider wranglers US$10 for each live tarantula they could find; this meant that $50,000 of the film's $500,000 budget went towards the purchase of spiders.

The large number of tarantulas kept on hand led to some unusual production difficulties. Not only did each spider have to be kept warm, but because of the creatures' cannibalistic tendencies, all 5,000 spiders had to be kept in separate containers. Additionally, tarantulas are usually shy around people, so fans and air tubes often had to be used to get the spiders to move toward their "victims".

The venom of most tarantulas is not dangerous to humans, causing no more harm than a bee sting (unless the person is allergic to the venom). This is why the film mentions that the species which appears in the film has venom five times more potent than normal. The worst injury most of the actors suffered was troublesome itching, caused by the spiders shedding their bristles.

== Reception ==
In a retrospective feature on 1970s horror films, Syfy.com called Kingdom of the Spiders "surprisingly scary", said the film is strong on tension from beginning to end, and praised Shatner's restrained performance, though they felt that the use of a cheap matte for the closing shot prevented it from being a classic horror ending. Dread Central disagreed on this point in their review of the DVD release, with reviewer Steve Barton saying the final shot is "one of the best horror endings of the century. The last frame of film has haunted this reviewer for decades, and I’m willing to bet it will have the same harrowing effect on you." He found the film was filled with both unintentional silliness and genuinely intense scenes of horror, and said the DVD's bonus features are highly entertaining.

== Home media ==
Shout! Factory released Kingdom of The Spiders: Special Edition on DVD in early 2010.

== Rumored sequel ==
Ad for the American Film Market

Rumors have occasionally surfaced that a sequel to Kingdom of the Spiders was in production. Shatner told Fangoria in 1998 that he was working with Cannon Films in the late 1980s to produce a sequel, titled simply Kingdom of the Spiders 2. The actor claimed that he supplied the film's premise, which would have featured a man being tortured by his enemies, preying upon his intense fear of spiders, to get him to reveal a secret. Cannon went so far as to take out a full-page advertisement in Variety magazine announcing that Shatner would direct and star in the film, but the studio went bankrupt before production could begin.

In 2003, the website for Port Hollywood, a film production company run by Kantor and Howard James Reekie, posted a brief synopsis of the plot of another proposed sequel, to be titled Kingdom of the Spiders II, suggesting that the villainous spiders would this time be driven to attack humans due to secret government experiments involving extremely low frequency (or ELF). The synopsis also details Native American imagery that would factor into the plot.

== Legacy ==
Kantor hinted in his Fangoria interview that Arachnophobia, which Steven Spielberg produced, bears several similarities to Kingdom of the Spiders. "I thought it was a copy," Kantor stated, "But you don't go and sue Steven Spielberg!"

== In popular culture ==
The film was featured on the Rifftrax April 23, 2013 video on demand download, with commentary by Mystery Science Theater 3000 alumni Michael J. Nelson, Kevin Murphy and Bill Corbett.
