= Wayne McLaren =

American stuntman, model, actor, and rodeo performer

- Born: Lawrence Gilbert McLaren; September 12, 1940; Lake Charles, Louisiana, US
- Died: July 22, 1992 (aged 51); Newport Beach, California, US
- Occupations: Stuntman; model; actor; rodeo performer
- Years active: 1969–1992

Wayne McLaren (born Lawrence Gilbert McLaren; September 12, 1940 – July 22, 1992) was an American stuntman, model, actor, and rodeo performer.

== Biography ==
McLaren worked as a stuntman and rodeo rider before being hired to appear in advertisements for Marlboro. McLaren competed in bronc riding and bull riding events. In 1976, he did promotional work for the famous Marlboro cigarette advertising campaign as the "Marlboro Man".

After developing lung cancer in 1990, McLaren became an antismoking crusader, citing his 30-year smoking habit as the cause of his cancer. During the time of McLaren's antismoking activism, Philip Morris denied that McLaren ever appeared in a Marlboro ad. In response, McLaren produced an affidavit from a talent agency that had represented him and a paycheck stub asserting that he had been paid for work on a "Marlboro print" job.

Just before his death, a television spot was filmed showing images of him appearing as the cowboy juxtaposed with those of him on his hospital bed; his brother, Charles McLaren, gave a voiceover about the dangers of smoking and noted that the tobacco industry promoted an "independent lifestyle" before finally summarizing, "Lying there with all those tubes in you, how independent can you really be?"

David McLean is another actor who portrayed the Marlboro Man and died of lung cancer.

== Filmography ==
Film
| Year | Title | Role | Notes |
|---|---|---|---|
| 1969 | Paint Your Wagon | Miner | Stunts; Uncredited |
| 1972 | The Honkers | Everett | |
| 1972 | Junior Bonner | | Uncredited |
| 1972 | Cry for Me, Billy | Soldier | Stunts |
Television
| Year | Title | Role | Notes |
| 1968 | Mission: Impossible | Artie Calvitos | 2 episodes |
| 1969 | The Mod Squad | Miller | 1 episode |
| 1971 | The F.B.I. | Jay Yarborough | 1 episode |
| 1971 | Cannon | Jackie / T.J. | TV movie |
| 1972–1973 | Cannon | Harold Degnan / Alex Farrell | 2 episodes, (final appearance) |
| 1973 | Gunsmoke | Homer | 1 episode |
