= Another Nice Mess =

1972 film by Bob Einstein

- Theatrical release poster.
- Directed by: Bob Einstein
- Written by: Bob Einstein
- Produced by: Jonathan Haze; Tom Smothers
- Starring: Rich Little; Herb Voland; Bruce Kirby; Diahn Williams; Stewart Bradley
- Cinematography: John A. Alonzo
- Edited by: Graham Lee Mahin
- Music by: Bob Emenegger
- Distributed by: Fine Films
- Release date: September 22, 1972
- Running time: 66 min
- Country: United States
- Language: English

Another Nice Mess is a 1972 comedy film written and directed by Bob Einstein and starring Rich Little as Richard Nixon and Herb Voland as Spiro Agnew.

== Plot ==
The film is presented in the style of a Laurel and Hardy comedy, with Nixon in the Oliver Hardy role, and Agnew in the Stan Laurel role.

== Cast ==
- Rich Little as Richard Nixon
- Herb Voland as Spiro Agnew
- Bruce Kirby as Adolph
- Diahn Williams as Anita
- Stewart Bradley as Guilford
- Magda Harout as Duchess of Zanzig
- Steve Martin as Hippie (in his film debut)

== Production ==
The film was produced by Tom Smothers and Jonathan Haze. The film had a budget of between $250,000 and $1,000,000.

== Reception ==
The film made $30,000 at the box office and was subsequently buried by Smothers for 40 years who said "It was a terrible film"; co-producer Haze said "Another Nice Mess was a mess."

== See also ==
- List of American films of 1972
