= Junior Bonner =

1972 film

- Theatrical release poster
- Directed by: Sam Peckinpah
- Written by: Jeb Rosebrook
- Produced by: Joe Wizan
- Starring: Steve McQueen; Robert Preston; Ida Lupino; Joe Don Baker; Barbara Leigh; Ben Johnson
- Cinematography: Lucien Ballard
- Edited by: Frank Santillo; Robert L. Wolfe
- Music by: Jerry Fielding
- Production companies: ABC Pictures; Joe Wizan-Booth Gardner Productions; Solar Productions
- Distributed by: Cinerama Releasing Corporation (US and UK); 20th Century Fox (International)
- Release dates: June 11, 1972 (Dallas, Texas)
- Running time: 100 minutes
- Country: United States
- Language: English
- Budget: $3.2 million
- Box office: $2.8 million

Junior Bonner is a 1972 American contemporary Western film directed by Sam Peckinpah and starring Steve McQueen, Robert Preston, Joe Don Baker, and Ida Lupino. The film focuses on a veteran rodeo rider as he returns to his hometown of Prescott, Arizona, to participate in an annual rodeo competition and reunite with his brother and estranged parents. Many critics consider it to be the warmest and most gentle of Peckinpah's films.

Due to disagreements with McQueen, the original director, Carroll Ballard, was fired off the film after one month of pre-production work, and was replaced by Peckinpah.

== Plot ==
Junior "JR" Bonner is a rodeo cowboy who is slightly past his prime, although he will not admit it. Junior is first seen taping up his injuries after an unsuccessful ride on an ornery bull named Sunshine.

He returns home to Prescott for the Independence Day parade and rodeo. When he arrives, the Bonner family home is being bulldozed by his younger brother Curly, an entrepreneur and real-estate developer, to build a trailer park. Junior's womanizing father, Ace, and down-to-earth, long-suffering mother, Elvira, are estranged. Ace dreams of emigrating to Australia to rear sheep and mine gold, but he fails to obtain financing from Curly or Junior, who is broke.

After flooring his arrogant brother with a punch, Junior bribes rodeo owner Buck Roan to let him ride Sunshine again, promising him half the prize money. Buck thinks he must be crazy, but Junior actually manages to pull it off this time, going the full eight seconds on the bull.

Junior walks into a travel agent's office and buys his father a one-way, first-class ticket to Australia. The film's final shot shows JR leaving his hometown, his successful ride on Sunshine continuing to put off the inevitable end of his rodeo career.

== Cast ==
- Steve McQueen as Junior "J.R." Bonner
- Robert Preston as Ace Bonner
- Ida Lupino as Elvira Bonner
- Ben Johnson as Buck Roan
- Joe Don Baker as Curly Bonner
- Barbara Leigh as Charmagne
- Mary Murphy as Ruth Bonner
- Bill McKinney as Red Terwiliger
- Dub Taylor as Del
- Sandra Deel as Nurse Arlis
- Don "Red" Barry as Homer Rutledge
- Charles H. Gray as Burt

== Themes ==
The story explores one of Sam Peckinpah's favorite themes, the end of a traditional form of honor and the arrival of modern capitalism on the western frontier. In a memorable scene, Ace and Junior escape from the rodeo parade on Junior's horse, ending up at a deserted railway station, where they drink and despair at the state of the world and their indigency. The film enjoyed a resurgence of popularity in the mid-2000s because of retrospectives of Sam Peckinpah's work and the screenplay's predictions regarding capitalist development.

== Production ==
Star Steve McQueen originally approved Carroll Ballard as director after the involved parties were impressed by his documentary short Rodeo (1969) and believed that he was the man for the job. Ballard envisioned Junior Bonner as a portrayal of the "American phenomenon" that exists between rodeo champions: "A lot of them are obsessed with trying to prove their masculinity, to the point where it gets out of hand." After working on the film for approximately a month, Ballard was fired by McQueen due to the star's dissatisfaction with his working methods. Ballard believes that this was because McQueen was apprehensiveness about playing a vulnerable character, explaining:

"I was trying to get [McQueen] to be this really insecure guy who has to pump himself up to do this stuff and have that relationship with the other guys. I don't know for sure, but I think that made McQueen really uneasy, so he bailed and brought in Sam [Peckinpah]. McQueen actually was a very insecure guy—and that's the guy I wanted, if he'd been willing to play him. But McQueen was uncomfortable moving out of his own macho routine."

In May 1971, weeks after completing Straw Dogs (1971) in England, Peckinpah returned to the United States to begin immediate work on Junior Bonner. The lyrical screenplay by Jeb Rosebrook, depicting the changing times of society and binding family ties, appealed to Peckinpah's tastes. He accepted the project, concerned with being typed as a director of violent action. Junior Bonner would be his final attempt to make a low-key, dramatic work in the vein of Noon Wine (1966) and The Ballad of Cable Hogue (1970).

Filmed on location in Prescott, Arizona, Peckinpah used many colorful locales and residents as extras in the film.

== Reception ==
=== Box office ===
Released amidst a glut of rodeo-themed films, including The Honkers (1972), J.W. Coop (1972) and When the Legends Die (1972), Junior Bonner performed poorly at the box office. It earned rentals of $1.9 million in North America and $900,000 in other countries, recording an overall loss of $2,820,000.

Although the film was unwisely promoted as a typical Steve McQueen action vehicle, critical reception was still fairly good, but not enthusiastic. Peckinpah remarked, "I made a film where nobody got shot and nobody went to see it." Stinging from the financial failure of Junior Bonner, but eager to work with Peckinpah again, McQueen presented him Walter Hill's screenplay to The Getaway, which they would film months after completing Junior Bonner. The second collaboration proved to be a financially successful one, as the action film became one of the biggest box-office successes of their careers.

=== Critical ===
Roger Ebert, writing for the Chicago Sun-Times, gave the film two stars out of four and called it "a flat-out disappointment, despite Peckinpah's track record and his proven ability to elegize the West...the movie simply never comes together and works as a whole. The material is terribly thin."

Gary Arnold of The Washington Post stated that McQueen was given "precious little written character to play or emotion to express", and that the film was "easy to take, yet so insubstantial that there's no compelling reason to see or remember it. The film sort of drifts across the screen and fades from your mind an instant later."

The New York Times' Vincent Canby wrote: "Junior Bonner, which looks like a rodeo film and sounds like a rodeo film, is a superior family comedy in disguise."

Arthur D. Murphy of Variety wrote, "The latterday film genre of misunderstood-rodeo-drifter gets one of its best expositions in Junior Bonner, Sam Peckinpah's latest film, which makes another of his occasional shifts away from the bloodbath. Steve McQueen stars handily in the title role, with Robert Preston and Ida Lupino returning to pix in excellent well-turned characterizations as his estranged parents."

Gene Siskel of the Chicago Tribune gave the film three stars out of four, calling it: "A decent picture from a fine director."

Kevin Thomas of the Los Angeles Times wrote: "This lively, affectionate contemporary Western, which stars Steve McQueen in one of his finest performances, is one of the most enjoyable pictures Peckinpah has ever made and surely is his most appealing. What's more, it marks the return to the screen of Robert Preston and Ida Lupino, who also are at their best."

== Home media ==
Junior Bonner was released on DVD May 25, 2004, by MGM Home Entertainment as Region 1 widescreen; and May 17, 2005, as part of the boxed set, The Steve McQueen Collection, with Junior Bonner as the fourth movie of a four-disc set. The film was released on Blu-ray by Kino Lorber November 6, 2017.

== See also ==
- List of American films of 1972
