= Lieux Dressler =

American film and television actress (1930–2018)

Lieux Dressler (born Louise Aldrich; February 27, 1930 – February 8, 2018) was an American film and television actress.

== Life and career ==
Before becoming known as an actress, Dressler worked as a nightclub singer in Dallas. During this time, she was married to trombonist Morris Repass, with whom she had two sons. In the 1960s, her marriage ended, and she moved to Los Angeles to pursue an acting career. She operated an acting workshop, the Patio Playhouse, where she developed techniques that continue to be taught at acting classes.

During the 1970s, she appeared on various television series, including Columbo, Gunsmoke, Kolchak: the Night Stalker, and The Rockford Files. She was mostly recognized as Alice Grant, the long-suffering mother of Heather Grant Webber on the long-running daytime drama General Hospital from 1978-1983. She also appeared in feature films, most notably Truck Stop Women (1974), Kingdom of the Spiders (1977), and Point of No Return (1993), after which she retired from acting.

Lieux Dressler Repass died on February 8, 2018, at the age of 87.

== Filmography ==
Year	Title	Role	Notes
1970	That Girl	Secretary	Season 4 Episode 20: "Stocks & the Single Girl"
1970	The Young Lawyers	Maria Morusco	Season 1 Episode 7: "The Glass Prison"
1970	Room 222	Waitress / Mrs. Barnaby	2 episodes
1971	The Bold Ones: The Senator	Mrs. Ford	Season 1 Episode 6: "Some Day, They'll Elect a President"
1971	Columbo	Ceil Gentry	Season 1 Episode 2: "Death Lends a Hand"
1971	Sarge	Wanda Harris	Season 1 Episode 5: "A Push Over the Edge"
1971–1973	Gunsmoke	Victoria / Susie / Liz	5 episodes
1972	The New Centurions	Orville's Wife (uncredited)	
1972	Grave of the Vampire	Olga	
1973	The Red Pony	Dearie	TV Movie
1973	Love, American Style	Ruthie	Season 5 Episode 3: "segment: Love and the Golden Memory"
1974	Truck Stop Women	Anna	
1974	Rex Harrison Presents Stories of Love	Mrs. Hastings (segment "Epicac")	TV Movie
1974–1975	Police Woman	Mrs. Kelso / Arlene DeWitt	2 episodes
1975	A Shadow in the Streets	Lila	TV Movie
1975	A Cry for Help	Mae Dowd	TV Movie
1975	Kolchak: The Night Stalker	Minerva Musso	Season 1 Episode 18: "The Knightly Murders"
1975	The Blue Knight	Waitress	Season 1 Episode 0: "Pilot"
1976	Rich Man, Poor Man	Elsa	Miniseries (episode "Part II: Chapters 3 and 4")
1976	Medical Center	Belle	Season 7 Episode 20: "A Touch of Sight"
1976	The Return of the World's Greatest Detective	Mrs. Slater	TV Movie
1976	Hunter	Desk Clerk	Season 1 Episode 0: "Hunter"
1976	Baretta	Minnie	Season 3 Episode 3: "Runaway Cowboy"
1976	The Rockford Files	Margaret Raucher	Season 3 Episode 7: "So Help Me God"
1977	The Bob Newhart Show	Lady on Elevator	Season 5 Episode 19: "Death Be My Destiny"
1977	Eight Is Enough	The Waitress	Season 1 Episode 4: "Women, Ducks and the Domino Theory"
1977	Kingdom of the Spiders	Emma Washburn	
1977	Rafferty	Fran Milligan	Season 1 Episode 2: "Brothers & Sons"
1977	The Storyteller	Housewife	TV Movie
1978–1983	General Hospital	Alice Grant	191 episodes
1986	Moonlighting	Molly's Landlady	Season 2 Episode 11: "The Bride of Tupperman"
1988–1989	Days of Our Lives	Mabel	5 episodes
1989	TV 101	Secretary	Season 1 Episode 7: "The Last Temptation of Checker: Part 1"
1993	Point of No Return	Johnny's Mom	
