= Sticks Herman =

Herman Guidry, better known as "Sticks" Herman, (born September 1, 1935) was a Louisiana blues musician of the 1950s. He recorded for Eddie Shuler's Goldband Records, with singles including "Teenage Baby". The 1961 release, "Give Me Your Love" / "Lonely Feeling", on Tic-Toc Records was less successful.
