= The Honkers =

1972 film by Steve Ihnat

- film poster by Robert McGinnis
- Directed by: Steve Ihnat
- Written by: Steve Ihnat; Stephen Lodge
- Produced by: Arthur Gardner; Jules Levy
- Starring: James Coburn; Lois Nettleton; Slim Pickens; Anne Archer; Richard Anderson; Joan Huntington
- Cinematography: James Crabe
- Edited by: Tom Rolf
- Music by: Jimmie Haskell
- Production companies: Brighton Pictures; Levy-Gardner-Laven
- Distributed by: United Artists
- Release date: May 17, 1972
- Running time: 102 minutes
- Country: United States
- Language: English
- Budget: $1,500,000

The Honkers is a 1972 American comedy western film directed by Steve Ihnat and written by Steve Ihnat and Stephen Lodge. The film stars James Coburn, Lois Nettleton, Slim Pickens, Anne Archer, Richard Anderson and Joan Huntington. The film was shot in Carlsbad, New Mexico and released on May 17, 1972, by United Artists. The film was the film debut for Anne Archer.

It was one of several films set around rodeos made in the early 1970s, others including Junior Bonner and J.W. Coop.

== Plot ==
An aging rodeo rider thinks more of himself than he does of his wife, son, and best friend.

== Cast ==
- James Coburn as Lew Lathrop
- Lois Nettleton as Linda Lathrop
- Slim Pickens as Clete
- Anne Archer as Deborah Moon
- Richard Anderson as Royce Owens
- Joan Huntington as Rita Ferguson
- Jim Davis as Sheriff Potter
- Ramon Bieri as Jack Ferguson
- Teddy Eccles as Bobby Lathrop
- Mitchell Ryan as Lowell
- Wayne McLaren as Everett
- John Harmon as Sam Martin
- Richard O'Brien as Matt Weber
- Pitt Herbert as Haberdasher
- Luther Elmore
- Chuck Parkison Jr. as Announcer
- Larry Mahan as Himself
- Wiley McCray as Himself

== Production ==
Writer-director Steve Ihnat was an experienced character actor who had just written and directed a self funded feature film Do Not Throw Cushions Into the Ring.

Costumer Stephen Lodge wrote his first script with his new writing partner, Dave Cass. Lodge knew Ihnat from working on various television shows; the latter read it and asked Lodge if he would collaborate on a script about a rodeo rider. Lodge said "Steve’s agent heard that rodeo movies were going to be the next big thing, and that’s why he wanted Steve to write one. We didn’t know that there would be two others around town and made at the same time, J.W. Coop and Junior Bonner.” Filmink argued it was "one of several “modern day Western dramas” that popped up in the wake of the success of The Last Picture Show... Unlike Picture Show, which was about young people, they were all about middle aged rodeo riders who are sexually irresistible, and they all flopped."

According to Lodge, the first draft took four weeks, after that they attended a rodeo for research and did original drafts. The script was originally entitled Home Town Boy then this was changed to The Honkers after a slang term used to describe a rough bull. The script sold to United Artists and Levy-Gardner-Laven became attached as producers.

Ihnat wanted to play the lead role but the studio insisted on a star.

Filming took place in Carlsbad, New Mexico. Harry Vold’s rodeo company was used to stage the rodeos. Lodge said "We had a wonderful ending, originally, with Jim riding the yellow bull. This was after the bull had killed Slim’s character, and Jim goes and rides the bull late at night in the empty arena, until they’re both worn out. He faced it down. It was kind of our Moby-Dick, to have that passion of Jim’s character to beat that bull.” However this ending was cut.

Ihnat died of a heart attack in May 1972, at the Cannes Film Festival, shortly after The Honkers was released.

== Reception ==
According to Time, "Ihnat bears partial responsibility for writing this lackluster plot, although as a director he fares a good deal better. Unlike most fledgling film makers, Ihnat has an uninsistent and subtle style. He can catch the fleeting mood of a scene in a few shots, most impressively in a terse, brutal barroom brawl, and he has a good eye for local color."

== See also ==
- List of American films of 1972
