= Stephen Lodge (screenwriter) =

American screenwriter

Stephen Lodge (February 6, 1943 – February 26, 2017) was an American author, television screenwriter and actor; also a former costumer and stuntman to the industry. He was born in the Long Beach area of California, United States.

== Early and professional life ==
Lodge was the co-writer of the Kenny Rogers Western epic, the 1993 CBS TV movie Rio Diablo, co-starring Travis Tritt, Naomi Judd and Stacy Keach. His first major screenwriting credit was for the United Artists feature The Honkers starring James Coburn.

Soon afterwards, he was writing, producing and directing the film, One Block Away – this was co-written by Hoke Howell, who also acted in it. Another of Lodge's films, Kingdom of the Spiders, starring Star Trek's William Shatner, aired regularly on cable television in the 1990s.

Lodge grew up watching "B" Westerns, and his ambition from early on was to become an actor when he was older. He was able to visit movie sets as a youth, and was in awe of the experience. When he was 10, he was presented with an 8mm movie camera for his birthday. This encouraged him to write, direct and act in his own amateur productions. He started professional acting at 12 years old, and by the age of 16 he had appeared at Hollywood's famous Corriganville Western movie ranch.

When his time at college ended, he was employed by Columbia Pictures, where, among other things, he was an assistant to the associate producer on the 1963 TV series Camp Runamuck. He also gained media experience as a costumer for numerous productions, notably the classic 1963 TV series The Fugitive.

== Later life ==
Lodge lived in Rancho Mirage, California, near Palm Springs, with his wife Beth and their two dogs. Since moving to the desert he wrote, produced and directed a 90-minute TV special, Bordello; authored several articles for various magazines; and completed additional screenplays, including adaptations of his novels, Shadows of Eagles, Charley Sunday's Texas Outfit!, and Nickel-Plated Dream.
