= Stewart Bradley (actor) =

American film and television actor

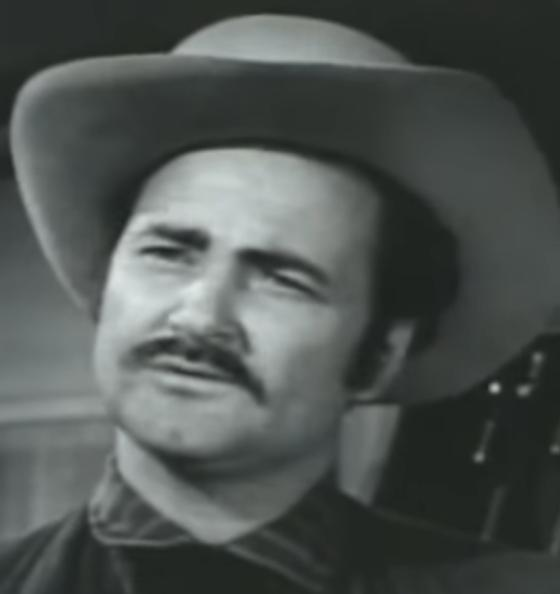
- Bradley in Frontier Doctor, 1959
- Born: James Francis Stewart; February 24, 1924; Brooklyn, New York, U.S.
- Died: December 22, 1995 (aged 71); Cambria, California, U.S.
- Education: Columbia University
- Occupations: Film and television actor
- Years active: 1949–1988
- Spouse: Yoko Stewart
- Children: 2

James Francis Stewart (February 24, 1924 – December 22, 1995) was an American film and television actor. He was best known for playing Lieutenant Danton in the American soap opera television series Days of Our Lives from 1967 to 1981.

Bradley guest-starred in numerous television programs including Gunsmoke, The Fugitive, Tales of Wells Fargo, Perry Mason, Rawhide, Have Gun, Will Travel, Bat Masterson, The Life and Legend of Wyatt Earp, Iron Horse, It's a Living, Death Valley Days, The Virginian, Land of the Giants, I Dream of Jeannie, Jake and the Fatman, Maverick, The Adventures of Jim Bowie, McCloud, Highway to Heaven, The Detectives, The Restless Gun, Man Without a Gun, The Millionaire and Cannon.

Bradley died on December 22, 1995 of a stroke in Cambria, California, at the age of 71.

== Partial filmography ==
- The Burglar (1957) - Charlie
- The Night God Screamed (1971) - Judge Coogan
- Cool Breeze (1972) - Captain Lloyd Harmon
- Another Nice Mess (1972) - Guilford
