= Up Jumped a Swagman =

1965 film

- British quad poster
- Directed by: Christopher Miles
- Written by: Lewis Greifer
- Produced by: Andrew Mitchell
- Starring: Frank Ifield; Annette Andre; Ronald Radd; Richard Wattis; Suzy Kendall
- Cinematography: Kenneth Higgins
- Edited by: Jack Slade
- Music by: Norrie Paramor
- Production company: Elstree (Ivy Films)
- Distributed by: Warner-Pathe Distributors (UK)
- Release date: 21 December 1965 (London)
- Running time: 89 minutes
- Country: United Kingdom
- Language: English

Up Jumped a Swagman is a 1965 British musical comedy film directed by Christopher Miles and starring Frank Ifield, Annette Andre, Ronald Radd and Suzy Kendall. It was written by Lewis Greifer and includes the songs "Waltzing Matilda" and "I Remember You".

== Premise ==
An aspiring Australian singer moves to London in the hope of a big breakthrough. He chases after a popular model, not noticing the beautiful daughter of a pub owner who loves him. He also gets involved with a gang of thieves.

== Cast ==
- Frank Ifield as Dave Kelly
- Annette Andre as Patsy
- Ronald Radd as Harry King
- Suzy Kendall as Melissa Smythe-Fury
- Richard Wattis as Lever, music publisher
- Donal Donnelly as Bockeye
- Bryan Mosley as Jo-Jo
- Martin Miller as Herman
- Harvey Spencer as Luigi
- Carl Jaffe as Analyst
- Cyril Shaps as Phil Myers
- Frank Cox as Wilkinson
- Fred Cox as Docherty
- Joan Geary as Mrs. Hawkes Fenhoulet
- William Mervyn as Mr. Hawkes Fenhoulet
- Gerald Harper as publicity Mman
- Gillian Bowden as dancer

== Production ==
The film was made when Frank Ifield was at the height of his popularity, and attempts to reproduce the success of Cliff Richard's musicals. Ifield's agent, Leslie Grade, suggested another one of his clients, Christopher Miles, as director. Miles was only 25 and had never made a feature film before. He said the script was to be written by the people who wrote Richard's musicals:

Unfortunately the two writers of the Cliff pictures were not then on speaking terms, so the two halves of a rather soggy script arrived separately in the post, and not surprisingly made no sense at all. So Leslie, not one to be beaten, got an old writer friend from ITV, Lewis Greifer, saying "He's the man, I know you'll get on well" which we did. However, thinking up a credible vehicle for Frank, amiable and charming as he was, proved to me that ultimately you cannot make a celluloid purse out of a sow's ear, even though Frank was gamely willing to send himself up. It was going to have to be a small budget, and to save money I was asked to use a new film saving invention as the dreaded 'Techniscope' process. By only using two sprocket holes for each frame (instead of the standard four) a narrow negative was created, which had a sort of wide-screen look. However, in 1965 colour film stock was still rather grainy, which showed when the final picture was blown up for the large cinema screen.

Miles also said the leading lady fell pregnant before shooting started; he replaced her with Suzy Kendall (making her film debut).

The film was shot at MGM's London studios at Boreham Wood, with exteriors at Gravesend Docks, St. Paul's Cathedral, Hyde Park, the Albert Memorial and Elstree town.

Annette Andre, an Australian actress living in London, was cast in the female lead. She called it "A very strange film. Good cast. Frank was nice, I was just never a fan of his singing. But he was pleasant. I was young enough to have fun with it. At the time, it was good work and I was thrilled to be doing it. "

Miles later reflected:

It was a baptism of fire but it taught me a lot about making a feature. It taught me that you cannot make a celluloid purse out of a sow's ear. You must get the script right first... Bunuel made musicals at one time and he probably destroyed the negatives by now. Like me, he needed the money.

A script for a follow-up Ifield movie was prepared but never made.

== Songs ==
Songs featured include:

- "Once A Jolly Swagman"
- "Look Don't Touch"
- "I Remember You"
- "I've Got A Hole In My Pocket"
- "I'll Never Feel This Way Again"
- "Cry Wolf"
- "Wild Rover"
- "Make It Soon"
- "Botany Bay"
- "Lovin' On My Mind"
- "I Guess"
- "Waltzing Matilda"

== Reception ==
The Monthly Film Bulletin wrote: "Christopher Miles' first full-length feature is an odd mixture of bizarre fantasy and pop reality. Not that either fantasy or the pop world are anything new to Christopher Miles, as those who have seen his short Rhythm 'n Greens will know. In this case it is not The Shadows who act out the whimsical products of his imagination, but that yodelling ballad-singer from Australia, Frank Ifield. And though he's not an actor, Frank Ifield proves himself a likeable enough personality. But likeable personalities don't make good films, and it soon becomes all too apparent that both the director's ideas and the techniques he uses to express them are second-hand. For the film turns out to be not so much a vehicle for Frank Ifield as a hesitant attempt to prove that anything Richard Lester can do, Christopher Miles can do better. ...The trouble is that whereas Lester's visual jokes are usually unforced, exuberant and part-and-parcel of his style, Christopher Miles seems to have planned his visual surprises so carefully to achieve the maximum comic effect that the jokes, when they come, are thin and forced. ...This is not to say that Christopher Miles' direction doesn't have its moments. "You've got to have a sound," Richard Wattis tells Frank Ifield, and as he opens his mouth to demonstrate, a lion roars on the soundtrack. .... Ken Higgins' photography sometimes catches the right off-hand mood, and Donal Donnelly and Ronald Radd add a little sparkle to a generally lifeless screenplay. And all ends happily with a communal rendering of "Waltzing Matilda"."

== Home media ==
It was released on DVD in 2014.
