= 1776 (musical) =

1969 musical by Sherman Edwards and Peter Stone

- Original Production Logo
- Music: Sherman Edwards
- Lyrics: Sherman Edwards
- Book: Peter Stone
- Setting: United Colonies, May 8–July 4, 1776
- Productions: 1969 Broadway; 1970 West End; 1972 Film; 1997 Broadway revival 2022 Broadway revival
- Awards: Tony Award for Best Musical

1776 is a musical with music and lyrics by Sherman Edwards and a book by Peter Stone. The show is based on the events leading up to the signing of the Declaration of Independence, telling a story of the efforts of John Adams to persuade his colleagues to vote for American independence and to sign the document. The show premiered on Broadway in 1969 where it received acclaim and won three Tony Awards, including Best Musical. The original production starred William Daniels as Adams, Ken Howard as Thomas Jefferson, and Howard Da Silva as Benjamin Franklin.

In 1972, it was adapted into a film, with eight of the original Broadway actors reprising their roles. It has received three New York revivals: on Broadway in 1997, an Encores! concert in 2016, and a 2022 Broadway production in which the racially diverse cast was entirely made up of people who identify as female, trans, or non-binary.

== History ==
In 1925, Rodgers and Hart wrote a Broadway musical about the American Revolution called Dearest Enemy. In 1950, another musical about the Revolution was presented on Broadway, titled Arms and the Girl, with music by Morton Gould, lyrics by Dorothy Fields, and book by Herbert Fields, Dorothy Fields and Rouben Mamoulian, the show's director.

Sherman Edwards, a jazz pianist and Brill Building pop songwriter who, decades prior, had minor roles in Broadway musicals, began developing lyrics and libretto for a musical based on the signing of the Declaration of Independence. Edwards recounted that "I wanted to show [the founding fathers] at their outermost limits. These men were the cream of their colonies. ... They disagreed and fought with each other. But they understood commitment, and though they fought, they fought affirmatively." He lived in close proximity to the Morristown Joint Free Public Library, which had in its collection an 1830-era publication of the letters of Abigail Adams and access via interlibrary loan to other letters Edwards sought. The first songs in the project were published and copyrighted by 1964. Producer Stuart Ostrow recommended that librettist Peter Stone collaborate with Edwards on the book of the musical. Stone recalled,

The minute you heard ["Sit Down, John"], you knew what the whole show was. ... You knew immediately that John Adams and the others were not going to be treated as gods or cardboard characters, chopping down cherry trees and flying kites with strings and keys on them. It had this very affectionate familiarity; it wasn't reverential.

Adams, the outspoken delegate from Massachusetts, was chosen as the central character, and his quest to persuade all 13 colonies to vote for independence became the central conflict. Stone confined nearly all of the action to Independence Hall and the debate among the delegates, and featuring two female characters, Abigail Adams and Martha Jefferson, in the musical. After tryouts in New Haven, Conn., and Washington, D.C., the show opened on Broadway at the 46th Street Theatre on March 16, 1969. Peter Hunt directed.

== Synopsis ==
NOTE: The show can be performed in one or two acts.

=== Act I ===
On May 8, 1776, the Second Continental Congress, convening in Philadelphia at present-day Independence Hall, proceeds with its business. John Adams, the controversial delegate from Braintree, Massachusetts, is frustrated because Congress will not even debate his proposals on independence. The other delegates, preoccupied with the rising heat, implore him to "Sit Down, John". Adams is frustrated that the Congress does nothing but "Piddle, Twiddle, and Resolve" as he imagines a conversation with his wife Abigail, who remains at the Adams homestead in Massachusetts and communicates by letter. Later, Adams meets delegate Benjamin Franklin, an elderly lecherous scamp, who suggests that Adams should let another, more popular delegate propose a resolution on independence and summons the charismatic Richard Henry Lee of Stratford, Virginia. Lee eagerly agrees to return to Virginia to procure an independence resolution from the Virginia House of Burgesses using his family's reputation and clout ("The Lees of Old Virginia").

Weeks later, new delegate Dr. Lyman Hall of Georgia arrives and is introduced to many important members of Congress, including Andrew McNair, the custodian; Stephen Hopkins of Rhode Island, an acerbic drunk; Edward Rutledge of South Carolina, the mysterious youngest delegate who leads the Congress's Southern caucus; and Caesar Rodney of Delaware, among others. As Congress is assembled, President John Hancock notes that the entire New Jersey delegation has been absent for quite some time. A gloomy dispatch from George Washington, commander of the Continental Army, arrives by courier and is read aloud by Secretary Charles Thomson. Shortly thereafter, Richard Henry Lee returns, bearing a resolution for independence. Elated, Adams seconds the motion to open debate on the resolution.

John Dickinson of Pennsylvania, a conservative and royal apologist, immediately moves to table the debate. The vote is close, but debate is ultimately approved, prompting Dickinson to denounce the desire for independence as an overreaction to petty squabbles with Great Britain. The debate becomes more heated and personal, sparking a physical fight between Dickinson and Adams and causing Caesar Rodney to intervene; Rodney collapses from cancer. Pro-independence Scotsman Thomas McKean escorts Rodney back to Delaware, leaving conservative George Read in control of Delaware's delegation. Read quickly seconds Rutledge's motion to end the debate and vote on independence, knowing it is likely to fail. At this moment, the Reverend John Witherspoon arrives, announcing that New Jersey's legislature has deposed its royal governor, Franklin's estranged loyalist son, and has sent Witherspoon as the new delegate with explicit instruction to vote for independence. Adams, now seeing a path to victory, pushes to proceed with the vote, since ties are broken by Hancock, an Adams ally who is also from Massachusetts.

Dickinson moves to require the vote for independence to be unanimous. The vote ends in a tie, but Hancock unexpectedly votes in favor of unanimity, reasoning that without a unanimous vote, any colony who votes against independence would be forced to fight on Britain's side which would turn the revolution into a civil war.

Knowing that Dickinson will quash the resolution if the vote proceeds immediately, Adams moves to postpone the vote to buy time to rally the needed support; he proposes that Congress draft a Declaration of Independence to build support abroad for the cause. Again, the vote ties; this time, Hancock votes to postpone. Before they adjourn, John Hancock appoints a committee of Adams, Franklin, Roger Sherman of Connecticut, Robert Livingston of New York, and Lee to draft the declaration. Lee informs the Congress that he has been appointed Governor of Virginia and departs, never to be seen again; Adams nominates another Virginian, the resident meteorologist Thomas Jefferson, who wants no part of the task as he is returning home to see his wife after six months. Jefferson is forced to accept the task after the other four explain why they cannot or should not ("But, Mr. Adams").

Adams sends for Jefferson's beloved wife Martha, reasoning that if Thomas cannot return to her, she can be summoned to him and potentially break his writer's block. When she arrives, she refuses to speak to Adams or Franklin and spends the night with her husband. Adams, alone, again exchanges letters with his wife Abigail ("Yours, Yours, Yours"). The next morning, Franklin and Adams again attempt to engage Martha in conversation; she speaks, but tersely, and talks of her courtship with Thomas ("He Plays the Violin"). Adams is delighted to find that Jefferson has written something, but instead of work on the declaration, it is a mere note asking for him and Martha to be left alone.

In June, with the Congress in what looks like a state of total lethargy, another grim dispatch from General Washington arrives, denouncing the Continental Army recruits as useless, undisciplined and outmatched, having fallen prey to numerous prostitutes at the camp in New Brunswick, New Jersey. Adams, sensing that Washington is exaggerating the crisis in hopes of securing more money, convinces Samuel Chase of Maryland to go with him to New Brunswick to test Chase's fears that the Revolutionary War is doomed to end in defeat; Franklin, eager to see the prostitutes for himself, tags along. The other liberals also leave the chamber; with only the conservatives left, and a cold front having brought down the ambient temperature, John Dickinson leads his congressional allies in a defense of their wealth, status and politics ("Cool, Cool Considerate Men"), during which the courier arrives with another gloomy Washington dispatch. The conservatives depart, leaving McNair, the courier (a Continental Army corporal from Watertown, Massachusetts), and a teenage "leather apron" (workman) alone in the chamber. As McNair begins a mock session as president pro tempore, he escorts the courier to Adams's seat; there, the courier and McNair discourage the leather apron from joining the Army as the courier recalls his friends' deaths at Lexington ("Momma Look Sharp").

=== Act II ===
As Congress reconvenes in Philadelphia, Jefferson is outside the chamber while Thomson reads the completed draft of the declaration to the Congress. Adams and Franklin arrive, delighted: though the troops are indeed undisciplined, they showed exceptional shooting skill hunting waterfowl for dinner, and this convinced Chase to vote for independence. They congratulate Jefferson on his work, and Franklin compares the creation of this new country to the hatching of a bird, though they disagree on what kind ("The Egg").

On June 28, Hancock asks if there are any alterations to be offered to the Declaration of Independence. Many delegates voice suggestions, additions or deletions. Edward Rutledge of South Carolina objects in particular to a clause condemning the slave trade. He fiercely defends slavery as an institution, claiming that blacks are not people, that Jefferson is a hypocrite for also owning slaves while opposing their trade (to which Jefferson claims he has arranged for his existing slaves' manumission) and the northern colonies profit off it via the Triangle Trade ("Molasses to Rum"). Rutledge leads a walk-out with the delegates from both Carolinas and Georgia, and the rest of the Congress follows. Adams, who insists on including the slavery clause on principle that excluding it would make the Congress hypocrites, discusses the matter with Franklin, who tells Adams that he must accept some degree of compromise if he wants the independence resolution to pass. Adams calls on Abigail in his mind to help him, and she reminds him of his commitment to the cause ("Compliments"). Bolstered by her (and the arrival of a delivery of kegs of saltpeter he had previously requested from her), Adams recovers his energy and sends McKean to Delaware to bring back Rodney, Franklin to try and win the support of Pennsylvania's James Wilson and Jefferson to talk to Rutledge. Re-reading a dispatch from Washington, Adams, now alone, wonders "Is Anybody There?" Hall returns; after considering the words of Edmund Burke, he decides to buck his constituency's loyalist preference and use his own judgment to vote Yea for independence on Georgia's behalf.

It is now July 2. Hancock calls for the vote on the Lee Resolution. At this moment, Rodney and McKean return to Congress to assure that they will out-vote Read. Thomson calls on each delegation. Although Pennsylvania passes on their first call, the rest of the New England and Mid-Atlantic colonies vote in favor of independence except for New York, who reluctantly abstains. (New York's delegate, Lewis Morris, explained earlier that the New York Provincial Congress had been so dysfunctional that he had received no instructions on how to vote.) When South Carolina is called, Rutledge again insists that the slavery clause be removed in exchange for the southern colonies voting in favor; after a brief but passionate final argument about the matter, Jefferson himself reluctantly strikes out the passage. South Carolina, North Carolina and Georgia all vote "yea". On Pennsylvania's second call, Dickinson is about to announce that his colony votes "nay" when Franklin requests that the delegation be polled. Franklin votes "yea" and Dickinson votes "nay", leaving the decisive vote in the hands of Wilson, who had previously subordinated himself to Dickinson; now, fearing that if he sides with Dickinson he will be remembered forever as the man who prevented American independence, he changes his vote to "yea." With twelve colonies voting in favor of independence, none against, and one colony abstaining, the resolution is unanimously adopted.

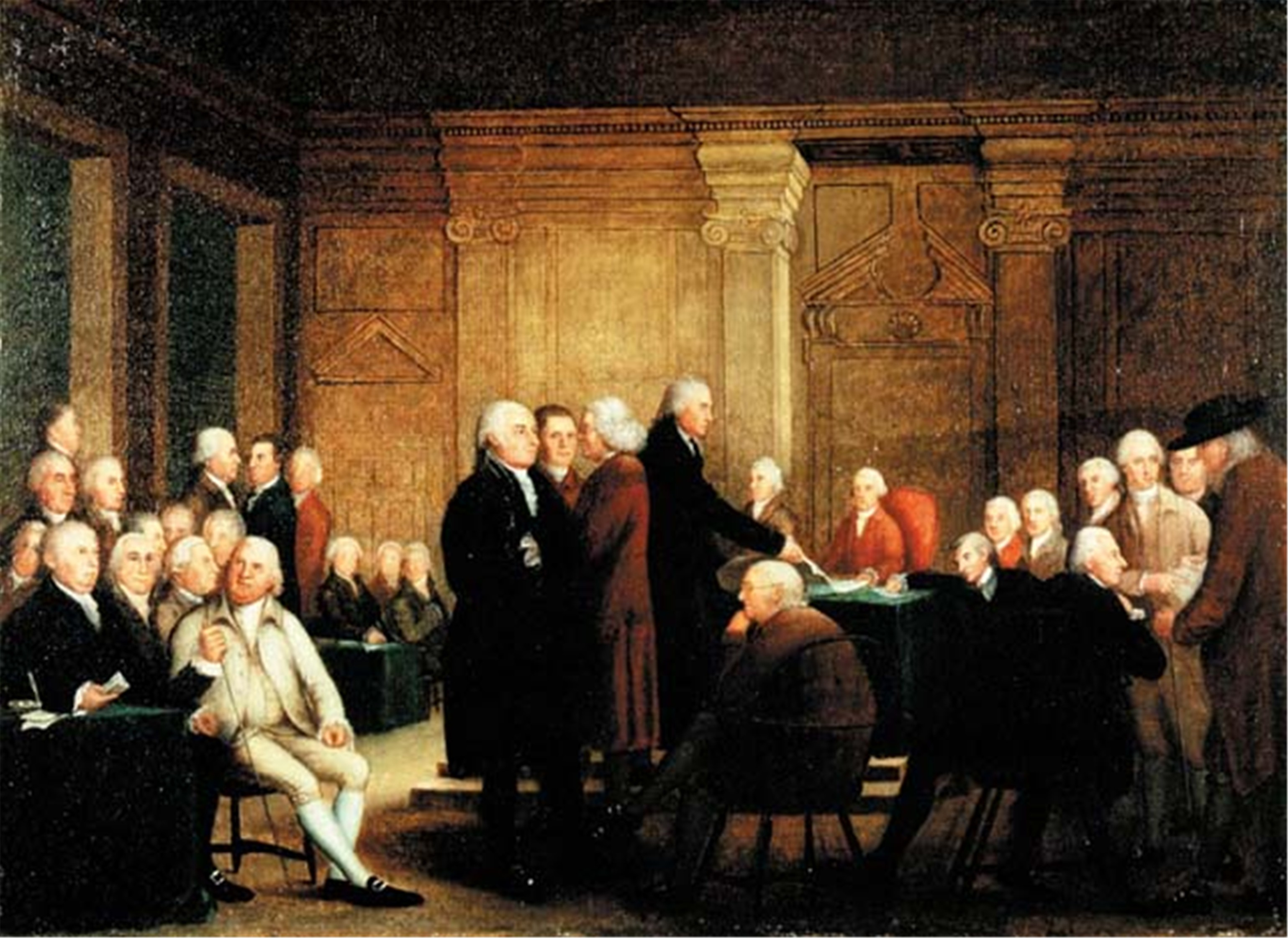
In the book of the musical, Peter Stone referred to Congress Voting Independence, a famous painting by Robert Edge Pine and Edward Savage, as a reference for how the actors should pose in the final moment of the play.

Hancock proposes that no man be allowed to sit in Congress without signing the Declaration. Dickinson resigns but pledges his loyalty to the new nation and says he will join the army and fight on its behalf, even as he hopes for eventual reconciliation with England. Adams leads the Congress in a salute to Dickinson as he leaves the chamber. The courier arrives with another dispatch from General Washington; on the eve of the British army's looming attack on New York, Washington remarks on the bravery of his outmatched band of misfit militia members. Washington also notes that Lewis Morris's family estate has been completely destroyed but that the Morris family was rescued and his sons joined the Continental Army. Morris, in response, announces "To hell with New York" and agrees to sign the Declaration.

On July 4, McNair is sent to ring the Liberty Bell. It is heard ringing in the background as Thomson calls one delegate from each colony to sign the Declaration, establishing the United States of America. The delegates freeze in position as the Liberty Bell rings to a fevered pitch.

== Productions ==
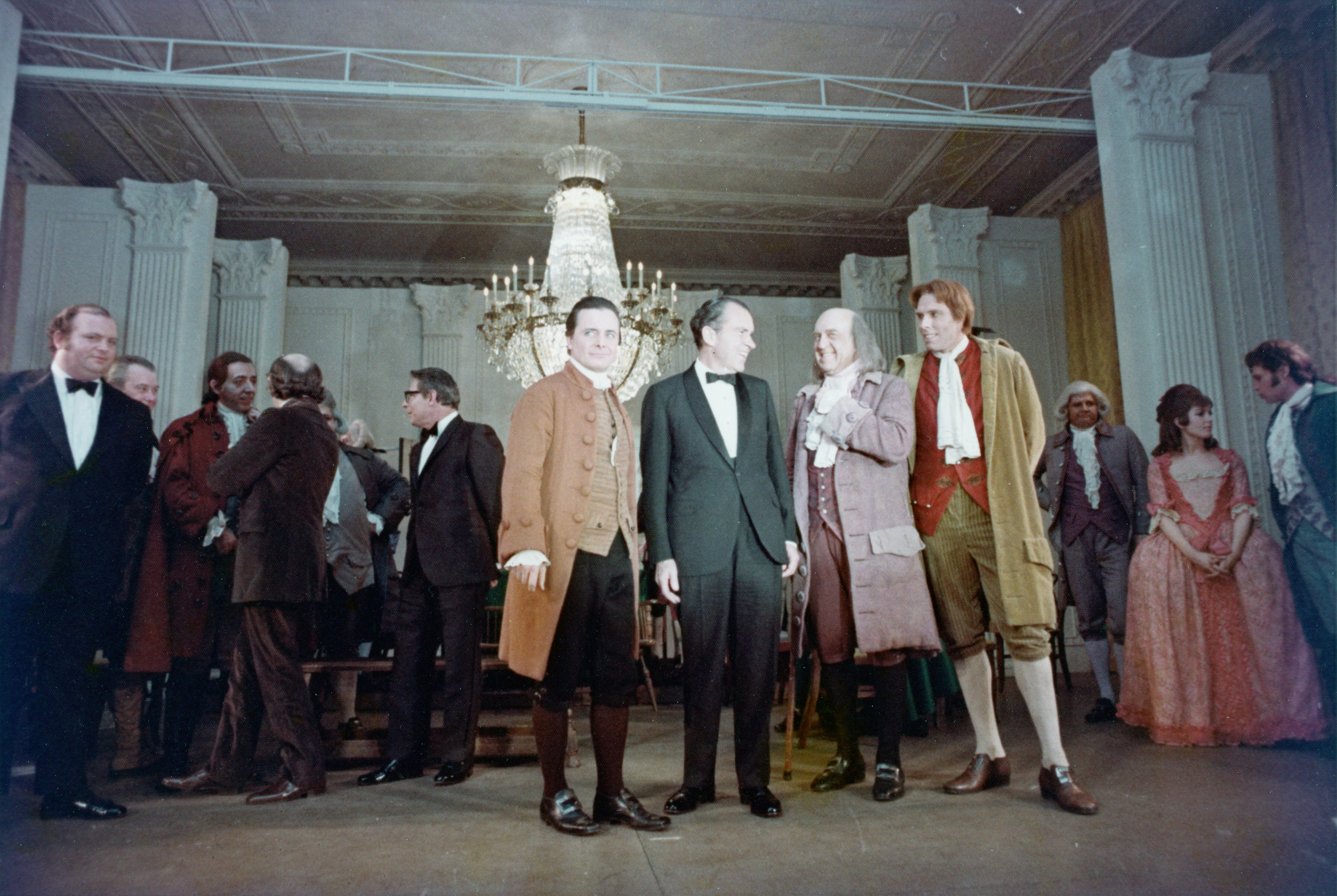
President Richard Nixon with the original cast of 1776 after a performance in the East Room of the White House

=== Original Broadway production ===
After out-of-town tryouts, the original Broadway production opened on Broadway on March 16, 1969, at the 46th Street Theatre (now the Richard Rodgers Theatre) and closed on February 13, 1972 after 1,217 performances. In its three-year run, it played in three different theatres: the 46th Street, the St. James Theatre (1970) and, finally, the Majestic Theatre (1971). The principal cast included William Daniels (as John Adams), Howard da Silva (as Franklin), Ken Howard (as Thomas Jefferson), Paul Hecht (as Dickinson), Clifford David (as Rutledge), Virginia Vestoff (as Abigail Adams), and Betty Buckley (as Martha Jefferson). Rex Everhart, who was da Silva's understudy, replaced him on the original Broadway cast album after da Silva suffered a mild heart attack, which required him to leave the show temporarily. Betty Buckley made her Broadway debut as Martha Jefferson in the original stage production. Clifford David left the production soon after opening. He was replaced as Rutledge by David Cryer who was in turn replaced by John Cullum who became one of the few Broadway replacements in history to recreate a role on film. (Cullum was succeeded in the Broadway production by Paul-David Richards.)'

The production received generally positive reviews. New York Post theater critic Richard Watts Jr. praised the musical as "a brilliant and remarkably moving work of theatrical art." In a mixed review, Associated Press drama critic William Glover faulted the first half, but wrote that it becomes "fine, rousing, imaginative entertainment, eventually."The New York Times dance and drama critic Clive Barnes reviewed it as a "most striking, most gripping musical". Also for The New York Times, Walter Kerr wrote:

1776 is, quite properly, the most independent new musical in years, and if you've got any character of your own you'll go to see it instantly, just to keep its independence company. [. . .] It really is about the American Revolution, seriously, playfully, plainly, preposterously. Wigs and all. In addition to having no title, it has no stars, not what the ticket agencies would call stars, anyway. And in addition to having no title and no stars, it hasn't got a chorus line. In fact, it hasn't even got an intermission. And it's just dandy. Just dandy precisely because it has a mind of its own.

=== First Broadway revival ===
1776 was revived by the Roundabout Theatre Company, opening on August 4, 1997, in a limited engagement at the Roundabout's home theater, the Criterion Center, before transferring to the George Gershwin Theatre on December 3, 1997, for a commercial run. It closed on June 14, 1998, after 333 performances and 34 previews. The production was directed by Scott Ellis with choreography by Kathleen Marshall, and featured Brent Spiner as Adams, Michael Cumpsty as Dickinson, Pat Hingle as Franklin, and Paul Michael Valley as Jefferson. Rex Everhart, who replaced Howard da Silva on the original cast album, was the standby for the role of Franklin.

=== Second Broadway revival ===
A new revival of 1776 was to be staged at the American Repertory Theater (A.R.T.) in mid-2020, under the direction of Diane Paulus (Terrie and Bradley Bloom Artistic Director of A.R.T.), and then in Los Angeles at the Ahmanson Theatre, before arriving at the American Airlines Theatre, co-produced by ART and Roundabout Theatre Company. The team held a two-week workshop on Zoom in April 2020, but the production was postponed due to the COVID-19 pandemic. In June 2021, A.R.T. announced that the production, now directed by Jeffrey L. Page and Paulus, would begin performances at A.R.T. in May 2022.

In April 2022 A.R.T. announced the revival cast of performers who identify as female, non-binary, and trans, and that the production would transfer to Roundabout's American Airlines Theatre on September 16, 2022 (where after previews it officially opened on October 6, 2022, and ran until January 8, 2023) and begin a 16-city national tour in February 2023. The cast (many of whom were making their Broadway debuts) included Crystal Lucas-Perry as John Adams, Patrena Murray as Franklin, Elizabeth A. Davis as Thomas Jefferson, Allison Kaye Daniel as Abigail/Rev. Witherspoon, Eryn Lecroy as Martha/Dr. Hall, Carolee Carmello as Dickinson and Sara Porkalob as Rutledge.

The show received mixed to negative reviews, with Jesse Green of The New York Times arguing that the revival was "so overpumped and overplayed as to be hardly comprehensible [as] the result of a fundamental misunderstanding of the musical". Green criticized the casting choice as one that "turns characters into cutouts and distracts from the ideas it means to promote." New York Daily News theater critic Chris Jones described the production as a "muddle of styles". Writing for Broadway News, Brittani Samuel wrote that it "further locks its subjects into binary stereotypes."

=== Other productions ===
The musical toured for two years in the United States and was given a London production, opening on June 16, 1970, at the New Theatre. The production starred Lewis Fiander as Adams, Vivienne Ross as Abigail Adams, Ronald Radd, Bernard Lloyd, David Kernan as Rutledge, John Quentin as Jefferson and Cheryl Kennedy as Martha Jefferson.

An Australian production, also with Lewis Fiander, opened at Her Majesty's Theatre in Melbourne on 26 June 1971 and moved to the Theatre Royal in Sydney on 11 September 1971.

The musical was produced in an Encores! City Center staged concert from March 30 to April 3, 2016. Directed by Garry Hynes, the cast starred Santino Fontana as John Adams, John Larroquette as Benjamin Franklin, John Behlmann as Thomas Jefferson, Christiane Noll as Abigail Adams, Nikki Renée Daniels as Martha Jefferson, Bryce Pinkham as John Dickinson, Alexander Gemignani as Edward Rutledge, André De Shields as Stephen Hopkins, and Jubilant Sykes as Richard Henry Lee. The cast included MacIntyre Dixon, Ric Stoneback, and Kevin Ligon reprising their roles from the 1997 revival as Andrew McNair, Samuel Chase, and George Read respectively. The production notably sported a racially diverse cast in light of the recent success of another musical about the Founding Fathers, Hamilton.

The musical was produced in Chicago, Illinois by Porchlight Music Theatre as part of their "Porchlight Revisits" series in November 2018. Directed by Michael Weber, Music Directed by Jeremy Ramey, with Musical Staging by Michelle Lauto.

A two-part radio production adapted and directed by Martin Jarvis starring Ioan Gruffud as John Adams, Alfred Molina as Franklin, Steven Weber as Edward Rutledge and Chase Fein as Thomas Jefferson was broadcast as part of BBC Radio 4's Drama on 4 - Story of America series, a major collection of dramatisations of milestone American titles marking 250 years since the Declaration of Independence, on 11 January and 18 January 2026.

The musical was re-produced by the Paper Mill Playhouse in April 2026, under the direction of Mark S. Hoebee with musical staging by Nancy Renée Braun. The cast starred Will Blum as John Adams, Michael Burrell as Thomas Jefferson, and John Treacy Egan as Benjamin Franklin.

== Original casts and characters ==
Character	Broadway	West End	First Broadway Revival	Encores!	Second Broadway Revival	National Tour	BBC Radio 4
Character	1969	1970	1997	2016	2022	2023	2026
John Adams	William Daniels	Lewis Fiander	Brent Spiner	Santino Fontana	Crystal Lucas-Perry	Gisela Adisa	Ioan Gruffud
Benjamin Franklin	Howard da Silva	Ronald Radd	Pat Hingle	John Larroquette	Patrena Murray	Liz Mikel	Alfred Molina
John Dickinson	Paul Hecht	Bernard Lloyd	Michael Cumpsty	Bryce Pinkham	Carolee Carmello	Joanna Glushak	Josh Stamberg
Edward Rutledge	Clifford David	David Kernan	Gregg Edelman	Alexander Gemignani	Sara Porkalob	Kassandra Haddock	Steven Weber
Thomas Jefferson	Ken Howard	John Quentin	Paul Michael Valley	John Behlmann	Elizabeth A. Davis	Nancy Anderson	Chase Fein
John Hancock	David Ford	Bernard Horsfall	Richard Poe	Michael McCormick	Liz Mikel	Oneika Phillips	Andre Sogliuzzo
Martha Jefferson	Betty Buckley	Cheryl Kennedy	Lauren Ward	Nikki Renée Daniels	Eryn LeCroy	Connor Lyon	Janine Barris
Abigail Adams	Virginia Vestoff	Vivienne Ross	Linda Emond	Christiane Noll	Allyson Kaye Daniel	Tieisha Thomas	Erin Bennett
Charles Thomson	Ralston Hill	Robert Mill	Guy Paul	Robert Sella	Mehry Eslaminia	Shelby Acosta	Gregory Harrison
Richard Henry Lee	Ron Holgate	David Morton	Merwin Foard	Jubilant Sykes	Shawna Hamic	Shawna Hamic	Richard Leacock
Andrew McNair	William Duell	Ritchie Stewart	Macintyre Dixon	Macintyre Dixon	Tiffani Barbour	Tiffani Barbour	JD Cullum
Stephen Hopkins	Roy Poole	Tony Steedman	Tom Aldredge	André De Shields	Joanna Glushak	Julie Cardia	William Calvert
Roger Sherman	David Vosburgh	Ted Gilbert	John Herrera	Wayne Pretlow	Brooke Simpson	Anissa Marie Griego	
Robert Livingston	Henry Le Clair	Alan Page	Daniel Marcus	Jacob Keith Watson	Gisela Adisa		
Thomas McKean	Bruce MacKay	John Moore	Bill Nolte	Larry Bull	Becca Ayers	Dawn Cantwell	Matthew Wolf
Dr. Lyman Hall	Jonathan Moore	Michael Napier Brown	Robert Westenberg	John Hickok	Eryn LeCroy	Connor Lyon	
Samuel Chase	Philip Polito	Harold Kasket	Ric Stoneback	Ric Stoneback	Lulu Picart	Lulu Picart	
James Wilson	Emory Bass	Richard Huggett	Michael Winther	Laird Mackintosh	Sushma Saha	Ariella Serur	
George Read	Duane Bodin	Kenneth Waller	Kevin Ligon	Kevin Ligon	Nancy Anderson	Gwynne Wood	
Caesar Rodney	Robert Gaus	Paul Bacon	Michael McCormick	Michael Medeiros	Jill Vallery	Jill Vallery	
Lewis Morris	Ronald Kross	Dudley Owen	Tom Riis Farrell	John Hillner			
The Rev. John Witherspoon	Edmund Lyndeck	Ian Burford	Jerry Lanning	Tom Alan Robbins	Allyson Kaye Daniel	Tieisha Thomas	
Josiah Bartlett	Dal Richards	Simon Kent	Michael X. Martin	Terence Archie	Sav Souza	Sav Souza	
Joseph Hewes	Charles Rule	Wallace Stephenson	David Lowenstein	Nicholas Ward	Oneika Philliips	Candice Marie Woods	
Courier	Scott Jarvis	David Firth	Dashiell Eaves	John-Michael Lyles	Salome Smith	Brooke Simpson	Jack Stuhley
Leather Apron	B.J Slater	Terry Mitchell	Joe Cassidy	Vishal Vaidya			

=== Notable replacements ===
Broadway (1969–1973)

- Benjamin Franklin: Jay Garner, Rex Everhart (u/s)
- John Dickinson: David Ford, George Hearn, James Noble (u/s)
- Edward Rutledge: Gary Beach, David Cryer, John Cullum, John Fink
- Thomas Jefferson: David Cryer, Jon Cypher, John Fink
- John Hancock: Charles Cioffi, James Noble
- Abigail Adams: Rita Gardner, Ellen Hanley
- Stephen Hopkins: Edmund Lyndeck
- Lyman Hall: Edmund Lyndeck
- John Witherspoon: Arthur Anderson
- Josiah Bartlett: Gary Beach

First Broadway Revival (1997–1998)

- John Adams: Michael McCormick, Richard Poe (u/s)
- Benjamin Franklin: David Huddleston, Rex Everhart (s/b)
- Abigail Adams: Carolee Carmello
- Caesar Rodney: William Duell

== Music ==
=== Act I ===
- Overture
- "Sit Down, John" – Adams and Congress
- "Piddle, Twiddle and Resolve" – Adams
- "Till Then" – Adams and Abigail
- "The Lees of Old Virginia" – Lee, Franklin and Adams
- "But, Mr. Adams" – Adams, Franklin, Jefferson, Sherman and Livingston
- "Yours, Yours, Yours" – Adams and Abigail
- "He Plays the Violin" – Martha, Franklin, and Adams
- "Cool, Cool, Considerate Men" – Dickinson, Rutledge and The Conservatives
- "Momma Look Sharp" – Courier, McNair and Leather Apron

=== Act II ===
- "The Egg" – Franklin, Adams, Jefferson, and Congress
- "Molasses to Rum" – Rutledge
- "Compliments" – Abigail Adams
- "Is Anybody There?" – Adams and Thomson
- "Finale"

In the 2022 revival, the end of Act I is moved to after "He Plays the Violin".

== Dramatic analysis ==
According to Peter Stone, Scene Three of 1776 holds the record for the longest time in a musical without a single note of music played or sung —– over thirty minutes pass between "The Lees of Old Virginia" and "But Mr. Adams", the next song in the show. On the DVD commentary, Stone says that he experimented with adding various songs in this section, but nothing ever worked. During this scene, dubbed "Big Three" by cast members, musicians were allowed to leave the pit, reportedly the first time in Broadway history that they were permitted to do so in the middle of a show. Stone also notes that people often told him that, because of the subject matter and the large amount of dialogue, 1776 should have been a conventional play rather than a musical. Stone believes that the songs create a playful, irreverent tone that helps bring the historical characters to life.

== Historical accuracy ==
According to The Columbia Companion to American History on Film, historical "[i]naccuracies pervade 1776, though few are very troubling." Because Congress was held in secrecy and there are no contemporary records on the debate over the Declaration of Independence, the authors of the musical created the narrative based on later accounts and educated guesses, inventing scenes and dialogue as needed for storytelling purposes. Some of the dialogue was taken from words written, often years or even decades later, by the actual people involved, and rearranged for dramatic effect.

The central departure from history is that the separation from Great Britain was accomplished in two steps: the actual vote for independence came on July 2 with the approval of Lee's resolution of independence. The wording of the Declaration of Independence—the statement to the world as to the reasons necessitating the split—was then debated for three days before being approved on July 4. The vote for independence did not hinge on some passages being removed from the Declaration, as implied in the play, since Congress had already voted in favor of independence before debating the Declaration. For the sake of drama, the play's authors combined the two events. In addition, some historians believe that the Declaration was not signed on July 4, as shown in 1776, but was instead signed on August 2, 1776. The authors of 1776 had the delegates sign the Declaration on July 4 for dramatic reasons. This particularly affects the scene in which Rutledge threatens to veto the resolution unless a clause condemning slavery is stricken from the declaration; this did not happen, though Jefferson later remarked that South Carolina was one of two colonies (along with Georgia) who had led opposition to the clause, and South Carolina and Pennsylvania were the last two states to agree to the Lee Resolution. The pro-slavery and anti-black views espoused by Rutledge in the play bear similarities to his record, though Rutledge had supported the Lee Resolution and led the campaign to convince the other South Carolina delegates to support it.

Of the four principal characters, the musical also notably focuses on Jefferson's wife, Martha, and Adams' wife, Abigail, but omits Dickinson's wife, Mary Norris, who was actually in Philadelphia, unlike the other wives, and was an active correspondent with the other Founding Fathers. Franklin's common-law wife, Deborah Read, was deceased at this point.

Central to the drama is the depiction of John Adams as "obnoxious and disliked," a comment based on one he made in 1822 explaining that Jefferson was chosen to write the Declaration of Independence due to his writing talent and Adams describing himself as "obnoxious, suspected and unpopular." According to biographer David McCullough, however, Adams was one of the most respected members of Congress in 1776. Adams's memories near the end of his life were, according to McCullough, likely distorted and affected by his troubled tenure as President in the late 1790s; no delegate described Adams as obnoxious in 1776. Historian Garry Wills earlier made a similar argument, writing that "historians relay John Adams's memories without sufficient skepticism."

For practical and dramatic purposes, the play depicts only 19 of the more than 50 members of Congress who were present at the time. The John Adams of the play is, in part, a composite character, combining the real Adams with his cousin Samuel Adams, who is noted in the play as being absent. Although the play depicts Caesar Rodney as an elderly man near death from skin cancer (which would eventually kill him), he was just 47 at the time and continued to be very active in the Revolution after signing the Declaration. He was not absent from the voting because of health; however, the play is accurate in having him arrive "in the nick of time", having ridden 80 miles the night before (an event depicted on Delaware's 1999 State Quarter).

Richard Henry Lee did not leave Congress to serve as Governor of Virginia, a post assumed at the time by Patrick Henry. In real life, he and his brother Francis were present to sign the Declaration, and his cousin "Light-Horse Harry" Lee, mentioned in "The Lees of Old Virginia" as a general, had only reached the rank of captain by 1776. Adams had more admiration for the "tall, masterly Virginian" Lee than the play initially implies.

Martha Jefferson never traveled to Philadelphia to be with her husband. In fact, she was extremely ill during the summer of 1776, having just endured a miscarriage. Jefferson rushed his work on the Declaration so he could return to Martha as soon as he could, and did so no later than August 1776, nine months before the birth of their short-lived son. The play's authors invented the scene "to show something of the young Jefferson's life without destroying the unity of setting."

The song "Cool Considerate Men" is anachronistic, not only because of its quotation of the not-yet-written "The Star-Spangled Banner," but because the terms "right" and "left" in politics were not in use until the French Revolution of 1789. John Dickinson, who is portrayed as an antagonist here, was motivated mainly by his Quaker roots and his respect for the British Constitution, having lived in England for three years in the 1750s. His wealth was matched by some members of the pro-Independence faction, and he freed his slaves in 1777; he also held views quite progressive for the era, including his views on women, which were shaped by the egalitarian Quakers and were a factor in the more socially conservative Adams's rivalry with Dickinson. Dickinson's opposition was in real life based on the chaos that had resulted during and following the failed attempt at an English republic under Cromwell in the 1650s and disputes over the Crown in the subsequent decades. (Dickinson would later draft the Articles of Confederation, a codification of the Continental Congress system that governed the United States until the present United States Constitution supplanted it,) Thomas Jefferson wrote of Dickinson that "his name will be consecrated in history as one of the great worthies of the revolution".

Joseph Hewes is portrayed as having little to contribute to the debates, only to consistently yield to, and vote with, Rutledge. According to Adams's recollections several decades later, Hewes in fact was staunchly against independence but eventually and reluctantly conceded to popular support once reconciliation appeared to be impossible. The North Carolina legislature had directed Hewes and his fellow delegates to vote for independence three months prior with the Halifax Resolves.

Thomas Jefferson is depicted as saying that he has resolved to free his slaves, something he did not do, except for a few slaves freed after his death 50 years later, due to the massive debt his estate incurred and the need to keep them on the books as collateral. Many of Jefferson's slaves, particularly the Hemings family, were related by blood to Martha (and, after Martha's death, Jefferson is believed to have fathered others); he fought to keep the family united and treated them with privileges rare for slaves of the era. Franklin claims that he is the founder of an abolitionist organization (the Pennsylvania Abolition Society); however, he had only joined said society in 1785, nine years after the declaration.

The musical misidentifies John Morton, the soft-spoken, experienced judge who cast the deciding vote in favor of independence solely to avoid the infamy of being the single vote that vetoed it, as James Wilson. Wilson had been cautious about supporting independence at an earlier date, but he supported the resolution of independence when it came up for a vote. Wilson had read law under Dickinson in his early career but was considered one of the leading thinkers behind the American cause, and had written the first arguments against taxation without representation in 1768; his only hesitation in supporting independence came because he insisted on receiving feedback from his constituents. Wilson was in fact one of the most outspoken political leaders of his era, as records tied to the later Constitutional Convention show, and would only become a judge after said Constitution was adopted. The desire to not singlehandedly block the independence resolution was a joint decision of all the Pennsylvania delegates; in real life, Dickinson and another delegate agreed not to attend the July 2 vote to allow Franklin, Wilson and Morton to vote yes on Pennsylvania's behalf.

The phrase "We are about to brave the storm in a skiff made of paper", placed in the mouth of John Hancock, was actually stated by John Dickinson ("Others strenuously assert...we ought to brave the Storm in a Skiff made of Paper.") in his arguments against independence.

In both the play and the film, John Adams sarcastically predicts that Benjamin Franklin will receive from posterity too great a share of credit for the Revolution. "Franklin smote the ground and out sprang—George Washington. Fully grown, and on his horse. Franklin then electrified them with his magnificent lightning rod and the three of them—Franklin, Washington, and the horse—conducted the entire Revolution all by themselves." Adams did make a similar comment about Franklin in April 1790, just after Franklin's death, although the mention of the horse was a humorous twist added by the authors of the musical.

Franklin's comments about the eagle and the turkey in "The Egg" were based on comments he had made in a 1784 letter he had written criticizing the Society of the Cincinnati for, among other perceived wrongs, using an eagle as a symbol. Furthermore, it was not Adams who chose the eagle as the de facto national bird, but instead secretary Charles Thomson. The bald eagle (Haliaeetus leucocephalus) was chosen as the national symbol of the United States in 1782, when the Second Continental Congress selected it for the country’s official seal. Congress formally confirmed the bald eagle as the official national bird when President Biden signed legislation on December 24, 2024, 242 years after it first appeared on the national seal.

The 2022 revival production includes an excerpt of Abigail Adams' March 1776 letter to John Adams, known for its "remember the ladies" statement for women's rights.

== Critical reception ==
John Chapman of the New York Daily News wrote,

This is by no means a historical tract or a sermon on the birth of this nation. It is warm with a life of its own; it is funny, it is moving... Often, as I sat enchanted in my seat, it reminded me of Gilbert and Sullivan in its amused regard of human frailties.... The songs and lyrics are, as I have indicated, remarkably original.

== Recordings ==
- Original Broadway cast (Columbia, 1969), available on LP, Cassette and CD with Rex Everhart as Ben Franklin because of Howard da Silva's ill health at the time of recording.
- Original London cast (1970), available on LP
- British studio cast (1970), available on LP (Marble Arch MALS-1327)
- Original motion picture soundtrack (Columbia, 1972), available on LP, Cassette
- Studio cast (The Ray Bloch Singers) (date unknown), available on LP
- Broadway revival cast (1997), available on CD, Cassette

== Awards and nominations ==
=== Original Broadway production ===
Year	Award	Category	Nominee	Result
1969	Tony Award	Best Musical		Won
1969	Tony Award	Best Performance by a Featured Actor in a Musical	Ron Holgate	Won
1969	Tony Award	Best Performance by a Featured Actor in a Musical	William Daniels*	Nominated
1969	Tony Award	Best Performance by a Featured Actress in a Musical	Virginia Vestoff	Nominated
1969	Tony Award	Best Direction of a Musical	Peter Hunt	Won
1969	Tony Award	Best Scenic Design	Jo Mielziner	Nominated
1969	Drama Desk Award	Outstanding Book of a Musical	Peter Stone	Won
1969	Drama Desk Award	Outstanding Design	Patricia Zipprodt	Won
1969	Theatre World Award		Ken Howard	Won
1969	New York Drama Critics' Circle Award	Best Musical	Sherman Edwards and Peter Stone	Won

*Note: William Daniels, who starred as John Adams, was ruled ineligible for the Best Actor nomination because his name was not billed above the title of the show. He was nominated for Best Featured Actor, but refused the nomination.

=== 1997 Broadway revival ===
Year	Award	Category	Nominee	Result
1998	Tony Award	Best Revival of a Musical		Nominated
1998	Tony Award	Best Performance by a Featured Actor in a Musical	Gregg Edelman	Nominated
1998	Tony Award	Best Direction of a Musical	Scott Ellis	Nominated
1998	Drama Desk Award	Outstanding Revival of a Musical		Nominated
1998	Drama Desk Award	Outstanding Actor in a Musical	Brent Spiner	Nominated
1998	Drama Desk Award	Outstanding Featured Actor in a Musical	Gregg Edelman	Won
1998	Drama Desk Award	Outstanding Director of a Musical	Scott Ellis	Nominated

=== 2022 Broadway revival ===
Year	Award	Category	Nominee	Result
2023	Drama League Awards	Outstanding Revival of a Musical		Nominated

== Film adaptation ==
The 1972 film version of 1776 was produced by Jack L. Warner with Hunt again directing and Stone writing the screenplay. The film featured William Daniels as Adams, Ken Howard as Jefferson, Howard da Silva as Franklin, John Cullum as Edward Rutledge, Ron Holgate as Richard Henry Lee, and Virginia Vestoff as Abigail Adams, all of whom had performed their roles on Broadway. The supporting cast was also mostly recruited from the Broadway production. The principal exceptions were Donald Madden and Blythe Danner, who took over the roles of John Dickinson and Martha Jefferson.

A Director's Cut of the original film has been released on DVD and Blu-ray. Both the look and sound of the original film have been improved through modern technology. Many cuts to the original film by the producer Jack Warner have been restored, including verses from the songs "Piddle Twiddle and Resolve" and "He Plays the Violin" and the entire "Cool, Cool, Considerate Men,” which Warner originally cut at the urging of President Nixon. Nixon felt the scene presented conservatism in a negative light. Musical underscoring has been removed from several scenes without songs in order to strengthen the focus on dialogue. Bonus material includes commentary by Director Peter Hunt and by Peter Stone, the book/screenwriter. Among other topics, they discuss artistic liberties and anachronisms used to dramatize the events.

== In popular culture ==
Throughout the course of the third season of the Netflix original series Grace and Frankie, Robert, played by Martin Sheen, and his husband Sol, played by Sam Waterston, are persuaded to audition for a local production of 1776 by the local gay men's theater group, resulting in Robert landing the lead role of John Adams, much to the disappointment of Sol who was not cast.

The musical Hamilton references the song "Sit Down, John" in a lyric from the song, "The Adams Administration", in the lyric: "Sit down, John, you fat mother—[BLEEP]er." Lin-Manuel Miranda discovered the 1776 film in college and cites it as having paved the way for Hamilton.

== See also ==
- List of the longest-running Broadway shows
- List of plays and musicals about the American Revolution
- Hamilton (musical), a 2015 musical about Alexander Hamilton
- Founding Fathers of the United States

== Bibliography ==
- Stone, Peter, and Sherman Edwards. 1776: A Musical Play. New York: Viking Press, 1970. ISBN 0-670-63657-6.
- Bloom, Ken and Vlastnik, Frank. Broadway Musicals: The 101 Greatest Shows of all Time. New York: Black Dog & Leventhal Publishers, 2004. ISBN 1-57912-390-2
- Kantor, Michael and Maslon, Laurence. Broadway: The American Musical. New York: Bullfinch Press, 2004. ISBN 0-8212-2905-2
