= Sit Down, John =

Opening number from musical 1776

Song
- Written: 1964
- Published: 1969
- Songwriter: Sherman Edwards

1972 film recording
- "Sit Down, John" on YouTube

"Sit Down, John" (originally published as "For God's Sake, John, Sit Down") is the opening number, written by Sherman Edwards for the musical 1776, a dramatization of the debate over and signing of the United States Declaration of Independence. In the song, John Adams urges the Second Continental Congress to vote for independence from Great Britain, but the delegates to the Congress repeatedly call on him to sit down. Adams, played by William Daniels in the 1969 original Broadway production and the 1972 film version, introduces the musical's irreverent tone toward the Founding Fathers. "Sit Down, John" influenced the composition of Hamilton, a 2015 musical in which Adams does not appear but in which he is discussed.

== Synopsis ==
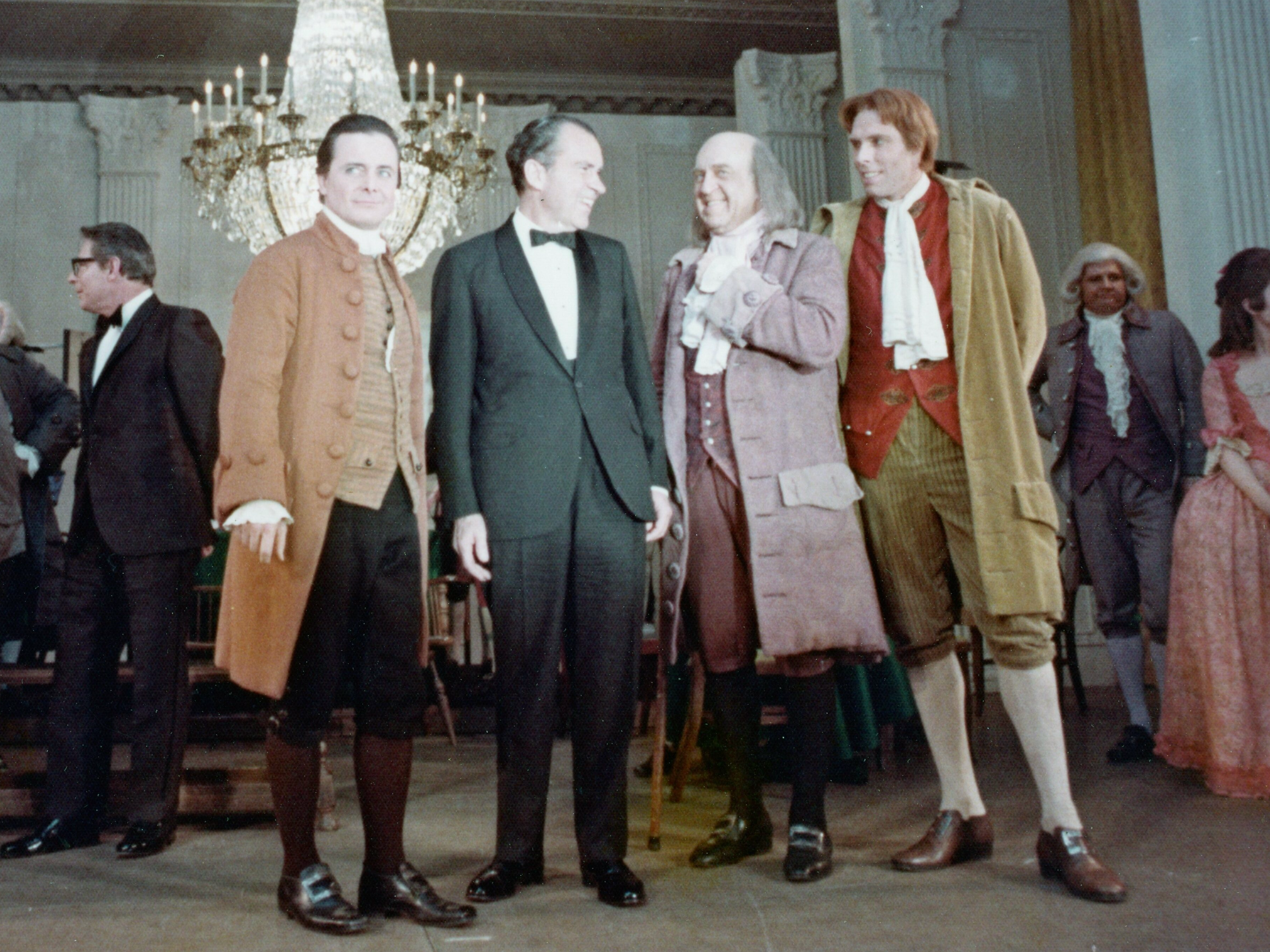
President Richard Nixon with the cast of 1776 after a performance in the East Room of the White House (Daniels as Adams, left)

The musical begins with Adams giving a speech alone on stage criticizing the Congress for its unwillingness to vote for the colonies' independence from Great Britain. The curtain then rises to reveal the Congress, who sing "Sit down, John!" In the number, Adams rises, arguing for the delegates to the Congress to vote for independence, while the delegates, distracted by the summer heat in Philadelphia and annoyed by Adams, repeatedly call on him to "Sit down, John!" and he responds "Vote yes" numerous times. This is interspersed with calls to open a window in the Pennsylvania State House to provide ventilation during the oppressive heat, which eventually elicits replies that the window is closed because there are too many flies in Philadelphia.

== Analysis ==
The song—described by Dan Dietz as a 10-minute operetta number in the style of Mozart—introduces Adams as a "ludicrous" foil to the more romantically portrayed Thomas Jefferson and contributed to Adams' portrayal in history as somewhat comical and crotchety. One scholar interprets the refrain of "Sit down, John!" as a sign of Congressional delegates' panic when considering the full implications of a declaration of independence.

Peter Stone, who wrote the book for 1776, said later that "[t]he minute you heard ['Sit Down, John'], you knew ... that John Adams and the others were not going to be treated as gods or cardboard characters, chopping down cherry trees and flying kites with strings and keys on them. It had this very affectionate familiarity; it wasn't reverential." Theater agent Flora Roberts—asked by Frank Loesser to take on Edwards as a client—said that, to demonstrate the musical, "he banged the piano and sang 'Sit Down, John,' and I got goose bumps.'' On the song's strength, she took him as a client and recommended he partner with Stone.

== Influence ==
The tone of the song influenced Lin-Manuel Miranda in the writing of the 2015 musical, Hamilton. "To begin an opening number with everyone telling another guy to shut up—what better way to pull these people that we see on statues and on our currency off of the pedestal? It's an extraordinary opening number," Miranda said. Adams does not appear as a character in Hamilton, but he is discussed. Miranda echoes the refrain of "Sit Down, John" in the Hamilton song "The Adams Administration", in which Alexander Hamilton raps "Sit down, John, you fat motherfu–".
