= 1776 (film) =

1972 historical musical drama film by Peter H. Hunt

- Theatrical release poster
- Directed by: Peter H. Hunt
- Screenplay by: Peter Stone
- Based on: the musical play 1776 produced on the New York Stage by Stuart Ostrow a conception of Sherman Edwards
- Produced by: Jack L. Warner
- Starring: William Daniels; Howard Da Silva; Ken Howard; Donald Madden; Blythe Danner; John Cullum; Roy Poole; David Ford; Virginia Vestoff
- Cinematography: Harry Stradling, Jr. A.S.C.
- Edited by: Florence Williamson; William H. Ziegler (supervising film editor)
- Music by: Sherman Edwards
- Distributed by: Columbia Pictures
- Release date: November 17, 1972
- Running time: 177 minutes (extended laserdisc cut); 167 minutes (extended director's cut); 165 minutes (director's cut); 141 minutes (theatrical cut)
- Country: United States
- Language: English
- Budget: $6 million
- Box office: $2.8 million (rentals)

1776 is a 1972 American historical musical drama film directed by Peter H. Hunt and written by Peter Stone, based on his book for the 1969 Broadway musical of the same name, with music and lyrics by Sherman Edwards. Set in Philadelphia in the summer of 1776, it is a fictionalized account of the events leading up to the signing of the Declaration of Independence. The film stars William Daniels, Howard Da Silva, Ken Howard, Donald Madden, John Cullum and Blythe Danner.

Portions of dialogue and some lyrics were taken directly from the letters and memoirs of the actual participants of the Second Continental Congress.

== Plot ==
John Adams, representing Massachusetts in the Second Continental Congress in Philadelphia, laments the body's refusal to debate his motion to declare the colonies' independence from Great Britain and instead to discuss more trivial matters. Disliked by most of his fellow Congressmen, he frequently seeks advice and comfort from his wife, Abigail. Benjamin Franklin of Pennsylvania, one of the few who enjoys Adams' company due mainly to their shared dream of independence, suggests someone else propose the independence resolution. Richard Henry Lee of Virginia eagerly agrees, and he rides home to get authorization from the state legislature to do so.

Lee returns, proposes the resolution and, over the objections of John Dickinson of Pennsylvania, leader of the Conservative faction seeking reconciliation with Britain, Congress agrees to debate the question, which becomes heated as tempers flare. Caesar Rodney of Delaware, suffering from cancer, collapses and is forced to leave during the debate, depriving Adams of Delaware's vote. A new delegation from New Jersey arrives and votes in favor of independence (Franklin receives word that his son William, the Royal Governor of New Jersey, has been arrested). Seeking to kill the motion, Dickinson successfully moves that an independence vote be unanimous on the grounds that "no colony be torn away from its mother country without its own consent." To salvage the motion, Adams asks for a postponement to draft a declaration of grievances. President of the Congress, John Hancock, breaks the tie vote in favor of a declaration and appoints Adams, Franklin, Roger Sherman of Connecticut, Robert R. Livingston of New York, and Thomas Jefferson of Virginia to a Committee of Five to write it. Despite his determination to go home to his wife, Martha, Jefferson reluctantly agrees to be the primary writer. After a full week passes without Jefferson's being able to complete the task, Adams summons Martha to Philadelphia; Martha charms both Adams and Franklin, and Jefferson finishes the draft.

To convince Samuel Chase of Maryland to support independence, Adams agrees to accept General George Washington's plea to visit the army encampment in New Brunswick, New Jersey, taking Franklin and Chase with him. After the members return to their lodgings, a young military courier arrives and sadly relates to Congressional custodian Andrew McNair how his two best friends were killed in battle at Lexington.

After Adams and Franklin return from New Jersey, the Declaration is read to the full Congress, which begins accepting many amendments. Jefferson agrees to almost all of the changes, except striking language referring to King George as a "tyrant" and objecting to slavery. Edward Rutledge of South Carolina leads the Southern members in walking out in protest just as Chase returns with Maryland's vote supporting independence. Frustrated at Adams's refusal to compromise, Franklin tells him that to achieve the primary goal of independence Adams must accept that those with opinions contrary to his will be part of their new nation. Badly shaken, Adams again seeks counsel from Abigail, and thanks to a delivery of much-needed saltpeter from her and a sudden decision from Georgia delegate Lyman Hall to support independence, Adams finds the strength and will to continue.

On the day of the vote (July 2, 1776), Adams and Jefferson agree to drop the slavery provision, and Rutledge and the other Southern states vote for independence. With Delaware divided, Rodney is brought back to support independence by majority vote of its three representatives. Eventually, all states vote for independence except divided Pennsylvania and New York, whose remaining representative, Lewis Morris, has abstained throughout the proceedings. When Dickinson rises to vote against the proposal, Franklin moves that the Pennsylvania delegation be polled: he votes for independence and Dickinson votes against it, leaving the question up to James Wilson. Not wanting to be remembered for casting the decisive vote against American independence, Wilson votes in favor. Dickinson resigns from Congress and vows to join the army to support the fight against the British, even though he believes it to be futile.

As the members prepare to sign the Declaration of Independence on July 4, 1776, Morris receives word that his estates have been destroyed and his family moved to safety. Despite not being authorized, Morris signs anyway. As McNair tolls Independence Hall's Liberty Bell, one member per state signs, establishing the United States of America.

== Cast ==
Delegates

An asterisk (*) indicates an actor or actress who was also in the original Broadway cast.

- William Daniels as John Adams (MA)*
- David Ford as John Hancock (MA)*
- Ken Howard as Thomas Jefferson (VA)*
- Ron Holgate as Richard Henry Lee (VA)*
- Howard Da Silva as Benjamin Franklin (PA)*
- Donald Madden as John Dickinson (PA)
- Emory Bass as James Wilson (PA)*
- John Cullum as Edward Rutledge (SC)
- William H. Bassett as Thomas Heyward Jr. (SC) (uncredited)
- Gordon De Vol as Thomas Lynch Jr. (SC) (uncredited)
- Nicolas Coster as Delegate (SC) (uncredited)
- Jonathan Moore as Lyman Hall (GA)*
- William Engle as Button Gwinnett (GA) (uncredited)
- Barry O'Hara as George Walton (GA) (uncredited)
- Roy Poole as Stephen Hopkins (RI)*
- Howard Caine as Lewis Morris (NY)
- John Myhers as Robert Livingston (NY)
- Richard McMurray as Francis Lewis (NY) (uncredited)
- Rex Robbins as Roger Sherman (CT)
- Frederic Downs as Samuel Huntington (CT) (uncredited)
- Peter Forster as Oliver Wolcott (CT) (uncredited)
- William Hansen as Caesar Rodney (DE)
- Ray Middleton as Thomas McKean (DE)
- Leo Leyden as George Read (DE)
- James Noble as Reverend John Witherspoon (NJ)
- Dick O'Shea as Francis Hopkinson (NJ) (uncredited)
- Fred Slyter as Richard Stockton (NJ) (uncredited)
- Charles Rule as Joseph Hewes (NC)*
- Jack De Mave as John Penn (NC) (uncredited)
- Jordan Rhodes as William Hooper (NC) (uncredited)
- Patrick Hines as Samuel Chase (MD)
- Andy Albin as William Paca (MD) (uncredited)
- Heber Jentzsch as Charles Carroll of Carrollton (MD) (uncredited)
- Daniel Keyes as Josiah Bartlett (NH)
- John Holland as William Whipple (NH) (uncredited)

Others

- Blythe Danner as Martha Jefferson
- Virginia Vestoff as Abigail Adams*
- Ralston Hill as Charles Thomson, Secretary of the Continental Congress*
- William Duell as Andrew McNair, Congressional custodian*
- Stephen Nathan as Courier
- Mark Montgomery as Leather Apron (uncredited)

Cast billing per on-screen opening and closing credits

- William Daniels
- Howard Da Silva
- Ken Howard
- Donald Madden
- John Cullum
- Roy Poole
- David Ford
- Ron Holgate
- Ray Middleton
- William Hansen
- Blythe Danner
- Virginia Vestoff
- Emory Bass
- Ralston Hill
- Howard Caine
- Patrick Hines
- William Duell
- Daniel Keyes
- Leo Leyden
- Stephen Nathan
- Jonathan Moore
- James Noble
- John Myhers
- Rex Robbins
- Charles Rule

== Soundtrack ==
1776
- Album cover

Soundtrack album by Various Artists
- Released: 1972
- Label: Columbia

1. Overture – Orchestra
2. "Sit Down, John" – John Adams, Congress
3. "Piddle, Twiddle and Resolve" – John Adams
4. "Till Then" – John and Abigail Adams
5. "The Lees of Old Virginia" – Richard Henry Lee, Benjamin Franklin, John Adams
6. "But, Mr. Adams" – John Adams, Benjamin Franklin, Thomas Jefferson, Roger Sherman, Robert Livingston
7. "Yours, Yours, Yours" – John and Abigail Adams
8. "He Plays the Violin" – Martha Jefferson, Benjamin Franklin, John Adams
9. "Cool, Cool, Considerate Men" – John Dickinson, John Hancock, The Conservatives
10. "Momma Look Sharp" – Courier, Andrew McNair, Leather Apron
11. "The Egg" – Ben Franklin, John Adams, Thomas Jefferson
12. "Molasses to Rum" – Edward Rutledge
13. "Compliments" – Abigail Adams
14. "Is Anybody There?" – Charles Thomson, John Adams
15. Finale – Orchestra

An original motion picture soundtrack album was released in 1972 by Columbia Records on vinyl LP records. It contains all the musical numbers, with the exception of "Cool, Cool Considerate Men" and "Compliments". The soundtrack also contains the edited versions of some of the musical numbers that were presented in full on the laserdisc and DVD releases. Although the Original Broadway Cast recording was released on CD in 1992, the film soundtrack remains unavailable in any digital format as of 2026.

== Production ==
Jack L. Warner bought the film rights to the musical for $1.25 million.

Many members of the original Broadway cast, including William Daniels, Ken Howard, John Cullum, and Howard Da Silva, reprised their roles for the film. Ralston Hill, Ron Holgate, David Ford, Charles Rule and others repeated their roles from the Broadway production, marking their only appearances in feature film. This was a decision Warner made himself after feeling he made a mistake by turning down Julie Andrews for the 1964 film adaptation of My Fair Lady in favor of Audrey Hepburn.

1776 was also the only film of Donald Madden, who was not in the original Broadway cast.

Exteriors were filmed at the Warner Ranch in Burbank, California, the former Columbia Pictures backlot, where they built an entire street of Colonial Philadelphia. Most of the Colonial sets were destroyed by a fire in the mid-1970s.

The water fountain seen during the musical number "The Lees of Old Virginia", with Ben Franklin, John Adams, and Richard Henry Lee, became known to television viewers as the fountain seen during the beginning credits of the TV series Friends. This fountain for years sat directly across the street from the Bewitched and I Dream of Jeannie houses, until it was relocated to the main entrance of the nearby Warner Studios lot.

Interiors were shot at the old Columbia studio on Gower Street in Hollywood. 1776 was among the final films shot at Gower Studios before the Warner/Columbia merger in 1971.

"Cool, Cool, Considerate Men" was cut from the film prior to its release and not included on the soundtrack recording nor on the first VHS tapes and laserdiscs. The Los Angeles Times stated "The song 'Cool, Cool, Considerate Men' depicts Revolutionary War–era conservatives as power-hungry wheedlers focused on maintaining wealth." According to Jack L. Warner, the film's producer and a friend of President Richard Nixon, Nixon requested the song be removed. He apparently saw it as an insult, as it suggested the conservatives were hindering American independence as they danced a minuet singing the song that included the stanza,

Come ye cool, cool considerate set
We'll dance together to the same minuet
To the right, ever to the right
Never to the left, forever to the right.

Warner's attempt to comply with Nixon's demands had initially been rebuffed by director Hunt during production, only for the song to be removed in post-production while Hunt was on vacation. Warner also wanted the original negative of the song shredded, but the film's editor kept it in storage unaltered. (The footage, some of physically poor quality, was restored for the DVD and Blu-Ray releases.) Trailers had already been released in theaters with the "Considerate Men" number as its centerpiece; Warner had those trailers pulled and re-edited. In a 2015 interview, Hunt mentioned that Warner, on his deathbed in 1978, told a friend that he regretted editing the scene, believing he had ruined the film's structure as a result. It was only decades later that the song was restored to the film.

When the Broadway musical was about to be presented to Nixon at the White House in 1970, before the film was made, his staff pressed the producers to cut the song then; their request was denied.

== Historical accuracy ==
According to The Columbia Companion to American History on Film, historical "[i]naccuracies pervade 1776, though few are very troubling." Because Congress was held in secrecy and there are no contemporary records on the debate over the Declaration of Independence, the authors of the play created the narrative based on later accounts and educated guesses, inventing scenes and dialogue as needed for storytelling purposes. Some of the dialogue was taken from words written, often years or even decades later, by the actual people involved, and rearranged for dramatic effect.

The film particularly omits the views of the mid-Atlantic Quaker population, represented by Dickinson. Although Dickinson is portrayed as loyalist in the film, and John Adams is seen making points of objection about the tax abuses of George III including regressive taxes and "taxation without representation", all to fund wars and the King's lifestyle, not to benefit the people, it was Dickinson's Letters from a Farmer in Pennsylvania that had originally made these points. A supposed physical fight between Dickinson and Adams is portrayed, in which Dickinson calls Adams a "lawyer" as an epithet, despite the fact that Dickinson was a lawyer himself.

Despite the film's inclusion of Martha Jefferson and Abigail Adams, Dickinson's wife, Mary Norris Dickinson, was the only spouse actually present in Philadelphia during the convention. (Franklin's common-law wife, Deborah Read, had died a year or so earlier. Martha Jefferson had suffered a miscarriage and was dealing with complications of gestational diabetes in Virginia.)

Another departure from history is that the separation from Great Britain was accomplished in two steps: the actual vote for independence came on July 2 with the approval of Lee's resolution of independence. The wording of the Declaration of Independence—the statement to the world as to the reasons necessitating the split—was then debated for three days before being approved on July 4. The vote for independence did not hinge on passages being removed from the Declaration, since Congress had already voted in favor of independence. For the sake of drama, the play's authors combined the two events. In addition, some historians believe the Declaration was not signed on July 4, but on August 2, 1776. Others note that the final copy of the document was signed by the delegates over several weeks and months, commencing in July and not completed until as late as September.

The Liberty Bell in 1776 is shown being rung as the delegates were signing the Declaration on July 4; however, Independence Hall's wooden steeple was structurally unstable, and the Liberty Bell was silent, having been lowered into the upper chamber of the brick tower. A smaller bell, used to toll the hours, may have rung on July 8, for the public reading of the Declaration.

Many characters in 1776 differ from their historical counterparts. Central to the drama is the depiction of John Adams as "obnoxious and disliked." According to biographer David McCullough, Adams was one of the most respected members of Congress in 1776. Adams's often-quoted description of himself in Congress as "obnoxious, suspected, and unpopular" is from a letter written 46 years later in 1822, after his unpopular presidency had likely colored his view of the past. According to McCullough, no delegate described Adams as obnoxious in 1776. Historian Garry Wills earlier made a similar argument, writing that "historians relay John Adams's memories without sufficient skepticism", and that it was Dickinson, not Adams, who was advocating an unpopular position in 1776.

The Committee of Five appointed to write the Declaration of Independence were: Franklin, age 70 (Howard da Silva was 62 at the time of filming in 1971); Roger Sherman, 55 (Rex Robbins was 36); Adams, 41 (Daniels was 44); Jefferson, 33 (Ken Howard was 27); and Livingston, 29 (John Myhers was 49). The lyrics of "But Mr. Adams" say Livingston claims to have "been presented with a new son by the noble stork" to avoid writing the declaration; no such son ever existed. Franklin's limited role in the drafting in 1776 is portrayed as the document being unfit for his pithy writing style; it was in fact because of Franklin's gout (which is mentioned in the dialogue), and his being homebound during June 1776 as a result, that his contributions to the committee were limited to letters of correspondence with Jefferson.

For practical and dramatic purposes, only 20 of the over 50 members of Congress present at the time are portrayed. This version of John Adams is, in part, a composite character, combining the real Adams with his cousin Samuel Adams, who was in Congress at the time but is mentioned as being absent in the script. Although the play depicts Delaware's Caesar Rodney as an elderly man near death from skin cancer (which would eventually kill him), he was just 47 years old at the time and continued to be very active in the Revolution after signing the Declaration. He was not absent from the voting because of health; however, the play is accurate in having him arrive "in the nick of time", having ridden 80 miles (130 km) the night before (an event depicted on Delaware's 1999 State Quarter) unaided, instead of with the help of another delegate. Further, Richard Henry Lee announces that he is returning to Virginia to serve as governor. He was never governor (it was Lee's ally Patrick Henry who assumed the post at that time); his cousin Henry Lee III (who is anachronistically called "General 'Lighthorse' Harry Lee", a rank and nickname earned later) did eventually become governor (and the father of Confederate general Robert E. Lee). John Adams was also depicted as disliking Richard Henry Lee, but according to McCullough, Adams expressed nothing but "respect and admiration for the tall, masterly Virginian." He did dislike Benjamin Franklin, contrary to what was portrayed.

Martha Jefferson never traveled to Philadelphia to be with her husband; she was extremely ill during the summer of 1776, having just endured a miscarriage. The play's authors invented the scene "to show something of the young Jefferson's life without destroying the unity of setting." Martha is also depicted as dancing a galop or polka with Franklin and Adams, dances not introduced until the 1800s. The real Martha Jefferson would have been seated playing the early piano Thomas purchased for her, accompanying him as he played violin.

The film, like its stage counterpart, misidentifies John Morton, the deciding vote and a soft-spoken judge who only votes for the resolution to avoid being infamous for killing it, as James Wilson. The real Wilson, though he had previously studied under Dickinson earlier in his career, had by 1776 become one of the most outspoken advocates for independence, and would only later become a judge on the Supreme Court. His patrician WASP accent in the film is misleading, since Wilson was a Scottish immigrant whose parents were farmers, while Morton's family was from Finland.

The quote attributed to Edmund Burke by Dr. Lyman Hall in a key scene with Adams is a paraphrase of a real quote by Burke.

The song "Cool Considerate Men" is anachronistic; the terms "right" and "left" in politics were not in use until the French Revolution of 1789. John Dickinson, who is portrayed as an antagonist here, was motivated mainly by his Quaker roots and his respect for the British Constitution, having lived in England for 3 years in the 1750s. He was no wealthier than some members of the pro-Independence faction, and freed his slaves in 1777. Thomas Jefferson wrote that "his name will be consecrated in history as one of the great worthies of the revolution".

The film also misses the objection some had to the Declaration's stated basis in "rights of Man" based in "natural law" derived from a supernatural being. The Quaker-based population in the mid-Atlantic, represented by Dickinson, objected to this conception. Dickinson's objection to the Declaration had to do with this, as well as the fact he and his base preferred civil disobedience to war as the means, and a view that the colonies were too immature and the egalitarian mid-Atlantic culture would be overruled by the slavery of the South and the patriarchal Puritan attitudes of New England, represented by John Adams, in the foundation of the new country. The film also omits the fact that Dickinson, after refusing to sign the Declaration, set about drafting the Articles of Confederation, which he based on "rights of Person" with no reference to anything but law created by human beings and the only reference to "men" being in the context of mustering armies. This basis was then used when the Articles were converted to the Constitution but by then completely omitting the word "man" and only using the word "Person."

The musical also deviates from history in its portrayal of attitudes about slavery. In 1776, after a dramatic debate over slavery, the southern delegates walk out in protest of the Declaration's denunciation of the slave trade, and only support independence when that language was removed from the Declaration. The walkout is fictional, as the debate over the wording of the declaration took place after the vote for independence on July 2, and apparently most delegates, northern and southern, supported the deletion of the clause.

The musical depicts Edward Rutledge as the leader of the opposition to an anti-slavery clause in Jefferson's original draft of the Declaration. However, while it is known that, according to Jefferson, the clause was opposed by South Carolina and Georgia, plus unspecified "northern brethren", that is all that is known about opposition to the clause. Rutledge was a delegate from South Carolina, but there is no historical evidence that he played any part—much less a leadership role—in the opposition to the clause. The musical does acknowledge the complexity of the Colonial attitudes toward slavery in the dramatic song "Molasses to Rum," sung by the Rutledge character, which illustrates the hypocrisy in northern condemnations of slavery since northerners profited from the triangle trade.

The musical depicts Franklin as claiming that he is the founder of the first abolitionist organization in the New World; the real Franklin did not become an abolitionist until after the American Revolution, becoming president of the Pennsylvania Abolition Society in 1785. It was actually Dickinson who freed his slaves in 1776, conditionally at first, and fully by 1787 when the Constitution was ratified.

In both the play and the film, John Adams sarcastically predicts that Benjamin Franklin will receive from posterity too great a share of credit for the Revolution. "Franklin smote the ground and out sprang—George Washington. Fully grown, and on his horse. Franklin then electrified them with his miraculous lightning rod and the three of them—Franklin, Washington, and the horse—conducted the entire Revolution all by themselves." Adams did make a similar comment about Franklin in April 1790, just after Franklin's death, although the mention of the horse was a humorous twist added by the authors of the musical.

James Wilson is portrayed as subordinating himself to Dickinson's opposition to independence, only changing his vote so that he would not be remembered unfavorably. In fact, Wilson was considered one of the leading thinkers behind the American cause, consistently supporting and arguing for independence, although he would not cast his vote until his district had been caucused.

The formula John Adams gives Abigail for making saltpeter—"By treating sodium nitrate with potassium chloride, of course!"—refers to various chemicals by their modern names, instead of the names used in the 1770s. A more historically accurate version might be "treating soda niter with potash."

Abigail's request for pins in exchange is not frivolous. Electroplating had not been invented yet: The common pin was subject to rusting and breakage, and so required replacement. At the time, pins were necessary for a wide range of crafts, creating garments and headgear (including wigs), making lace, ribbon and other trimmings and textiles. They also served the roles now played by paperclips and staples. Women used them as closures or to anchor pieces of clothing. (Hooks and eyes existed, but like so many manufactured goods, they had to be imported. The hook-and-eye industry was not established in the United States until the early 19th century.) The real Abigail, if dressed as in this scene in the film, would have supported the front lacing of her gown by using pins to fasten the fabric to the stiffened bodice beneath.

== Reception ==
Vincent Canby of The New York Times observed, "The music is resolutely unmemorable. The lyrics sound as if they'd been written by someone high on root beer, and the book is familiar history—compressed here, stretched there—that has been gagged up and paced to Broadway's not-inspiring standards. Yet Peter H. Hunt's screen version of 1776 ... insists on being so entertaining and, at times, even moving, that you might as well stop resisting it. This reaction, I suspect, represents a clear triumph of emotional associations over material ... [It] is far from being a landmark of musical cinema, but it is the first film in my memory that comes close to treating seriously a magnificent chapter in the American history."

More enthusiastic was Wanda Hale of the New York Daily News, who called it "at once an amusing and stirring record of fiery debates, stalemates and compromises of the Second Continental Congress trying to break colonial allegiance to the Crown before the revolution."

Writing from New York, Frances Taylor of Newark, New Jersey's Star-Ledger paper called it "the perfect movie for every one, no exceptions of any kind for any reason. You'll have to stand in line but you'll be glad you did and you'll want to see 1776 again, it's that great."

In The Boston Globe, Kevin Kelly called it "a faithful adaptation of the award-winning Broadway musical but, for some reason I find difficult to define, it lacks the stirring appeal of the original. I've seen 1776 now four times and it may well be that the repetition has worn grey my true-blue patriotism. The movie is a good technical copy but rather than adding to the original in any meaningful way it merely fills it out with the usual superfluity of second-hand screen work. If you haven't seen 1776 in its previous form, this perhaps won't bother you; if you have, it will."

Scott Cain of the Atlanta Journal wrote that he felt disenchanted by the earlier comic scenes, but liked its concluding sequences, and said that "for those who can stand it, 1776 has at least been handsomely produced by Jack L. Warner. The movie is beautiful visually. Peter Hunt has directed with a view to maximum expenditure of energy. There is absolutely no chance that anyone will go to sleep during 1776. Most of the actors were brought to the film from the hugely successful stage version and they all know how to milk a scene for full value."

Carole Kass of the Richmond Times-Dispatch stated that "the film, even though the conclusion is historical knowledge, is still suspenseful. One cares very much about the individual delegates and their votes, opting from the theater seat for freedom. The film is also a reminder that when it came to pitting the status quo against progress, Virginia was one of the first to vote for tomorrow. Edwards' music and fitting lyrics remain thrilling; the meat of the play still juicy, and its impact pertinent for those of any age or conviction."

Dale Perry of The Greenville News called it "a dramatic, delightful story [...] with style, humanity, wit and passion."

=== Philadelphia ===
In Philadelphia, the film opened to significantly different reactions across two of its daily newspapers. William B. Collins of The Philadelphia Inquirer called the film "an affront because it trivializes a big subject without any redeeming satirical intent. The Founding Fathers are not cut down to human size, they are reduced to subhuman dimensions. They are made into singing clowns whose boobish behavior somehow produces one of the most eloquent expressions of the human spirit ever to come from the hand of man."

On the other hand, Joe Baltake of the Philadelphia Daily News called it "a pompous, roguish, disarmingly charming movie musical. Its original freshness is retained largely because its 1969 Broadway ancestor never attained the household-word popularity of, say, My Fair Lady and The Sound of Music. Its storyline still comes across as something delightfully novel, as does its spirited score. Unlike other stage-to-screen adaptations, this 'new' entertainment is free of the usual telltale staleness. [...] Under director Peter Hunt's guidance, the off-beat material works surprisingly well in musical form. A heavy hand could have been disastrous. In fact, even with Hunt's light touch, "1776" occasionally gives way to a sluggish stuffiness. Some forbearance is necessary for total enjoyment. Sherman Edwards' unusual songs remain the work's high point, especially 'The Egg,' 'He Plays the Violin,' 'Sit Down, John' and the haunting 'Momma, Look Sharp.' Technically, the film is visually enchanting—a giant kaleidoscope of sprawling sets, period costumes and gobs of color. The production design is equalled only by the admirable ensemble acting. Each performer, from the witty Howard DaSilva as Franklin to localite Blythe Danner as dewy Martha Jefferson, offers a reasonably human characterization poignant, robust, but properly distant."

=== Chicago ===
The film got similarly mixed reviews in Chicago. Roger Ebert of the Chicago Sun-Times gave 1776 two stars and declared, "This is an insult to the real men who were Adams, Jefferson, Franklin and the rest ... The performances trapped inside these roles, as you might expect, are fairly dreadful. There are good actors in the movie (especially William Daniels as Adams and Donald Madden as John Dickinson), but they're forced to strut and posture so much that you wonder if they ever scratched or spit or anything ... I can hardly bear to remember the songs, much less discuss them. Perhaps I shouldn't. It is just too damn bad this movie didn't take advantage of its right to the pursuit of happiness."

His competitor, Gene Siskel of the Chicago Tribune, gave it three stars, conceding that the music was "forgettable" but stated that "if you are in the pursuit of happiness, 1776, the film of the musical stage play about our Declaration of Independence and the people who so declared, will provide it [... through] the majestic spirit of what these men are about."

=== United Kingdom ===
The movie received generally positive reviews in the United Kingdom. Alexander Walker of the Evening Standard said, "It ought to be heavy going and yet the surprising thing is I didn't find it so. The energy is infectious." He also stated that "since it was written into the record, 1776 could hardly ignore the moment when the reference to the slave trade was shamefully, but conveniently, struck out of the Declaration of Independence in order to carry the vote. Superfly [which opened in the same week in London] shows what the long-term result was."

Philip Strick of The Times wrote that "if 1776 does have its moments of charade, the film as a whole, adapted from the New York stage hit, is an unexpected pleasure: the traumatic, not to say indigestible events that led to the Fourth of July have been most acceptably converted into humor, charm, and energy. After this example, we should perhaps be giving more than passing thought to the show-stopping qualities of Magna Carta and the Domesday Book."

Arthur Thirkell of the Daily Mirror wrote that "on the evidence entertainingly served up in the new Hollywood musical 1776 [...] the British colonies in the New World might never have cut ties with the mother country but for the agitating Mr. Adams—a fine role for William Daniels."

It was not without its detractors in England, however. Derek Malcolm of The Guardian called it "a rather stagey and overweight rehash of" the musical, remarking that he "found most of the songs, and all of the frigging about that passes for choreography, completely amorphous—though there is one fine ditty about slavery and the North's hypocritical attitude to the South that's a notable exception." He concluded his review by saying that "perhaps because one does eventually get used to the stylized, uncinematic presentation, perhaps because the argument grows genuinely tense and informative, I was held by the last hour so. But that leaves the first 70 minutes unaccounted for, and one can hardly recommend patrons to walk in halfway through."

George Melly of The Observer said "the film isn't boring, or at least I didn't fond it so, and for those, like me, who know regrettably little early American history, it's even instructive; but it is very bland, the carefully tailored image of what America hopes it's like, with even its flaws shown in such a light as to appear virtues."

Michael Billington of The Birmingham Post commented, "I never saw the American musical, 1776, on the stage: but I feel as if I had for the now film version is one of those rare ventures that preserves intact virtually the entire Broadway cast and makes little attempt to open out the action. I only wish I could say this fidelity to the original concept actually worked, but the fact is you have to keep pinching yourself to remember that you're watching movie. A pity because the material itself has great fascination: in fact, I can't think of any other musical that adds to one's stock of factual information."

=== Rotten Tomatoes ===
On Rotten Tomatoes, the film has a 68% score, based on 19 reviews, with an average rating of 7.1/10.

=== Box office ===
The film was the Christmas attraction at Radio City Music Hall in New York City and performed very well, grossing $1,743,978 in its first six weeks. It did not perform as well in its other opening engagements in Philadelphia, Boston and Washington. It returned to the Music Hall for two weeks starting June 3, 1976 in honor of the United States Bicentennial.

=== Accolades ===
The film was nominated for the Golden Globe Award for Best Motion Picture – Musical or Comedy but lost to Cabaret. Harry Stradling Jr. was nominated for the Academy Award for Best Cinematography but lost to Geoffrey Unsworth for Cabaret.

The film is recognized by American Film Institute in these lists:

- 2006: AFI's Greatest Movie Musicals – Nominated

== Home media ==
The film was first released on videocassette, which runs 148 minutes, and on Laserdisc in the 1980s. The Laserdisc version runs 180 minutes and is rated PG.

The DVD, issued in 2002 as a "Restored Director's Cut", runs 165 minutes. It trims up some scenes and contains previously unreleased scenes, including the "Cool, Cool Considerate Men" musical number and accompanying dialogue. However, it excludes the previously released Overture (heard on laserdisc but not in cinemas).

The film was released on Blu-ray from a 4K-master on June 2, 2015. It contains two commentaries: an all-new commentary, with director Hunt, Daniels and Howard, and also the DVD commentary with Hunt and Peter Stone only. With two versions: the prior "Director's Cut", and a further "extended cut" (167 minutes), the release also includes two deleted and alternative scenes with filmmaker commentary, screen tests, and original theatrical trailers.

On May 31, 2022, Sony Pictures released a three-disc 50th anniversary Blu-ray. The release includes four different cuts: the two major 165-minute and 167-minute versions (from the 2015 DVD release), on 4K with a Dolby Atmos soundtrack, and on a third, bonus Blu-ray disc, the original 148-minute 1972 theatrical cut that was previously only available on VHS (now in HD with the original mono soundtrack) and the 180-minute 1992 LaserDisc release (in SD with stereo soundtrack) (both on Blu-ray for the first time).

== Comic book adaptation ==
- Charlton Comics: 1776 (March 1973):

== See also ==
- List of American films of 1972
- List of films about the American Revolution
  - Declaration of Independence, 1938 Academy Award winning short film
- List of television series and miniseries about the American Revolution
- Founding Fathers of the United States
