= Andrew McNair =

Andrew McNair may refer to:

- Andrew McNair (custodian), custodian who served the Continental Congress and official ringer of the Liberty Bell
- Andrew McNair (actor) (born 1979), English actor
