= William Duell =

American actor (1923–2011)

- Born: George William Duell; August 30, 1923; Corinth, New York, U.S.
- Died: December 22, 2011 (aged 88); Manhattan, New York, U.S.
- Other names: Darwin William Duell (name legally changed during childhood)
- Occupations: Film actor; Singer; TV actor; Stage actor
- Years active: 1961–2003
- Spouse: Mary Barto (m. 2004)

Darwin William Duell (born George William Duell; August 30, 1923 – December 22, 2011) was an American actor and singer. He was known for his roles as Andrew McNair in the musical 1776, Jim Sefelt in the 1975 film One Flew Over the Cuckoo's Nest, and Johnny the Shoe Shine Guy in the 1982 crime comedy series Police Squad!. Described as a short, odd-looking character actor with a Shakespearean background, he had many minor roles in plays, films and TV series. His last work was a cameo in the 2003 film How to Lose a Guy in 10 Days.

== Early life and career ==
Duell was born in 1923 in Corinth, New York, to E. Janet (Harrington) and Leon George Duell, an employee of the International Paper Company. Sometime in his youth, his mother legally changed his name to Darwin William Duell. Duell never cared for his first name and thus always went by his middle name, William. Duell graduated from Green Mountain Junior College (Vermont), Illinois Wesleyan University, and Yale University. A theater scholarship at Green Mountain College was named after him. Duell served in the U.S. Navy during World War II.

He portrayed Congressional custodian Andrew McNair in the Broadway version of 1776, which made him the one actor who stayed throughout the entire run of the show and was never understudied; he also played the part in the 1972 film of the musical. In the 1997 Broadway revival of 1776, Duell was a replacement member of the cast, filling the role of Caesar Rodney after Michael McCormick took on the role of John Adams. In 2010, he appeared in a one-night only staged reading of Evening Primrose by Stephen Sondheim.

== Later life and death ==
Duell married his wife, Mary Barto, in 2004. Duell died of respiratory failure in December 2011. He was 88.

== Partial filmography ==
- The Hustler (1961) – Billy (Louisville Hustler) (uncredited)
- 1776 (1972) – Andrew McNair, Congressional Custodian
- Deadhead Miles (1973) – Auto Parts Salesman
- Law and Disorder (1974)
- The Happy Hooker (1975) – Meek Man
- One Flew Over the Cuckoo's Nest (1975) – Jim Sefelt
- King of the Gypsies (1978) – Funeral Home Director
- My Old Man (1979) – Rooster
- Airplane! (1980) – Reporter #1 (uncredited)
- A Stranger Is Watching (1982) – Derelict in Subway (uncredited)
- Police Squad! (1982) – Johnny
- Without a Trace (1983) – Polygraph operator
- Grace Quigley (1984) – Mr. Harvey Jenkins
- The Pope of Greenwich Village (1984) – Toll Booth Attendant #2
- Mrs. Soffel (1984) – Lenny
- The Beniker Gang (1985) – Postmaster Greaves
- Seize the Day (1986) – Joey
- Ironweed (1987) – Moose
- Funny Farm (1988) – Old Character
- Elvira, Mistress of the Dark (1988) – Lesley Meeker
- Out of the Rain (1991) – Reverend
- Me and Veronica (1993) – Harry
- Trial by Jury (1994) – Jimmy
- Palookaville (1995) – Money Truck Guard
- Reckless (1995) – Roy
- In & Out (1997) – Emmett Wilson
- The Out-of-Towners (1999) – Lost Baggage Clerk
- Cradle Will Rock (1999) – Butler
- Advice from a Caterpillar (1999) – Hunter #2
- How to Lose a Guy in 10 Days (2003) – Old Concession Worker (final film role)
