= Ralston Hill =

American actor

- Born: April 24, 1927; Cleveland, Ohio
- Died: October 19, 1996 (aged 69); New Jersey
- Occupations: Stage, film actor

Ralston Hill (April 24, 1927 – October 19, 1996) was an American stage actor and singer who had several roles on Broadway, most notably Congressional Secretary Charles Thomson in the musical 1776. His only film credit is that same role in the 1972 film adaptation of the musical.

Hill was born Richard Ralston Hill in Cleveland, Ohio and raised in Oberlin, Ohio, where he graduated Oberlin High School in 1945. He attended the University of Missouri and then Oberlin College, graduating in 1950. He next attended the American Theater Wing School in New York City until 1952 and immediately began to perform in summer stock theatre in Florida. In addition to his roles on Broadway, he played various roles Off-Broadway and in regional theatre, often in musicals. He toured with Frances Langford, Martyn Green's Gilbert and Sullivan company, National Repertory Theatre, Ford's Theater, the Virginia City Players of Montana, and in dinner theaters throughout the country. He played several roles at the North Shore Music Theatre. In 1990, he began a year and a half long national tour of The Fantasticks playing Hucklebee alongside Robert Goulet as El Gallo and James Valentine as Henry.

His only film role was in the 1972 version of the Broadway musical, 1776. He reprised his role as Secretary Charles Thomson, which he performed as one of the original Broadway cast members.

He died in New Jersey at the age of 69 while rehearsing for Gigi at the Paper Mill Playhouse and is buried in Westwood Cemetery in Oberlin, Ohio.

== Selected plays ==
- The Young Abe Lincoln (1961, Broadway)
- The Streets of New York (1963, original Off-Broadway production)
- The Changeling
- God Bless You Mr. Rosewater
- No Strings
- Carousel (Lincoln Center Revival, 1965)
- 1776 (1969, Broadway)
- West Side Story
- The Desert Song
- John Brown's Body
- Oliver!
- The Most Happy Fella
- H.M.S. Pinafore
- The Pirates of Penzance
- The Mikado
- The Comedy of Errors
- Candide
- Valmouth
- The Beggar's Opera
- Woman of the Year (1981, Broadway)
- The Fantasticks (National Tour, 1990–91)
