= Dorothy Collins =

American singer

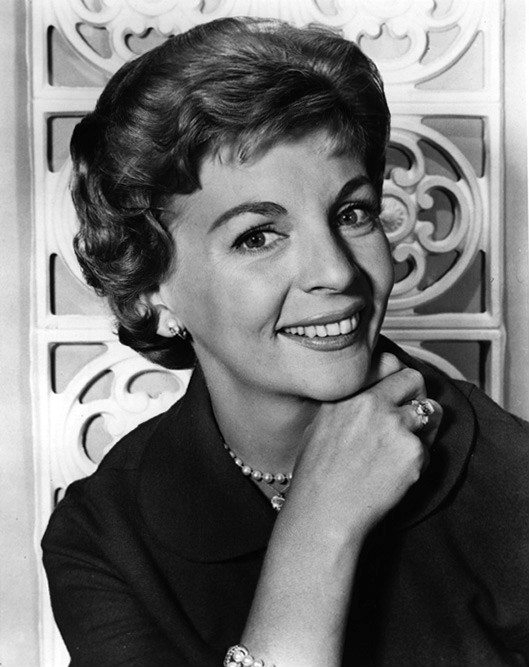
- Dorothy Collins, 1960s
- Born: Marjorie Chandler; November 18, 1926; Windsor, Ontario, Canada
- Died: July 21, 1994 (aged 67); Watervliet, New York, U.S.
- Occupations: Actress, singer
- Years active: 1942–1980
- Spouse(s): Raymond Scott (1952–1965; divorce); 2 children Ron Holgate (1966–1977; divorce); 1 child

Dorothy Collins (born Marjorie Chandler; November 18, 1926 – July 21, 1994) was a Canadian-American singer, actress, and recording artist.

== Radio and TV ==
Collins was born in Windsor, Ontario, Canada, and adopted her stage name in her mid-teens. As a youngster, she sang on radio stations in Windsor and Detroit. In 1940, at age 14, she and her family were introduced to bandleader/composer Raymond Scott in Chicago. Shortly thereafter, she became Scott's protégée. In early 1942, at age 15, she became a featured vocalist with Scott's orchestra, performing on radio and on tour. Scott groomed her for stardom, which included coaching her vocals (pitch, phrasing, and delivery) and mentoring her performance skills. In the late 1940s, she contributed vocals to the revived Raymond Scott Quintette, a sextet that released records on the bandleader's own Master label and served as house band on the radio program Herb Shriner Time. In 1949, after Scott was hired to conduct the orchestra on the popular CBS Radio program, Lucky Strike's Your Hit Parade, Collins was trained by Scott to lead his sextet on tour in his absence.

In 1950, Your Hit Parade moved to NBC television, with Scott retained as conductor. Shortly thereafter, at Scott's urging, Collins auditioned for a vocalist slot and was hired. She shot to nationwide fame as one of the show's featured vocalists, singing—and acting in costume—in sketches dramatizing popular songs of the day. After her absence from Your Hit Parade during the 1957–58 season (a new cast of singers replaced Collins and her fellow vocalists), Collins returned for the series' final season on CBS Television ending in April 1959.

Collins often appeared as spokeswoman/vocalist in Lucky Strike cigarette commercials during the program and on their other sponsored series (including the Jack Benny radio show) via transcription disc, earning the title, "The Sweetheart of Lucky Strike". She made television history as the first performer to appear on videotape. The recording format was first introduced in a Collins musical segment on the October 23, 1956 episode of NBC's The Jonathan Winters Show. Her additional TV credits include The Steve Allen Show, The Bell Telephone Hour, and The Hollywood Palace. From 1961 to 1963 she was co-host and stunt participant on CBS-TV's Candid Camera with Durward Kirby and series creator Allen Funt. In 1961 she occasionally guest-hosted a short-lived Carol Burnett and Richard Hayes CBS Radio Network show.

== Recording and concerts ==
In 1955, her single "My Boy – Flat Top, " reached No. 16 on the Billboard charts. A follow-up single, "Baciare Baciare (Kissing Kissing)", peaked at No. 43. In 1956, her single "Seven Days" peaked at No. 17. She recorded other singles and albums in the 1950s, with little chart success. In 1958, for the Coral Records label she released Picnic: Dorothy Collins Sings Steve Allen, an album of compositions by the musician/TV host/comedian. Collins sang a collection of educational tunes on an album titled Experiment Songs, one of six LPs in a set called Ballads for the Age of Science, composed and produced by Hy Zaret and Lou Singer around 1960.

During the 1950s and '60s, Collins provided vocals for many TV and radio commercials produced and recorded by Raymond Scott's Jingle Workshop. A number of these performances were issued in 2019 on the double album The Jingle Workshop: Midcentury Musical Miniatures 1951–1965, on the Modern Harmonic label.

In 1979, she performed in concert at Michael's Pub in New York.

== Theatre ==
In the summer of 1957 she played Dorothy Gale in The Municipal Opera Association of St. Louis production of The Wizard of Oz, alongside Margaret Hamilton reprising her movie role of the Wicked Witch of the West. Collins played the title role in the Saint Paul Civic Opera Association's presentation of The Unsinkable Molly Brown.

In 1971, Collins made her Broadway debut in Stephen Sondheim's Follies, portraying Sally Durant Plummer, a one-time Ziegfeld-style showgirl trapped in a disappointing marriage. Critic Martin Gottfried wrote of her performance: "Dorothy Collins, 'Hit Parade' jokes notwithstanding, has a voice of impressive versatility and range." Her performance earned a Tony Award nomination as Best Actress in a Musical, but lost to co-star, fellow Canadian-born actress Alexis Smith. When the production opened in Los Angeles in 1972, Collins reprised the role of Sally.

At the Melody Top summer stock theatre in Milwaukee, Wisconsin she starred in Good News (1975), and she reprised her role in Follies (1977). In 1980 she appeared as Dolly in Hello Dolly at An Evening Dinner Theatre, Elmsford, New York.

== Personal life ==
Collins was married to Raymond Scott from 1952 until their divorce in 1965. They had two daughters, Deborah and Elizabeth.

She married actor Ron Holgate in December 1966, whom she met in a touring production of Do I Hear A Waltz. Collins and Holgate had a daughter, Melissa. They separated in 1977, and divorced in 1980.

== Death ==
Dorothy Collins died in July 1994 from asthma and heart disease at her home in Watervliet, New York. She was survived by her three daughters. Her first husband, Raymond Scott, had died just five months earlier.
