= Sherman Edwards =

American composer and songwriter

- Born: Sherman Edwards; April 3, 1919; New York City, U.S.
- Died: March 30, 1981 (aged 61) New York City, U.S.
- Occupations: Composer, pianist, songwriter
- Instrument: Piano

Sherman Edwards (April 3, 1919 – March 30, 1981) was an American composer, jazz pianist, and songwriter, best known for his songs from the 1969 Broadway musical 1776 and the 1972 film adaptation.

== Early life ==
Edwards was born in the East Harlem neighborhood of New York City and was raised in the Weequahic section of Newark, New Jersey, where he attended Weequahic High School. He attended New York University, where he majored in history. Throughout college, Edwards moonlighted, playing jazz piano for late night radio and music shows. After serving in the U.S. Army Air Forces during World War II, Edwards taught high school history for a brief period before continuing his career as a pianist, playing with some of history's most famous swing bands and artists, including Louis Armstrong, Tommy Dorsey and Benny Goodman.

He lived in Parsippany, New Jersey, from 1958 to 1981.

== Early music career ==
After a few years as a band leader and arranger for artist Mindy Carson, Edwards started writing pop songs at the Brill Building with writers including Hal David, Burt Bacharach, Sid Wayne, Earl Shuman and others. He turned out numerous hits in the late 1950s and early 1960s. As Rock n' Roll caught on, he found himself still at the Brill Building writing songs for Elvis Presley, including the Presley number Flaming Star. However, working with Presley's manager "The Colonel" proved to be Edwards' impetus to leave pop and rock songwriting; Presley's songwriters were forced to make huge monetary concessions in order to have their songs recorded by Presley.

According to collaborator Earl Shuman, one day while collaborating with Edwards in the Brill building, where publishers provided music rooms for the songwriters, Edwards left mid-song saying something to the effect that he "wasn't into the rock songs any more" and that he had an idea for a show and was going home to write it. This began the evolution of 1776.

Prior to 1776, Edwards had written the incidental music for the stage comedy A Mighty Man is He, which opened on Broadway at the Cort Theatre on January 6, 1960, and closed January 9 after five performances.

Edwards also wrote the score for a children’s musical “Who’s Afraid of Mother Goose?” With lyrics by Ruth Batchelor, this one-hour show was broadcast on ABC-TV on October 13, 1967. It starred Maureen O'Hara and featured Peter Gennaro, Frankie Avalon, Nancy Sinatra, Margaret Hamilton, Dick Shawn, Dan Rowan, and Dick Martin.

== Popular songs written by Edwards ==
- "Broken Hearted Melody" (words by Hal David), a 1959 hit for Sarah Vaughan
- "Dungaree Doll" (words by Ben Raleigh), a 1955 hit for Eddie Fisher
- "Flaming Star" (words by Sid Wayne), the theme song for the 1960 Elvis Presley film of the same name
- "The Sounds of Summer" (words by Sid Wayne), recorded by the Harry Simeone Chorale
- "Johnny Get Angry" (words by Hal David), a 1962 hit for Joanie Sommers
- "Wonderful! Wonderful!" (words by Ben Raleigh), a 1957 success for Johnny Mathis
- "See You in September" (words by Sid Wayne), a 1959 hit for The Tempos and 1966 hit for The Happenings
- "For Heaven's Sake", recorded by Billie Holiday on the 1958 album Lady in Satin

== 1776 ==
Edwards' crowning achievement was, arguably, the musical 1776, for which he wrote the original book, lyrics and music. Peter Stone re-wrote the book. The show depicts the meeting of the Continental Congress in Philadelphia, culminating with the signing of the Declaration of Independence. It opened at the 46th Street Theatre on March 16, 1969, and ran for 1,217 performances. It won the Tony Award for Best Musical.

=== Musical numbers ===
1. Overture
2. "Sit Down, John" – Adams, Congress
3. "Piddle, Twiddle and Resolve"/"Till Then" – Adams
4. "Till Then" – Adams, Abigail
5. "The Lees of Old Virginia" – Lee, Franklin, Adams
6. "But, Mr. Adams" – Adams, Franklin, Jefferson, Sherman, Livingston
7. "Yours, Yours, Yours" – John, Abigail
8. "He Plays the Violin" – Martha Jefferson, Franklin, Adams
9. "Cool, Cool, Considerate Men" – Dickinson, The Conservatives
10. "Mama Look Sharp" – Courier, McNair, Leather Apron
11. "The Egg" – Franklin, Adams, Jefferson
12. "Molasses to Rum" – Rutledge
13. "Compliments" – Abigail
14. "Is Anybody There?" – Adams
15. Finale

=== Film version ===
The musical's 1972 film 1776 retained all of Edwards' songs. "Cool, Cool, Considerate Men" was edited out of the film after its initial reserved-seat road showings. The song – about the right-leaning South facing the left-leaning North – was also left off of the first VHS release. The number was restored for cable TV viewings and DVD release.

== Personal life ==
Edwards was married to Ingrid (Secretan) Edwards, a dancer who was a member of the original Ed Sullivan dancers and danced on Broadway in Sweethearts, Annie Get Your Gun, and Kiss Me, Kate.

== Death ==
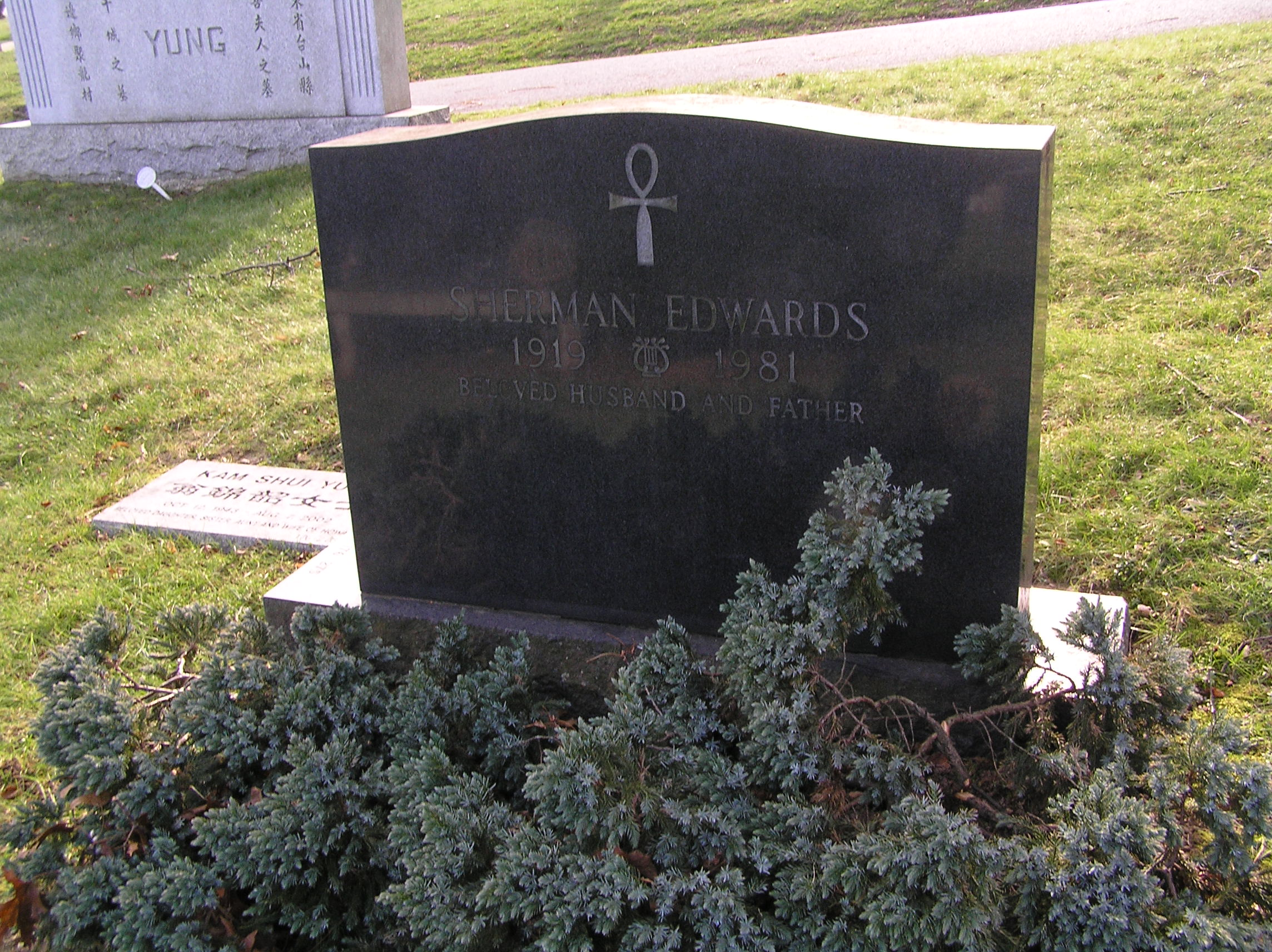
The grave of Sherman Edwards

Edwards died of a heart attack in Manhattan at age 61 in 1981 and was interred at Kensico Cemetery in Valhalla, New York. He was survived by his wife, Ingrid; his son, Keith; his daughter, Valerie, and his mother, Rae Edwards.
