= David Ford (actor) =

American actor (1925–1983)

- Ford in Dark Shadows
- Born: David Conant Ford; October 30, 1925; La Jolla, California, U.S.
- Died: August 7, 1983 (aged 57); New York City, U.S.
- Resting place: Fort Rosecrans National Cemetery, San Diego
- Occupation: Actor
- Years active: 1951–1972
- Spouse: Nancy Barrett (m. 1967; div. 1969)

David Conant Ford (October 30, 1925 – August 7, 1983) was an American actor. He was known for roles on TV's Dark Shadows (1966–1971) and Search for Tomorrow (1951), and as John Hancock in both the 1776 Broadway musical and its film adaptation.

== Career ==
He appeared in the role of Sam Evans, the alcoholic widower, artist, and father of Maggie Evans (Kathryn Leigh Scott) on the ABC-TV serial Dark Shadows from 1966 to 1968. He assumed the role when Mark Allen, who originated the role, departed following episode 22 of the first year. He also played Andre du Pres, the father of Josette du Pres, in the show's 1795 storyline.

He later played the contract role of Karl Devlin on the CBS soap opera Search for Tomorrow.

He made his Broadway debut as O'Kelly in the 1957 revival of Mary Stuart, and later took over as the Duke of Norfolk in the original production of A Man For All Seasons. On stage, his best known role was John Hancock in the musical 1776 and the 1972 film adaptation.

== Personal life ==
Ford was born in La Jolla, California. He was a graduate of Arizona State College and the University of South Dakota. He served in the Navy in World War II. He studied at the Dramatic Workshop of the New School for Social Research. In 1967, he married his Dark Shadows co-star, Nancy Barrett; they divorced in 1969.

== Death ==
Ford, who suffered from alcoholism for most of his life, died of a heart attack in New York City on August 7, 1983. He was 57 years old. He was buried in Fort Rosecrans National Cemetery in San Diego, California.

== Filmography ==
| Year | Title | Role | Notes |
|---|---|---|---|
| 1959 | Middle of the Night | Paul Kingsley | |
| 1970 | Loving | Al | |
| 1972 | 1776 | Congressional President John Hancock (MA) | (final film role) |
