= Emory Bass =

American actor (1925–2015)

Bass

Emory Bass (born Emory P. Bass, Jr.; August 12, 1925 – March 4, 2015) was an American theater and television actor. His television career included guest roles on Hart to Hart, Dark Shadows, Mr. Belvedere, Murder, She Wrote, and Webster. He also had a recurring role as Phipps in the ABC television series, Angie (1979–80).

== Life and career ==
Bass was born in Valdosta, Georgia to Estelle (née Johnston) and Emory P. Bass, Sr. He received a bachelor's degree in journalism. He then spent two years performing at the Barter Theatre in Abingdon, Virginia, after graduation before moving to New York City.

Bass began his professional career as a cast member of a touring production of the play, Glad Tidings, starring Tallulah Bankhead. He and Bankhead remained lifelong friends after the tour. Bass toured with the productions of Everybody Loves Opal, starring Nancy Walker; Time Out for Ginger, starring Art Carney; and Woman of the Year, starring Lauren Bacall.

In New York City, Bass appeared on Broadway in The Teahouse of the August Moon, Pal Joey, Can-Can, and the 1973 revival of Irene, starring Debbie Reynolds. Bass starred as James Wilson in both the original Broadway production of the musical, 1776, which opened in 1969, as well the 1972 film adaptation, 1776.

Bass appeared in a number of Off Broadway productions, including Bad Habits, By Jupiter, The Boys from Syracuse, and Lysistrata. Outside the U.S., he starred in an overseas production of A Funny Thing Happened on the Way to the Forum. He was also the spokesperson and voice of the Discover Card's advertising campaign for three years.

== Death ==
Emory Bass died in Woodland Hills, Los Angeles on March 4, 2015, aged 89.

== Filmography ==
=== Film ===
| Year | Title | Role | Notes |
|---|---|---|---|
| 1972 | 1776 | Judge James Wilson (PA) | |
| 1978 | The Cheap Detective | Butler | |
| 1979 | Scavenger Hunt | Hotel Manager | |
| 1988 | 18 Again! | Art Teacher | |
| 1989 | Murphy's Laws of Golf | Salesman | Short Film; final film role |

=== Television ===
| Year | Title | Role | Notes |
|---|---|---|---|
| 1970–1971 | Dark Shadows | Mr. Best / Minister / Opening Voiceover | 4 episodes |
| 1975 | Kojak | Stacowski | Episode: "Money Back Guarantee" |
| 1976 | The Tony Randall Show | Maitre D' | Episode: "Pilot" |
| 1977 | Mixed Nuts | Dr. Folder | TV movie |
| 1978 | A.E.S. Hudson Street | Oosterhazen | Episode: "In the Black" |
| 1979 | The Jeffersons | Clifford Wentworth | Episode: "Every Night Fever" |
| 1979 | Rendezvous Hotel | Edward Daley | TV movie |
| 1979–1980 | Angie | Phipps | 16 episodes |
| 1982 | Hart to Hart | Mr. Pond | Episode: "Hart of Diamonds" |
| 1982 | The Devlin Connection | | Episode: "Ring of Kings, Ring of Thieves" |
| 1982 | CBS Children's Mystery Theatre | Charles Edmund Emerson III | Episode: "The Zertigo Diamond Caper" |
| 1983 | Three's Company | Maitre D' | Episode: "Janet's Little Helper" |
| 1984 | Second Edition | | TV movie |
| 1984 | Three's a Crowd | Recital Host | Episode: "Vacation from Sex" |
| 1985 | Simon & Simon | Louis Boren | Episode: "Mummy Talks" |
| 1986 | Silver Spoons | Rupert Metcalf | Episode: "The Lady Is a Tramp" |
| 1986 | Dynasty | Clerk | Episode: "The Alarm" |
| 1986 | Webster | Butler Bob | Episode: "That's Rich" |
| 1987 | Brothers | Eric | Episode: "Man's Choice" |
| 1987–1990 | Murder, She Wrote | Jonathan Barish / Manager | 2 episodes |
| 1990 | Mr. Belvedere | Minister | Episode: "Mr. Belvedere's Wedding: Part 2" |
| 1991 | Father Dowling Mysteries | Auctioneer | Episode: "The Consulting Detective Mystery" |
| 1994 | Hart to Hart: Old Friends Never Die | | TV movie; final role |
