= Paul Michael Valley =

American television and stage actor (born 1965)

- Born: September 24, 1965 (age 60); Whitefish Bay, Wisconsin, U.S.
- Education: American University; Juilliard School (BFA)
- Occupation: actor
- Years active: 1990–present

Paul Michael Valley (born September 24, 1965) is an American television and stage actor.

== Early life and education ==
Valley was born in Whitefish Bay, Wisconsin. When he was eight years old he moved with his family to Greenwich, Connecticut. In 1984 he moved to Washington, D.C., where he attended American University for two years, followed by a year as an apprentice to Michael Kahn, the artistic director of the Shakespeare Theatre Company. Valley then attended the Juilliard School in New York City, where he was a member of the drama division's Group 20 (1987–1991). After his third year at Juilliard, he left to take on roles in television soap operas.

== Career ==
Among his numerous television credits, his most memorable and long-lasting role was his portrayal of Ryan Harrison on the soap opera Another World from 1990 to 1995. He left the show, and executive producer Jill Farren Phelps had his character shot to death by his brother Grant (Mark Pinter).

Valley then took on stage roles, including Bertram in All's Well That Ends Well at the Shakespeare Theatre and as Thomas Jefferson in 1776 at the Roundabout Theatre, which moved to Broadway in 1997. He followed that with work in regional theater and also appeared in guest roles on the television series Third Watch, Ed, and Law & Order: Special Victims Unit.

In 2011, he starred in the off-Broadway comedy Any Given Monday at the 59E59 Theaters. In 2015 he played the role of Richard Hart in "Hold Outs" the 9th episode of the 6th season of the CBS police procedural drama Blue Bloods.

== Stage ==
Year	Title	Role(s)	Venue	Notes	Ref.
1986	Romeo and Juliet	Petruchio	Shakespeare Theatre Company		
1987	Love's Labor's Lost	performer	Shakespeare Theatre Company		
1996	All's Well That Ends Well	Bertram	Shakespeare Theatre Company		
1997	1776	Thomas Jefferson	Criterion Center Stage Right	Broadway debut	
1999	Walking Off The Roof	Brett	Signature Theatre Company		
1999	Hurrah at Last	Oliver	Gramercy Theatre		
2000	Arms and the Man	Major Sergius Saranoff	Gramercy Theatre		
2011	Legacy of Light	Monsieur du Châtelet	Cleveland Play House		
2011	Any Given Monday	Lenny	59E59 Theaters		
2012	Amazing Grace	Ensemble	Norma Terris Theatre		
2013	Talley's Folly	understudy Matt Friedman	Laura Pels Theatre		
2013	And Give Us The Shadows	Eugene, Jr.	Schoolhouse Theater		
2014	The Winter's Tale	Polixenes	Old Globe Theatre		
2014	Mr. Confidential	Howard Rushmore	New York Musical Theatre Festival		
2016	The House of Blue Leaves	Artie	Wellesley Repertory Theatre		
2018	The Liar	Alcippe	Wellesley Repertory Theatre		
2025	As You Like It	Jaques	Commonwealth Shakespeare Company		
