= Ron Holgate =

American actor and opera singer

- Born: Ronald Holgate; May 26, 1937 (age 88); Aberdeen, South Dakota, U.S.
- Occupations: Actor, singer
- Years active: 1960s–2000s
- Spouse(s): Dorothy Collins (m. 1966–1977; divorced); Anny DeGange (m. 1989–present)

Ronald Holgate (born May 26, 1937, Aberdeen, South Dakota) is an American actor and opera singer. He won the Tony Award for Best Supporting Actor as Richard Henry Lee in the original Broadway production of 1776, a role he reprised in 1972 for the film 1776.

== Early life ==
The son of a school superintendent and a drama teacher, raised in South Dakota, Holgate originally intended to become a classical actor and studied drama with Alvina Krause at Northwestern University. While there, however, he was discovered by Boris Goldovsky, and went on to study opera at both Tanglewood and the New England Conservatory. In 1959, Holgate, a bass-baritone, won second prize in the Metropolitan Opera National Council Auditions, finishing behind Teresa Stratas; he went on to tour with Goldovsky's New England Opera Theater. In 1960 he attended the Music Academy of the West summer conservatory.

== Career ==
By the early 1960s, however, Holgate had gone back to theater, only resuming a regular opera career in the 1970s. Roles like the narcissistic Miles Gloriosus in A Funny Thing Happened on the Way to the Forum (which he originated in the show's Broadway premiere) led to him developing a reputation for what Frank Rich called his portrayal of "vain ladies' men."

Until 2005, he worked regularly on and Off-Broadway, in regional theatre, and in over a dozen national and international tours. As an opera singer, Holgate played leading roles in La Boheme, Don Giovanni, and the world premiere of Philip Marshall, among many others. He had an active career as a concert singer, which included performances at Carnegie Hall and a Broadway revue with his first wife, Dorothy Collins (1926–1994). He and Collins were married from 1966-77. He was featured in the first concert devoted to Stephen Sondheim's work.

Holgate appeared as Richard Henry Lee in 1776. Although he had only one song, "The Lees of Old Virginia", and a scant few lines of additional dialogue, he earned that season's Tony Award as Best Featured Actor in a Musical.

Critic Walter Kerr commented that "there is simply no stopping Mr. Holgate as he explodes with the sheer happiness of having come to exist." (Holgate and fellow 1776 performer William Daniels were nominated in the same, supporting category. Daniels turned down the nomination, because he felt that his role as John Adams was clearly the lead.)

Holgate created the role of the vain opera star Tito Morelli in Lend Me a Tenor. He was Buffalo Bill Cody in the 1999 revised edition of Annie Get Your Gun starring Bernadette Peters and Tom Wopat, and in the early 2000s he toured as Caldwell B. Cladwell in the first national tour of the musical Urinetown. Later in 1999, he played Harrison Howell in the Broadway revival of Kiss Me, Kate; as an inside joke, when he made his initial appearance, the orchestra played the intro to "The Lees of Old Virginia," which roused hearty laughter from audience members who remembered his signature role.

Holgate has few film and television credits. He played Lee again in the film 1776, and was featured in the straight-to-video Men of Means. He has acted occasionally in daytime soap operas, including Another World, Guiding Light, and One Life to Live.

== Personal life ==
Holgate was married to singer Dorothy Collins from 1966 to 1977, to Anny DeGange from 1989 to the present, and has three daughters, Melissa, Chloe, and Lily.

== Stage productions ==
Broadway

- Milk and Honey: chorus
- A Funny Thing Happened on the Way to the Forum: Miles Gloriosus
- Sweet Charity: Vittorio Vidal (one-week vacation replacement for James Luisi)
- 1776: Richard Henry Lee
- Saturday Sunday Monday: Luigi Ianniello
- The Grand Tour: Colonel Tadeusz Boleslav Stjerbinsky
- Musical Chairs: Joe Preston
- 42nd Street: Julian Marsh (replacement)
- Lend Me a Tenor: Tito Merelli (also West End production)
- Guys and Dolls: Big Jule (replacement)
- Annie Get Your Gun: "Buffalo Bill"
- Kiss Me, Kate: Harrison Howell

Off-Broadway

- Hobo: Jonah
- Hooray! It's a Glorious Day...and all that: Carl Strong
- Blue Plate Special: Larry Finney
- The Sounds of Rodgers and Hammerstein, Part II
- Milk and Honey: Phil Arkin
- Heroes

== Awards and nominations ==
- 1959 Frederick K. Weyerhauser Scholarship, Metropolitan Opera Auditions
- 1974 New Jersey Drama Critic's Circle Award: A Little Night Music
- 1969 Tony Award: winner, 1776: Best Performance by a Featured Actor in a Musical
- 1979 Tony Award: nominee, The Grand Tour
- 1992 Detroit Drama Critic's Circle Award: Man of La Mancha
- 2005 IRNE Award (Independent Reviewers of New England): Urinetown
