= First Impressions (musical) =

1959 Broadway musical

- 1959 Original Broadway Cast Recording
- Music: George Weiss; Bo Goldman; Glenn Paxton
- Lyrics: George Weiss; Bo Goldman; Glenn Paxton
- Book: Abe Burrows
- Basis: Jane Austen's novel Pride and Prejudice and Helen Jerome's 1935 play based on the novel
- Productions: 1959 Broadway

First Impressions is a Broadway musical with music and lyrics by George Weiss, Bo Goldman, and Glenn Paxton, and book by Abe Burrows, who also directed the musical. It is based on Helen Jerome's 1935 stage adaptation of Jane Austen's 1813 novel Pride and Prejudice.

== Background ==
Abe Burrows, who had previously written the books for the successful musicals Guys and Dolls, Can-Can, and Say, Darling, wrote the book for a new musical adaptation of Jane Austen's Pride and Prejudice. The score was credited to three authors: George Weiss, Robert Goldman, and Glenn Paxton, though composer Jule Styne, who produced the show under the auspices of the "Jule Styne Organization", was said to have augmented the score. The score mixes early-19th-century "period" music with standard Broadway idioms of the 1950s. The musical was originally titled A Perfect Evening, but before rehearsals began, the show's creators changed it to First Impressions, Austen's original, pre-publication title for Pride and Prejudice.

The show was not a success. Burrows thought critics were hard on him because they wondered why a comedy guy would take on a "tired period drama," but he also took some unusual liberties with the story. In contrast to the novel, the musical concentrates more on Mrs. Bennet's perspective and on her tireless attempts to marry off her five daughters despite the family's lack of money. The emphasis on Mrs. Bennet resulted from having cast a star (Gingold) in what Austen meant to be a secondary role.

When Austen wrote her first novel, about the Bennet family of Longbourn, she called it First Impressions, but could not find a publisher. However, once Austen's second novel, Sense & Sensibility, became a popular success, the book's publisher, T. Egerton of Whitehall, agreed to release First Impressions after changing the name to Pride & Prejudice. In this early instance of successful branding, the novel called First Impressions went nowhere, but given the title Pride & Prejudice quickly became one of the great classics of Western literature.

== Production ==
The Broadway production premiered at the Alvin Theater, New York City, on March 19, 1959, and played 84 performances. The stars of the original cast were Hermione Gingold (as Mrs. Bennet), Polly Bergen (as Elizabeth Bennet), and Farley Granger (as Mr. Darcy), supported by Phyllis Newman (Jane Bennet), Ellen Hanley (Charlotte Lucas), Christopher Hewett (Mr. Collins), Donald Madden (Charles Bingley), and James Mitchell (Capt. Wickham). Hewett replaced Hiram Sherman after the show's out-of-town tryout, while Hanley replaced Bergen shortly into the run.

According to Granger, the musical was beset by a series of disasters, the most notable all involving the frequently dangerous sets. Granger said several dancers were injured during rehearsals and the tryout in New Haven. Moreover, reports Granger, Gingold, and Bergen disliked each other, and Mitchell felt ill-used. Stuart Hodes Mitchell's understudy and one of the injured dancers, says that Granger's account was exaggerated. Hodes also notes that Lucas's several replacements as choreographer included an uncredited Herbert Ross.

Fifteen-year-old Lauri Peters, who played Kitty Bennet, left a good enough first impression on Richard Rodgers that he invited her to audition for his next show, The Sound of Music. Rodgers and Oscar Hammerstein II cast her in the role of Liesl, the eldest daughter, in the 1959 original Broadway production of The Sound of Music. Peters shared a Tony Award nomination for the role, and stayed with the show for two years.

== Synopsis ==
Like the novel, the musical is concerned primarily with the rocky courtship between Elizabeth Bennet, a poor gentleman's daughter with four sisters, and Mr. Fitzwilliam Darcy, a wealthy aristocrat who arrives in Miss Elizabeth's rural village in 1813. The course of true love is hindered by minor character flaws on both sides—his pride and reserve, which look like arrogance to her, and her tendency to jump to erroneous conclusions based on little evidence, as well as her verbal assertiveness, which mildly scandalizes him. Both eventually realize that they have misjudged each other, however, and find that they are actually ideally suited for each other.

== Songs ==
- Five Daughters – Mrs. Bennet
- I'm Me – Elizabeth and her sisters
- Have You Heard The News (Rumour) – Mrs. Bennet and company
- A Perfect Evening – Elizabeth and Mr. Darcy
- As Long As There's A Mother – Mrs. Bennet and her daughters
- Jane – Bingley and Darcy
- Love Will Find Out the Way – Elizabeth
- A Gentleman Never Falls Wildly In Love – Mr. Darcy
- Fragrant Flower – Mr. Collins and Elizabeth
- I Feel Sorry For The Girl (What a Day to Fall in Love) – Jane Bennet, Mr. Bingley, and company
- (I Suddenly Find It) Agreeable – Elizabeth and Mr. Darcy
- This Really Isn't Me – Elizabeth
- A Simply Lovely Wedding – Charlotte Lucas, Mrs. Bennet, Elizabeth, and company
- A House In Town – Mrs. Bennet
- The Heart Has Won the Game – Mr. Darcy
- Let's Fetch the Carriage – Mrs. Bennet and Elizabeth

After decades out of print, the original cast album was rereleased on CD in 2002.
