= Rex Robbins =

American actor

- Born: Roger McNicol Robbins; March 30, 1935; Pierre, South Dakota, U.S.
- Died: September 23, 2003 (aged 68); Minneapolis, Minnesota, U.S.
- Occupation(s): Actor, singer

Rex McNicol Robbins (March 30, 1935 – September 23, 2003) was an American character actor of stage and screen. He played the Narrator/Mysterious Man in the first national tour of Into the Woods. Robbins also portrayed Herbie in the first Broadway revival of Gypsy.

== Career ==
Robbins appeared opposite Angela Lansbury in the 1974 Broadway revival of Gypsy. He made his Broadway debut in 1963 as the doctor in One Flew Over the Cuckoo's Nest and subsequently went on to play roles in over 30 plays and films. He also starred with John Lithgow in several British plays, including The Changing Room (1973) and Comedians (1976) and was directed by Lithgow in Boy Meets Girl (1976) based on the 1938 film of the same name. He replaced David Ogden Stiers in the long-running Doug Henning musical The Magic Show.

In 1972, he played the role of Roger Sherman in the film version of the musical 1776. Off-Broadway, he appeared in Urban Blight at Manhattan Theatre Club, A.R. Gurney's The Dining Room at Playwrights Horizons and Henry IV, Part I at the Public Theater. His last stage appearance was as Mr. Brown in the musical adaption of James Joyce's The Dead in 2000. His last film was a brief appearance in The Royal Tenenbaums.

== Personal life ==
Robbins was born in Pierre, South Dakota, to Lucy Geraldine (McNicol), who worked in journalism, and Clarence Edward Robbins, a doctor. He was an alumnus of Yale University and was married with three children. Robbins died of a stroke on September 23, 2003, at age 68.

== Partial filmography ==
- Shaft (1971) – Rollie
- 1776 (1972) – Roger Sherman (CT)
- Simon (1980) – Army doctor
- The First Time (1983) – Leon
- The Man Who Wasn't There (1983) – Minister
- Reuben, Reuben (1983) – C. B. Springer
- Key Exchange (1985) – Dr. Fanshaw
- The Secret of My Success (1987) – McMasters
- Vampire's Kiss (1988) – Sidney Langdon
- Love or Money (1990) – Al McDonough
- Stella (1990) – Minister
- I.Q. (1994) – Suit
- Breathing Room (1996) – David's Father
- The Associate (1996) – Investor at 21 Club
- The Royal Tenenbaums (2001) – Mr. Levinson (final film role)
