= Andrew McNair (custodian) =

Bellringer and custodian of the Continental Congress

Andrew McNair is best known for being the custodian who served the Continental Congress. A member of the Masonic Order, he served as official ringer of the Liberty Bell from 1759 to 1776, and he likely rang it to announce independence, on July 8, 1776 (the announcement was delayed four days to allow the Declaration of Independence to be printed). McNair died September 15, 1776. There are no records of where he was buried. The records of the American Philosophical Society record that on March 22, 1768, the Society contracted McNair to make the fires, light and extinguish candles, and keep its meeting room clean, for four shillings a night.

McNair was played in the play and movie 1776 by William Duell.

In his poem, "The Liberty Bell," Charles Brockden Brown describes McNair, not by name as follows:

Far aloft in that high steeple,
Sat the bellman, old and gray.
He was weary of the tyrant
And his iron-sceptered way.
