= Michael McCormick (actor) =

American actor (born 1951)

- Born: July 24, 1951 (age 74); Gary, Indiana
- Occupation: Actor
- Years active: 1965–present

Michael McCormick (born July 24, 1951) is an American actor who has appeared in many Broadway productions as well as national tours, off-Broadway and regional theatre, as well as television.

== Early life and career ==
McCormick was born on July 24, 1951, in Gary, Indiana, where his father was a steelworker. At 12, he made his stage debut in a touring company of Oliver! at the then-Sam Shubert Theatre (now CIBC Theatre) in Chicago. After the touring company, he performed on a return performance of Oliver! on broadway at the Al Hirschfeld Theatre. After Oliver!, in 1965 he was cast as one of teenage children of the lead characters in The Porcelain Year, an ill-fated broadway show written by Reginald Rose that closed quickly after poor reviews; McCormick said "It was a real drama. It was tough because I was just a kid and had never taken acting classes."

Following the disappointing experience on Porcelain, he returned to Indiana and had a difficult time rejoining high school midway through the first year. After high school, he was a theater student at Northwestern University and graduated in 1973, having won the senior best actor award.

== Theater career ==
His Broadway roles include The Wizard in Wicked, Judge in Hello Dolly!, Mack Sennett, Charlie Chaplin Sr. and McGranery in Chaplin, Mr. Greenway in Elf, Oscar Shapiro in Curtains, Grandpa Seth Who in How the Grinch Stole Christmas, Pop in The Pajama Game, Leary in Marie Christine, John Adams and Caesar Rodney in 1776, and Gangster (First Man) in Kiss Me, Kate. On tour, he starred as Max in The Producers and played Thénardier in Les Miserables, among others.

In 2022 he created the roles of Fred Colby and Tommy O’Rourke in A Beautiful Noise on Broadway. A review in Variety praised McCormick's "comedic talents" in the role.

== Personal life ==
He lives in Connecticut with his wife Alison Bevan, who he met in a play, although they never worked together professionally since. She starred in a number of productions at the Repertory Theatre of St. Louis, among others, before leaving acting. They have one son together.

== Acting credits ==
=== Selected theatre credits ===
Year(s)	Production	Role	Notes
1964-65	Oliver!	Workhouse Boy / Fagin's Gang	National tour
1965	Oliver!	Londoner u/s Noah Claypool	Broadway
1987-91	Les Misérables	Grantaire / Bamatabois / Chain Gang / Drinker u/s Monsieur Thénardier	National tour
1987-91	Les Misérables	Monsieur Thénardier	National tour
1989	The Secret Garden	Dr. Neville Craven	Regional
1991	La Bête	Servant u/s Rene Du Parc	Broadway
1993	Kiss of the Spider Woman	Marcos u/s Warden	Broadway
1995	Kiss of the Spider Woman	Warden	National tour
1997	1776	Caesar Rodney u/s John Hancock	Broadway
1997	1776	John Adams	Broadway
2003	Gypsy	Cigar/Uncle Jocko u/s Herbie	Broadway
2004	The Producers	Franz Liebkind	National tour
2006	Dr. Seuss' How the Grinch Stole Christmas! The Musical	Grandpa Seth Who	Broadway
2007-08	Curtains	Oscar Shapiro	Broadway
2008	Les Misérables	Monsieur Thénardier	Hollywood Bowl
2010-11	Elf	Mr. Greenway	Broadway
2011	The Producers	Max Bialystock	Regional
2013	The Producers	Max Bialystock	Regional
2013	Ragtime	J.P. Morgan	Avery Fisher Hall
2013	Les Misérables	Monsieur Thénardier	The Muny
2015	My Fair Lady	Alfred P. Doolittle	The Muny
2015	Into the Woods	The Mysterious Man / Cinderella's Father	The Muny
2016	1776	John Hancock	Encores!
2016	Fiddler on the Roof	Tevye	The Muny
2017	Hello, Dolly!	Judge / Ensemble u/s Horace Vandergelder	Broadway
2019–22	Wicked	The Wonderful Wizard of Oz	Broadway
2022–23	A Beautiful Noise	Paul Colby / Tommy O’Rourke u/s Neil (Now)	Broadway
2023-24	A Beautiful Noise	Fred Weintraub / Tommy O’Rourke u/s Neil (Now)	Broadway
2025	Wicked	The Wonderful Wizard of Oz	Broadway
2025	Theatre People	Arthur Sanders	Westport Country Playhouse
2025	The Rink	Ben	Classic Stage Company
