= Donald Madden =

American actor (1933–1983)

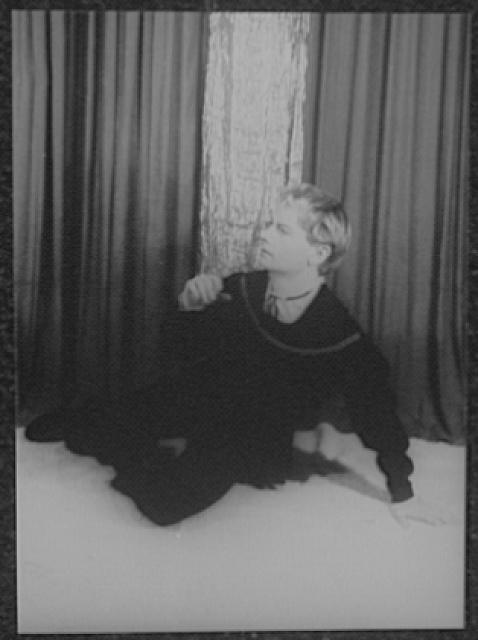
- Madden as Hamlet in 1961
- Born: November 5, 1933; New York City, U.S.
- Died: January 22, 1983 (aged 49); Central Islip, New York, U.S.
- Occupation: Actor
- Years active: 1953–1980

Donald Richard Madden (November 5, 1933 – January 22, 1983) was an American theater, television, and film actor known for his role as John Dickinson in the film 1776 (1972) and his portrayal of Hamlet onstage in New York.

== Life and career ==
Born as Donald Richard Madden in New York City, he attended City College of New York and graduated with a degree in Theater. After serving in the United States Army for two years from July 27, 1951, to July 27, 1953, he worked in regional theater, including a tour of Tea and Sympathy opposite Linda Darnell. Madden made his Broadway debut as Jimmy Porter in Look Back In Anger in 1958. He made his Broadway musical debut as Charles Bingley in First Impressions, a musical adaptation of Pride and Prejudice, in 1959. The following year he appeared in an off-Broadway production of Julius Caesar and won the Theatre World Award for his performance. In 1960, he played Hotspur in Henry IV, Part 1 at The Phoenix Theater. In 1961 he played the title role in Hamlet on Broadway to critical acclaim. He received further accolades as the title role in Joseph Papp's 1970 production of Richard III at the Delacorte Theater. Shortly after he appeared as Eilert Lovborg in the 1971 production of Hedda Gabler and as Torvald Helmer in A Doll's House opposite Claire Bloom and Patricia Elliott. Additional theater credits include the 1967 comedy Black Comedy/White Lies, for which he was nominated for the Tony Award for Best Performance by a Leading Actor in a Play, and revival of Arms and the Man in 1971. His last Broadway appearance was in the thriller Trick in 1979. After its short run he was diagnosed with cancer.

== Film and television ==
Madden appeared with Colleen Dewhurst in the 1959 television adaptation of John Steinbeck's Burning Bright. He guest starred in the British TV spy series, Espionage in 1963. He had the recurring role of Bryan Cannon on the television series Dr. Kildare in 1966. He also appeared in the soap operas One Life to Live and Another World. In 1972 he portrayed John Dickinson in 1776, his only feature film. His final TV appearance was as Mr. Brown in Mark Twain's Life on the Mississippi in 1980.

== Death ==
Madden died of lung cancer in Central Islip, New York in 1983, aged 49. He had been diagnosed with the disease during the run of his final Broadway show Trick in 1979.

== Filmography ==
- 1776 (1972) - John Dickinson (PA)
