= Peanuts filmography =

This is a list of adaptations in film, television, musical theater, and video games, based on characters from the Peanuts comic strip by Charles M. Schulz.

== Feature films ==
Title	Release date	Distributor	Release(s) via
A Boy Named Charlie Brown	December 4, 1969	National General Pictures	VHS, Betamax, CED, LaserDisc, DVD, Blu-ray
Snoopy Come Home	August 9, 1972	National General Pictures	VHS, Betamax, CED, LaserDisc, DVD, Blu-ray
Race for Your Life, Charlie Brown	August 24, 1977	Paramount Pictures	VHS, Betamax, CED, LaserDisc, DVD, Blu-ray
Bon Voyage, Charlie Brown (and Don't Come Back!!)	May 23, 1980	Paramount Pictures	VHS, Betamax, LaserDisc, DVD, Blu-ray
The Peanuts Movie	November 6, 2015	20th Century Fox	DVD, Blu-ray, Blu-ray 3D, 4K Ultra HD
Snoopy Unleashed	2027	AppleTV	

=== Reception ===
==== Box office performance ====
Film	Budget	Box office gross			Ref(s)
Film	Budget	United States	Other territories	Worldwide	Ref(s)
A Boy Named Charlie Brown	$1,100,000	$12,000,000		$12,000,000	
Snoopy Come Home	$1,000,000				
Race for Your Life, Charlie Brown		$3,223,888		$3,223,888	
Bon Voyage, Charlie Brown (and Don't Come Back!!)		$2,013,193		$2,013,193	
The Peanuts Movie	$99,000,000	$130,178,411	$116,054,702	$246,233,113	
total	$101,100,000	$147,415,492	$116,054,702	$263,470,194	
List indicator: A dark-grey cell indicates the information is unavailable for the film.

== Television ==
=== Specials ===
Title	Original air date	Network	Other broadcast network(s)	Release(s) via	Notes
A Charlie Brown Christmas	Dec. 9, 1965	CBS	ABC (2001–19), Apple TV+ (2020–present), PBS (2020–21)	A Charlie Brown Christmas VHS; A Charlie Brown Christmas LaserDisc; A Charlie Brown Christmas iTunes; A Charlie Brown Christmas DVD; A Charlie Brown Christmas Deluxe Edition DVD; A Charlie Brown Christmas 50th Anniversary Deluxe Edition DVD; Peanuts 1960s Collection DVD; A Charlie Brown Christmas Blu-ray; Peanuts 70th Anniversary Holiday Collection Limited Edition Blu-Ray; Peanuts Holiday Collection Deluxe Edition 4K Ultra HD and Blu-Ray; Peanuts: 75th Anniversary Ultimate TV Specials Collection DVD and Blu-Ray	First Peanuts special
Charlie Brown's All Stars!	June 8, 1966	CBS	ABC (2009–14), Apple TV+ (2022–present)	A Charlie Brown Festival Vol. IV CED; Snoopy Double Feature Vol. 8 VHS; Peanuts Specials Vol. 1 iTunes; Lucy Must Be Traded, Charlie Brown (Bonus episode) VHS and DVD; Charlie Brown's All Stars 50th Anniversary Deluxe Edition DVD*; Peanuts 1960s Collection DVD; Peanuts 70th Anniversary Holiday Collection Limited Edition Blu-Ray; Peanuts Holiday Collection Deluxe Edition 4K Ultra HD and Blu-Ray; Peanuts: 75th Anniversary Ultimate TV Specials Collection DVD and Blu-Ray; It has the Paramount DVD logo in the beginning of the DVD itself.	
It's the Great Pumpkin, Charlie Brown	Oct. 27, 1966	CBS	ABC (2001–19), Apple TV+ (2020–present), PBS (2021)	A Charlie Brown Festival Vol. III CED; It's the Great Pumpkin, Charlie Brown VHS; It's the Great Pumpkin, Charlie Brown LaserDisc; It's the Great Pumpkin, Charlie Brown iTunes; It's the Great Pumpkin, Charlie Brown DVD; It's the Great Pumpkin, Charlie Brown Deluxe Edition DVD; It's the Great Pumpkin, Charlie Brown 50th Anniversary Deluxe Edition DVD; Peanuts 1960s Collection DVD; It's the Great Pumpkin, Charlie Brown Blu-ray; Peanuts 70th Anniversary Holiday Collection Limited Edition Blu-Ray; Peanuts Holiday Collection Deluxe Edition 4K Ultra HD and Blu-Ray; Peanuts: 75th Anniversary Ultimate TV Specials Collection DVD and Blu-Ray	
You're in Love, Charlie Brown	June 12, 1967	CBS	Apple TV+ (2022–present)	A Charlie Brown Festival CED; Snoopy Double Feature Vol. 4 VHS; Be My Valentine, Charlie Brown (Bonus episode) LaserDisc; Be My Valentine, Charlie Brown Deluxe Edition (Bonus episode) iTunes; Be My Valentine, Charlie Brown (Bonus episode) DVD; Be My Valentine, Charlie Brown Deluxe Edition (Bonus episode) DVD; Happiness is Peanuts: Friends Forever DVD; Peanuts 1960s Collection DVD; Peanuts: 75th Anniversary Ultimate TV Specials Collection DVD and Blu-Ray	
He's Your Dog, Charlie Brown	Feb. 14, 1968 (Valentine's Day)	CBS	Apple TV+ (2022–present)	A Charlie Brown Festival Vol. II CED; Snoopy Double Feature Vol. 2 VHS; Snoopy Double Feature Vol. 2 LaserDisc; Peanuts Specials Vol. 1 iTunes; He's Your Dog, Charlie Brown Deluxe Edition DVD; Peanuts 1960s Collection DVD; Peanuts: 75th Anniversary Ultimate TV Specials Collection DVD and Blu-Ray	
It Was a Short Summer, Charlie Brown	Sept. 27, 1969	CBS	Apple TV+ (2022–present, edited version)	A Charlie Brown Festival Vol. III CED; Snoopy Double Feature Vol. 3 VHS; It's the Great Pumpkin, Charlie Brown (Bonus episode) LaserDisc; Peanuts Specials Vol. 1 iTunes; He's a Bully, Charlie Brown (Bonus episode) DVD; Peanuts 1960s Collection DVD; Peanuts: 75th Anniversary Ultimate TV Specials Collection DVD and Blu-Ray	First Peanuts special to not receive an Emmy of any kind.
Play It Again, Charlie Brown	March 28, 1971	CBS	Apple TV+ (2023–present)	A Charlie Brown Festival Vol. IV CED; Snoopy Double Feature Vol. 7 VHS; A Charlie Brown Thanksgiving (Bonus episode) iTunes; Peanuts 1970s Collection, Vol. 1 DVD; Peanuts 70th Anniversary Holiday Collection Limited Edition Blu-Ray; Peanuts Holiday Collection Deluxe Edition 4K Ultra HD and Blu-Ray; Peanuts: 75th Anniversary Ultimate TV Specials Collection DVD and Blu-Ray	
You're Not Elected, Charlie Brown	Oct. 29, 1972	CBS	ABC (2006–19), Apple TV+ (2022–present)	A Charlie Brown Festival Vol. III CED; Snoopy Double Feature Vol. 3 VHS; A Charlie Brown Thanksgiving (Bonus episode) LaserDisc; You're Not Elected, Charlie Brown iTunes; It's the Great Pumpkin, Charlie Brown (Bonus episode) DVD; You're Not Elected, Charlie Brown Deluxe Edition DVD; Peanuts 1970s Collection, Vol. 1 DVD; Peanuts: 75th Anniversary Ultimate TV Specials Collection DVD and Blu-Ray	
There's No Time for Love, Charlie Brown	March 11, 1973	CBS	Apple TV+ (2022–present)	A Charlie Brown Festival CED; Snoopy Double Feature Vol. 5 VHS; Snoopy Double Feature Vol. 5 LaserDisc; Peanuts Specials Vol. 1 iTunes; A Charlie Brown Valentine (Bonus episode) DVD; Peanuts 1970s Collection, Vol. 1 DVD; Peanuts: 75th Anniversary Ultimate TV Specials Collection DVD and Blu-Ray	
A Charlie Brown Thanksgiving	Nov. 20, 1973	CBS	ABC (2001–19), Apple TV+ (2020–present), PBS (2020–21)	A Charlie Brown Festival Vol. III CED; A Charlie Brown Thanksgiving VHS; A Charlie Brown Thanksgiving LaserDisc; A Charlie Brown Thanksgiving iTunes; A Charlie Brown Thanksgiving DVD; A Charlie Brown Thanksgiving Deluxe Edition DVD; A Charlie Brown Thanksgiving 40th Anniversary Deluxe Edition DVD; Peanuts 1970s Collection, Vol. 1 DVD; Peanuts 70th Anniversary Holiday Collection Limited Edition Blu-Ray; Peanuts Holiday Collection Deluxe Edition 4K Ultra HD and Blu-Ray; Peanuts: 75th Anniversary Ultimate TV Specials Collection DVD and Blu-Ray	
It's a Mystery, Charlie Brown	Feb. 1, 1974	CBS	Apple TV+ (2023–present)	A Charlie Brown Festival Vol. IV CED; It's a Mystery, Charlie Brown VHS; Peanuts Holiday Classics iTunes; Peanuts Specials Vol. 1 iTunes; Peanuts 1970s Collection, Vol. 1 DVD; Peanuts: 75th Anniversary Ultimate TV Specials Collection DVD and Blu-Ray	
It's the Easter Beagle, Charlie Brown	April 9, 1974	CBS	ABC (2001–14), Apple TV+ (2021–present)	A Charlie Brown Thanksgiving (Australian edition bonus episode) VHS; A Charlie Brown Festival Vol. II CED; It's the Easter Beagle, Charlie Brown VHS; It's the Easter Beagle, Charlie Brown LaserDisc; It's the Easter Beagle, Charlie Brown iTunes; It's the Easter Beagle, Charlie Brown DVD; It's the Easter Beagle, Charlie Brown Deluxe Edition DVD; Peanuts 1970s Collection, Vol. 1 DVD; Peanuts: 75th Anniversary Ultimate TV Specials Collection DVD and Blu-Ray	
Be My Valentine, Charlie Brown	Jan. 28, 1975	CBS	ABC (2001–20), Apple TV+ (2021–present)	A Charlie Brown Festival Vol. II CED; Be My Valentine, Charlie Brown VHS; Be My Valentine, Charlie Brown LaserDisc; Be My Valentine, Charlie Brown iTunes; Be My Valentine, Charlie Brown DVD; Be My Valentine, Charlie Brown Deluxe Edition DVD; Peanuts 1970s Collection, Vol. 2 DVD; Peanuts: 75th Anniversary Ultimate TV Specials Collection DVD and Blu-Ray	
You're a Good Sport, Charlie Brown	Oct. 28, 1975	CBS	Apple TV+ (2023–present)	You're a Good Sport, Charlie Brown VHS; Peanuts Specials Vol. 1 iTunes; You're a Good Sport, Charlie Brown Deluxe Edition DVD; Peanuts 1970s Collection, Vol. 2 DVD; Peanuts: Emmy Honored Collection DVD; Peanuts: 75th Anniversary Ultimate TV Specials Collection DVD and Blu-Ray	
It's Arbor Day, Charlie Brown	March 16, 1976	CBS	Apple TV+ (2022–present)	It's Arbor Day, Charlie Brown VHS; It's the Easter Beagle, Charlie Brown iTunes; It's the Easter Beagle, Charlie Brown (Bonus episode) DVD; It's the Easter Beagle, Charlie Brown Deluxe Edition (Bonus episode) DVD; Peanuts 1970s Collection, Vol. 2 DVD; Peanuts: 75th Anniversary Ultimate TV Specials Collection DVD and Blu-Ray	
It's Your First Kiss, Charlie Brown	Oct. 24, 1977	CBS	Apple TV+ (2022–present)	A Charlie Brown Festival CED; Snoopy Double Feature Vol. 4 VHS; It's the Easter Beagle, Charlie Brown (Bonus episode) LaserDisc; Be My Valentine, Charlie Brown iTunes; Be My Valentine, Charlie Brown (Bonus episode) DVD; Be My Valentine, Charlie Brown Deluxe Edition (Bonus episode) DVD; Touchdown, Charlie Brown! Deluxe Edition DVD; Peanuts 1970s Collection, Vol. 2 DVD; Charlie Brown and Friends DVD (Repackage of Peanuts 1970s Collection, Vol. 2: DISC 2 ONLY); Peanuts: 75th Anniversary Ultimate TV Specials Collection DVD and Blu-Ray	
What a Nightmare, Charlie Brown!	Feb. 23, 1978	CBS	Apple TV+ (2023–present)	A Charlie Brown Festival Vol. IV CED; Snoopy Double Feature Vol. 6 VHS; Peanuts Specials Vol. 1 iTunes; Peanuts 1970s Collection, Vol. 2 DVD; Charlie Brown and Friends DVD (Repackage of Peanuts 1970s Collection, Vol. 2: DISC 2 ONLY); Peanuts: 75th Anniversary Ultimate TV Specials Collection DVD and Blu-Ray	
You're the Greatest, Charlie Brown	March 19, 1979	CBS	Apple TV+ (2022–present)	A Charlie Brown Festival CED; Snoopy Double Feature Vol. 1 VHS; A Charlie Brown Christmas (Bonus episode) LaserDisc; You're a Good Sport, Charlie Brown Deluxe Edition (Bonus episode) DVD; It's the Easter Beagle, Charlie Brown iTunes; Peanuts 1970s Collection, Vol. 2 DVD; Charlie Brown and Friends DVD (Repackage of Peanuts 1970s Collection, Vol. 2: DISC 2 ONLY); Peanuts: Emmy Honored Collection DVD; Peanuts: 75th Anniversary Ultimate TV Specials Collection DVD and Blu-Ray	
She's a Good Skate, Charlie Brown	Feb. 25, 1980	CBS	ABC (2010–19), Apple TV+ (2022-present)	Snoopy Double Feature Vol. 7 VHS; Peanuts Specials Vol. 1 iTunes; Happiness Is Peanuts: Snow Days DVD; Peanuts: Emmy Honored Collection DVD; Snoopy's Holiday Collection DVD; Peanuts: 75th Anniversary Ultimate TV Specials Collection DVD and Blu-Ray	
Life Is a Circus, Charlie Brown	Oct. 24, 1980	CBS	Apple TV+ (2023–present)	A Charlie Brown Festival Vol. II CED; Snoopy Double Feature Vol. 9 VHS; Peanuts Specials Vol. 1 iTunes; It's the Easter Beagle, Charlie Brown (UK edition bonus episode) DVD; He's Your Dog, Charlie Brown Deluxe Edition (Bonus episode) DVD; Peanuts: Emmy Honored Collection DVD; Peanuts: 75th Anniversary Ultimate TV Specials Collection DVD and Blu-Ray	
It's Magic, Charlie Brown	April 28, 1981	CBS	Apple TV+ (2023–present)	Snoopy Double Feature Vol. 6 VHS; A Charlie Brown Christmas (Australian edition bonus episode) VHS; It's the Great Pumpkin, Charlie Brown iTunes; It's the Great Pumpkin, Charlie Brown Deluxe Edition (Bonus episode) DVD; It's the Great Pumpkin, Charlie Brown (Bonus episode) Blu-ray; Peanuts: Emmy Honored Collection DVD; Peanuts 70th Anniversary Holiday Collection Limited Edition Blu-Ray; Peanuts Holiday Collection Deluxe Edition 4K Ultra HD and Blu-Ray; Peanuts: 75th Anniversary Ultimate TV Specials Collection DVD and Blu-Ray	
Someday You'll Find Her, Charlie Brown	Oct. 30, 1981	CBS	Apple TV+ (2023–present)	Snoopy Double Feature Vol. 5 VHS; Snoopy Double Feature Vol. 5 LaserDisc; Peanuts Specials Vol. 1 iTunes; A Charlie Brown Valentine (Bonus episode) DVD; A Charlie Brown Valentine (2011 re-issue) (Bonus episode) DVD; Peanuts: Emmy Honored Collection DVD; Peanuts: 75th Anniversary Ultimate TV Specials Collection DVD and Blu-Ray	
A Charlie Brown Celebration	May 24, 1982 (produced in 1981)	CBS	Apple TV+ (2023–present)	A Charlie Brown Celebration VHS; The Charlie Brown and Snoopy Show Vol. 2 (Australian edition bonus episode) DVD; Charlie Brown's All Stars 50th Anniversary Deluxe Edition (Bonus episode) DVD; Peanuts: 75th Anniversary Ultimate TV Specials Collection DVD and Blu-Ray	
Is This Goodbye, Charlie Brown?	Feb. 21, 1983	CBS	Apple TV+ (2023–present)	Is This Goodbye, Charlie Brown? VHS; Peanuts Specials Vol. 1 iTunes; Charlie Brown's Christmas Tales (Bonus episode) DVD; Snoopy's Holiday Collection DVD; Peanuts: Emmy Honored Collection DVD; Peanuts: 75th Anniversary Ultimate TV Specials Collection DVD and Blu-Ray	Only special to premiere on home media first and then television
It's an Adventure, Charlie Brown	May 16, 1983	CBS	Apple TV+ (2023–present)	It's An Adventure, Charlie Brown VHS; The Charlie Brown and Snoopy Show Vol. 2 (Australian edition bonus episode) DVD; Peanuts: 75th Anniversary Ultimate TV Specials Collection DVD and Blu-Ray	
What Have We Learned, Charlie Brown? A Tribute	May 30, 1983 (Memorial Day)	CBS	None	You're Not Elected, Charlie Brown iTunes; What Have We Learned, Charlie Brown? VHS; Peanuts: Emmy Honored Collection DVD; Peanuts: 75th Anniversary Ultimate TV Specials Collection DVD and Blu-Ray	
It's Flashbeagle, Charlie Brown	April 16, 1984	CBS	Apple TV+ (2022–present)	Snoopy Double Feature Vol. 2 VHS; Snoopy Double Feature Vol. 2 LaserDisc; A Charlie Brown Christmas (Bonus episode) iTunes; Snoopy's Reunion Deluxe Edition (Bonus episode) DVD; Snoopy and Friends DVD (Repackage of Snoopy's Reunion); Snoopy's Holiday Collection DVD; Peanuts: Emmy Honored Collection DVD; Peanuts 70th Anniversary Holiday Collection Limited Edition Blu-Ray; Peanuts Holiday Collection Deluxe Edition 4K Ultra HD and Blu-Ray; Peanuts: 75th Anniversary Ultimate TV Specials Collection DVD and Blu-Ray	
Snoopy's Getting Married, Charlie Brown	March 20, 1985	CBS	Apple TV+ (2023–present)	Snoopy Double Feature Vol. 9 VHS; Happiness Is Peanuts: Snoopy's Adventures DVD; Peanuts: Emmy Honored Collection DVD; Peanuts: 75th Anniversary Ultimate TV Specials Collection DVD and Blu-Ray	
You're a Good Man, Charlie Brown	Nov. 6, 1985	CBS	Apple TV+ (2023–present)	You're a Good Man, Charlie Brown VHS; You're a Good Man, Charlie Brown LaserDisc; You're a Good Man, Charlie Brown iTunes; You're a Good Man, Charlie Brown Deluxe Edition DVD; The Charlie Brown and Snoopy Show Vol. 2 (Australian edition bonus episode) DVD; Peanuts: 75th Anniversary Ultimate TV Specials Collection DVD and Blu-Ray	
Happy New Year, Charlie Brown!	Jan. 1, 1986 (New Year's Day) (produced in 1985)	CBS	ABC (2008–19), Apple TV+ (2021–present)	Happy New Year, Charlie Brown! VHS; Happy New Year, Charlie Brown! LaserDisc; Peanuts Holiday Classics iTunes; I Want a Dog for Christmas, Charlie Brown (Bonus episode) iTunes; I Want a Dog for Christmas, Charlie Brown Deluxe Edition (Bonus episode) DVD; Snoopy's Holiday Collection DVD; Peanuts: 75th Anniversary Ultimate TV Specials Collection DVD and Blu-Ray	
Snoopy: The Musical	Jan. 29, 1988	CBS	None	Snoopy!!! The Musical VHS; The Charlie Brown and Snoopy Show Vol. 2 (Australian edition bonus episode) DVD	
It's the Girl in the Red Truck, Charlie Brown	Sept. 27, 1988	CBS	None	It's the Girl in the Red Truck, Charlie Brown VHS	
Why, Charlie Brown, Why?	March 16, 1990	CBS	Apple TV+ (2022–present)	Peanuts Specials Vol. 1 iTunes; Why, Charlie Brown, Why? VHS; You're a Good Man, Charlie Brown (Bonus episode) LaserDisc; Peanuts: Emmy Honored Collection DVD; Peanuts: 75th Anniversary Ultimate TV Specials Collection DVD and Blu-Ray	
Snoopy's Reunion	May 1, 1991 (May Day)	CBS	Apple TV+ (2022–present)	Snoopy Double Feature Vol. 1 VHS; Happy New Year, Charlie Brown! (Bonus episode) LaserDisc; Snoopy's Reunion Deluxe Edition DVD; Snoopy and Friends DVD (Repackage of Snoopy's Reunion); Peanuts: 75th Anniversary Ultimate TV Specials Collection DVD and Blu-Ray	
It's Christmastime Again, Charlie Brown	Nov. 27, 1992	VHS (overall premiere) CBS (television premiere)	Apple TV+ (2021–present)	It's Christmastime Again, Charlie Brown VHS; A Charlie Brown Christmas (bonus episode) iTunes; A Charlie Brown Christmas (bonus episode) DVD; A Charlie Brown Christmas Deluxe Edition (Bonus episode) DVD; A Charlie Brown Christmas 40th Anniversary Deluxe Edition (Bonus episode) DVD; A Charlie Brown Christmas (Bonus episode) Blu-ray; Peanuts 70th Anniversary Holiday Collection Limited Edition Blu-Ray; Peanuts Holiday Collection Deluxe Edition 4K Ultra HD and Blu-Ray; Peanuts: 75th Anniversary Ultimate TV Specials Collection DVD and Blu-Ray	
You're in the Super Bowl, Charlie Brown	Jan. 18, 1994 (produced in 1993)	NBC	None	You're in the Super Bowl, Charlie Brown VHS	Only special to have its premiere on NBC
It's Spring Training, Charlie Brown	Jan. 9, 1996 (produced in 1992)	Unaired	Apple TV+ (2023–present)	Snoopy Double Feature Vol. 8 VHS; Lucy Must Be Traded, Charlie Brown (Bonus episode) DVD; Happiness is ... Peanuts: Go Snoopy Go! DVD; Peanuts: 75th Anniversary Ultimate TV Specials Collection DVD and Blu-Ray	
It Was My Best Birthday Ever, Charlie Brown	Aug. 5, 1997	Unaired	None	It Was My Best Birthday Ever, Charlie Brown VHS; It Was My Best Birthday Ever, Charlie Brown VCD	
It's the Pied Piper, Charlie Brown	Sept. 12, 2000	Unaired	None	It's the Pied Piper, Charlie Brown DVD; It's the Pied Piper, Charlie Brown VHS	
A Charlie Brown Valentine	Feb. 14, 2002 (Valentine's Day)	ABC	ABC (2002–20), Apple TV+ (2023-present)	A Charlie Brown Valentine DVD; A Charlie Brown Valentine (2010 re-issue) DVD; Peanuts: 75th Anniversary Ultimate TV Specials Collection DVD and Blu-Ray	
Charlie Brown's Christmas Tales	Dec. 8, 2002	ABC	ABC (2002–19), Apple TV+ (2022–present)	Charlie Brown Christmas Tales, iTunes; I Want a Dog for Christmas, Charlie Brown (Bonus episode) DVD; Charlie Brown's Christmas Tales, Deluxe Edition DVD; Snoopy's Holiday Collection DVD; Peanuts: 75th Anniversary Ultimate TV Specials Collection DVD and Blu-Ray	First special to premiere on ABC
Lucy Must Be Traded, Charlie Brown	Aug. 29, 2003	ABC	ABC (2003–11), Apple TV+ (2023–present)	Lucy Must Be Traded, Charlie Brown VHS; Lucy Must Be Traded, Charlie Brown DVD; Happiness Is Peanuts: Team Snoopy DVD; It's the Great Pumpkin, Charlie Brown (Bonus episode) iTunes; Peanuts: 75th Anniversary Ultimate TV Specials Collection DVD and Blu-Ray	
I Want a Dog for Christmas, Charlie Brown	Dec. 9, 2003	ABC	ABC (2003–19), Apple TV+ (2022–present)	I Want a Dog for Christmas, Charlie Brown iTunes; I Want a Dog for Christmas, Charlie Brown VHS; I Want a Dog for Christmas, Charlie Brown DVD; I Want a Dog for Christmas, Charlie Brown Deluxe Edition DVD; Snoopy's Holiday Collection DVD; Peanuts: 75th Anniversary Ultimate TV Specials Collection DVD and Blu-Ray	
He's a Bully, Charlie Brown	Nov. 20, 2006	ABC	ABC (2006–07), Apple TV+ (2022–present)	You're Not Elected, Charlie Brown Deluxe Edition (Bonus episode) DVD; He's a Bully, Charlie Brown DVD; You're Not Elected, Charlie Brown (Bonus episode) iTunes; Peanuts: 75th Anniversary Ultimate TV Specials Collection DVD and Blu-Ray	Last special to be produced by Bill Melendez, and last one to premiere on ABC
Happiness Is a Warm Blanket, Charlie Brown	March 29/Oct. 1, 2011 (produced in 2010)	Fox	FOX NOW App, Apple TV+ (2023–present)	Happiness Is a Warm Blanket, Charlie Brown DVD; Happiness Is a Warm Blanket, Charlie Brown iTunes; Happiness Is a Warm Blanket, Charlie Brown Blu-ray; Peanuts: 75th Anniversary Ultimate TV Specials Collection DVD and Blu-Ray	Only special to have its premiere on Fox, the only one to premiere in the 2010s, and the last special to premiere on linear television
Snoopy Presents: For Auld Lang Syne	Dec. 10, 2021	Apple TV+	None		First special to premiere on Apple TV+, in wake of Peanuts specials broadcast rights acquisition by Apple
Snoopy Presents: It's the Small Things, Charlie Brown	April 15, 2022	Apple TV+	None		So far, the most recent special to bear the iconic subtitle "Charlie Brown"
Snoopy Presents: To Mom (and Dad), With Love	May 6, 2022	Apple TV+	None		
Snoopy Presents: Lucy's School	Aug. 12, 2022	Apple TV+	None		
Snoopy Presents: One-of-a-Kind Marcie	Aug. 18, 2023	Apple TV+	None		
Snoopy Presents: Welcome Home, Franklin	Feb. 16, 2024	Apple TV+	None		
Snoopy Presents: A Summer Musical	August 15, 2025	Apple TV+	None		
Snoopy Presents: There's No Place Like Home, Snoopy	July 31, 2026	Apple TV	None		
Snoopy Presents: 12 Days of Snoopy	November 13, 2026	Apple TV	None		

==== Documentary specials ====
Title	Original air date	Network	Release(s) via
A Boy Named Charlie Brown	Spring 1964 (copyrighted in Dec. 1963)	CBS (unaired)	A Boy Named Charlie Brown DVD Only available from the Charles M. Schulz Museum
Charlie Brown and Charles Schulz	May 24, 1969	CBS	Unreleased
Happy Anniversary, Charlie Brown	Jan. 9, 1976	CBS	Unreleased
Happy Birthday, Charlie Brown	Jan. 5, 1979 (produced in 1978)	CBS	Unreleased
Charles M. Schulz,, To Remember	Oct. 8, 1980	PBS	Unreleased
It's Your 20th Television Anniversary, Charlie Brown	May 14, 1985	CBS	Unreleased
You Don't Look 40, Charlie Brown	Feb. 2, 1990	CBS	You Don't Look Forty, Charlie Brown VHS
A&E Biography: Charles Schulz - A Charlie Brown Life	Dec. 25, 1995 (Christmas Day)	A&E	A&E Biography: Charles Schulz - A Charlie Brown Life VHS
Nightline: Good Grief Charles Schulz	Feb. 11, 2000	ABC	Nightline: Good Grief Charles Schulz VHS
Good Grief, Charlie Brown: A Tribute to Charles Schulz	Feb. 11, 2000	CBS	Unreleased
Here's to You, Charlie Brown: 50 Great Years	May 10, 2000	CBS	Unreleased
An Enduring Classic: Peanuts Creator Charles Schulz	Sept. 12, 2000	N/A	It's the Pied Piper, Charlie Brown (bonus episode) DVD
The Making of A Charlie Brown Christmas	Dec. 6, 2001	ABC	I Want a Dog for Christmas, Charlie Brown (bonus episode) DVD
American Masters: Good Ol Charles Schulz'	Oct. 29, 2007	PBS	Unreleased
Unlucky in Love: An Unrequited Love Story	Jan. 15, 2008	N/A	Be My Valentine, Charlie Brown Deluxe Edition (bonus episode) DVD; Peanuts Deluxe Collection (bonus episode) DVD
In Full Bloom: Peanuts at Easter	Feb. 19, 2008	N/A	It's the Easter Beagle, Charlie Brown Deluxe Edition (bonus episode) DVD; Peanuts Deluxe Collection (bonus episode) DVD
We Need a Blockbuster, Charlie Brown	Sept. 2, 2008	N/A	Peanuts Holiday Collection (bonus episode) DVD/Blu-Ray/4K; It's the Great Pumpkin, Charlie Brown: Deluxe Edition (bonus episode) DVD/Blu-Ray'/4K; Peanuts Deluxe Collection (bonus episode) DVD; It's The Great Pumpkin, Charlie Brown: 50th Anniversary Deluxe Edition (bonus episode) DVD; Peanuts 70th Anniversary Holiday Collection Limited Edition Blu-Ray
The Polls Don't Lie: The Making of "You're Not Elected, Charlie Brown"	Oct. 7, 2008	N/A	You're Not Elected, Charlie Brown Deluxe Edition (bonus episode) DVD; You're Not Elected, Charlie Brown / You're A Good Sport, Charlie Brown Double Feature (bonus episode) DVD; Peanuts Deluxe Collection (bonus episode) DVD
Popcorn and Jellybeans: Making a Thanksgiving Classic	Oct. 7, 2008	N/A	Peanuts Holiday Collection (bonus episode) DVD/Blu-Ray/4K; A Charlie Brown Thanksgiving: Deluxe Edition (bonus episode) DVD/Blu-Ray/4K; Peanuts Deluxe Collection (bonus episode) DVD; A Charlie Brown Thanksgiving: 40th Anniversary Deluxe Edition (bonus episode) DVD; Peanuts 70th Anniversary Holiday Collection Limited Edition Blu-Ray
A Christmas Miracle: The Making of "A Charlie Brown Christmas"	Oct. 7, 2008	N/A	Peanuts Holiday Collection (bonus episode) DVD/Blu-Ray/4K; A Charlie Brown Christmas: Deluxe Edition (bonus episode) DVD/Blu-Ray'/4K; Peanuts Deluxe Collection (bonus episode) DVD; A Charlie Brown Christmas: 50th Anniversary Deluxe Edition (bonus episode) DVD; The Peanuts Movie / A Charlie Brown Christmas Double Feature (bonus episode) DVD; Peanuts 70th Anniversary Holiday Collection Limited Edition Blu-Ray
Dust Yourself Off and Pick Yourself Up, Charlie Brown	Jan. 27, 2009	N/A	You're a Good Sport, Charlie Brown Deluxe Edition (bonus episode) DVD; You're Not Elected, Charlie Brown / You're A Good Sport, Charlie Brown Double Feature DVD
Together Again: A Peanuts Voice-Cast Reunion	April 7, 2009	N/A	Snoopy's Reunion Deluxe Edition (bonus episode) DVD; Snoopy and Friends DVD (Repackage of Snoopy's Reunion)
Vince Guaraldi: The Maestro of Menlo Park	July 7, 2009	N/A	Peanuts 1960s Collection (bonus episode) DVD
Sibling Rivalry: Growing Up Van Pelt	Oct. 6, 2009	N/A	I Want a Dog for Christmas, Charlie Brown Deluxe Edition (bonus episode) DVD; Snoopy's Holliday Collection DVD
Woodstock: Creating Snoopy's Sidekick	Oct. 6, 2009	N/A	Peanuts 1970s Collection Vol. 1 (bonus episode) DVD
Animating a Charlie Brown Musical	Jan. 26, 2010	N/A	You're a Good Man, Charlie Brown Deluxe Edition (bonus episode) DVD
You're Groovy, Charlie Brown: A Look at Peanuts in the 70s	June 1, 2010	N/A	Peanuts 1970s Collection Vol. 2 (bonus episode) DVD; Charlie Brown and Friends DVD (Repackage of Peanuts 1970s Collection, Vol. 2: DISC 2 ONLY)
Snoopy's Home Ice: the Story of the Red Wood Empire Ice Arena	Sept. 21, 2010	N/A	He's You're Dog, Charlie Brown Deluxe Edition (bonus episode) DVD
Deconstructing Schulz: From Comic to Screen Play	March 29, 2011	N/A	Happiness is a Warm Blanket, Charlie Brown Deluxe Edition (bonus episode) DVD; Happiness Is a Warm Blanket, Charlie Brown (bonus episode) Blu-ray; Happiness is... Peanuts: 3 Pack Of Fun (bonus episode) DVD
Happiness Is Finding the Right Voice	March 29, 2011	N/A	Happiness is a Warm Blanket, Charlie Brown Deluxe Edition (bonus episode) DVD; Happiness Is a Warm Blanket, Charlie Brown (bonus episode) Blu-ray; Happiness is... Peanuts: 3 Pack Of Fun (bonus episode) DVD
24 Frames a Second: Drawing and Animating a Peanuts Movie	March 29, 2011	N/A	Happiness is a Warm Blanket, Charlie Brown Deluxe Edition (bonus episode) DVD; Happiness Is a Warm Blanket, Charlie Brown (bonus episode) Blu-ray; Happiness is... Peanuts: 3 Pack Of Fun (bonus episode) DVD
Travels with Charlie: The Making of Bon Voyage, Charlie Brown	Oct. 6, 2015	N/A	Bon Voyage, Charlie Brown (and Don't Come Back!!) (bonus featurette) DVD; Bon Voyage, Charlie Brown (and Don't Come Back!!) (bonus featurette) Blu-Ray; Peanuts: 4 - Movie Collection (bonus featurette) DVD; Peanuts: 2 - Movie Collection (bonus featurette) DVD; Snoopy Collection (bonus featurette) Blu-Ray
It's Your 50th Christmas, Charlie Brown	Nov. 30, 2015	ABC	
You Never Grow Up, Charlie Brown	March 8, 2016	N/A	The Peanuts Movie Blu-Ray
Peanuts in Space: Secrets of Apollo 10	May 18, 2019	Apple TV	
It's Not the Holidays without Charlie Brown, Charlie Brown	Oct. 1, 2019	N/A	Peanuts 70th Anniversary Holiday Collection Limited Edition Blu-Ray
Who Are You, Charlie Brown?	June 25, 2021	Apple TV+	

==== DVD collections ====
A series of releases from Warner Home Video, collecting the prime-time TV specials in chronological order of their original production and airing. Each volume of the collection contains six specials on two DVDs, with each volume covering half a decade (the first special was 1965). All 1960s/1970s specials are included in these collections except the documentary specials. The Emmy-Honored ‘Peanuts’ Collection contains 11 specials (From the late 70s to early 90s) that have earned or won an Emmy Award.

Title	Release date
Peanuts 1960s Collection	July 7, 2009
Peanuts 1970s Collection, Vol. 1	Oct. 20, 2009
Peanuts 1970s Collection, Vol. 2	June 1, 2010
Peanuts Emmy Honored Collection	Sept. 15, 2015

=== The Charlie Brown and Snoopy Show ===
The Charlie Brown and Snoopy Show is an American animated television series featuring characters and storylines from the comic strip Peanuts as first presented for television in the Peanuts animated specials. It aired Saturday mornings on the CBS network from 1983 to 1985.

=== This Is America, Charlie Brown mini-series ===
This Is America, Charlie Brown is an eight-part animated television miniseries that depicts a series of events in American history featuring characters from the Charles M. Schulz comic strip Peanuts. It aired from 1988 to 1989 on CBS. The first four episodes aired as a weekly series in October and November 1988; the final four episodes aired monthly from February to May 1989.

=== Peanuts 2014 TV series ===
Peanuts is an animated television series adapted for the screen and directed by Alexis Lavillat. The series first aired in France on November 9, 2014, and later began airing in the United States on Cartoon Network and Boomerang on May 9, 2016, as interstitial shorts.

=== Snoopy in Space ===
Snoopy in Space is a 2019 animated television series inspired by the Peanuts comic strip by Charles M. Schulz. Developed by Mark Evestaff and Betsy Walters, and produced by WildBrain Studios, the show debuted on November 1, 2019, on Apple TV+.

=== The Snoopy Show ===
The Snoopy Show is a 2021 animated streaming television series inspired by the Peanuts comic strip by Charles M. Schulz. Developed by Rob Boutilier, Mark Evestaff, and Alex Galatis, and produced by WildBrain, it debuted on February 5, 2021, on Apple TV+. Each episode consists of three 7-minute segments. Season 2 premiered with the first half on March 11, 2022, while the next half of the season premiered on August 12, 2022. A holiday special was released on December 2, 2022. Season 3 was released on June 9, 2023.

=== Camp Snoopy ===
Camp Snoopy is a 26 episode animated streaming series which debuted on June 14, 2024 on Apple TV+. Camp Snoopy was renewed on July 25, 2024, for a second season. Season 2 was released on June 26, 2026.

=== Other specials ===
Title	Original air date	Network
Snoopy at the Ice Follies	Oct. 24, 1971	NBC
Snoopy's International Ice Follies	Nov. 12, 1972	NBC
Snoopy Directs the Ice Follies	Nov. 13, 1973	NBC
Snoopy's Musical on Ice	May 24, 1978	CBS
The Big Stuffed Dog	Feb. 8, 1981	NBC

=== Peanuts Motion Comics ===
Peanuts Motion Comics is a mini-series of animated cartoon shorts based on 1964 strips of Charles Schulz' comic strip, Peanuts. The series premiered on iTunes on November 3, 2008, with the support of the Schulz estate. The first season consists of 20 cartoon shorts, paired into 10 episodes. The episodes employ signature themes and plotlines from the classic strips. The first season was released to DVD on March 9, 2010. Animation production was done by Studio B Productions.

== Educational films ==
The Peanuts characters have also appeared in educational videos, which were produced in the 1970s and 1980s and distributed on 16mm film to schools.

Title	Release date	Release(s) via
Tooth Brushing	1978	
Clean the Air	1979	
It's Dental Flossophy, Charlie Brown	1980	

== Web series ==
This webseries is a series of short animations hosted on the official Peanuts YouTube "Snoopy" channel. It consists of 40 separate clips ranging from around 57 seconds to over 3 minutes long (Intro and End Title included).

The table below lists the clips in the order which they first appear, whether individually, or included in a compilation, under the first name they are given. Some of the individual clip names change as they are repeated in (many) compilations (see next table), and a handful have no given title – these are marked below with an * and are not 'official' names.

For episode 11 it is worth noting that the pun on Fyodor Dostoevsky's name is spelled incorrectly as 'Dogtoyevkey'.

No. in season	Clip Title	Original Upload Date
1	Carousel: The Trouble with Charlie Brown	August 11, 2018
2	101 Football: Catch it, Charlie Brown	August 25, 2018
3	Poor Chuck A Letter to Charlie Brown	September 8, 2018
4	Lucy vs Schroeder's Piano Sewer or Later	September 22, 2018
5	Get Well Soon Charlie Brown	September 29, 2018
6	Plane and Simple Smart Charlie Brown	October 6, 2018
7	Snoopy, Woodstock and the Football Game	October 13, 2018
8	* Woodstock Sings Everyone's a Critic	October 13, 2018
9	* Snoopy and Woodstock Downside Up	October 13, 2018
10	Snoopy and Woodstock Severe Weather	October 13, 2018
11	Once upon a time… Dogtoyevkey!	October 20, 2018
12	Nights Watch Snoopy is Scared of the Dark	October 27, 2018
13	Nights Watch Peanuts on Ice	December 25, 2018
14	Nights Watch - Crabby New Year	January 1, 2019
15	Ewe First	January 15, 2019
16	Cyrano Brown	January 15, 2019
17	School Daze	February 12, 2019
18	Balloon Bother	February 12, 2019
19	Dusty Dancing	February 21, 2019
20	Heart Attack	February 23, 2019
21	Public Speaking	February 28, 2019
22	Restaurant Wars	March 9, 2019
23	The Hedge Toad	March 16, 2019
24	Revenge is Sweetie	March 16, 2019
25	Seesaw	March 25, 2019
26	Snoopy and Woodstock The Show	June 8, 2019
27	* Snoopy and Woodstock Birdbath	June 8, 2019
28	Snoopy and Woodstock Hot Air Balloon	June 8, 2019
29	Snoopy and Woodstock The Baseball Game (AKA Homerun)	June 18, 2019
30	Snoopy and Woodstock Rollerskates	June 18, 2019
31	Rainclouds	June 18, 2019
32	Woodstock Whistles into the Wind	June 29, 2019
33	Snoopy Gives Woodstock a Helicopter Ride	June 29, 2019
34	Woodstock tries Olympic Diving	August 8, 2019
35	Sleep Snacking	August 11, 2019
36	Snoopy and Woodstock Song in your Heart	August 17, 2019
37	Snoopy and Woodstock Snoopy the Tree	October 5, 2019
38	* Snoopy and Woodstock Nest	October 5, 2019
39	* Snoopy and Woodstock Sled	October 12, 2019
40	Snoopy and Woodstock Play Hockey	October 12, 2019

=== Web Series Compilations ===
Below is the list, in uploaded order, of Compilation Episodes of the above Web Series clips. All individual 'clip' numbers are taken from the above list. Some of the compilations have their own distinct name, others are named for a clip included in the compilation. Just to throw a spanner in the works, not every 'titled' compilation is named for the first clip - and the names for some individual clips are known solely because of the name of the compilation.

Of all of the 40 individual clips from this Web Series, only one is unused in any of the compilations - No.16 'Cyrano Brown'.

The focus of these compilation videos becomes Snoopy (and Woodstock) very quickly, as is seen by the fact that 5 clips are used in almost 50% of the 39 compilation Episodes. Each of them featuring Snoopy and Woodstock
Clip No. 8 : 'Woodstock Sings!: Everyone's a critic (AKA 'Snoopy and Woodstock Write Music')
Clip No. 25: 'Snoopy and Woodstock Seesaw
Clip No. 29: 'Snoopy and Woodstock Play Baseball'
Clip No. 31: 'Rainclouds'
Clip No. 35: 'Sleep Snacking'
Each of the above appears 18 times in the compilations.

Episode No.	Title	Uploaded Date	Clips Included	Notes
1	Plane and Simple Charlie Brown	October 6, 2018	6 / 1 / 5 / 2 / 3 / 4	First six episodes. Episode is named for the 1st clip (No: 6). Episode has strange chapter titles all relating to Charlie Brown.
2	Snoopy, Woodstock and the Football Game	October 13, 2018	7 / 8 / 9 / 10	Next four episodes. Episode is named for the 1st clip (No: 7).
3	Once Upon a Time... Dogtoyevkey!	October 20, 2018	11 / 2 / 3 / 4 / 1 / 5	The name "Dogtoyevkey" is a pun of the writer Fyodor Dostoevsky, but the last part has been spelled incorrectly. Episode is named for the 1st clip (No: 11).
4	Nights Watch Snoopy is Scared of the Dark	October 27, 2018	12 / 6 / 3 / 5 / 1 / 2 / 4	Episode is named for the 1st clip (No: 12).
5	Peanuts Animation Compilation 1	April 30, 2019	1 / 5 / 2 / 3 / 15	First compilation with no new clips.
6	Peanuts Animation Compilation 2	May 2, 2019	6 / 17 / 4 / 18 / 14 / 19	No new clips.
7	Peanuts Animation Compilation 3	May 4, 2019	11 / 20 / 12 / 21 / 22	No new clips.
8	Peanuts Animation Compilation 4	May 9, 2019	23 / 24 / 13 / 20 / 4 / 15	No new clips. Odd chapter names, all naming Snoopy, despite him not appearing in all of them.
9	Full Episodes Compilation	June 8, 2019	26 / 27 / 25 / 28	Notes = First compilation to have 3 previously unseen clips (Nos: 26, 27 and 28) Clip No:27-'Birdbath' has no official title.
10	Snoopy Goes Skating and More	June 18, 2019	29 / 30 / 31	Compilation composed of three new clips. The next upload after this compilation was a solo upload of Clip No.29 -'Snoopy and Woodstock Play Baseball' - the first clip from this compilation.
11	Snoopy and Woodstock's Show	June 25, 2019	30 / 26 / 25 / 29 / 27 / 28 / 31	Named for 2nd clip in this compilation (No. 26)
12	Woodstock's Hot Air Balloon	August 3, 2019	3 / 8 / 28 / 26 / 30 / 25 / 29 / 31 / 27	Named after the 3rd clip in this compilation (No. 28)
13	Sleep Snaking	August 10, 2019	35 / 26 / 29 / 36	Two new Clips (35 and 36). Named after the 1st clip (No. 35)
14	Song in Your Heart	August 17, 2019	36 / 26 / 35 / 39 / 30	Named after the new first clip (No.36)
15	Homerun	September 19, 2019	29 / 26 / 8 / 9 / 33	No new clips. Compilation named with an alternate title for clip No.29
16	Severe Weather	September 28, 2019	10 / 27 / 7 / 28 / 35 / 36	No new clips. Named for clip No.10
17	Whistling in the Wind	October 5, 2019	32 / 30 / 37 / 31 / 38	Two new clips (Nos: 37 & 38). Clip No.38 -'Nest'- has no official title
18	Rainclouds	October 12, 2019	31 / 39 / 40 / 38 / 25 / 34	This is the last upload to date to include any new clips (Nos: 39 and 40). This compilation gives a name to clip No:31. Clip No.39-'Sled'-has no official title. Clip No.40 (the last original clip created) is not given a title until the penultimate compilation upload. (To date)
19	Snoopy and Woodstock Compilation 1	July 23, 2020	29 / 9 / 8 / 7 / 28 / 35 / 40 / 34	From this upload the Wild Brain logo is changed. There are no new clips, either singly, or included in any of the compilations, uploaded from this point onward (to date).
20	Snoopy and Woodstock Compilation 2	July 30, 2020	27 / 9 / 30 / 35 / 32 / 7 / 34 / 37 / 40	
21	Snoopy and Woodstock Compilation 3	August 6, 2020	29 / 26 / 10 / 36 / 28 / 38 / 33 / 8 / 25	
22	Snoopy and Woodstock Compilation 4	August 13, 2020	8 / 9 / 35 / 25 / 7 / 26 / 29 / 38	
23	Snoopy and Woodstock Compilation 5	August 20, 2020	34 / 36 / 40 / 28 / 37 / 32 / 27 / 10 / 33	
24	Woodstock and the Rain Cloud	December 10, 2019	31 / 29 / 37 / 8 / 25 / 10 / 7 / 36 / 28 / 40 / 35 / 34 / 27 / 30 / 38	First of the extended (15 clip) compilations. Gives another new name for clip No.31. This compilation is repeated under a different name below (episode 35).
25	Snoopy the Tree	December 17, 2019	37 / 31 / 8 / 38 / 9 / 28 / 36 / 33 / 10 / 26 / 34 / 25 / 32 / 30 / 40	This compilation gives a name to clip No.37. This compilation is repeated under the name "Snoopy Tree" below (Episode 33)
26	Peanuts on Ice	December 24, 2020	13 / 14	A two part compilation consisting of clips No.13 and 14 - which is reversed for the next upload.
27	A Crabby New Year	December 31, 2020	14 / 13	A two part compilation consisting of clips No.14 and 13 - which is reversed from the previous upload.
28	Woodstock Wakes Snoopy Up	January 7, 2021	36 / 30 / 26 / 37 / 31 / 40 / 10 / 35 / 9 / 33 / 31 / 25 / 8 / 29	This compilation gives an alternate name to clip No.36. This compilation is uploaded again, under the same name, as Episode 34.
29	Snoopy and Woodstock Through the Seasons	January 14, 2021	10 / 40 / 31 / 36 / 26 / 33 / 32 / 27 / 38 / 25 / 35 / 30 / 7 / 37 / 9	This compilation gives an alternate title to clip No.10
30	Snoopy Flies	January 22, 2021	28 / 33 / 37 / 36 / 34 / 26 / 8 / 40 / 10 / 31 / 27 / 35 / 29 / 25 / 7	This compilation is repeated as Episode 32 under the title 'Snoopy Goes Flying' - minus the last clip (clip No.7). The first of the new Web Series "Take Care with Peanuts" premiered 4 days after this compilation was uploaded
31	Rollerskating Snoopy	January 29, 2021	30 / 31 / 27 / 7 / 9 / 40 / 38 / 36 / 35 / 25 / 29 / 37 / 10 / 8	This compilation gives an alternate title to clip No.30
32	Rollerblading with Snoopy	July 13, 2021	30 / 31 / 27 / 7 / 9 / 40 / 38 / 36 / 35 / 25 / 29 / 37 / 10 / 8	This compilation is a renamed repeat of Episode 31. This compilation gives a 2nd alternate title to clip No.30
33	Snoopy goes Flying	July 24, 2021	28 / 33 / 37 / 36 / 34 / 26 / 8 / 40 / 10 / 31 / 27 / 35 / 29 / 25	This compilation is a renamed repeat of Episode 30, but minus clip No.7
34	Snoopy Tree	August 12, 2021	37 / 31 / 8 / 38 / 9 / 28 / 36 / 33 / 10 / 26 / 34 / 25 / 32 / 30 / 40	This compilation is a renamed repeat of Episode 25
35	Woodstock Wakes Snoopy Up	September 11, 2021	36 / 30 / 26 / 37 / 31 / 40 / 10 / 35 / 9 / 33 / 31 / 25 / 8 / 29	Duplicate upload of Episode 28
36	Woodstock's Rain Cloud	September 18, 2021	31 / 29 / 37 / 8 / 25 / 10 / 7 / 36 / 28 / 40 / 35 / 34 / 27 / 30 / 38	This compilation gives a 3rd title to clip No.31. This upload is a renamed repeat of Episode 24
37	Snoopy and Woodstock Play Baseball	September 25, 2021	29 / 9 / 8 / 7 / 28 / 35 / 40 / 34	This compilation gives a title to clip No.29. This compilation is an exact duplicate of Episode 19
38	Snoopy and Woodstock Play Hockey	October 2, 2021	27 / 9 / 30 / 35 / 32 / 7 / 34 / 37 / 40	This compilation title is taken from the last included clip, which was also the last unique clip created. It also gives that last clip (clip No.40.) a name. This compilation is an exact duplicate of Episode 20
39	Snoopy and Woodstock Write Music	October 9, 2021	8 / 9 / 35 / 25 / 7 / 26 / 29 / 38	This compilation is an exact duplicate of Episode 22. To date - this is the last of this Web Series which was supplanted by the Web Series, "Take Care with Peanuts".

== Take Care with Peanuts (Web series) ==
A series of 'Well-being' shorts, hosted on the official Peanuts YouTube Channel

No. in season	Title	OriginalAirDate	ShortSummary
1	"Join the Gang"	January 26, 2021	
The Peanuts Gang return in a themed series of shorts, created to "remind us to press pause and appreciate ourselves, those around us, and this place we call home."
2	"Charlie Brown's Caring Tree"	February 9, 2021	
3	"Find Your Voice"	March 16, 2021	
4	"Choose to Reuse"	April 1, 2021	
5	"Feel Better"	May 11, 2021	
6	"Get Up and Grow"	June 1, 2021	
7	"Move Your Own Way"	July 6, 2021	
8	"Friends, Big and Small"	August 10, 2021	
9	"Learning is Everywhere"	September 7, 2021	
10	"Happy Harvesting"	October 5, 2021	
11	"Treat a Friend"	November 9, 2021	
12	"Pass It Along"	December 14, 2021	
13	"Stick With It"	January 11, 2022	
14	"Speak from the Heart"	February 8, 2022	
15	"Fun for All Seasons"	March 15, 2022	
16	"We Need our Trees"	April 12, 2022	
17	"Just Breathe"	May 10, 2022	
18	"A Friend is Someone Who Listens"	June 14, 2022	
19	"Shine On, Charlie Brown"	July 12, 2022	
20	"Growing Older, Getting Wiser"	August 10, 2022	
21	"Start with a Clean Slate"	September 13, 2022	
22	"Jump Into Fall"	October 11, 2022	
23	"Get Up and Get Outside"	November 15, 2022	
24	"Give the Gift of Fun"	December 13, 2022	
25	"Set Your Own Goals"	January 10, 2023	
26	"Appreciate What You Have"	February 13, 2023	
27	"Be Aware of What's Fair"	March 14, 2023	
28	"Be Wise with Supplies"	April 11, 2023	
29	"Let Nature Lift Your Spirits"	May 9, 2023	
30	"Show Support"	June 13, 2023	
31	"Help a Friend, Help Yourself"	July 11, 2023	
32	"Know How to Keep Cool"	August 8, 2023	
33	"Lean Into Learning"	September 12, 2023	
34	"Stick Together"	October 10, 2023	
35	"Be a Good Sport"	November 14, 2023	
36	"Think Inside the Box"	December 12, 2023	
37	"Take Someone Under Your Wing"	January 9, 2024	
38	"Get Involved!"	February 13, 2024	
39	"Reduce, Reuse, Recycle, Repeat"	April 9, 2024	
40	"Make the Most of Your Day"	June 11, 2024	
41	"See What's Out There"	September 10, 2024	
42	"A Little Thanks Goes a Long Way"	November 12, 2024	
43	"Make Up for Your Mess"	April 9, 2025	
44	"Share the Journey"	May 7, 2025	
45	"When in Doubt, Dance"	September 11, 2025	
46	"Make it through the rain"	October 7, 2025	
47	"Reach out to a friend"	November 14, 2025	

== Musicals ==
Title	Debuted	Written by
You're a Good Man, Charlie Brown	1967, Off-Broadway	Clark Gesner
Snoopy: The Musical	1975, San Francisco	Larry Grossman; Hal Hackady
A Charlie Brown Christmas	2013	Eric Schaeffer

== Video games ==
Title	Platform(s)	Release date
Snoopy Tennis	Game & Watch	1982
Snoopy	Game & Watch	1983
Snoopy and the Red Baron	Atari 2600	1983
Charlie Brown ABC's	Commodore 64	1984
Snoopy	Commodore 64	1984
Snoopy to the Rescue	Commodore 64	1984
Peanuts Maze Marathon	Commodore 64	1984
Peanuts Picture Puzzler	Commodore 64	1984
Charlie Brown's 1-2-3's	Apple II	1985
Typing is a Ball, Charlie Brown	Commodore 64	1985
Snoopy's Reading Machine	Commodore 64	1985
Snoopy: The Cool Computer Game	MS-DOS	1989
Snoopy's Magic Show	Game Boy	1990
Snoopy's Silly Sports Spectacular	NES	1990
Snoopy's Game Club	MS-DOS	1992
Snoopy Concert (Japan only)	Super Famicom	1995
Get Ready for School, Charlie Brown!	Windows	1995
Snoopy no Gakugeikai スヌーピーの学芸会 (Japan only)	Pico	1995
Snoopy no Hajimete no Otsukai スヌーピーの初めてのお使い (Japan only)	Game Boy (Super Game Boy)	1996
Ongaku Daisuki Snoopy 音楽大好きスヌーピー (Japan only)	Pico	1996
Snoopy's Campfire Stories	Windows	1996
Snoopy Tennis	Game Boy Color	2001
Where's the Blanket, Charlie Brown?	Windows and Mac OS)	2002
Snoopy vs. the Red Baron	PlayStation 2, PlayStation Portable, Windows	2006
Charlie Brown All-Stars	PlayStation 2	2007
It's the Big Game, Charlie Brown!	Windows and Mac OS	2007
Snoopy to Issho ni DS Eigo Lesson (Japan only)	Nintendo DS	2007
Snoopy DS: Let's Go Meet Snoopy and His Friends! (Japan only)	Nintendo DS	2008
Snoopy no Aiken DS: Chitte Okitai Inu no Koto - Inu no Nouryoku - Anata no Shitsuke スヌーピーの愛犬 DS: ちっておきたい犬の事 犬ののうりょく あなたのしつけ (Japan only)	Nintendo DS	2009
Snoopy Flying Ace	Xbox 360	2010
Snoopy's Street Fair	Android, iOS	2011
A Charlie Brown Christmas!	Android, iOS	2013
Charlie Brown's All Stars!	Android, iOS	2013
It's the Great Pumpkin, Charlie Brown	Android, iOS	2013
Snoopy Coaster	Android, iOS	2013
Snoopy's Candy Town	Android, iOS	2013
Snoopy's Sugar Drop	Android, iOS	2014
Snoopy's Grand Adventure	Nintendo 3DS, Wii U, PlayStation 4, Xbox 360, Xbox One	2015
THE PEANUTS MOVIE OFFICIAL APP	Android, iOS	2016
Snoopy's Town Tale - City Building Simulator	Android, iOS	2016
Snoopy Pop	Android, iOS	2017
What's Up, Snoopy?	Android, iOS	2017
Snoopy Spot the Difference	Android, iOS	2018
SNOOPY Puzzle Journey	Android, iOS	2020
Snoopy & The Great Mystery Club	Switch, Xbox Series X, PS5	2025

== Commercials ==
Brand	Year
Cheerios	(1984–1986)
MetLife	(1980s–2010s)
Ford Motor Company	(1959–1960s)
Chex Mix	(1989-2025)
Milk Bone	(1997)
Smuckers	(1994)
Friendly's	(1995)
Regina Steamer	(1994)
Dolly Madison	(1970s–1980s)
Webers Bread	(1960s–1980s)
All Nippon Airways	(1980s, Japan)
McDonald's	(2000, Japan)
Deutsche Bundespost	(1980s–1990s, Germany)
