= Snoopy DS: Let's Go Meet Snoopy and His Friends! =

2008 video game

- Developer: Square Enix
- Publisher: Square Enix
- Platform: Nintendo DS
- Release: JP: October 9, 2008
- Genre: Action
- Mode: Single-player

Snoopy DS: Let's Go Meet Snoopy and His Friends (Snoopy DS スヌーピーと仲間たちに会いにいこう！, Snoopy DS: Snoopy to Nakama Tachi ni Ai ni Ikou!) is a game developed by Square Enix for the Nintendo DS and released in Japan on October 9, 2008 as the third Japan-exclusive Peanuts video game, after Snoopy Concert and the sequel to Snoopy's Magic Show. It was released by a new brand called "Pure Dreams" to target the casual, family oriented video game market.

The game consists of several minigames covering a variety of gameplay types, linked together by a world in which the player can talk to Peanuts characters and perform simple quests for them. The game was praised in previews for its adherence to the Peanuts art style, as well as for some of the minigames, but not for its connecting world.

== Gameplay ==
The game utilizes the Nintendo DS's upper screen for action and the lower screen for mapping and item collection

The game begins with characters starting in their own rooms. Players create a unique Peanuts character to interact with other characters from the Peanuts universe and play minigames, the main focus of the game. "Beagle scouts", in which the player guides Woodstock through the woods to safety, a sidescrolling shooter starring Snoopy flying a plane against the Red Baron, billiards, surfing and card games are some of the minigames available. The player interacts with characters, each of which has a variety of responses, and performs tasks for them in order to progress and unlock more of the story and new minigames. The game references several points of Peanuts lore, such as The Great Pumpkin and other stories from Peanuts comics, as well as the television cartoon's artistic style, including the Peanuts piano theme.

== Development ==
The game was revealed on July 31, 2008 along with Pingu's Wonderful Carnival as a part of Square-Enix new brand "Pure Dreams", in an effort to reach females, younger gamers, and families. The game was a playable demo at the 2008 Tokyo Game Show

== Reception ==
The game was released in Japan on October 9, 2008.

1UP.com praised the game for its "authentic Peanuts" style, and enjoyed some of the simple minigames, but did not enjoy the fetch quests and extensive dialogue, especially since it was in Japanese. Square Enix also started selling Peanuts figurines from their online store. Famitsu rated the game 24 of 40.
