= Play It Again, Charlie Brown =

1971 Peanuts animated television special

- Genre: Animated television special
- Based on: Peanuts by Charles M. Schulz
- Written by: Charles M. Schulz
- Directed by: Bill Melendez
- Voices of: Danny Hjelm; Pamelyn Ferdin; Stephen Shea; Lynda Mendelson; Hilary Momberger; Christopher DeFaria; Chris Inglis
- Music by: Vince Guaraldi
- Opening theme: "Piano Sonata No. 3 in C Major, Opus 2, No. 3; I: Allegro Con Brio"
- Ending theme: "Play It Again, Charlie Brown"
- Country of origin: United States
- Original language: English

Production
- Producers: Lee Mendelson; Bill Melendez
- Editors: Bob Gillis; Chuck McCann; Rudy Zamora, Jr.
- Running time: 25 minutes
- Production companies: Lee Mendelson Film Productions; Bill Melendez Productions

Original release
- Network: CBS
- Release: March 28, 1971

Related
- It Was a Short Summer, Charlie Brown (1969); You're Not Elected, Charlie Brown (1972)

Play It Again, Charlie Brown is the seventh prime-time animated TV special based upon the comic strip Peanuts, by Charles M. Schulz. It originally aired on CBS on March 28, 1971.

This was the first Peanuts TV special of the 1970s, airing nearly a year and a half after It Was a Short Summer, Charlie Brown. (The feature film A Boy Named Charlie Brown had been released in between the two specials.) It was also the first special to focus on a character other than Charlie Brown or Snoopy.

It also marked the first time someone other than Peter Robbins voiced Charlie Brown, which in this case was Chris Inglis as the character, since Robbins' voice deepened after the previous special. Also, all the other remaining original actors from the first special, except for Bill Melendez, were replaced by someone else. This left Bill Melendez as the only original actor remaining, until his death on September 2, 2008. However, recordings of his voice were used in later Peanuts animated media.

== Plot ==
Lucy repeatedly attempts to capture Schroeder's attention as he practices diligently on his toy piano. True to character, Schroeder remains entirely focused on his music, particularly the works of Ludwig von Beethoven, and shows no interest in Lucy's persistent romantic overtures. Frustrated by his indifference, Lucy devises a plan that she believes will both elevate Schroeder's musical talents and bring him closer to her.

She arranges for Schroeder to perform at the school's upcoming PTA meeting, hoping that a public performance will garner admiration for him and, by extension, for her efforts. Upon learning of the invitation, Schroeder is initially apprehensive but ultimately agrees, under the impression that he will be allowed to present selections from the classical repertoire he so reveres.

However, on the day of the performance, Schroeder is taken aback to discover that the PTA organizers expect him to play popular or contemporary music instead of classical pieces. They regard Beethoven and other classical composers as outdated and unsuitable for the event's tone. Schroeder, deeply offended and unwilling to compromise his artistic principles, refuses to alter his program. Lucy attempts to persuade him to conform to the PTA's expectations, but Schroeder remains resolute in his decision. The disagreement culminates in the cancellation of the recital. Lucy is left disappointed, her well-intentioned plan having failed to achieve either artistic success or emotional connection.

Lucy makes one last appeal to Schroeder, who, undeterred by the day's events, resumes playing his piano in solitude.

== Voice cast ==
- Danny Hjelm as Schroeder
- Pamelyn Ferdin as Lucy van Pelt
- Stephen Shea as Linus van Pelt
- Lynda Mendelson as Frieda
- Hilary Momberger as Sally Brown
- Chris Inglis as Charlie Brown and Pig-Pen
- Kip DeFaria as Peppermint Patty

== Music score ==
Most music cues for Play It Again, Charlie Brown consist of works composed by Ludwig van Beethoven and performed by harpsichordist Lillian Steuber. Eight different piano sonatas and one symphony appear in the television special.

Remaining cues were divided between Vince Guaraldi and Harry Bluestone and are noted as such. The score was recorded by the Vince Guaraldi Quartet on October 23 and in Winter 1970 at Western Recorders. Guaraldi was joined by Herb Ellis on guitar, Charles Berghofer on bass, and Dick Shanahan on drums; with orchestration by John Scott Trotter.

Trotter would go on to receive an Emmy nomination for his work on the special in 1972.

1. Piano Sonata No. 3 in C Major, Opus 2: I. Allegro Con Brio (three separate cues)
2. "Stupid Beagle" (John Scott Trotter)
3. Piano Sonata No. 3 in C Major, Opus 2: I. Allegro Con Brio (three separate cues)
4. Symphony No. 5 in C Minor, Opus 67: I. Allegro Con Brio
5. Piano Sonata No. 4 in E♭ Major, Opus 7: III. Allegro, 3/4; "Trio" in E♭ minor
6. "Play It Again, Charlie Brown" (aka "Charlie's Blues" and "Charlie Brown Blues") (electric version) (Vince Guaraldi)
7. Piano Sonata No. 10 in G Major, Opus 14, No. 2: I. Allegro in G major (two separate cues)
8. "Oh, Good Grief" (Vince Guaraldi, Lee Mendelson)
9. Piano Sonata No, 14 in C♯ minor ("Moonlight Sonata"), Opus 27, No. 2: II. Allegretto
10. Piano Sonata No, 14 in C♯ minor ("Moonlight Sonata"), Opus 27, No. 2: III. Presto agitato
11. "Lucifer's Lady" (Vince Guaraldi)
12. Piano Sonata No. 21 in C Major ("Waldstein"), Opus 53: III. Rondo. Allegretto moderato – Prestissimo
13. "Peppermint Patty" (electric band version) (Vince Guaraldi)
14. Piano Sonata No. 20 in G Major, Opus 49, No. 2: I. Allegro ma non troppo, 2/4
15. Piano Sonata No. 25 in G Major, Opus 79: I. Presto alla tedesca
16. "Happy, Happy" (acid rock-style jam) (Vince Guaraldi)
17. "Charlie's Rock" (John Scott Trotter)
18. "Tune Up No. 1"
19. "Charlie's Rock" (John Scott Trotter)
20. "Play It Again, Charlie Brown" (slow version sans percussion) (Vince Guaraldi)
21. Tune Up No. 2: "My Dog Has Fleas"
22. "Happy" (Harry Bluestone)
23. Piano Sonata No. 29 in B♭ Major ("Hammerklavier"), Opus 106: I. Allegro
24. "Play It Again, Charlie Brown" (acid rock version) (Vince Guaraldi)

No official soundtrack for Play It Again, Charlie Brown has been released. However, recording session master tapes for seven 1970s-era Peanuts television specials scored by Vince Guaraldi were discovered by his son, David Guaraldi, in the mid-2000s. A version of the program's eponymous song featured in There's No Time for Love, Charlie Brown (1973) was released in 2007 on the compilation album, Vince Guaraldi and the Lost Cues from the Charlie Brown Television Specials.

== Home media ==
On October 7, 2025, the special was released on the DVD and Blu-Ray collection Peanuts: 75th Anniversary Ultimate TV Specials Collection along with 39 other Peanuts specials.
