= A Charlie Brown Thanksgiving =

1973 television special

- Genre: Animated television special
- Based on: Peanuts by Charles M. Schulz
- Written by: Charles M. Schulz
- Directed by: Bill Melendez; Phil Roman
- Voices of: Todd Barbee; Stephen Shea; Hilary Momberger; Robin Kohn; Christopher DeFaria; Jimmy Ahrens; Robin Reed
- Music by: Vince Guaraldi
- Opening theme: "Thanksgiving Theme"
- Ending theme: "Thanksgiving Theme" (third reprise)
- Country of origin: United States
- Original language: English

Production
- Producers: Lee Mendelson; Bill Melendez
- Editors: Bob Gillis; Chuck McCann; Rudy Zamora
- Running time: 25 minutes
- Production companies: Lee Mendelson Film Productions; Bill Melendez Productions

Original release
- Network: CBS
- Release: November 20, 1973

Related
- There's No Time for Love, Charlie Brown (1973); It's a Mystery, Charlie Brown (1974)

A Charlie Brown Thanksgiving is a 1973 American television special based upon the comic strip Peanuts, by Charles M. Schulz. The tenth prime-time animated Peanuts television special, it originally aired on the CBS network on November 20, 1973 and won an Emmy Award the following year. It was the third holiday special after A Charlie Brown Christmas in 1965 and It's the Great Pumpkin, Charlie Brown in 1966. Except for the opening football gag, it is the first Peanuts TV special to have a completely original script without derivation from the strip.

== Plot ==
Lucy encourages Charlie Brown to try and kick her football to honor the tradition of Thanksgiving football, then as usual pulls the ball away just before Charlie Brown reaches it and tells him that some traditions fade away.

Charlie Brown and his sister, Sally, discuss their lack of enthusiasm for the holidays, Charlie Brown because of his usual holiday-related depression, and Sally because she only sees it as a reason for schoolteachers to assign her essays, her mood changes when Linus arrives to explain Thanksgiving's importance. As the Browns prepare to go to their grandmother's for Thanksgiving dinner, Charlie Brown gets a phone call from Peppermint Patty, whose father is out of town so she invites herself — and soon after, Marcie and Franklin — to the Browns' house for Thanksgiving, even though Charlie Brown is not having dinner there nor can he cook anything beyond "maybe toast." Linus suggests that they have time before the Browns' Thanksgiving to prepare a Thanksgiving dinner for their friends and recruits Snoopy and Woodstock to help; Snoopy sets up a ping pong table and chairs outside. Charlie Brown, Snoopy, Woodstock and Linus then prepare a feast of toast, pan-fried popcorn, pretzel sticks, jelly beans and sundaes.

Once the friends arrive, Linus says a grace based on the First Thanksgiving and Snoopy deals the plates like a casino dealer. An enraged Peppermint Patty rejects the meal for not including traditional foods. Marcie reminds Peppermint Patty that she invited herself to the meal. Peppermint Patty humbly asks Marcie to apologize to Charlie Brown on her behalf (unintentionally paralleling The Courtship of Miles Standish). Marcie reluctantly agrees, but Peppermint Patty soon follows and apologizes directly. Charlie Brown calls his grandmother to explain why his family is late to dinner; she invites all his friends to join them. On the drive over, they sing "Over the River and Through the Wood"; Charlie Brown remarks the one thing wrong with a song about "grandmother's house:" his lives in a condominium. Back at Snoopy's doghouse, he and Woodstock partake in a surprisingly more traditional meal just among themselves.

== Voice cast ==
- Todd Barbee as Charlie Brown
  - Peter Robbins as Charlie Brown's screaming voice (archived)
- Robin Kohn as Lucy van Pelt
- Stephen Shea as Linus van Pelt
- Hilary Momberger as Sally Brown
- Christopher DeFaria as Peppermint Patty
- Jimmy Ahrens as Marcie
- Robin Reed as Franklin
- Bill Melendez as Snoopy and Woodstock

This is the last TV special that uses the same cast from Snoopy Come Home, You're Not Elected, Charlie Brown, and There's No Time for Love, Charlie Brown. In the next television special, Kohn, DeFaria, and Momberger would be succeeded in their respective roles by Melanie Kohn (Robin's younger sister), Donna Forman, and Lynn Mortensen, respectively.

== Broadcast history ==
The special first aired on CBS on Tuesday, November 20, 1973, two days before Thanksgiving. It placed third in the Nielsen ratings for the week, behind All in the Family and Sanford & Son.

The special continued to air every year on CBS (skipping 1982, 1983, and 1988) through Nov. 23, 1989.

The Disney Channel and Nickelodeon returned the special for re-airing in the 1990s (in the latter channel's case, under the "You're on Nickelodeon, Charlie Brown" umbrella of productions) and then, in 2001, it moved, along with the rest of the Peanuts specials, to ABC. In contrast to CBS, ABC aired the special every year through 2019, on several days in the week leading up to Thanksgiving, and it regularly won its time slot. As the special runs slightly over a half-hour with commercials, ABC typically filled the remaining portion of the full hour with other Peanuts programming. From 2008 to 2019, the remaining time was filled by a slightly abridged edit of "The Mayflower Voyagers," the premiere episode of the 1988 miniseries This Is America, Charlie Brown.

Starting in 2020, the special (along with the rest of the Peanuts library) has exclusively aired on Apple TV+; under the terms of the agreement, Apple TV+ must provide a three-day window in November in which the special is available for free. On November 18, 2020, Apple announced they had reached an agreement to air the special on Sunday, November 22, 2020, the Sunday before Thanksgiving, commercial free on PBS and PBS Kids. In accordance with most PBS affiliates' non-commercial educational licenses, the special was presented on PBS unedited without commercial interruption, with only a brief underwriting spot before and after the special: "This special broadcast of A Charlie Brown Thanksgiving was made possible by Apple." Apple renewed the agreement with PBS in 2021 but did not renew it for 2022. Apple renewed its exclusive streaming rights to the special in an agreement announced October 2, 2025, the 75th anniversary of the first published Peanuts comic strip.

The special is also broadcast in Canada, usually in early October in line with the Canadian observance of Thanksgiving. The special is aired on Family Channel as of 2018, with the special aired on the day before Thanksgiving and on Thanksgiving Day, which takes place on the second Monday of October in Canada.

== Soundtrack ==
The music for A Charlie Brown Thanksgiving was composed by Vince Guaraldi and conducted/arranged by John Scott Trotter. The score was recorded by the Vince Guaraldi Quintet on August 20, 22, September 4, and October 1 1973, at Wally Heider Studios, featuring Tom Harrell (trumpet), Chuck Bennett (trombone), Seward McCain (electric bass), and Mike Clark (drums).

Prior to the 2023 release of the complete official soundtrack, select cues were scattered across compilation albums beginning in 1998, including:

- Charlie Brown's Holiday Hits (1998)
- The Charlie Brown Suite & Other Favorites (2003)
- Vince Guaraldi and the Lost Cues from the Charlie Brown Television Specials (2007-2008)
- Peanuts Portraits (2010)

On October 20, 2023, the complete original remastered recordings were officially released by Lee Mendelson Film Productions in honor of the special's 50th anniversary, presenting the full score and several previously unreleased tracks for the first time.

== Home media ==
The special was released on RCA's SelectaVision CED format in 1982 as part of the A Charlie Brown Festival Vol. III compilation. It was released on VHS by Kartes Video Communications (later KVC Home Video) in 1987. It was released by Paramount Home Video on VHS on September 28, 1994 and was re-released in clamshell packaging on October 1, 1996. A Charlie Brown Thanksgiving was released on DVD by Paramount Home Entertainment on September 12, 2000. It was re-released by Warner Home Video in remastered form on October 7, 2008. It was released on a Blu-ray/DVD Combo Pack by Warner Home Video on October 5, 2010. The special was released in a 40th anniversary deluxe edition DVD by Warner Home Video with the same features from previous editions on October 1, 2013. The deluxe edition DVD also features "The Mayflower Voyagers". The special was released on Ultra HD Blu-ray on October 24, 2017.

On October 7, 2025, it was released on the DVD and Blu-Ray collection Peanuts: 75th Anniversary Ultimate TV Specials Collection along with 39 other Peanuts specials.
