= There's No Time for Love, Charlie Brown =

1973 animated television special

- Genre: Animated television special
- Based on: Peanuts by Charles M. Schulz
- Directed by: Bill Melendez
- Voices of: Chad Webber; Stephen Shea; Robin Kohn; Hilary Momberger; Jimmy Ahrens; Christopher DeFaria; Todd Barbee; Bill Melendez
- Music by: Vince Guaraldi
- Opening theme: "There's No Time for Love, Charlie Brown"
- Ending theme: "There's No Time for Love, Charlie Brown"
- Country of origin: United States
- Original language: English

Production
- Producers: Lee Mendelson; Bill Melendez
- Running time: 25 minutes
- Production companies: Lee Mendelson Film Productions; Bill Melendez Productions

Original release
- Network: CBS
- Release: March 11, 1973

Related
- You're Not Elected, Charlie Brown (1972); A Charlie Brown Thanksgiving (1973)

There's No Time for Love, Charlie Brown is the ninth prime-time animated TV special based upon the comic strip Peanuts, by Charles M. Schulz. This marks the on-screen debut of Marcie, who first appeared in the comic strip in 1971. The special originally aired on the CBS network on March 11, 1973. The first half of the special is presented as a series of sketches based on various Peanuts strips, while the second half depicts Charlie Brown's erroneous trip to a supermarket, mistaken for an art museum.

== Plot ==
With midterm exams approaching, Charlie Brown and his classmates face mounting academic pressure. Their teacher assigns a field trip to an art museum, intended to provide educational enrichment. However, due to a series of misunderstandings and navigational errors, Charlie Brown, Peppermint Patty, Marcie, and a small group of friends mistakenly enter a supermarket, believing it to be the museum.

Inside, the group misinterprets various store displays as modern art installations and household items as abstract sculptures, leading to humorous commentary and misguided analysis. Meanwhile, Snoopy appears intermittently in his Joe Cool persona, casually observing the events and interacting with passersby in his trademark detached, collegiate manner.

Back at school, the students prepare written reports on their supposed museum visit. Despite the error, the teacher praises their creativity and insight, unaware of the mix-up. Charlie Brown, initially anxious about having failed the assignment, is relieved by the unexpected positive outcome. For the moment, Charlie Brown is optimistic about his academic standing, though still surrounded by the usual uncertainties and comic misadventures that characterize his everyday life.

== Voice cast ==
- Chad Webber as Charlie Brown
- Stephen Shea as Linus van Pelt
- Robin Kohn as Lucy van Pelt
- Hilary Momberger as Sally Brown
- James Ahrens as Marcie
- Todd Barbee as Franklin
- Christopher DeFaria as Peppermint Patty
- Bill Melendez as Snoopy

This would be the final special that Chad Webber (who also voiced the character in Snoopy Come Home and You're Not Elected, Charlie Brown) would voice Charlie Brown in, and would be succeeded by Todd Barbee starting with A Charlie Brown Thanksgiving.

== Music score ==
The music score for There's No Time for Love, Charlie Brown was composed by Vince Guaraldi and conducted and arranged by John Scott Trotter. The score was performed by the Vince Guaraldi Quintet on January 15, February 22 and 26, 1973, at Wally Heider Studios, featuring Tom Harrell (trumpet), Pat O'Hara (flute), Seward McCain (bass) and Glenn Cronkhite (drums).

1. "Early Wake-Up"
2. "There's No Time for Love, Charlie Brown" (version 1, opening credits)
3. "Pitkin County Blues"
4. "There's No Time for Love, Charlie Brown" (version 2)
5. "Play It Again, Charlie Brown" (aka "Charlie's Blues" and "Charlie Brown Blues")
6. "African Sleigh Ride"
7. "Joe Cool" (Lead vocal: Vince Guaraldi)
8. "Peppermint Patty" (brass version)
9. "Apple Jack" (variation of "Linus and Lucy")
10. "Bus Me"
11. "There's No Time for Love, Charlie Brown" (version 3, electric keyboard version)
12. "Linus and Lucy" (electric guitar version)
13. "Incumbent Waltz" (piano + electric guitar version)
14. "There's No Time for Love, Charlie Brown" (version 4, brass)
15. "There's No Time for Love, Charlie Brown" (version 5, wah-wah guitar/end credits)

No official soundtrack for There's No Time for Love, Charlie Brown was released. However, recording session master tapes for seven 1970s-era Peanuts television specials scored by Guaraldi were discovered by his son, David, in the mid-2000s. The songs "Pitkin County Blues", "Play It Again, Charlie Brown" (aka "Charlie's Blues" and "Charlie Brown Blues"), "African Sleigh Ride", "Peppermint Patty", "Joe Cool" and "There's No Time for Love, Charlie Brown" (version 3, electric keyboard version) were released in 2007 on the compilation album, Vince Guaraldi and the Lost Cues from the Charlie Brown Television Specials.

In addition, a live version of "There's No Time for Love, Charlie Brown" was also released in 2008 on Live on the Air from a Vince Guaraldi Trio concert originally recorded on February 6, 1974 (exactly two years to the day before Guaraldi's death). The song was also covered by New Age pianist George Winston on Love Will Come: The Music of Vince Guaraldi, Volume 2 (2010).

== Home media ==
The special was first released on CED in 1981, and on VHS by Kartes Video Communications in 1987, and by Paramount on January 11, 1995. The special occasionally saw airings on the American TV channel Nickelodeon from 1998 to 2000 as part of Nickelodeon's umbrella branding for Peanuts programming, You're on Nickelodeon, Charlie Brown!

It first became available on DVD as a bonus feature (along with another Peanuts special Someday You'll Find Her, Charlie Brown) on January 6, 2004. It was also released in remastered form as part of the DVD box set, Peanuts 1970's Collection, Volume One.

On October 7, 2025, it was released on the DVD and Blu-Ray collection Peanuts: 75th Anniversary Ultimate TV Specials Collection along with 39 other Peanuts specials.
