= You're Not Elected, Charlie Brown =

1972 animated television special

- Based on: Peanuts by Charles M. Schulz
- Written by: Charles M. Schulz
- Directed by: Bill Melendez
- Voices of: Chad Webber; Hilary Momberger; Stephen Shea; Robin Kohn; Todd Barbee; Linda Ercoli; Brian Kazajian; Lynda Mendelson; Bill Melendez
- Music by: Vince Guaraldi
- Opening theme: "You're Not Elected, Charlie Brown" (vocal version)
- Ending theme: "You're Not Elected, Charlie Brown" (Dixieland version)
- Country of origin: United States
- Original language: English

Production
- Producers: Bill Melendez; Lee Mendelson
- Editors: Robert T. Gillis; Charles McCann; Rudy Zamora, Jr.
- Running time: 25 minutes
- Production companies: Lee Mendelson Film Productions; Bill Melendez Productions; United Feature Syndicate

Original release
- Network: CBS
- Release: October 29, 1972

Related
- Play It Again, Charlie Brown (1971); There's No Time for Love, Charlie Brown (1973)

You're Not Elected, Charlie Brown is the eighth prime-time animated TV special produced based upon the comic strip Peanuts by Charles M. Schulz, and the 10th one to air. It originally aired on CBS on October 29, 1972, nine days before the 1972 United States presidential election between incumbent Richard Nixon and Senator George McGovern. It was the first new Peanuts special to air since the spring of 1971.

You're Not Elected, Charlie Brown ranked No. 9 in the Nielsen TV ratings the week it aired. It received a nomination for Outstanding Achievement in Children's Programming, which is Entertainment/Fictional at the 25th Primetime Emmy Awards in 1973.

== Plot ==
As student body elections approach at the local elementary school, Linus proposes that Charlie Brown should run for president, believing that a successful campaign might bolster his social standing and self-confidence. Lucy initially agrees to act as Charlie Brown's campaign manager but quickly conducts an informal poll of classmates and discovers that Charlie Brown lacks the popularity necessary for electoral viability. Confronted with these unfavorable findings, Lucy advises against moving forward with Charlie Brown's candidacy.

Instead, Linus himself becomes a candidate, with Lucy assuming the role of campaign manager. The campaign quickly gathers momentum, aided by persuasive slogans, visually engaging posters, and strategic peer outreach. Although initially disappointed, Charlie Brown supports the effort and assists in organizing campaign activities.

Concurrently, Snoopy appears in his Joe Cool persona, serving as the school hall monitor and engages in exaggerated enforcement of school rules.

As Election Day nears, Linus appears to have secured a broad base of student support. However, during a final campaign assembly, he abruptly diverges from his prepared remarks and begins speaking about the Great Pumpkin, a mythical figure central to his personal belief system. The reference confuses, amuses, and alienates many in the audience, resulting in a precipitous drop in student confidence.

Despite the last-minute controversy, Linus narrowly wins the election (by a deciding vote cast by his opponent, Russell Anderson). His triumph is short-lived, however, as the school principal informs him that the role of student body president is strictly ceremonial, offering no actual authority or policy-making power. Linus is left disheartened by the revelation, and the narrative concludes with a tone of ironic resignation.

== Voice cast ==
- Chad Webber as Charlie Brown
- Stephen Shea as Linus van Pelt
- Robin Kohn as Lucy van Pelt
  - Jean Vander Pyl as Lucy van Pelt (whispering)
- Hilary Momberger as Sally Brown
- Todd Barbee as Russell Anderson
- Linda Ercoli as Violet
- Brian Kazanjian as Schroeder
- Bill Melendez as Snoopy and Woodstock

This special marked the debut television appearance of Woodstock, whose feature film debut was in Snoopy Come Home, also released in 1972.

Patty, Frieda, Pig-Pen, 5, and Shermy also appear.

== Production notes ==
The plot from You're Not Elected, Charlie Brown was taken from a story that ran in the comic strip in October 1964, in which Linus runs for school president with Charlie Brown as his running mate. In the original storyline, Linus blows the election (and Charlie Brown's bid for Vice President) after bringing up The Great Pumpkin in his final speech and being laughed off stage–again after leading in the polls at the time. Unlike the television special, Linus' opponent is never seen or mentioned. This special was originally produced under the title You're Elected, Charlie Brown. It was subsequently changed at the last minute after Charles Schulz, Lee Mendelson, and Bill Melendez realized that Charlie Brown was neither elected nor does he run. This explains why there is a caret between the words "You're" and "Elected" on the chalkboard (there was no time to redo the entire cel) as well as the children’s chorus singing “You’re Elected, Charlie Brown”.

The same storyline, albeit adhering more closely to the original strip, was adapted for the Peanuts Motion Comics episode "Linus for President."

== Music score ==
The music for You're Not Elected, Charlie Brown was composed by Vince Guaraldi and conducted and arranged by John Scott Trotter. The score was performed by the Vince Guaraldi Sextet on August 22, 1972, at Wally Heider Studios, featuring Tom Harrell (trumpet), Pat O'Hara (trombone), Seward McCain (electric bass, flute), Mel Martin (woodwinds) and Glenn Cronkhite (drums). You're Not Elected, Charlie Brown is notable for marking the debut of Snoopy's "Joe Cool" theme song, sung by Guaraldi.

Starting in 2007, select music cues from You're Not Elected, Charlie Brown have been made available on several compilation albums:

- Both the vocal and extended instrumental versions of "Joe Cool" as well as "Incumbent Waltz (Theme from You're Not Elected, Charlie Brown)" (variation No. 4) appeared on Vince Guaraldi and the Lost Cues from the Charlie Brown Television Specials (2007)
- "Oh, Good Grief" and the chimes-driven version of the Peanuts signature tune, "Linus and Lucy" appeared on Vince Guaraldi and the Lost Cues from the Charlie Brown Television Specials, Volume 2 (2008).

On September 6, 2024, a remastered album featuring original recordings and several bonus tracks was released to coincide with the 2024 United States presidential election.

== Home media ==
The special was first released on home video on RCA's SelectaVision CED format in 1982 along with It's the Great Pumpkin, Charlie Brown, It Was a Short Summer, Charlie Brown, and A Charlie Brown Thanksgiving. It was released on VHS and Betamax by Media Home Entertainment in 1985, along with A Charlie Brown Christmas. It was released on VHS again in 1988, this time under their kids subdivision Hi-Tops Video. On August 17, 1994, it accompanied It Was a Short Summer, Charlie Brown on a Snoopy Double Feature release from Paramount Home Entertainment. In 1995, it was released on LaserDisc as a bonus feature with A Charlie Brown Thanksgiving. It has been released on DVD three times, first as a "bonus feature" on the It's the Great Pumpkin, Charlie Brown DVD by Paramount on September 12, 2000 then on its own as part of Warner Home Video's "Remastered Deluxe Edition" line of Peanuts specials on October 7, 2008 and again as part of Peanuts: 1970’s Collection, Volume 1 on October 20, 2009.

On October 7, 2025, it was released on the DVD and Blu-Ray collection Peanuts: 75th Anniversary Ultimate TV Specials Collection along with 39 other Peanuts specials.
