= Snoopy's Magic Show =

1990 video game

- North American cover art
- Developer: Kemco
- Publisher: Kemco
- Series: Peanuts
- Platform: Game Boy
- Release: JP: April 28, 1990; NA: October 1990; EU: 1990
- Genres: Action, puzzle, strategy
- Modes: Single-player, multiplayer

Snoopy's Magic Show, (Note: Japanese: スヌーピーのマジックショー, Snoopy no Magic Show) is a 1990 action puzzle video game, developed and published by Kemco for the Game Boy. The game stars Snoopy, who is tasked with saving four Woodstocks in a set time limit, solving puzzles and dodging enemies to do so.

== Gameplay ==
An example of a puzzle from the game. Snoopy is tasked with moving the arrow blocks to his bidding in order to rescue each Woodstock.

The player controls Snoopy who has to save four Woodstocks, within a fixed amount of time, by dodging bouncing balls, pushing blocks, using warp zones and power-ups. There are 120 levels with a unique password to access each. In the multiplayer mode, one player is Spike while the other is Snoopy.

== Sequel ==
In 1996, Kemco released another Snoopy game for the Game Boy exclusively in Japan, entitled Snoopy no Hajimete no Otsukai. The game made use of features of the Super Game Boy and is the second Japan-exclusive Peanuts game, after Snoopy Concert.

== See also ==
- List of Peanuts media
