= Chad Webber =

American actor (born 1960)

- Born: June 1960 (age 64); United States
- Occupation(s): Production designer, child actor
- Years active: 1972–1973 (child actor); 2017–present (graphic designer)

Chad Webber (born June, 1960) is an American graphic designer and former child actor noted for providing the voice of Charlie Brown in various Peanuts animation films during the early 1970s.

== Filmography ==
=== As production designer ===
- The Indian Detective (2017) - Graphic playback
- Blood Drive (2017–present) - On set graphics
- Maze Runner: The Death Cure (2018) (post-production) - Graphic playback
- Tremors 6 (2018) - Graphic playback

=== As actor ===
- Snoopy Come Home (film musical - 1972) - Charlie Brown (voice)
- You're Not Elected, Charlie Brown (TV special 1972) - Charlie Brown (voice)
- There's No Time for Love, Charlie Brown (TV special 1973) - Charlie Brown (voice)
- Under the Boardwalk: The Monopoly Story (2010) - Charlie Brown (archive footage; voice)
