= Robin Kohn =

American actress

- Born: Robin Sue Kohn; January 4, 1962 (age 63); Los Angeles, California, U.S.
- Occupation: Voice actress
- Years active: 1972–1973
- Family: Melanie Kohn (sister)

Robin Sue Kohn (born January 4, 1962) is an American former child actress noted for providing the voice of Lucy van Pelt in various Peanuts animation films during the early 1970s in Snoopy Come Home; You're Not Elected, Charlie Brown; A Charlie Brown Thanksgiving; and There's No Time for Love, Charlie Brown. Later on, her sister Melanie Kohn would inherit the role from her. She is now a real estate broker in Marin County, California and does some voiceover and acting work under the name Robin Kohn Glazer.

== Filmography ==
Year	Title	Role	Notes
1972	Snoopy Come Home	Lucy van Pelt	Film musical
1972	You're Not Elected, Charlie Brown	Lucy van Pelt	TV special
1973	There's No Time for Love, Charlie Brown	Lucy van Pelt	TV special
1973	A Charlie Brown Thanksgiving	Lucy van Pelt	TV special
