= Snoopy's Street Fair =

2011 city-building video game

- Title screen artwork
- Developer: Beeline Interactive
- Publisher: Capcom
- Composer: Vince Guaraldi (archived compositions)
- Series: Peanuts
- Platforms: iOS, Android
- Release: November 16, 2011: iOS; CAN: November 3, 2011; WW: November 16, 2011; JP: December 9, 2011 Android; JP: July 19, 2012; WW: May 2, 2013
- Genres: City-building; simulation

Snoopy's Street Fair is a discontinued mobile city-building and simulation video game developed by Beeline Interactive and published by Capcom, based on the Peanuts franchise. In the game, the player builds a street fair to save money for Charlie Brown's baseball team. At set intervals, stalls run by Peanuts characters and other attractions will generate in-game currency, which can be used to further expand and decorate the fair. Developed by Beeline from London, the game was part of a line of licensed games by Capcom during a profitable period in the mobile game market.

Snoopy's Street Fair was released to iOS devices on November 16, 2011, following an early release in Canada for gameplay and bug testing. An Android version was released in Japan in 2012 and elsewhere in 2013. The game received mixed reviews from critics; several praised the art style and possible nostalgia factor for Peanuts fans, but found issue with its gameplay loop and integration of microtransactions. Commercially, Snoopy's Street Fair had been downloaded over five million times by July 2012. Beeline developed two follow-up Peanuts games, Snoopy's Candy Town (2013) and Snoopy's Sugar Drop (2014), before the company was merged in 2016. By 2019, Snoopy's Street Fair was discontinued internationally and Capcom had largely moved out of the mobile market.

== Premise and gameplay ==
Gameplay of Snoopy's Street Fair. The golden coins above some stalls indicate that money can be collected.

Snoopy's Street Fair is a video game adaptation of the Peanuts comic strips created by Charles M. Schulz. It uses the same animation style as other Peanuts media, the franchise's voice cast at the time of release, and the original soundtracks by Vince Guaraldi. At the start of the game, Charlie Brown's team is invited to a Little League Baseball tournament in New York City, but they are unable to afford new costumes. At the suggestion of Peppermint Patty, the Peanuts cast start a street fair to raise funds.

Snoopy's Street Fair is a simulation and city-building game in which the player manages the street fair. Peanuts characters operate different stalls and booths, which make income at a set interval; other sources of revenue include unmanned attractions, such as gumball machines. When the allotted time has passed, the player can manually collect the primary in-game currency, Snoopy Coins, and experience points (XP) from the attractions. A more lucrative currency, Snoopy Dollars, can be obtained by leveling up the street fair through collecting XP, which would also unlock more attractions in the shop. Outside stalls, XP is also collected through clearing missions from a to-do list, among other means. Although the game was free-to-play, it operated on a freemium model; the player could use real-world money (ranging from $4.99 to $99.99) via microtransactions to purchase Snoopy Coins and Dollars, which particularly off-sets the slow process to obtain the latter.

At the start of the game, the street fair consists of only a lemonade stand, but Snoopy Coins and Dollars are used to purchase new stalls and decorations for the neighborhood. The player can also upgrade stalls and purchase expansions for more land. Some attractions feature minigames, including juicing lemons, roasting marshmallows, and painting; XP is rewarded for playing. In Snoopy Snaps, a mode unlocked by purchasing a photobooth, the player could take pictures with overlays of Peanuts characters using their device's camera. Additional collectibles include outfits for Snoopy, baseball cards depicting the characters, and previously syndicated Peanuts comic strips, which could be read within the app. The game featured integration with friend lists through Apple Game Center and Facebook; the player could visit others' fairs and send them gifts, or share pictures from Snoopy Snaps and Peanuts-themed digital postcards via Facebook and e-mail.

== Development and release ==
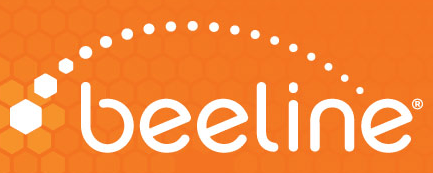
Snoopy's Street Fair was developed by Beeline Interactive, a Capcom subsidiary focused on licensed mobile games.

Snoopy's Street Fair was developed by Beeline Interactive from their studio in London. Beeline was established as a subsidiary of Japanese game developer Capcom around April 2011 to take over their focus on original mobile games, which was becoming an increasingly profitable market. Snoopy's Street Fair continued Capcom's focus on licensed games, following titles based upon franchises such as Where's Waldo?, Mr. Bill, American Gladiators, and The Smurfs. One of their Smurfs titles, Smurfs' Village (2010), was a commercial hit that ranked as a top-grossing app in 55 countries but attracted controversy for its use of microtransactions in a game marketed towards kids. Stuart Dredge for The Guardian wrote, "Capcom will be hoping for less headlines with its latest freemium game, based on the Peanuts cartoons."

On August 3, 2011, it was reported that Capcom had acquired a license for Peanuts and would release a game based upon the franchise that fall. Beeline formally announced its details and title, Snoopy's Street Fair, on September 12, 2011. The game launched for iOS devices in Canada on November 3, 2011, a few weeks ahead of its full release, to allow Beeline time for adjusting gameplay issues and bugs. The general release came on November 18, followed by the game's release in Japan as Snoopy Street (Note: Sunūpī Sutorīto (Japanese: スヌーピーストリート)) on December 9. Android versions were first released in Japan on July 19, 2012, followed by the Western versions on May 2, 2013.

== Critical reception ==
Reception

Aggregate score
| Aggregator | Score |
|---|---|
| Metacritic | 71/100 |

Review scores
| Publication | Score |
|---|---|
| AppSpy | 3/5 |
| Common Sense Media | 3/5 |
| Gamezebo | 4.5/5 |
| Pocket Gamer | 3.5/5 |
| Slide to Play | 3/4 |
| TouchArcade | 2.5/5 |

Snoopy's Street Fair received "mixed or average" reviews from video game critics according to aggregator Metacritic, which calculated a weighted average of 71/100 based upon 7 review scores.

Multiple critics found that the callbacks and similarities to older Peanuts media created a nostalgia factor that could appeal to players familiar with the franchise. (Note: Attributed to Pocket Gamer, AppSpy, Touch Arcade, Slide to Play, and Adweek.) Writing in Gamezebo, Jim Squires noted the game's animation, voice cast, and its usage of Guaraldi's soundtracks. He thought Snoopy's Street Fair finds identity in its "charming details", such as its incidental dialogue from characters like Frieda and Charlie Brown, who deliver "vain questions" and "poetic lines", respectively. Famitsu App's Angel Harada, who ranked Street Fair as one of his favorite mobile games of 2011 despite its late-year release, thought that watching characters walk around the fair was enjoyable in its own right due to their animations in the game's "cute" art style.

Despite favorable comments on the presentation, several reviewers had issues with the game's integration of micropayments. (Note: Attributed to Gamezebo, TouchArcade, and Slide to Play.) Some felt that a slow gameplay loop (like in collecting Snoopy Dollars, as well as the limited use of Snoopy Coins in comparison) strongly encouraged players to spend real-word money. (Note: Attributed to Gamezebo, Slide to Play, and Common Sense Media.) Chris Morris for the parental advice organization Common Sense Media described its freemium strategy as that of a "'velvet rope' app"–the game is marketable to younger audiences because of its use of a recognizable intellectual property and simple gameplay, but encourages paid purchases through the amount of time required to unlock certain items. In her review for Slide to Play, Nadia Oxford sympathized that the developer would need micropayments to turn a profit, but found Snoopy's Street Fair's presentation as a free-to-play game disillusioning when many items of interests, such as the stalls with favorite Peanuts characters, are locked behind Snoopy Dollars.

Some reviewers also critiqued the gameplay. Due to wait times for some stalls spanning up to 24 hours, TouchArcade's Nissa Campbell considered grinding in Snoopy's Street Fair "too brainless" in comparison to other freemium games: "The grinding is oversimplified, as is the decorating. It's all just rather bland." Pocket Gamer's Anthony Usher described it as "a case of tap, wait, tap, wait" that is best played in short intervals. Although Usher found none of the minigames interesting, he called Snoopy Snap one of "several nifty features for fans of Charlie's pet beagle"; Squires (Gamezebo) similarly considered Snoopy Snap one of the game's "neatest little features", while contrastingly finding the minigames enjoyable as well.

== Post-release and sequels ==
On the UK App Store charts for the week ending November 20, 2011, Snoopy's Street Fair was the eighth most-downloaded free app on iPads. It was the second-highest video game on the list that week, behind only Blood & Glory. At the start of 2012, PocketGamer.biz ranked Capcom Mobile (including its profits from Beeline) as the year's thirteenth most-successful mobile developer due to Smurfs' Village, while writing that other titles including Snoopy's Street Fair failed to "catch the public's imagination". Regardless, the game had received five million downloads by July 2012 and was called another "iOS hit" for the company by VG247. Capcom's financial reports described Snoopy's Street Fair as a steady income source with favorable performance in Japan and Asia.

A sequel to Snoopy's Street Fair, Snoopy's Candy Town, was developed by Beeline and released to mobile on December 18, 2013. In Candy Town, the player helps manage a candy factory to raise funds for Charlie Brown's campaign for class president. To fulfill candy orders from customers, the player commands Woodstocks to order groceries and produce sweets. Strategy elements are introduced as the player can upgrade machinery, plan delivery routes, and manage their ingredient storage. A third Beeline Peanuts title, a match-three game titled Snoopy's Sugar Drop, was released on May 15, 2014. The player helps Snoopy search for his missing sister, Belle, by clearing match-three puzzles in a similar vein to Candy Crush.

In 2016, Beeline was merged with other Capcom studios to form Capcom Mobile, following a decline in profits within the mobile game market. Snoopy's Street Fair was eventually discontinued in the West; it stayed in service longer in Japan, but ultimately closed there too on September 26, 2019. As Capcom moved priorities away from casual mobile games, their other Peanuts titles were also discontinued, but some remained active in Japan. In March 2020, Capcom released Snoopy Puzzle Journey — a tile-matching game — but gave it little marketing. Based on Puzzle Journey's mistranslated website and absence from Capcom's recent financial report, PocketGamer.biz's Ric Cowley presumed its launch was a test on the viability of the Western mobile market.

== See also ==
- List of Capcom subsidiaries
- The Simpsons: Tapped Out (2012), freemium city-building game based on The Simpsons
- Family Guy: The Quest for Stuff (2014), freemium city-building game based on Family Guy
- Futurama: Worlds of Tomorrow (2017), freemium city-building game based on Futuruma
