= Pamelyn Ferdin =

American actress (b. 1959)

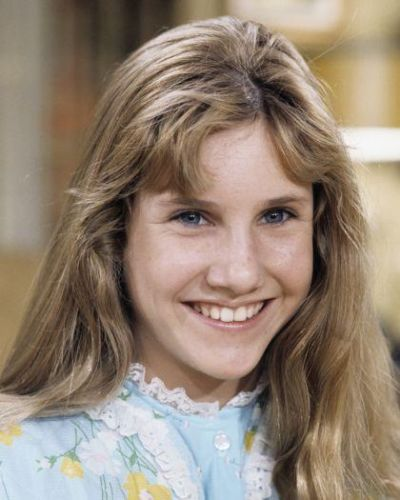
- Ferdin as Edna Unger on The Odd Couple in 1972
- Born: February 4, 1959 (age 67); Los Angeles, California, U.S.
- Occupations: Actress, nurse, public relations director, animal-rights activist
- Years active: 1964–2009
- Spouse: Jerry Vlasak (m. 1986; div. 2008)

Pamelyn Ferdin (born February 4, 1959) is an American animal rights activist and former actress. Ferdin's acting career was primarily during the 1960s and 1970s, though she appeared in projects sporadically in the 1980s and later years. She began her acting career in television commercials, made 250 television shows and films and gained renown for her work as a voice actress supplying the voice of Lucy Van Pelt in A Boy Named Charlie Brown (1969), as well as in two other Peanuts television specials.

She had supporting roles in The Beguiled (1971) with Clint Eastwood and Geraldine Page, and a lead role in the exploitation film The Toolbox Murders (1978) with Cameron Mitchell. She also supplied the voice of Fern Arable in Charlotte's Web (1973). Ferdin distanced herself from acting in the late 1970s, worked as a registered nurse and shifted into animal rights activism, working as an activist and protester in animal-protection programs in New York City and Los Angeles.

== Early life ==
Born in Los Angeles on February 4, 1959, to Kenneth and Wanda (Jacewitz) Ferdin, she began her career at age three, appearing in a hair color commercial. She has two older sisters, Valerie and Wendy, who acted when they were young. Ferdin attended Herbert Hoover High School in Glendale, California.

In a 2016 interview with The Washington Times, she said she would have liked to have experienced "what it was like to be a normal kid in high school — without always going in and then being taken out, going back and forth."

She has said that she regretted not having many aspects of a normal childhood and that her mother pushed her into acting. In 2016, she said, "My mom put me in the business. I had a very Hollywood mother. She put me in, and I just started getting role after role after role."

== Career ==
=== Acting and appearances ===
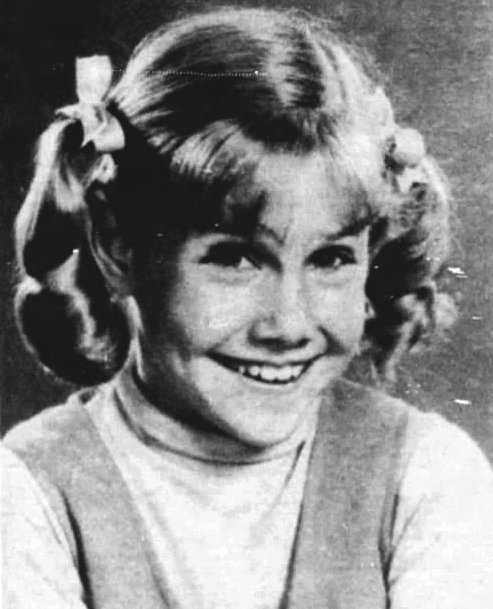
Ferdin in a promotional shot for Blondie (1968)

Ferdin played the Bumsteads' daughter Cookie in the 1968–1969 CBS revival series Blondie. She was subsequently cast as Felix Unger's daughter Edna in the 1970s ABC series version of The Odd Couple and Paul Lynde's daughter Sally on the short-lived The Paul Lynde Show.

She appeared on Star Trek in 1968 as one of a group of orphaned children led by an alien with sinister motives in the episode "And the Children Shall Lead" and in the 1977 series Space Academy as Laura Gentry.

Ferdin's distinctive voice secured her voiceover roles, and she was cast to provide the voice of Lucy Van Pelt in three Peanuts cartoons: the 1969 TV special It Was a Short Summer, Charlie Brown, a 1969 feature film A Boy Named Charlie Brown and the 1971 TV special Play It Again, Charlie Brown. She provided the voice of Sally, the little girl in the 1971 animated TV special of Dr. Seuss's The Cat in the Hat. Ferdin was a frequent guest star on episodic television in the 1960s and 1970s, with appearances on Bewitched; Green Acres; The Andy Griffith Show; Branded; Daniel Boone; Custer; The Monkees; The Flying Nun; The Second Hundred Years; Gunsmoke; Shazam!; The High Chaparral; Mannix; The Brady Bunch; Family Affair; Love, American Style; Marcus Welby, M.D.; Sigmund and the Sea Monsters; Apple's Way; The Streets of San Francisco; Baretta; CHiPS; and 240-Robert.

She had a brief and uncredited role in The Reluctant Astronaut (1967) and was featured in the Walt Disney musical The One and Only, Genuine, Original Family Band (1968). Her association with Walt Disney earned an appearance with him in a color TV magazine advertisement, looking over Disney's right shoulder. She appeared as Mary Constable in the supernatural TV movie Daughter of the Mind and as Abby Clarkson in the horror film The Mephisto Waltz (1971) with Alan Alda. The same year, Ferdin appeared in The Christine Jorgensen Story, based on the life of the first person in the United States to undergo sex reassignment surgery, and in The Beguiled alongside Clint Eastwood and Geraldine Page. She then appeared in the Kurt Vonnegut adaptation Happy Birthday Wanda June, and in the exploitation horror film The Toolbox Murders (1978).

She voiced Fern Arable, the little girl who raises Wilbur the pig, in the 1973 animated film Charlotte's Web.

Ferdin was considered for the role of Regan MacNeil, the demon-possessed girl in the 1973 William Friedkin film The Exorcist, but casting directors decided she was too well-known and cast the less familiar actress Linda Blair.

Her last acting roles were as the voice of the character Shelley Kelley in the Kids' WB series Detention in 1999 and as Christmas the Horse in the feature film Elf Sparkle Meets Christmas the Horse in 2008.

In 2020, Ferdin co-hosted two episodes of the television talk show "Ken Boxer Live" on TVSB TV, originating in Santa Barbara, California.

=== Activism ===
After leaving her job as a public relations director in the mid-1990s, Ferdin began working for the Center for Animal Care and Control in New York City. In August 2004, Ferdin accepted the presidency of Stop Huntingdon Animal Cruelty (SHAC), according to statements filed under oath in U.S. District Court in New Jersey. The incumbent, Kevin Kjonaas, resigned after being indicted on charges of conspiracy and interstate stalking. When Kjonaas and six other SHAC activists were jailed in 2006, Ferdin vowed to continue the campaign. According to salon.com, she defined her role as "a squeaky-clean representative for SHAC USA," but warned that if the SHAC seven were convicted, "[P]eople, I think, are going to get hurt. There's going to be a lot of violence."

In 2004, she accused the parents of Kelly Keen, a three-year-old child killed in a coyote attack, of murdering their daughter and using the story of an animal attack to cover up the crime. This was part of her protest against public efforts to control the coyote population near suburban homes.

On June 22, 2006, Ferdin was sentenced to 90 days in jail for trespassing and "targeted demonstration" outside the home of an employee of the Los Angeles Department of Animal Services. She stated that the conviction "is not going to affect my speaking out and exposing the atrocities occurring at our six city shelters". She served 36 hours and was released before serving the full sentence due to prison overcrowding.

In December 2006, Ferdin's group, the Animal Defense League, Los Angeles (ADLLA), announced that it had been awarded $75,000 against the city of Los Angeles for an anti-strategic lawsuit against public participation motion.

Her ex-husband, Jerry Vlasak, "sits on a precarious perch within the animal rights movement," according to a profile in The Los Angeles Times in 2006. "Through his Animal Liberation Press Office, he is the spokesman for shadowy groups that sabotage labs, vandalize homes, firebomb properties and make death threats via late-night phone calls. But he works in the wide open, operating a website, issuing press releases, talking to journalists."

In 2008, Ferdin was found in contempt of court, after allegedly violating an injunction. The conviction was overturned and she filed a federal lawsuit against UCLA for harassment.

== Personal life ==
She was a member of Kappa Alpha Theta sorority at the University of Southern California in 1978.

She graduated from the Los Angeles County Medical Center School of Nursing in the spring of 1981 and got her first nursing job on the medical ward at UCLA Medical Center.

She married Vlasak, a surgeon, on October 12, 1986, but divorced him in 2008.

She has been a vegan since the mid-1990s. She promotes adopting rather than buying pets as well as having pets spayed or neutered.

== Filmography ==
=== Film ===
Year	Title	Role	Notes
1964	What a Way to Go!	Geraldine Crawley	
1967	The Reluctant Astronaut	Mary	
1968	The One and Only, Genuine, Original Family Band	Laura Bower	
1969	A Boy Named Charlie Brown	Lucy Van Pelt	Voice
1970	The Christine Jorgensen Story	Dolly	
1971	The Beguiled	Amy	
1971	The Mephisto Waltz	Abby Clarkson	
1971	What's the Matter with Helen?	Kiddie M.C.	
1971	Happy Birthday, Wanda June	Wanda June	
1973	Charlotte's Web	Fern Arable	Voice
1978	The Toolbox Murders	Laurie Ballard	
1982	Heidi's Song	Klara	Voice

=== Television ===
Year	Title	Role	Notes
1964	The Littlest Hobo	Cindy Clark	"The Babysitter"
1965	The Andy Griffith Show	Corlis	"The Bazaar"
1965	Branded	Abigail	"A Proud Town"
1965–66	The John Forsythe Show	Pamela	"The Little Old Matchmaker", "Super Girl", "Anyone for a Fat Lip?"
1966	The Legend of Jesse James	Rosey Bryant	"A Burying for Rosey"
1966	And Baby Makes Three	Linda Jayne	TV film
1966-71	Family Affair	various roles	4 episodes
1966	My Three Sons	Roseann	"Fly Away Home"
1967	Valley of Mystery	Penny	TV film
1967	Custer	Irene Maloney	"To the Death"
1967	The Second Hundred Years	Nancy	"Luke's First Christmas"
1967	The Monkees	Girl	"Monkees at the Movies"
1968	Green Acres	Molly Mullen	"Instant Family"
1968	Mad Mad Scientist	Sally Springer	TV film
1968	Star Trek	Mary	"And the Children Shall Lead"
1968	Gunsmoke	Annie Jarvis	"The Money Store"
1968	The Flying Nun	Linda Shapiro, Violetta	"The Reconversion of Sister Shapiro", "Cousins by the Dozen"
1968–69	Blondie	Cookie Bumstead	Main role
1969	Charlie Brown and Charles Schulz	Lucy Van Pelt (voice)	TV documentary
1969	The High Chaparral	Jennie Simmons / Charity	"No Bugles, No Drums", "For the Love of Carlos"
1969	It Was a Short Summer, Charlie Brown	Lucy Van Pelt (voice)	TV short
1969	Daughter of the Mind	Mary Constable	ABC Movie of the Week
1970	Smoke	Susie	TV film
1970	Mannix	Dana	"Fly, Little One" (Season 3, Episode 21)
1971	The Brady Bunch	Lucy Winters	"Will the Real Jan Brady Please Stand Up?"
1971	The Cat in the Hat	Sally (voice)	TV short
1971	Play It Again, Charlie Brown	Lucy Van Pelt (voice)	TV short
1971	Curiosity Shop	Pam	"Special," main role in TV series
1971–72	The Odd Couple	Cindy, Edna Unger	3 episodes
1971	The Forgotten Man	Sharon Hardy	ABC Movie of the Week
1971	Night Gallery	Frances Anne Emsden	"Brenda"
1971	Marcus Welby, M.D.	Felicia	"A Portrait of Debbie"
1972	Young Dr. Kildare	Julie Loomis	"The Night of the Intern"
1972	The Delphi Bureau	Alice	"Pilot"
1972	The Roman Holidays	Precocia (voice)	TV series (13 episodes)
1972	Sealab 2020	Sally Murphy (voice)	TV series
1972	The ABC Saturday Superstar Movie	Louisa / Lilibit (voice)	"Oliver and the Artful Dodger: Parts 1 & 2"
1972	Lassie: Joyous Sound	Lucy Baker	TV film
1972–73	The Paul Lynde Show	Sally Simms	Main role
1972–73	Lassie	Lucy Baker	Main role (seasons 18–19)
1973	Marcus Welby, M.D.	Amy	"The Tall Tree"
1973	Sigmund and the Sea Monsters	Peggy	"Puppy Love"
1974	A Tree Grows in Brooklyn	Francie Nolan	TV film
1974	These Are the Days	Kathy Day (voice)	Main role
1974	Shazam!	Lynn Colby	"Thou Shalt Not Kill"
1974	Apple's Way	Sally	"The Flag"
1975	Miles to Go Before I Sleep	Lisa	TV film
1976	The Streets of San Francisco	Chris Cavanaugh	"Runaway"
1977	Baretta	Judy	"The Runaways"
1977	Space Academy	Laura Gentry	Main role
1978	CHiPs	Susie	"Rustling"
1978	Vegas	Katie Howard	"Serve, Volley and Kill"
1978	Project U.F.O.	Cindy Harper	"Sighting 4023: The I-Man Incident"
1979	240-Robert	Nikki	"The Apology"
1985	It's Your 20th Television Anniversary, Charlie Brown	Herself	TV documentary
1999	Detention	Shelley Kelley (voice)	Main role
2004	Penn & Teller: Bullshit!	Herself	"P.E.T.A." (season 2, episode 1)
2009	Elf Sparkle Meets Christmas the Horse	Christmas the Horse (voice)	TV film

== Sources ==
- Leszczak, Bob (2014). The Odd Couple on Stage and Screen: A History with Cast and Crew Profiles and an Episode Guide. Jefferson, North Carolina: McFarland. ISBN 978-1-476-61539-4.
