= Lynda Mendelson =

American actress (b. 1961)

- Born: January 6, 1961 (age 64); San Mateo, California
- Other names: Linda Mendelson
- Occupation: Actress
- Years active: 1969−2015
- Father: Lee Mendelson

Lynda Mendelson (also known as Linda Mendelson; born January 6, 1961) is an American former child actress noted for providing the voice of Frieda in several Peanuts animated specials during the late 1960s and the early 1970s.

Later in life she has worked behind the scenes in various capacities within the film production industry. Mendelson is the daughter of Peanuts producer Lee Mendelson.

== Vocal roles ==
- A Boy Named Charlie Brown (film musical - 1969)
- Play It Again, Charlie Brown (TV special - 1971)
- Snoopy Come Home (film musical - 1972)
