= Hilary Momberger =

American actress (b. 1962)

- Born: Hilary Denise Momberger; June 16, 1962 (age 63)
- Occupation(s): Actress, voice actress, script supervisor
- Years active: 1969–present
- Spouse: Stephan Abrams (m. 1996; div. 1998)
- Website: www.hilarypowers.com

Hilary Momberger-Powers (born Hilary Denise Momberger; June 16, 1962) is an American actress, former child voice actress, and script supervisor, who is best known for voicing Sally Brown in the Peanuts franchise in the late-1960s and early-1970s.

== Career ==
Momberger was the voice of Sally Brown in five Peanuts specials It Was a Short Summer, Charlie Brown (1969), Play It Again, Charlie Brown (1971), You're Not Elected, Charlie Brown (1972), There's No Time for Love, Charlie Brown (1973), and A Charlie Brown Thanksgiving (1973). She also voiced Sally in the second Peanuts movie Snoopy Come Home (1972). In recent years, Momberger has become a successful script supervisor working on varied film titles including: Being John Malkovich and Rat Race. She also appeared in episodes of Dawson's Creek, Grey's Anatomy and Ally McBeal.

== Filmography ==
=== Film ===
Year	Title	Role	Notes
1972	Snoopy Come Home	Sally	
1996	The Little Death	Policewoman	
2006	Surf School	Mother in Customs	
2015	Fake	Holland	
2020	Hard Plastic	Sonya	
2020	Canaan Land	Professor Cathy Brown	

=== Television ===
Year	Title	Role	Notes
1969	It Was a Short Summer, Charlie Brown	Sally Brown	Television short
1971	Play It Again, Charlie Brown	Sally Brown	Television short
1972	You're Not Elected, Charlie Brown	Sally Brown	Television short
1973	There's No Time for Love, Charlie Brown	Sally Brown	Television short
1973	A Charlie Brown Thanksgiving	Sally Brown	Television short
1975	The First Christmas: The Story of the First Christmas Snow	Voice	Television film
1985	It's Your 20th Television Anniversary, Charlie Brown	Sally Brown	Television film
2016	Batman Beyond: The Series	Barbara Gordon	Episode: "The Missing Linque"
2018	House of Darkness: New Blood	Elaine	Television film
2019	Open Relationship	Patricia	Episode: "Desperate Times"
