= Snoopy Concert =

1995 video game

- Cover art. From left to right: Schroeder (left, looking at Woodstock), Woodstock (middle, jumping), Snoopy (right, dancing)
- Developers: Pax Softonica; Nintendo R&D1
- Publishers: Mitsui Fudosan; Dentsu
- Director: Kazunobu Shimizu
- Producer: Hiroo Takami
- Artists: Eiko Takahashi; Kazunobu Shimizu; Takashi Koyama
- Composers: Hirokazu Tanaka; Minako Hamano
- Platform: Super Famicom
- Release: JP: May 19, 1995
- Genre: Puzzle
- Mode: Single-player

Snoopy Concert (スヌーピーコンサート) is a Japan-exclusive puzzle game based on the Peanuts comic strip which was released for the Super Famicom in 1995. The game never received an official release in English-speaking territories, though unofficial fan translations have been released online.

== Gameplay ==
Gameplay with Snoopy.

The game primarily combines point-and-click mechanics with side-scrolling platform gameplay. The player controls Woodstock and directs Snoopy as he performs various errands for different Peanuts characters. The ultimate goal in the game is to get everyone to the concert hall to attend Snoopy's concert.

There are four different gameplay types, one for each character Snoopy must assist; these gameplay segments can be played in any order. Rerun's segment is an auto-scrolling game that requires Snoopy to intercept and remove obstacles in Rerun's path. Linus's segment features several races, in which Snoopy must reach the end of a stage before an opponent. Schroeder's segment is a puzzle-platformer, with Snoopy needing to find specific tools necessary to get past certain obstacles. Charlie Brown's segment is a traditional point-and-click adventure game, in which Snoopy acts as a detective and must locate several missing items by finding clues and talking to suspects. Other characters such as Peppermint Patty also make non-playable appearances in each of the games.

In addition to the standard Super Famicom controller, the game can also be controlled using the Super Famicom Mouse.

The music was composed by Hirokazu Tanaka and Minako Hamano, and includes arrangements of tracks written originally written by Vince Guaraldi. The game supports either stereo or monoaural sound.

== Reception ==
On release, Famicom Tsūshin scored the game a 28 out of 40.

== See also ==
- List of Peanuts media
