= Snoopy Come Home =

1972 film by Bill Melendez

- Theatrical release poster
- Directed by: Bill Melendez
- Written by: Charles M. Schulz
- Based on: Peanuts by Charles M. Schulz
- Produced by: Lee Mendelson; Bill Melendez
- Starring: Chad Webber; Robin Kohn; Stephen Shea; David Carey; Johanna Baer; Hilary Momberger; Chris De Faria; Linda Ercoli; Linda Mendelson; Bill Melendez
- Edited by: Robert T. Gillis; Charles McCann; Rudy Zamora
- Music by: Richard M. Sherman; Robert B. Sherman
- Production companies: Cinema Center Films; Lee Mendelson/Bill Melendez Productions; Sopwith Productions
- Distributed by: National General Pictures
- Release date: August 9, 1972
- Running time: 80 minutes
- Country: United States
- Language: English
- Budget: $1 million
- Box office: $245,037

Snoopy Come Home is a 1972 American animated musical comedy-drama film directed by Bill Melendez and written by Charles M. Schulz, based on the Peanuts comic strip. Marking the on-screen debut of Woodstock, who had first appeared in the strip in 1967, the main plot was based on a storyline from August 1968 (which was the only Cinema Center Films production to feature the Peanuts character Woodstock). It was the first Peanuts production to be associated with Charles M. Schulz Creative Development Corp. (later known as Charles M. Schulz Creative Associates) and the only Peanuts film during composer Vince Guaraldi’s lifetime without a score composed by him, its music was composed by the Sherman Brothers, who composed the music for various Disney films like Mary Poppins (1964), The Jungle Book (1967), and Bedknobs and Broomsticks (1971).

Snoopy Come Home was released on August 9, 1972, by National General Corporation, produced by Lee Mendelson Films, Bill Melendez Productions and Cinema Center Films (in the latter's final production). Despite only grossing less than a quarter of its $1 million production budget commercially, it received generally positive reviews from critics and fared much more successfully on home video.

== Plot ==
Snoopy receives a letter and, upon reading it, departs with Woodstock without explanation to Charlie Brown or his friends. Charlie Brown discovers the letter is from a girl named Lila, who has been hospitalized for three weeks and has requested Snoopy’s company. Charlie Brown and his friends are puzzled, unaware of Lila’s identity or connection to Snoopy. They begin to miss Snoopy.

Snoopy and Woodstock encounter multiple obstacles, including repeated “No Dogs Allowed” signs on their journey to Lila. Clara, a young girl who's permitted to keep Snoopy, briefly captures and keeps them as pets. Snoopy and Woodstock escape and go camping, play football, and make music while preparing their meals.

When they arrive at the hospital, they find that neither dogs nor birds are permitted. After an initial failed attempt, Snoopy evades security and sneaks into Lila's room. He provides her companionship and comfort, and she credits his visit with helping her recover.

Linus inquires at the Daisy Hill Puppy Farm about Snoopy's origins and learns that Lila was Snoopy's original owner before Charlie Brown. Lila's family had returned Snoopy to the puppy farm while preparing to relocate. Charlie Brown faints upon hearing this.

Lila asks Snoopy to return home with her, but he initially decides to return to Charlie Brown. As he departs, he sees Lila watching tearfully from her hospital window. He rushes back and embraces her, which she interprets as wishing to live with her. Snoopy determines that he must first return to bid farewell to his friends.

Snoopy writes a letter to Charlie Brown to inform him of his impending departure and distributes some of his possessions to his friends. The children organize a farewell party for Snoopy, each presenting him with a parting gift—most of which are bones. Some of the party's attendants attempt somewhat to maintain a civil and upbeat demeanor, but even Lucy is unable to hold herself together for long. Several friends deliver speeches in Snoopy's honor. Though Charlie Brown is invited to make one as well, he is too emotional to speak or even make eye contact with Snoopy as he hands him his gift, and is only capable of emitting a pained, sorrowful wail. After Snoopy departs, Charlie Brown is too upset to eat or sleep.

At Lila's apartment complex, Snoopy sees a "No Dogs Allowed" sign and is pleased to have a justification for returning to Charlie Brown. Lila introduces Snoopy to her cat, whom Snoopy regards with reluctance. He points out the “No Dogs” sign to Lila, who concedes that Snoopy cannot stay with her.

Snoopy returns home, where the children erupt in joy and carry him back to his doghouse in celebration, where Snoopy types out formal requests for the return of the gifts he had distributed. The group leaves in irritation.

== Voice cast ==
- Chad Webber as Charlie Brown
- Robin Kohn as Lucy van Pelt
- Stephen Shea as Linus van Pelt
- David Carey as Schroeder
- Johanna Baer as Lila
- Hilary Momberger as Sally Brown
- Chris De Faria as Peppermint Patty
- Linda Ercoli as Clara
- Linda Mendelson as Frieda
- Bill Melendez as Snoopy and Woodstock

== Production ==
=== Snoopy’s thoughts ===
Snoopy Come Home marked the first time Snoopy's thoughts are fully communicated to the audience outside of the comic strip. This was achieved by having his typed correspondences appear at the top of the frame, giving the viewer full access to his thoughts. Previously, Schulz had opted to mute Snoopy entirely, except for inflected squealing and growling. Snoopy's thought balloons, though overt in the strip, are not translated in the animated projects.

=== Music ===
Snoopy Come Home was the only Peanuts animated project produced during Vince Guaraldi's lifetime (1928–76) that did not contain a musical score by the noted jazz composer. Guaraldi had composed all the previous Peanuts animated television specials as well as the debut film A Boy Named Charlie Brown. Music for this film was instead provided by the Sherman Brothers, who had composed some of the music used in various Disney films and theme park attractions. Schulz said this was an experiment, as he had wanted to have more of a commercial "Disney" feel to Snoopy Come Home. "Everybody felt that the first movie had too much the 'feel' of the TV specials," said producer Lee Mendelson in 2011. "We collectively thought that we needed more of a feature film 'look' and score. That's why we went to the Shermans, who at the time were No. 1 in their field for such things."

Schulz later said he had planned on utilizing Guaraldi's services for the third Peanuts feature, Race for Your Life, Charlie Brown, had the composer not died suddenly in February 1976.

A soundtrack LP was released by Columbia Masterworks, but it is now out of print.

Side one
No.	Title	Lead vocal	Length
1.	"Snoopy, Come Home"		1:45
2.	"Lila's Theme (Do You Remember Me)"	Shelby Flint	3:12
3.	"At The Beach"		2:18
4.	"No Dogs Allowed!"	Thurl Ravenscroft	3:01
5.	"The Best Of Buddies"	Don Ralke; Ray Pohlman	1:27
6.	"Fundamental - Friend - Dependability"	Linda Ercoli	2:21
7.	"Woodstock's Samba"		1:15

Side two
No.	Title	Lead vocal	Length
8.	"Charlie Brown's Caliope"		2:49
9.	"Snoopy, Come Home (Sad Reprise)"		1:58
10.	"Gettin' It Together"	Don Ralke; Ray Pohlman	1:52
11.	"It Changes"	Guy Pohlman	4:15
12.	"The Best Of Buddies (Reprise)"	Don Ralke; Ray Pohlman	1:22
13.	"Lila's Theme (Instrumental Reprise)"		1:56
14.	"Snoopy, Come Home (End Title Reprise)"		1:36
Total length:			31:05

== Release ==
The film was released on August 9, 1972, by National General Pictures, produced by Lee Mendelson Film Productions, Bill Melendez Productions (uncredited in copyright), Sopwith Productions and Cinema Center Films (in the latter's final production). It was first televised on November 5, 1976, as a CBS Special Film Presentation becoming a CBS feature special.

=== Reception ===
As of September 2020, the film had a 93% rating on review aggregate website Rotten Tomatoes, based on 14 reviews with an average score of 7.70/10. Howard Thompson of The New York Times said: "This sprightly, clever and hilarious treat—all that a comic strip could be on the screen—is even better than A Boy Named Charlie Brown, which began the series."

=== Accolades ===
The film won the first CEC Award for Best Children's Film.

=== Home media ===
The film was released on VHS, CED, and LaserDisc in 1984 by CBS Fox Video, 1985 and 1987 by Playhouse Video, February 20, 1992 on Fox Video and CBS Fox Video, February 6, 1996, by 20th Century Fox Home Entertainment, and May 29, 2001, on VHS by Paramount Home Entertainment, and 2004 on Videonow Color PVD by Paramount Home Entertainment, Hasbro, and Tiger Electronics, and re-released on DVD in anamorphic widescreen in the U.S. on March 28, 2006, by Paramount Home Entertainment/CBS Home Entertainment (CBS owned Cinema Center Films, which co-produced the film). The film was released on Blu-ray on November 1, 2016, along with A Boy Named Charlie Brown.

== See also ==
- Peanuts filmography
