= Christopher DeFaria =

American film producer (b. 1959)

Chris DeFaria
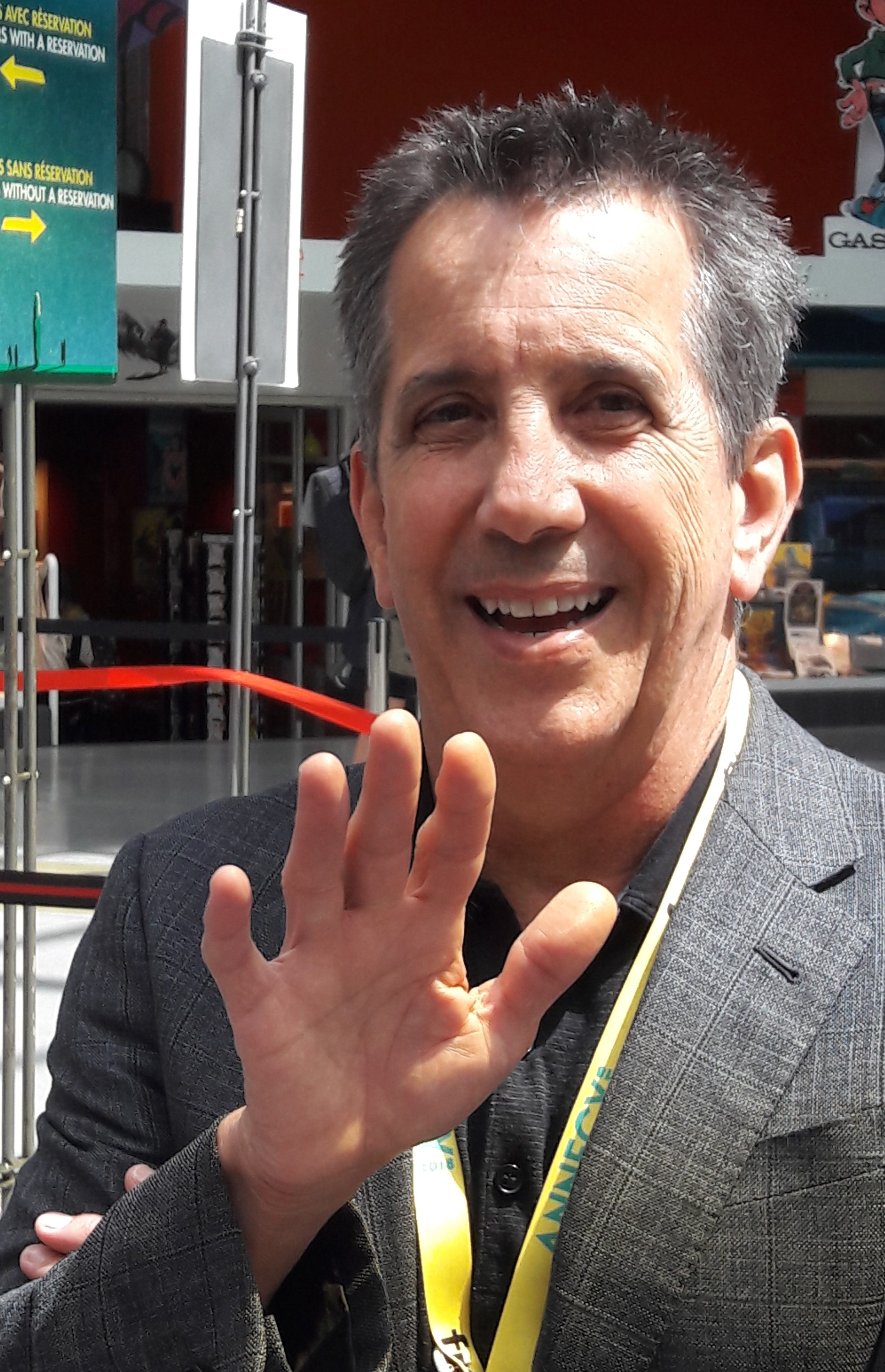
- DeFaria in 2018
- Born: Christopher Joseph DeFaria; May 20, 1959 (age 67); San Francisco, California, U.S.
- Education: University of California, Los Angeles
- Occupations: Film producer, screenwriter
- Years active: 1969–1973 (voice actor); 1989–present (producer)
- Spouse: Alexandra Yates Knox (m. 1992)
- Children: 3

Christopher Joseph DeFaria (born May 20, 1959) is an American film producer, screenwriter and former voice actor. He served as president of animation and innovative technology at Warner Bros. Pictures for four years. In January 2017, he joined DreamWorks Animation in the newly created position of president of the DreamWorks Feature Animation Group. As president, DeFaria oversaw all aspects of DWA's feature animation business, including slate strategy, development, production; innovation and technology; and business affairs prior to his departure in early 2019.

He is a graduate of UCLA, a member of the AMPAS and WGA and a founding member of FilmAid International. He serves on the board of the American Academy of Dramatic Arts.

== Early life ==
Christopher deFaria was born to film producer Walt DeFaria, whose credits include several Sanrio films such as the 1977 animated film The Mouse and His Child and the 1982 war drama Don't Cry, It's Only Thunder.

== Career ==
=== 1969–1973: Early career ===
DeFaria began his Hollywood career in 1969 as a voice actor playing the part of Peppermint Patty in Peanuts TV specials from the same year until 1973. He also has a sister, Gabrielle "Gai" DeFaria Ritter, who was previously Peppermint Patty's voice before he took over.

=== 1989–present: Later career ===
In 1989, DeFaria returned to the television industry as production manager, screenwriter and producer, beginning with his role as post-production supervisor for the television horror film Amityville 4: The Evil Escapes broadcast on NBC. He later co-wrote with Antonio M. Toro two Amityville Horror installments which were released direct-to-video: Amityville 1992: It's About Time and Amityville: A New Generation (1993), both of which he also served as producer.

By 1996, DeFaria joined Warner Bros. Pictures as vice president of physical production. His first full producer credit for a theatrical film was for the 2001 spy comedy Cats & Dogs, with DeFaria being involved in the attempt to convincingly blend CGI animal characters with live-action backgrounds and people alongside special effects artist Stan Winston. He later became president of Warner Bros.' animation and innovative technology division for four years beginning in 2013.

In January 2017, DeFaria was chosen to become the new president of DreamWorks Animation (by then under NBCUniversal), succeeding Jeffrey Katzenberg who stepped down as its CEO. As president, DeFaria ran the studio's feature animation business as a whole, "including slate strategy, development, production, innovation and technology, and business affairs", with him directly answering to Universal Pictures chairperson Donna Langley. After two years, DeFaria vacated his position as president in January 2019, being succeeded by DreamWorks Animation TV head Margie Cohn.

DeFaria produced the 2021 live-action animated film Tom and Jerry, and he also produced the film Coyote vs. Acme alongside James Gunn.

Prior to establishing Keylight, Chris served as President of DreamWorks Animation where he led the studio’s creative development and technological advancement. Before that he was president of Digital Production and Innovative Technology at Warner Bros. Pictures where he founded Warner Animation Group, the studio's animation division, developed VFX strategies for films like Harry Potter and The Matrix and oversaw initiatives in AI and VR.

== Filmography ==
Producer
Year	Title	Notes
1991	...And Then She Was Gone	TV movie
1992	Amityville 1992: It's About Time	Direct-to-video; Also writer
1993	Amityville: A New Generation	Direct-to-video; Also writer
1995	Live Nude Girls	Co-producer
1996	Tremors 2: Aftershocks	Direct-to-video
2001	Cats & Dogs	
2021	Tom & Jerry	
2026	Coyote vs. Acme	

Associate producer
Year	Title	Notes
1989	Double Your Pleasure	TV movie
1990	She Said No	TV movie
1990	A Mom for Christmas	TV movie
1991	What Ever Happened to...	TV movie
1991	Locked Up: A Mother's Rage	TV movie
1992	Day-O	TV movie
1992	A Murderous Affair: The Carolyn Warmus Story	TV movie
1993	Miracle Child	TV movie
2020	The Young Witchfinder	TV movie

Executive producer

- Looney Tunes: Back in Action (2003)
- Legend of the Guardians: The Owls of Ga'Hoole (2010)
- Sucker Punch (2011)
- Happy Feet Two (2011)
- Gravity (2013)
- Mad Max: Fury Road (2015)
- Ready Player One (2018)
- The Lego Movie 2: The Second Part (2019) (Production executive)

Special thanks

- One Small Hero (1999)
- Trolls World Tour (2020)
- The Croods: A New Age (2020)
