= Beecher family =

19th century political family

Beecher
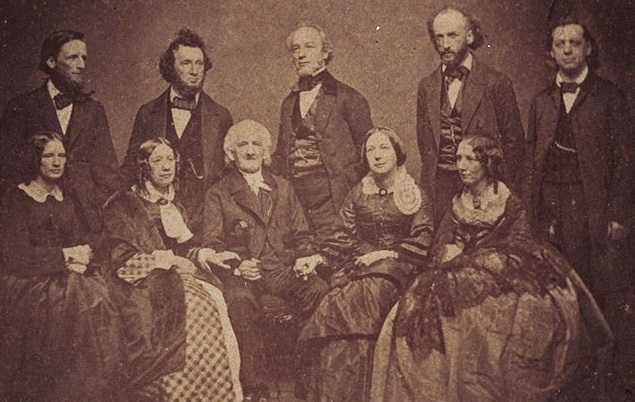
- Beecher family, c. 1858–1862
- Current region: Massachusetts and Connecticut
- Origin: Kent, England
- Members: Lyman Beecher Harriet Elizabeth Beecher Henry Ward Beecher
- Connected families: Foote family Perkins family

Originating in New England, the Beecher family was a political family notable for involvement in religion, civil rights, and social reform in the 19th century. Notable members of the family include clergy (Presbyterians and Congregationalists), educators, authors, and artists. Many of the family were Yale-educated and advocated for abolitionism, temperance, and women's rights. Some of the family provided material or ideological support to the Union in the American Civil War. The family is of English descent.

Locations named after persons of this family include Beecher, Illinois, named after Henry Ward Beecher; and Beecher Island, named after Lt. Fredrick H. Beecher.

== History ==
The American Beecher family began with John Beecher from Kent, England. Along with his wife and son Isaac, the Beechers embarked with a company of emigrants and arrived in Boston on June 26, 1637. During its early days, Boston welcomed all Puritan emigrants, though many of these emigrants were not content to settle in the vicinity of Boston, owing, in part, to the difference in religious opinions. In September of that year, John was a member of an expedition party to explore the surrounding lands for plantation settlement. He was one of seven men left to winter in what would become New Haven, Connecticut. John died during that winter. His bones were discovered in 1750 in digging for a cellar of a stone house. The main body of settlers arrived in New Haven harbor in April, 1638. Isaac Beecher was then fifteen years old. From him all the New Haven families of the name are said to have descended, and from whence the name has spread throughout the surrounding country, numbering, among the direct descendants, the West Haven branch of the Beecher family and the Lyman Beecher family, which would become an American religious force throughout the 19th century.

== Immediate family ==
=== Lyman Beecher (1775–1863) ===
Presbyterian minister, American Temperance Society co-founder and leader. Beecher was born in New Haven, Connecticut, to David Beecher, a blacksmith, and Esther Hawley Lyman. His mother died shortly after his birth, and he was committed to the care of his uncle Lot Benton, as W. Bray, and at the age of eighteen entered Yale, graduating in 1797. He spent 1798 in Yale Divinity School under the tutelage of his mentor Timothy Dwight. He was president of Lane Theological Seminary, in Cincinnati.

=== Catharine Esther Beecher (1800–1878) ===
American educator known for her forthright opinions on female education as well as her vehement support of the many benefits of the incorporation of kindergarten into children's education.

=== William Henry Beecher (1802–1889) ===
American minister who was called "The Unlucky" because misfortune attended all his ventures.

=== Harriet Elizabeth Beecher (1811–1896) ===
American abolitionist and author, best known for her novel Uncle Tom's Cabin (1852), which depicts the harsh conditions for enslaved African Americans. The book reached millions as a novel and play, and became influential in the United States and Great Britain, energizing anti-slavery forces in the American North, while provoking widespread anger in the South. Stowe wrote more than 30 books, including novels, three travel memoirs, and collections of articles and letters. She was influential for both her writings and her public stances on social issues of the day.

=== Henry Ward Beecher (1813–1887) ===
American Congregationalist clergyman, social reformer, and speaker, known for his support of the abolition of slavery, his emphasis on God's love, and his 1875 adultery trial. Henry attended Amherst College in 1834 and Lane Theological Seminary in 1837 before serving as a minister in Indianapolis and Lawrenceburg, Indiana.

=== Charles Beecher (1815–1900) ===
American minister, composer of religious hymns and a prolific author.

=== Isabella Beecher (1822–1907) ===
Leader, lecturer and activist in the American suffragist movement.

=== Thomas Kinnicut Beecher (1824–1900) ===
American preacher and the principal of several schools. He lived in Litchfield, Connecticut, Boston, Massachusetts, Cincinnati, Ohio, and Elmira, New York. There is a memorial statue built in Elmira, where he spent much of his life. He was a close friend of Mark Twain and married him to Olivia Langdon.

=== James Chaplin Beecher (1828–1886) ===
American Congregationalist minister and colonel for the Union Army during the American Civil War.

== Notable members ==
=== Thomas Clap Perkins (1798–1870) ===
American lawyer and politician.

=== Frederic Beecher Perkins (1828–1899) ===
American editor, writer, and librarian.

=== Charlotte Perkins Gilman (1860–1935) ===
American feminist, sociologist, novelist, writer of short stories, poetry, and nonfiction, and a lecturer for social reform. She was a utopian feminist and served as a role model for future generations of feminists because of her unorthodox concepts and lifestyle. Her best remembered work today is her semi-autobiographical short story "The Yellow Wallpaper" which she wrote after a severe bout of postpartum psychosis.

== Family tree ==
The following is a brief family tree of the Beecher family, and its many notable members:

John Beecher emigrated to America 1637 birth. unknown (died 1638)
Isaac Beecher emigrated to America 1637 birth. 1623 (died 1690)
Joseph Beecher birth. 1647 (unknown)
Joseph Beecher birth. 1670 (died unknown)
Nathaniel Beecher birth. 1706 (died 1786)
David Beecher birth. 1738 (died 1805)
Lyman Beecher birth. 1775 (died 1863)

Nathaniel Foote emigrated to America 1633 birth. abt. 1593 (died 1644)
Nathaniel Foote emigrated to America 1633 birth. abt. 1620 (died 1655)
Nathaniel Foote birth. 1647 (died 1703)
Nathaniel Foote birth. 1682 (died 1774)
Daniel Foote birth. 1716 (died 1801)
Eli Foote birth. 1747 (died unknown)
Roxana Ward Foote birth. 1775 (died 1816)

Beecher family tree (Lyman Beecher)

Roxana Ward Beecher (Foote) (1775–1816) | Lyman Beecher (1775–1863) | Harriet Beecher (Porter) (–1835)
Isabella Beecher (1822-1907) | Thomas Kinnicut Beecher (1824-1900) | James Chaplin Beecher (1828–1886)
Catharine Beecher (1800-1878) | William Henry Beecher (1802-1889) | Edward Beecher (1803-1895) | Mary Beecher (1805-1900) | George Beecher (1809-1843) | Harriet Elizabeth Beecher (1811-1896) | Henry Ward Beecher (1813-1887) | Charles Beecher (1815–1900)

=== Descendants of Lyman Beecher ===
- Lyman Beecher (1775–1863), son of David Beecher and Esther Hawley Lyman
  - Catharine Esther Beecher (1800–1878) was an educator and women's-rights activist
  - William Henry Beecher (1802–1889), a Congregational minister in Ohio, New York, and Massachusetts
  - Edward Beecher (1803–1895) helped organize Illinois' first anti-slavery society, Yale graduate; married Isabella Jones
  - Mary Foote Beecher (1805–1900), married Thomas Clap Perkins (1798–1870) in 1827; Perkins was the brother-in-law of Roger Sherman Baldwin
    - Frederic Beecher Perkins (1828–1899), library director in Boston, MA and San Francisco, CA, and author; married Mary Ann Fitch Westcott. They had two children including
      - Thomas Adie Perkins (b. 1859)
      - Charlotte Perkins (1860–1935), feminist; m. Charles Walter Stetson in 1884 and had one child, divorced in 1894; married her first cousin George Houghton Gilman in 1900 (see below)
    - Emily Baldwin Perkins (1829–1912), married Edward Everett Hale in 1852 and had eight sons and one daughter, Ellen Day Hale (1855–1940), an artist
    - Charles E. Perkins (b. 1832)
    - Catherine Beecher Perkins (b. 1836), married William Charles Gilman. They had four children, including
      - George Houghton Gilman
  - Harriet Beecher (1808–1808)
  - George Beecher (1809–1843) Yale graduate, m. Sarah Buckingham in 1837
  - Harriet Elizabeth Beecher (1811–1896), wrote Uncle Tom's Cabin; m. Calvin Stowe (1802–1886) in 1836
    - Harriet (Hattie) Beecher Stowe (1836–1907)
    - Eliza Tyler Stowe (1836–1912)
    - Henry Ellis Stowe (1838–1857)
    - Frederic William Stowe (1840–1871)
    - Georgiana May Stowe (1843–1890) m. Henry Freeman Allen (1838–1914)
    - Samuel Charles Stowe (1848–1849)
    - Charles Edward Stowe (1850–1934) m. Susan Munroe
      - Lyman Beecher Stowe (1880–1963) m. Hilda Robinson Smith
        - David Beecher Stowe (b.1916)
          - Charles Robinson Beecher Stowe (1949–)
          - Richard Mather Anthony Stowe (1953–)
          - Henry Beecher Stowe (1964–)
        - Robinson Smith Beecher Stowe (b.1918)
          - Ellen Robinson Stowe (1956–)
      - Leslie Munroe Stowe (1883–1887)
      - Hilda Stowe (1887–1969) m. James Donnelly
  - Henry Ward Beecher (1813–1887), married Eunice White Bullard (1812–1897) in 1837; namesake of Beecher, Illinois
    - Harriet Eliza Beecher (1838–1911 m. Samuel Scoville (1834–1902)
    - Henry Barton Beecher (1842–1916) m. Harriet Jone Benedict (b. 1841)
      - Kate Eunice Beecher (1864–1890)
      - Henry (Harry) Ward Beecher (1867–1948) m. Mary (May) Frances Beecher
        - Margaret Wardington Beecher (1901–1978 m. Alfred Taussig Abeles (1891–1983)
          - Alfred Beecher Abeles (1923–1945)
          - Shirley Elling Abeles (1926–2006)
          - John Henry Abeles (1935–2010)
        - Henry Ward Beecher III (1903–1986)
        - Lyman Beecher (b. 1905)
      - Margaret Humphey Beecher (1868–1949)
    - George Lyman Beecher (b. 1844)
    - Katherine Esther Beecher (b. 1846)
    - William Constantine Beecher (1849–1928)
    - Alfred Beecher (b. 1852)
    - Herbert Foote Beecher (b. 1854)
  - Charles Beecher (1815–1900) married Sarah Leland Coffin (1815–1897) in 1840.
    - Frederick Henry Beecher (1841–1868), died at the Battle of Beecher Island, Beecher Island being posthumously named after him.
    - Charles McCulloch Beecher (1843–1906)
    - Helen Louisa Beecher (1847–1901)
    - Mary Isabella Beecher (1849–1928) m. George Warren Noyes (1842–1927)
    - Esther (Essie) Lyman Beecher (1852–1867)
    - Edith Harriet Beecher (1854–1867)
  - Frederick C Beecher (1818–1820)
  - Isabella Holmes Beecher (1822–1907), m. John Hooker (1816–1901) in 1841
  - Thomas Kinnicut Beecher (1824–1900), a Congregational minister in Elmira, New York, married Olivia Day (1826–1853), the daughter of the president of Yale, Jeremiah Day, in 1851, and after her untimely death married her cousin Frances Juliana Jones (1826–1905), one of the granddaughters of Noah Webster, in 1857.
  - James Chaplin Beecher (1828–1886), colonel of the 35th United States Colored Troops.

== Gallery ==
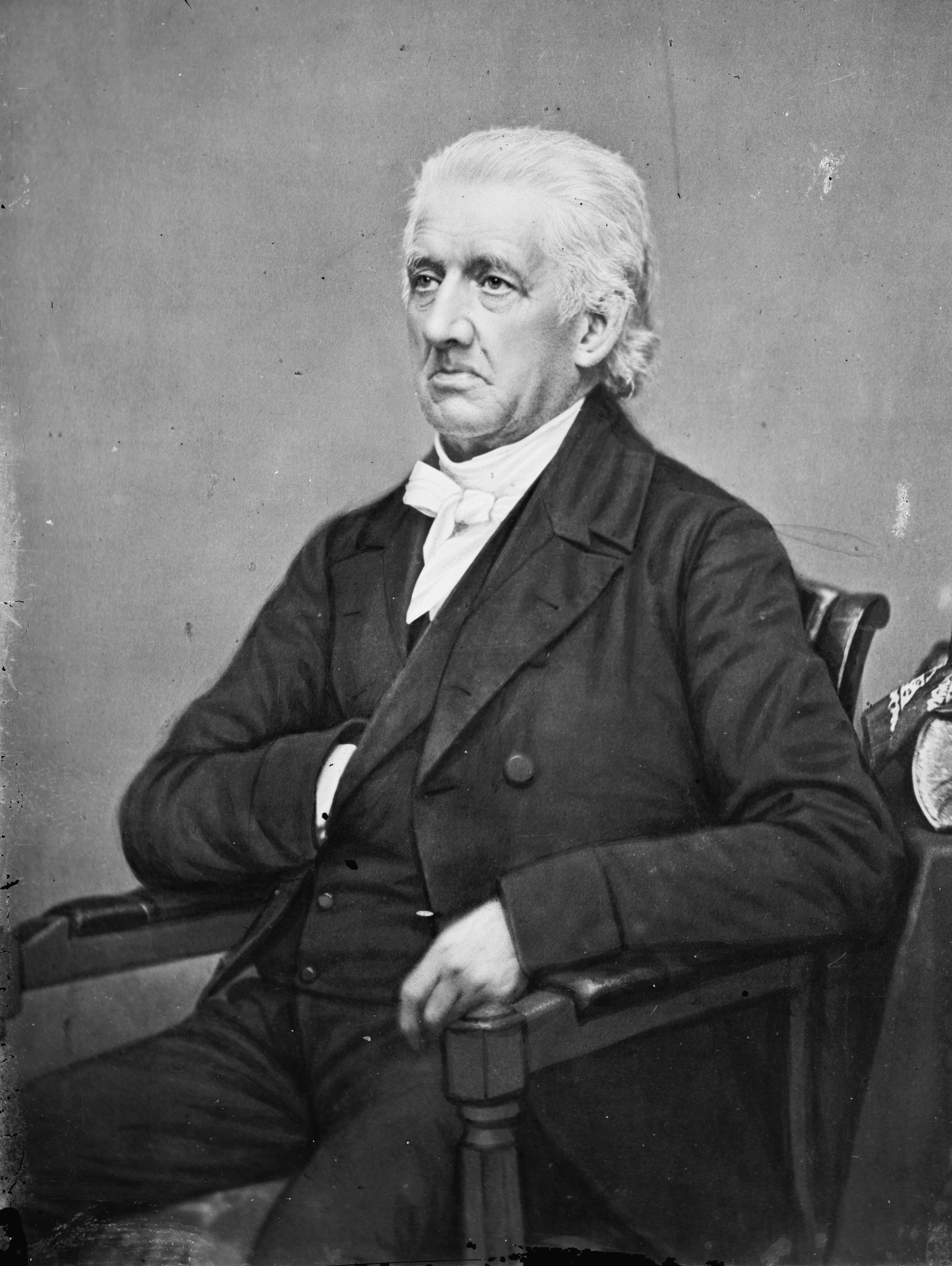
Lyman Beecher (1775–1863)

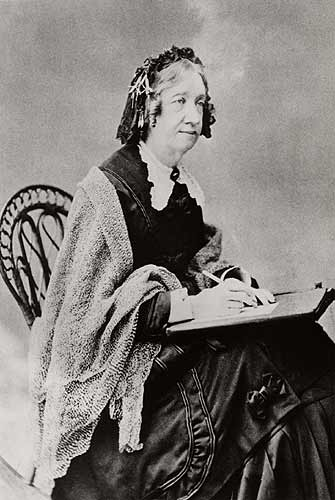
Catharine Beecher (1800–1878)

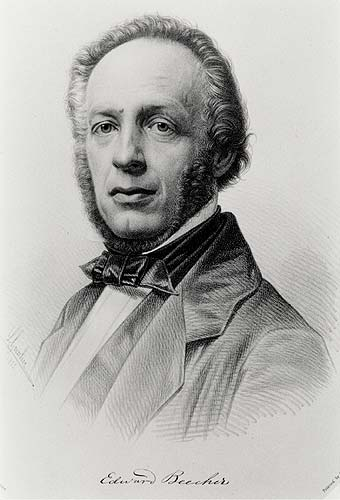
Edward Beecher (1803–1895)

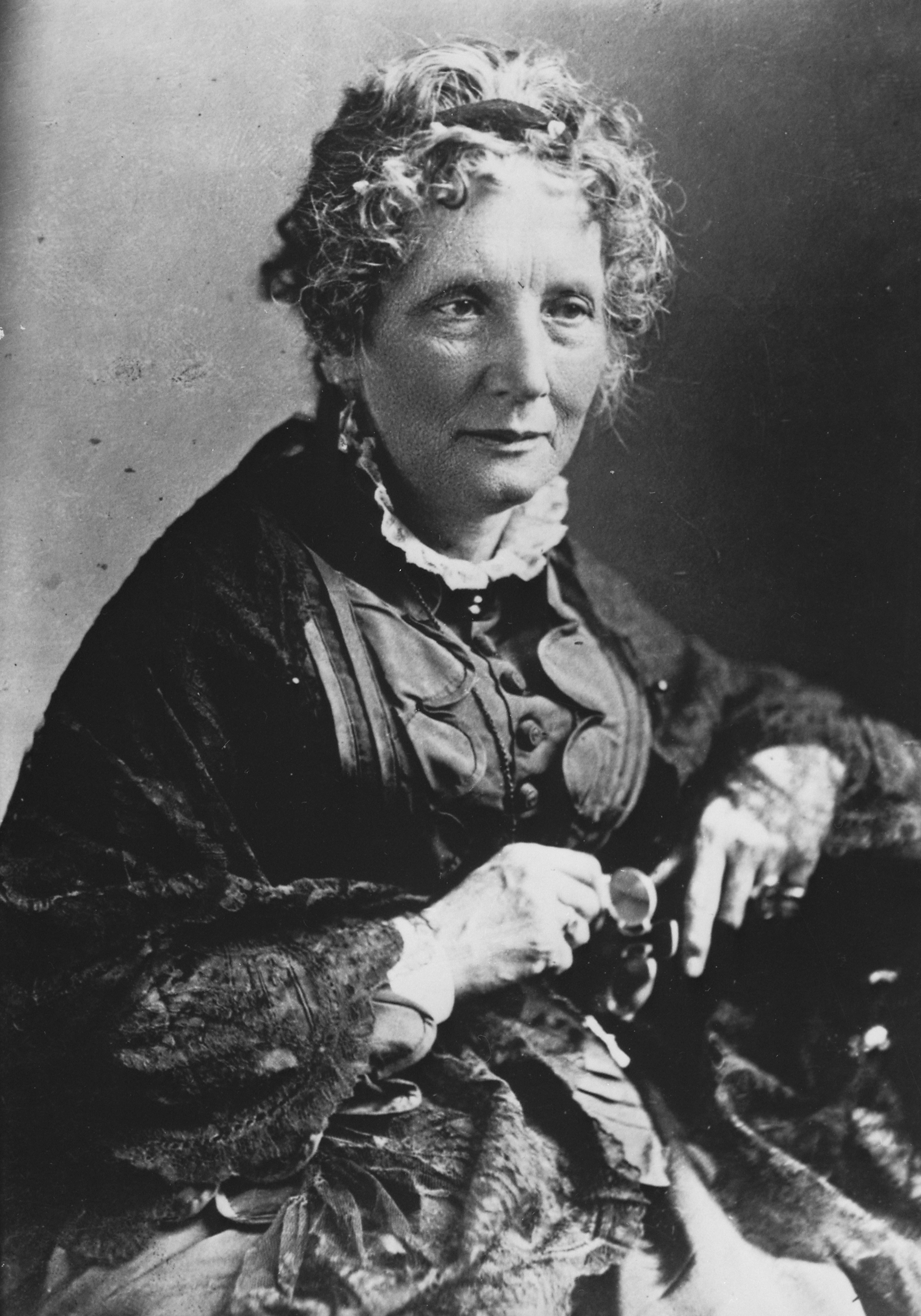
Harriet Beecher Stowe (1811–1896)

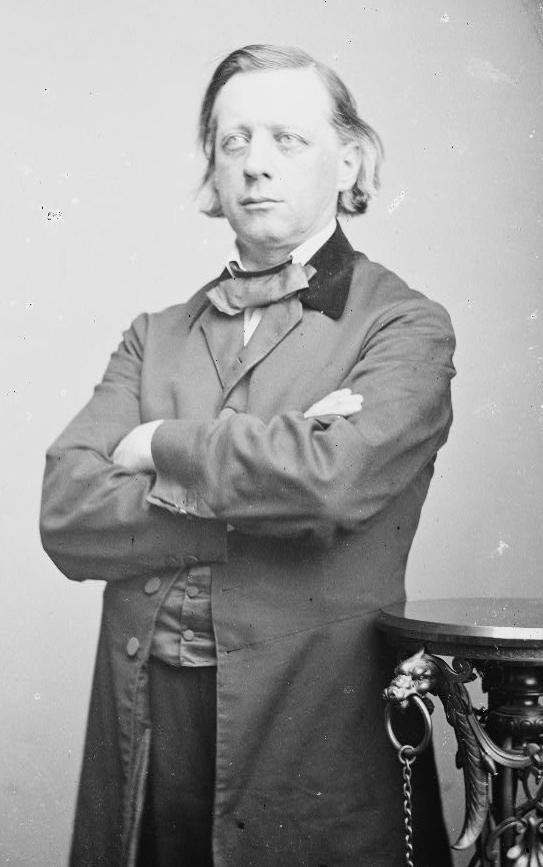
Henry Ward Beecher (1813–1887)

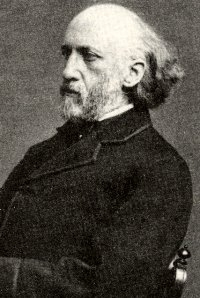
Charles Beecher (1815–1900)

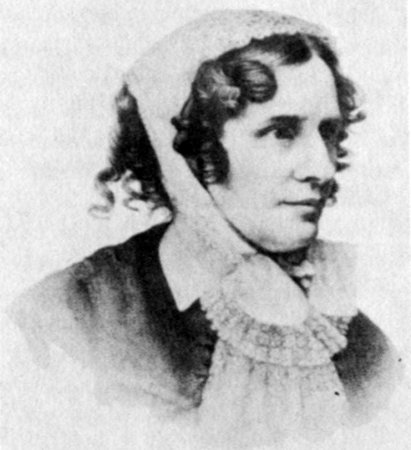
Isabella Beecher Hooker (1822–1907)

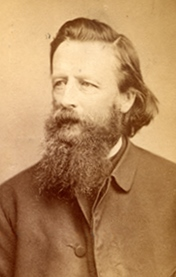
Thomas K. Beecher (1824-1900)

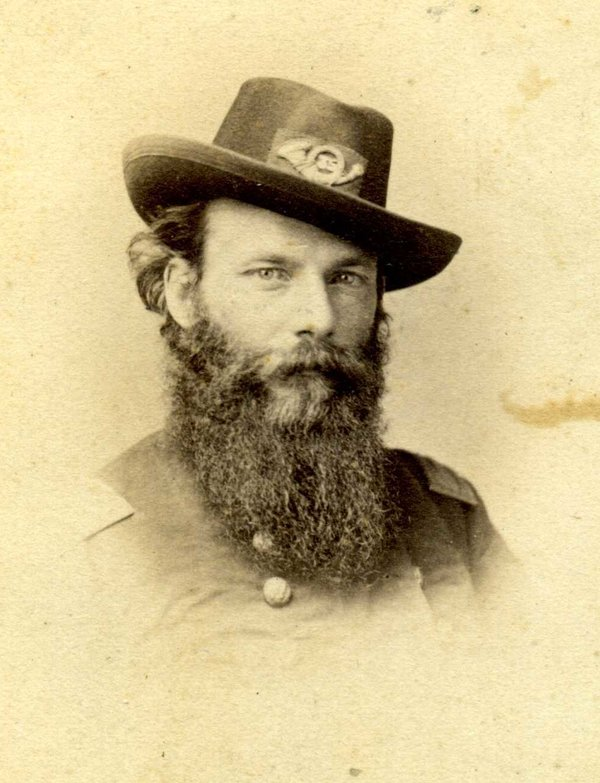
James Chaplin Beecher (1828-1886)

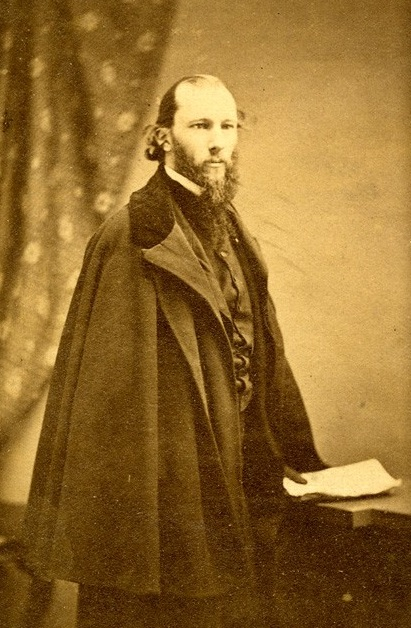
Frederic Beecher Perkins (1828-1899)

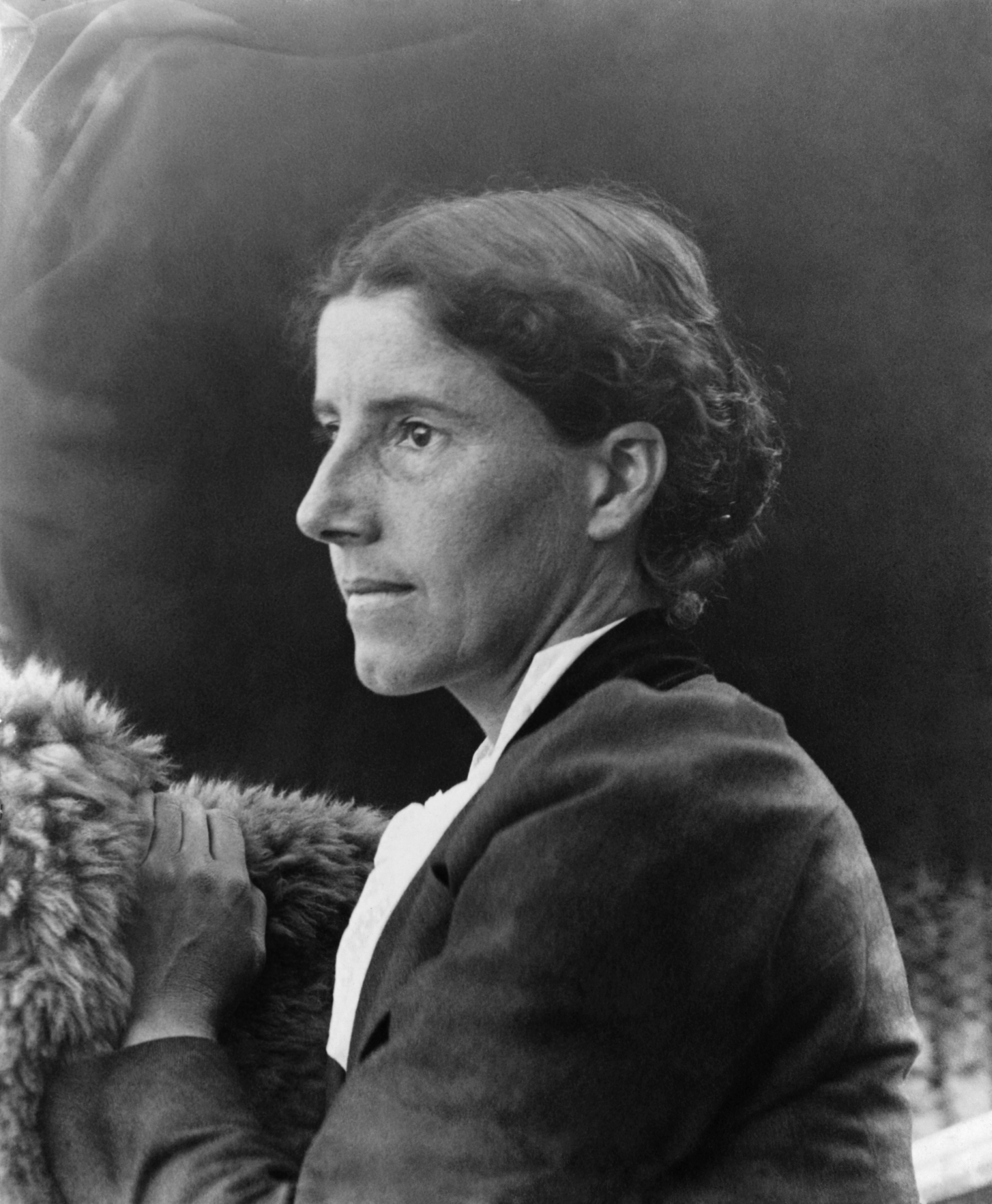
Charlotte Perkins Gilman (1860–1935)

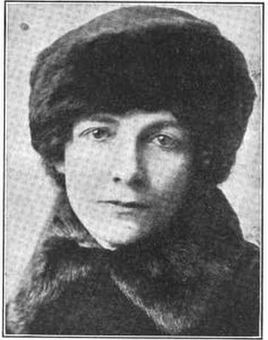
Clare Beecher Kummer (1873–1958), granddaughter of Edward Beecher
