= James Chaplin Beecher =

American missionary and Civil War officer (1828–1886)

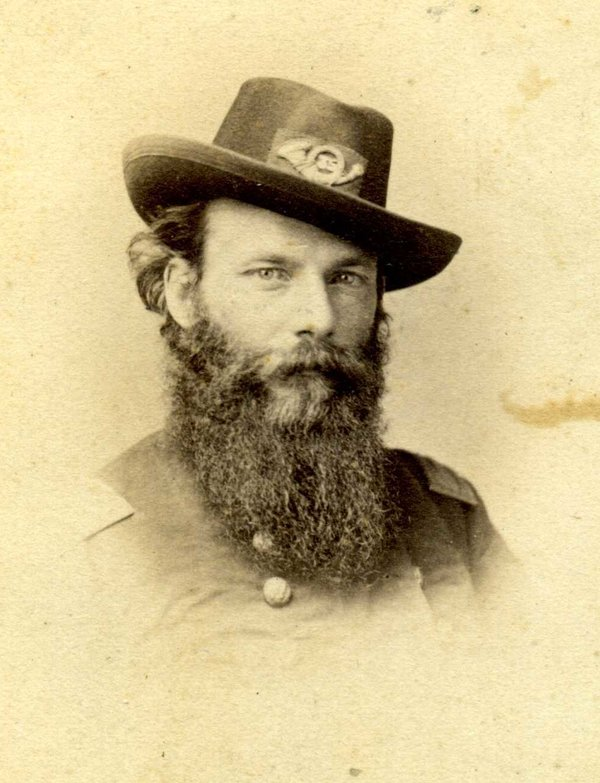
- James Chaplin Beecher
- Born: January 8, 1828; Boston, Massachusetts, US
- Died: August 25, 1886 (aged 58); Elmira, New York
- Occupations: Protestant clergyman, missionary Union Civil War officer
- Spouses: Annie Goodwin (died); Frances Johnson
- Children: Katharine Esther Beecher; Mary Frances Beecher; Margaret Beecher Ward
- Parent(s): Lyman and Harriet Porter Beecher

Signature
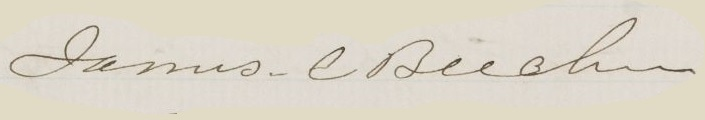

James Chaplin Beecher (January 8, 1828 – August 25, 1886), was an American Congregationalist minister and Colonel for the Union Army during the American Civil War. He came from the Beecher family, a prominent 19th century American religious family.

== Parents and siblings ==
James Chaplin Beecher was born in Boston, Massachusetts, and the youngest child of Lyman Beecher and Harriet Porter Beecher. Lyman was a Presbyterian minister who became best known as a revivalist and social reformer in the years before the American Civil War. His noted half-siblings include; Harriet Beecher Stowe, famed abolitionist and author of the novel Uncle Tom’s Cabin, Catharine Beecher, noted educator and author, Henry Ward Beecher, a famous preacher and abolitionist, and Charles Beecher and Edward Beecher. His sister, Isabella Beecher Hooker, was a leader and activist in the American Suffragists movement, and his brother, Thomas K. Beecher, was a preacher and educator.

== Early life ==
James was educated at Lane Theological Seminary in Walnut Hills, within Cincinnati, Ohio, of which his father was president. He entered Dartmouth College and graduated in 1848. James served for five years as ship's officer in the East India trade. After a couple of years serving a coaster which traded along the eastern U.S. coast, James took up the study of theology at Andover Theological Seminary. During his time at Andover, James married Anne Morse, a widow with a young daughter. In May, 1856, James was ordained a minister of the Congregational Church. Soon after his ordination, James and Anne left for China to be missionaries in Canton and Hong Kong. In 1859, Anne Beecher returned to America for health reasons. During a correspondence with Isabella Beecher Hooker, James admitted to his sister that Anne was suffering from drug and alcohol addiction. Anne went to Gleason’s sanitarium in Elmira, New York for their water cure treatment before she was committed to an asylum in June 1860.

== American Civil War ==
James remained in China until the outbreak of the Civil War. Upon returning home, James quickly enlisted in the army. The "Beecher's Bibles," and "Beecher's Pets," nicknames of the 1st Long Island Regiment (later the 67th New York Infantry), would be Beecher’s first assignment as chaplain. Soon after, he would take charge of the 141st New York Volunteer Infantry. The heavy demands of leading a regiment and the increasing concerns of Anne’s health, James began to break down and briefly returned to civilian life until Anne’s death in 1863. As the war progressed, James rejoined the army and accepted the promotion of lieutenant-colonel and was appointed to recruit an African American regiment, the 1st North Carolina Colored Infantry (35th Regiment, United States Colored Infantry). The regiment would come to be called the 35th United States Colored Troops, and fought at the Battle of Olustee, Florida and Honey Hill, South Carolina. He complained that his regiment was being used to perform menial work for white regiments instead of fighting and that this was bad for his troops' morale. Beecher was wounded during the Battle of Honey Hill in November 1864 and rejoined his regiment in February 1865 near Charleston, S.C. In 1866, James Beecher was mustered out of service rising to the rank of Brevet Brigadier General. A New Bern chapter of the Grand Army of the Republic, J. C. Beecher Post 22, was named in his honor.

== Return to ministry ==
In 1864, James married Francis “Frankie” Johnson, of Guilford, Connecticut and after the Civil War, James re-entered the ministry. The two adopted three daughters and opened a school in Jacksonville, Florida for newly emancipated people. After serving as pastor for nine months at Thomas Beecher’s church in Elmira, New York, James would have charge of two churches: one at Owego, New York in 1867 and one in Poughkeepsie, New York in 1870. Three years later, James would resign his position as Pastor of the Poughkeepsie Congregational church, where he was “extremely popular and in receipt of a large salary.” James would build a home near what would be called “Beecher Lake,” and remove himself from the pastoral life of the church. In 1881 Henry Ward Beecher asked James to take over Plymouth Church. James reluctantly agreed, he preferred a more rural life. After years of mental suffering, James spent some time at the Middletown Asylum in Middletown, New York and then at Dr. Gleason's Water Cure Sanitarium in Elmira, New York, where his first wife had sought help. On the evening of August 25, 1886, after an afternoon at the shooting range with others, James Beecher "suddenly went to his room and taking a rifle placed the muzzle in his mouth and fired, killing himself instantly."

== See also ==
- James C. Beecher House
- Beecher family
- List of American Civil War brevet generals (Union)

== Works cited ==
- Reid, Richard M. (2008). Freedom for Themselves: North Carolina's Black Soldiers in the Civil War Era. Chapel Hill, North Carolina: University of North Carolina Press. ISBN 0-8078-3174-3.
