= Emily Baldwin =

First Lady of Connecticut (1796–1874)

Emily Pitkin (Perkins) Baldwin (January 1, 1796 – January 29, 1874), was born in Hartford, Connecticut, to Enoch Perkins and Hannah Pitkin. On October 25, 1820, she married Roger Sherman Baldwin, who became the governor of Connecticut in 1844 and a US Senator in 1847. Emily and Roger had nine children.

== Children ==
1. Edward Law Baldwin (October 1, 1822 – July 6, 1848)
2. Elizabeth Wooster Baldwin (August 8, 1824 – September 10, 1912)
3. Roger Sherman Baldwin (July 4, 1826 – November 12, 1856)
4. Ebenezer Simeon Baldwin (March 4, 1828 – April 28, 1836)
5. Henrietta Perkins Baldwin (April 3, 1830 – January 15, 1910)
6. George William Baldwin (April 24, 1832 – January 30, 1930)
7. Emily Frances Baldwin (December 13, 1834 – April 27, 1836)
8. Ebenezer Charles Baldwin (September 17, 1837 – December 10, 1937)
9. Simeon E. Baldwin (February 5, 1840 – January 30, 1927)

== Ancestry ==
Emily was also an aunt to Charlotte Perkins Gilman, Frederic Beecher Perkins and US Representative Timothy Pitkin; an aunt-by-marriage to author Edward Everett Hale, the mother of Connecticut Governor and Chief Justice Simeon E. Baldwin; daughter-in-law to US Representative and Judge Simeon Baldwin; mother-in-law to Massachusetts Chief Justice Dwight Foster; grandmother of New York Supreme Court Justice Edward Baldwin Whitney and attorneys Roger Sherman Baldwin Foster and Reginald Foster; the granddaughter of the Rev. Timothy Pitkin (Yale 1747), great-granddaughter Governor William Pitkin and the Reverend Thomas Clap, who was the fifth President of Yale College; a descendant of Governors George Wyllys and John Haynes of Connecticut and Governor Thomas Dudley of the Massachusetts Bay Colony; and the Governor William Bradford of the Plymouth Colony.

In 1786, her father, Enoch Perkins, began what has become the oldest law firm in continuous practice in the United States, now known as Howard, Kohn, Sprague & FitzGerald; and his original law practice shingle is one of the firm's most prized heirlooms. In 1820, her brother, Thomas Clap Perkins, joined their father's law practice. Thomas Perkins married Mary Foote Beecher, daughter of Lyman Beecher and the sister of author Harriet Beecher Stowe. In 1855, Thomas Perkins's son Charles expanded the firm's litigation practice and became widely recognized as one of the State Capital's finest trial lawyers.

Charles Perkins also became a close friend and legal counselor to Samuel Clemens, known to most by his pen name Mark Twain. In 1889, Charles Perkins' son Arthur continued the Perkins family stewardship of the firm until his death in 1932. Arthur Perkins was also a founding member of the Appalachian Trail Association and became known as the "Father of the Appalachian Trail," which spans from Georgia to Maine.
