= Joseph Twichell =

American writer and Congregational minister (1838–1918)

Joseph Hopkins Twichell
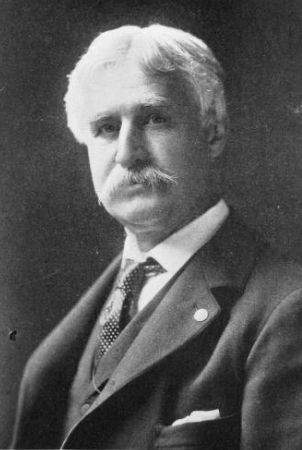
- Twichell circa 1897
- Born: November 30, 1838; Southington, Connecticut, United States
- Died: December 20, 1918 (aged 80); Hartford, Connecticut, United States
- Occupation: Pastor
- Title: Reverend

Reverend Joseph Hopkins Twichell (November 30, 1838 – December 20, 1918) was a writer and Congregational minister from Hartford, Connecticut. He was a close friend of writer Mark Twain for over forty years and is believed to be the model for the character "Harris" in A Tramp Abroad.

Twain and Twichell met at a church social after the Civil War when Twichell was pastor of Asylum Hill Congregational Church in Hartford, where he served for almost 50 years. Reverend Twichell performed Twain's wedding and christened his children. He counseled the author on literary as well as personal matters for the rest of his life. A scholar and devout Christian, Twichell was described as "a man with an exuberant sense of humor, and a profound understanding of the frailties of mankind."

== Early life and education ==
Twichell was born in Southington, Connecticut, to Edward Twichell and Selina Delight Carter. He attended the Lewis Academy in Southington and studied at Yale from 1855 to 1859. He rowed on the Yale crew the first time that Yale defeated Harvard.

From 1859 to 1861, Twichell attended Union Theological Seminary, New York City but left to join the Union Army when the Civil War began.

== Civil War ==
In 1861 when the American Civil War broke out, Twichell was still attending Union Theological Seminary, and was not yet ordained. Strongly pro-abolition, he enlisted in the Union Army a few weeks after the Confederacy fired upon Fort Sumter in April.

Twichell became chaplain of the 71st New York State Volunteers, one of five regiments of the Excelsior Brigade commanded by General Daniel E. Sickles. The regiment was largely made up of working-class Irish Catholics from lower Manhattan, and many of them were immigrants. In a letter to his father, he remarked:

"If you ask why I fixed upon this regiment, composed as it is of rough, wicked men, I answer, that was the very reason. I should not expect a revival, but I should expect to make some good impressions by treating with kindness a class of men who are little used to it."

He accompanied the regiment through three years of battle including the Peninsula Campaign, the Second Bull Run Campaign, Fredericksburg, Chancellorsville, Gettysburg, Spotsylvania and the Wilderness.

In July 1861, after the battle of Bull Run, the Excelsior Brigade was ordered to Washington, D.C. That fall, the brigade marched east through Maryland, with Maj. Gen. Joseph Hooker’s division of the army’s Third Corps, to help defend the mouth of the Potomac River from Confederate harassment.

During the war, he became a protege of Reverend Horace Bushnell, a leading theologian and civic reformer.

== Career ==
After the Civil War, he completed seminary studies and graduated in 1865 from the Andover Seminary in Andover, Massachusetts. He became pastor at the Asylum Hill Congregational Church in Hartford, Connecticut at the recommendation of Horace Bushnell. Twichell met author Samuel Clemens, better known as Mark Twain, in October 1868 and they formed a deep friendship. In 1870, Twitchell, along with Rev. Thomas K. Beecher, married Clemens to Olivia Langdon at the Langdon home in Elmira, NY.

In 1871, Twichell became a supporter of the Chinese Educational Mission which was supervised by Yung Wing. In 1874, Twichell accompanied Yung Wing to Peru to investigate the living conditions of Chinese citizens working there.

Twichell encouraged Clemens to write about his piloting career on the Mississippi River, as he had told the minister many stories from that time. Clemens and Twichell undertook a walking trip of over 100 miles to Boston in 1874. It was aborted on the second day when they decided to take the train.

They followed the news reports of the adultery scandal involving Henry Ward Beecher, who was a brother of their mutual friend, Rev. Thomas K. Beecher, and their sister, author Harriet Beecher Stowe, who had written Uncle Tom's Cabin. Of the scandal, Clemens wrote Twichell, "Mr. Tilton never has been entitled to any sympathy since the day he heard the news & did not go straight & kill Beecher & then humbly seek forgiveness for displaying so much vivacity."(p. 202) He and Twichell attended the trial of Henry Ward Beecher together.

Twichell and Twain traveled together to Bermuda in 1877 and to Germany and Switzerland in 1878. The six week trip through the Black Forest and Swiss Alps in Europe became the basis for Twain's book, A Tramp Abroad.

== Writings ==
- John Winthrop (1891)
- Some Old Puritan Love Letters (1893)

== Personal life ==
Twichell married Julia Harmony Cushman in November 1865 and together they had nine children. Their son Burton Parker Twichell married Katherine Eugenia Pratt, daughter of Charles Millard Pratt.

Their daughter Harmony Twichell (1876–1969) married the composer Charles Ives in 1908.

Twichell died on December 20, 1918.
