= William Beecher =

William Beecher may refer to:

- William Beecher (died 1640), MP for Huntingdon
- William Beecher (died 1651) (1580–1651), English MP for Dover
- Sir William Beecher (died 1694) (1628–1694), English MP for Bedford
- William Henry Beecher (1802–1889), dyspeptic minister called "The Unlucky"
- William M. Beecher (1933–2024), American journalist
