= James C. Beecher House =

Historic house in New York, United States

- U.S. National Register of Historic Places
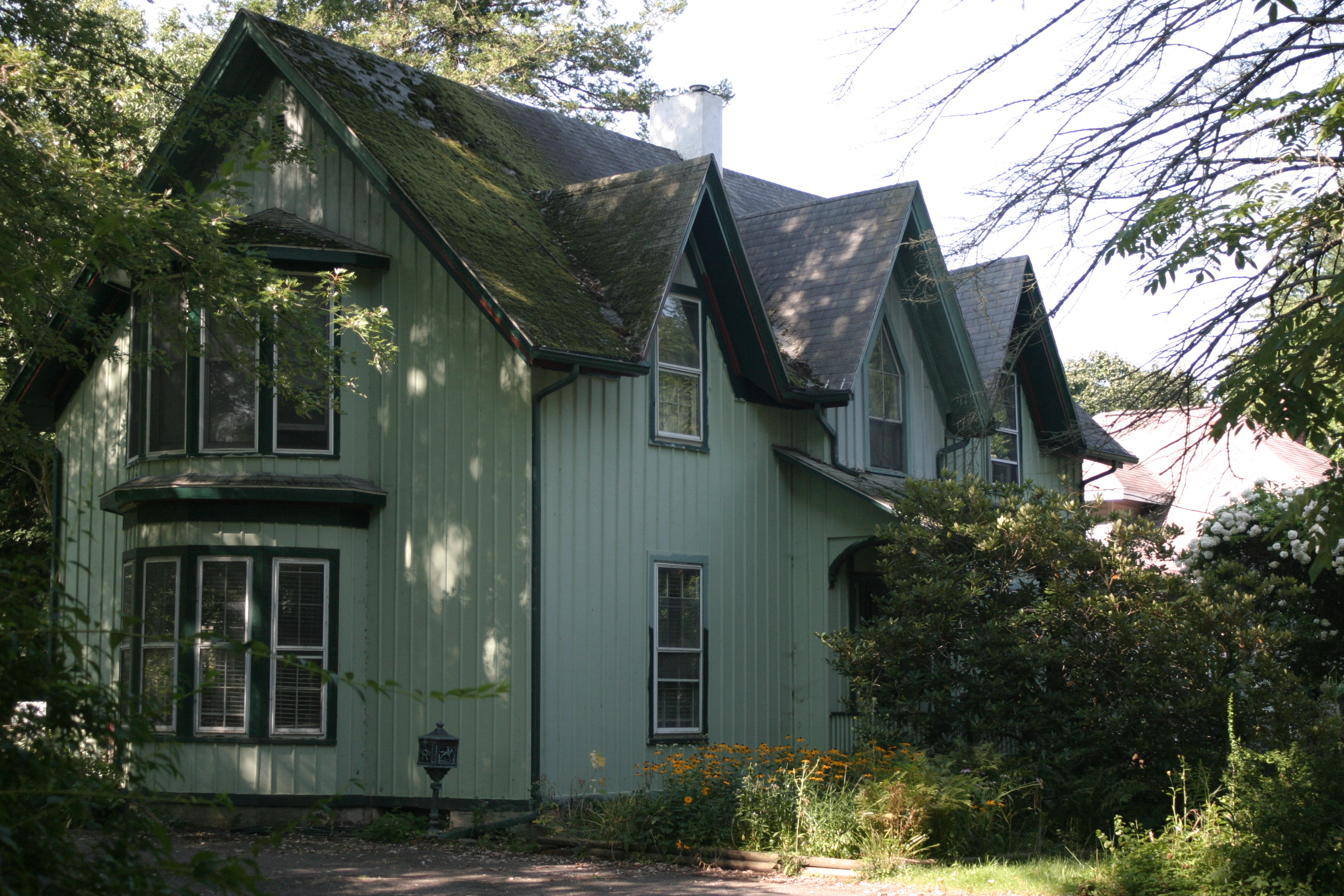

- Location within New York
- Location: 560 5th Ave., Owego, New York
- Coordinates: 42°6′16″N 76°14′46″W
- Built: 1867
- Architectural style: Gothic Revival
- NRHP reference No.: 12000482
- Added to NRHP: July 27, 2012

The James C. Beecher House is a historic house located at 560 5th Avenue in Owego, Tioga County, New York.

== Description and history ==
It is a 2-story, High Victorian Gothic style frame dwelling. It has a steep gable roof with dormers and board-and-batten siding. It was built by James Chaplin Beecher Who, during the Civil War era was the Colonel of the 1st North Carolina Colored Troops (Union) and later the Brigadier General of the 35th United States Colored Troops.

It was listed on the National Register of Historic Places on July 27, 2012.
