= Thomas K. Beecher =

American minister and teacher (1824–1900)

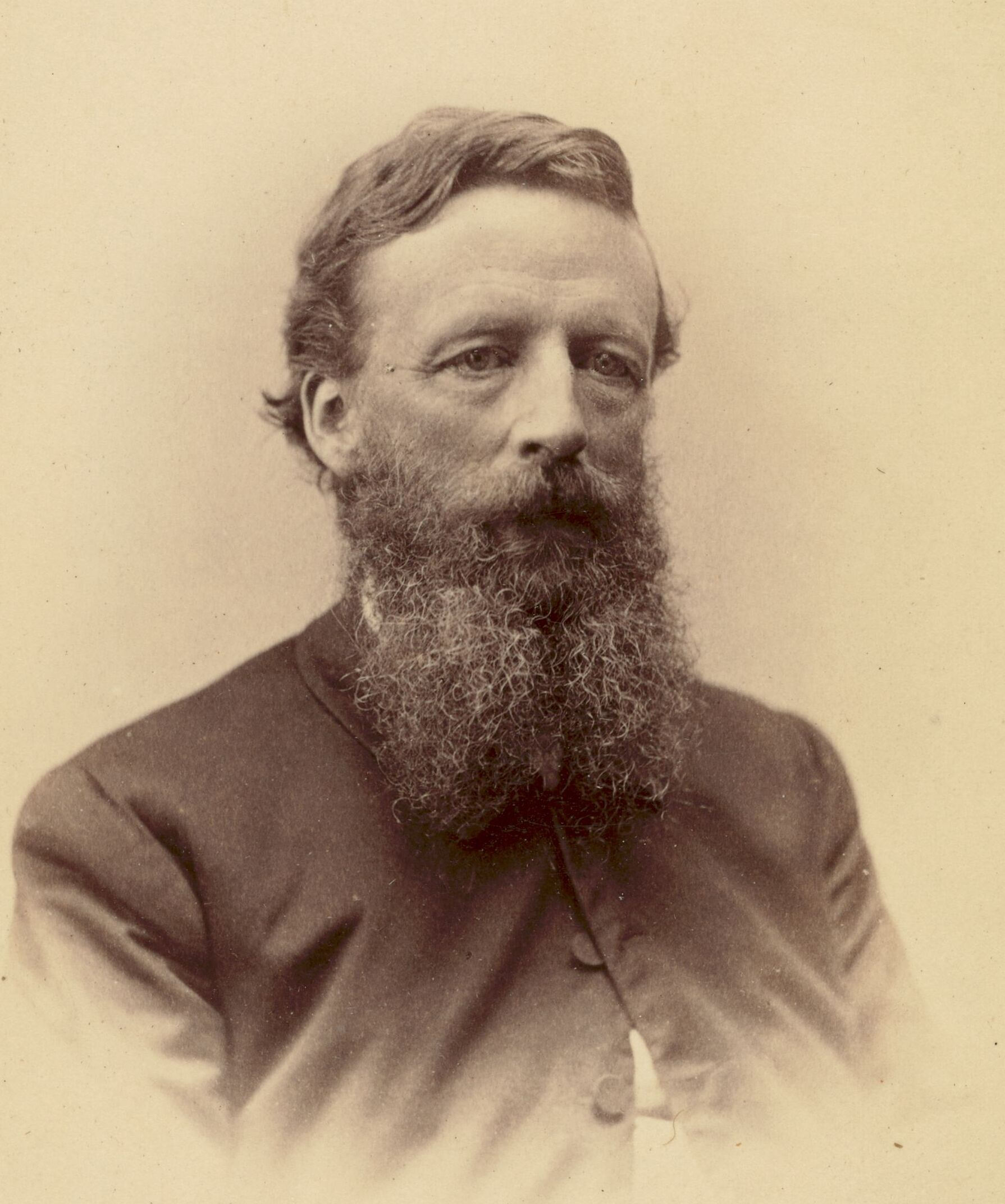
- Thomas Kinnicut Beecher
- Born: Thomas Kinnicut Beecher; February 10, 1824; Litchfield, Connecticut, US
- Died: March 24, 1900 (aged 76); Elmira, New York
- Occupations: Protestant Clergyman; Union Civil War Chaplain
- Parent(s): Lyman and Harriet Porter Beecher

Thomas Kinnicut Beecher (February 10, 1824 - March 14, 1900) was a Congregationalist preacher and the principal of several schools. Also a minister, his father, Lyman Beecher, moved the family from Beecher's birthplace of Litchfield, Connecticut, to Boston, Massachusetts, and Cincinnati, Ohio, by 1832.

After college and some teaching experience, Beecher settled in Elmira, New York, where he became the minister of a Congregational church. His services were popular and he presided over the construction of a new church to accommodate the large congregation. Beecher became a close friend of the writer Sam Clemens (Mark Twain) and presided at Clemens' marriage to Olivia Langdon.

== Early life ==
Thomas K. Beecher was born in Litchfield, Connecticut to Lyman Beecher and his wife Harriet Porter. Thomas Beecher was one of thirteen children, including Henry Ward (who became a noted minister and abolitionist activist), William, Catherine, Edward, Mary, George, Harriet (later known as an anti-slavery activist and author of Uncle Tom's Cabin), Charles, Isabella, and James Beecher.

His father was Presbyterian minister. In 1826 the family moved to Boston, Massachusetts. Several years later, their father was called to another church and they moved to Cincinnati, Ohio in 1832.

From 1836 to 1839, Beecher went to preparatory school in Marietta, Ohio. In 1839, he went to college at Illinois College in Jacksonville, Illinois, graduating in 1843. While there, he was a founder of Sigma Pi Literary Society.

After college, he spent a year with his father in Cincinnati and a year with his brother and minister, Henry Ward Beecher, in Indianapolis, studying theology.

== Career ==
=== Education ===
Beecher worked for a year at the Ohio Medical University, as an aide to the professor of chemistry and pharmacy. Beecher worked formally in several educational institutions. In 1846 he became the principal of the North-East Grammar School in Philadelphia. From 1848 to 1851, he was the head of the High School in Hartford, Connecticut.

=== Ministry ===
Thomas Beecher was ordained at age 28, and he began his preaching career in Brooklyn, in the area of Williamsburg, where his brother Henry Ward Beecher had a congregation. In 1854 Beecher went to the town of Elmira, New York to preach at the Independent Congregational Church. When his services became overcrowded, Beecher held the service at the newly constructed opera house and, weather permitting, at Eldridge Park.

When Beecher arrived, the church was a moderate-sized wooden structure. Now known as Park Church, it is located on the west side of Wisner Park on North Main Street in Elmira. The growing congregation overwhelmed it. After one of his popular services, he asked the congregation if they felt a new church was necessary. Estimates were that a suitable one would cost fifty thousand dollars. The vote was almost unanimous in favor of a new church, and total pledges of about eighty thousand dollars were given toward that goal.

To support its community, the new church also had a facility for social gatherings and events such as banquets and parties, as well as a large hall where the children could play. Beecher started a public library at the church, donating his personal collection. The church held two services; one in the morning, and the other in the evening. (Beecher also ministered to the prisoners of the Elmira Prison Camp).

Later in life, he found that conducting two services was too taxing, and he canceled the evening service. To provide another forum, Beecher founded a club of male youths, who would meet on Tuesday nights. Beecher would ask them to report on something interesting they observed during the previous week. He also sent his pupils to mechanics, locomotive shops, and other places, to learn through observation.

During his preaching career in Elmira, Beecher was the head of the Sunday school run by the Park Church. It had about 700 members, ranging in age from five to past fifty. Different classes were led by volunteers.

=== Civil War ===
"When war broke out, Thomas Beecher worked indefatigably on behalf of the Union cause. He delivered numerous sermons denouncing secession and defending the Union. He also traveled throughout upstate New York to recruit badly needed troops for New York regiments. ...Beecher's joining the 141st New York Regiment in September of 1862—he was mustered in as chaplain on 12 September 1862 and discharged on 10 January 1863—was the culmination of his efforts on behalf of the Union cause."

In 1863 to aid the cause of the Union in the Civil War, which had been underway for two years, Beecher started a regiment with A.S. Diven (the Army depended on wealthier private individuals to recruit men and outfit them with arms, horses, and uniforms), the 107th regiment, which was soon sent to the front. Later, Beecher aided Colonel Hathaway in raising the 141st regiment and would go into the field with them as a chaplain, serving into 1864.

=== Post-war ===
In May 1867, Beecher was again involved with both teaching and preaching. In 1870, along with the Rev. Joseph Twichell, he officiated over the marriage of Samuel Clemens ("Mark Twain") to Olivia Langdon.

== Personal life ==
Beecher married Olivia Day in 1851; she died two years later. In 1857 Beecher married his second wife, Julia Jones. She was his deceased wife's cousin, and granddaughter of Noah Webster, author of Webster's Dictionary.

Beecher moved to Elmira, New York, in 1854 and took residence at the Gleason Sanitarium on Watercure Hill. This was an area of sanitariums established for treatment of tuberculosis (TB), which had no known cure. A combination of rest and good, cold, dry air was considered beneficial. In 1857 a cottage was built for him near the Sanitarium. It was a Victorian home with a library; it had an artesian well in the basement, where Beecher would take plunge baths.

He sailed to South America in due to depleted health in November 1866. He returned on May 1, 1867, feeling rejuvenated. He participated in a range of sports when his health was good enough: Baseball, target shooting, battledore (similar to badminton), cycling, cricket, and croquet. Beecher also enjoyed indoor games of euchre and billiards.

Beecher became a close friend to the famous author Samuel Clemens ("Mark Twain"). Beecher died on March 14, 1900, at the age of 76. His wife Julia survived him. At his funeral service, both a priest and a rabbi spoke.

== Honors ==
- A statue of Beecher was erected at Wisner Park in Elmira.
- T.K. Beecher Elementary School, located in Elmira, was named in his honor.

== See also ==
- New England Congregational Church and Rectory
- Beecher family
