= Thomas Clap Perkins =

American attorney

Thomas C. Perkins
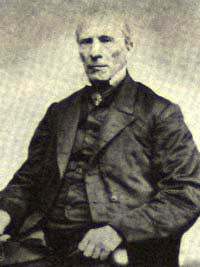

United States Attorney for the District of Connecticut
- In office 1849–1853
- President: Zachary Taylor; Millard Fillmore
- Preceded by: Jonathan Stoddard
- Succeeded by: Elisha S. Abernathy

Personal details
- Born: Thomas Clap Perkins; July 29, 1798 Hartford, Connecticut
- Died: October 11, 1870 (aged 72) Hartford, Connecticut
- Education: Yale (1818)
- Profession: Lawyer; Politician

Thomas Clap Perkins (July 29, 1798 – October 11, 1870) was an American lawyer and politician. He was the brother of Emily Perkins Baldwin, the wife of Connecticut Governor and US Senator Roger Sherman Baldwin.

Perkins was born in Hartford, Connecticut., July 29, 1798. His father was Enoch Perkins of Hartford, and his mother, Anna Pitkin, was a daughter of Rev. Timothy Pitkin, of Farmington, Connecticut. His brother was Rev. George W. Perkins. He graduated from Yale College in 1818. After graduation, he studied law with Seth P. Staples, in New Haven, and in 1820 was admitted to the bar in Hartford, where he practiced his profession for half a century, with distinguished success. He joined the law firm founded by his father in 1786, now called Howard, Kohn, Sprague & FitzGerald, one of the oldest continuously practicing law firms in the US.

He was several times elected to the Connecticut State Senate and Connecticut House of Representatives, and was once elected a Judge of the Connecticut Supreme Court, but declined the position. He also served as the United States attorney for the district of Connecticut. He died in Hartford, Oct. 11, 1870, at the age of 72.

On November 30, 1827, Thomas Perkins married Mary Foote Beecher, the daughter of the Rev Lyman Beecher, D.D. and sister of author Harriet Beecher Stowe. She survived him, with two sons and two daughters. His eldest son was Frederic Beecher Perkins, father of author Charlotte Perkins Gilman. His other son Charles E. Perkins joined his father's law firm and became friend and lawyer to author Mark Twain. Daughter Emily Baldwin Perkins married Edward Everett Hale in 1852.

This article incorporates public domain material from the Yale Obituary Record.
