= William Henry Beecher =

American minister of misfortune (1802–1889)

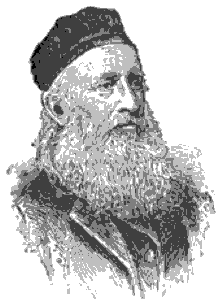
- Born: January 15, 1802; New Haven, Connecticut
- Died: June 23, 1889 (aged 87); Chicago, Illinois
- Resting place: Mount Auburn Cemetery
- Occupation: Clergyman
- Spouse: Katherine Edes (m. 1830)
- Children: 6
- Parents: Lyman Beecher (father); Roxana Foote (mother)
- Relatives: Harriet Beecher Stowe (sister); Henry Ward Beecher (brother); Charles Beecher (brother)

William Henry Beecher (January 15, 1802 – June 23, 1889) was a dyspeptic minister who was called "The Unlucky" because misfortune attended all his ventures.

== Beecher Family ==
William Beecher was born in New Haven, Connecticut, the eldest son of the Calvinist preacher Lyman Beecher and Roxana Foote. He was the brother of Harriet Beecher Stowe, the 19th century abolitionist and writer most famous for her groundbreaking novel Uncle Tom's Cabin, Henry Ward Beecher, pastor of the Plymouth Congregational church, and Charles Beecher.

== Immediate family ==
William Beecher married Katherine Edes on May 12, 1830 in New Haven Connecticut. Of his wedding he wrote:"Was married....No company, no cake, no cards-nothing pleasant about it." William and Katherine had six children: Agnes E. Beecher, Mary Ward Beecher, Lyman Beecher, Roxana Foote (Beecher) Prenzner, Robert E. Beecher, and Grace H. Beecher.

== The Unlucky or "What shall we do with William?" ==
As a child William had a difficult time learning and was not a very good student. He apprenticed as a cabinet-maker and worked as a clerk in stores in Milford and Hartford, Connecticut, as well as New York. He studied theology at Andover but finished his studies under the directions of his father, before being licensed as a minister. He served as the minister of several churches, but each assignment was relatively short and typically ended with some type of discord over salary or a dislike from influential members of the congregation. William served at Middletown, Connecticut; Putnam, Ohio; Batavia, New York; Toledo and Euclid, Ohio; and North Brookfield, Massachusetts. He retired to Chicago, where he lived with his daughters until his death on June 23, 1889. He was buried at Mount Auburn Cemetery.
