= Edward Beecher =

American theologian (1803–1895)

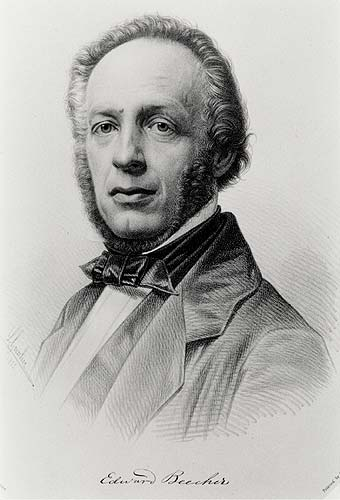
- Born: August 27, 1803; East Hampton, New York
- Died: July 28, 1895 (aged 91); Brooklyn, New York
- Occupation: Theologian
- Spouse: Isabella Jones
- Children: Eleven
- Parent: Lyman Beecher

Edward Beecher (August 27, 1803 – July 28, 1895) was an American theologian, the son of Lyman Beecher and the brother of Harriet Beecher Stowe and Henry Ward Beecher.

== Biography ==
Beecher was born August 27, 1803, in East Hampton, New York. He graduated from Yale College in 1822. After this, he studied theology at Andover Theological School.

In 1826, he became the pastor of Park Street Church in Boston, Massachusetts. Beecher hoped to inspire more Biblical purity among parishioners and, as a result, disciplinary actions at the Park Street Church were at an all-time high under Beecher's tenure. He married Isabella (Porter) Jones in 1829 and together they had eleven children. In 1830, he became the first president of Illinois College at Jacksonville, Illinois, where he remained president for 14 years. He was a close friend of Elijah P. Lovejoy and helped organize the first anti-slavery society in Illinois. His wife, Isabella, wrote to his sister, Harriet Beecher Stowe, to inspire her to write Uncle Tom's Cabin.

He returned to Boston in 1844. He was the pastor of Salem Street Church until 1855, when he returned to Illinois and became the pastor of the First Congregational Church of Galesburg. In 1871 he settled in Brooklyn, New York, where from 1885 to 1889 he was pastor of the Parkville church. He died there on July 28, 1895.

He was senior editor of The Congregationalist (1849—1855), and an associate editor of the Christian Union from 1870.

== Published works ==
- Addresses on the Kingdom of God (1827)
- Six Sermons on the Nature, Importance, and Means of Eminent Holiness throughout the Church (New York, 1835)
- History of the Alton Riots (1837)
- Statement of Anti-Slavery Principles (1837)
- Narrative of Riots at Alton: in Connection with the Death of Rev. Elijah P. Lovejoy (1838)
- Baptism, With Reference to its Import and Modes (1849)
- The Conflict of Ages: or, The Great Debate on the Moral Relations of God and Man (1853)
- The Papal Conspiracy Exposed, and Protestantism Defended: in the Light of Reason, History & Scripture (1855)
- Death Not Life, or, The Destruction of the Wicked (Commonly Called Annihilation) Established and Endless Misery Disproved by a Collection and Explanation of all Passages on Future Punishment (1859)
- The Concord of Ages (1860)
- Secret Societies: A Discussion of their Character and Claims (1867)
- History of Opinions on the Scriptural Doctrine of Future Retribution (1878)

== See also ==
Beecher family
