= Olivia Langdon Clemens =

Wife of Mark Twain (1845–1904)

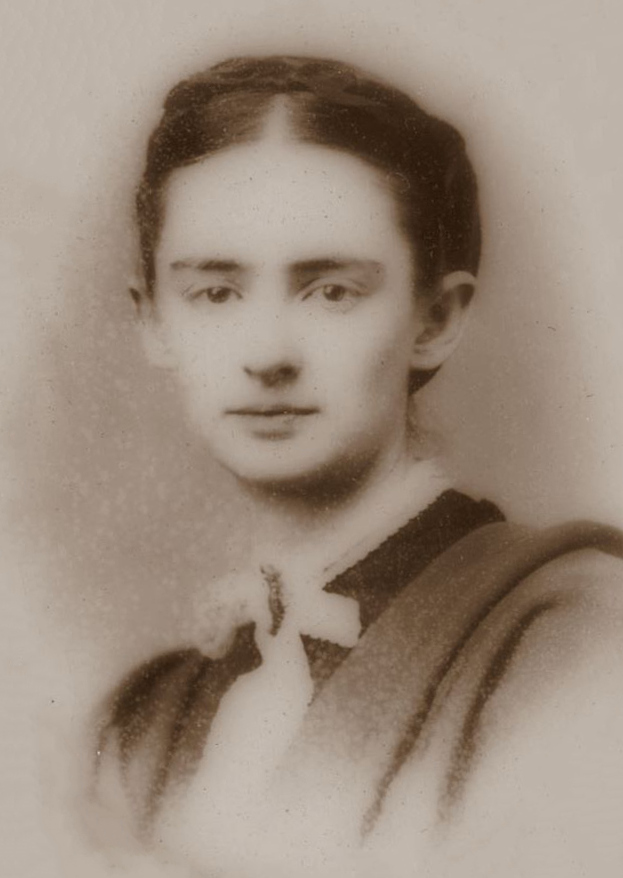
- Olivia (1869; age 23)
- Born: Olivia Iona Louise Langdon; November 27, 1845; Elmira, New York, U.S.
- Died: June 5, 1904 (aged 58); Florence, Kingdom of Italy
- Resting place: Woodlawn Cemetery
- Spouse: Mark Twain (m. 1870)
- Children: Langdon Clemens; Susy Clemens; Clara Clemens; Jean Clemens

Olivia Langdon Clemens (November 27, 1845 – June 5, 1904) was the wife of the American author Samuel Langhorne Clemens, better known under his pen name Mark Twain.

== Early life ==
Olivia Langdon was born in 1845 in Elmira, New York, to Jervis Langdon and Olivia Lewis Langdon. Her childhood home from 1847 to 1862 was the building at what is now 413 Lake Street. Jervis was a very wealthy coal businessman. The family was religious, reformist, and abolitionist. Olivia, called Livy, was educated by a combination of home tutoring and classes at Thurston's Female Seminary and Elmira Female College. Her health was poor. She was an invalid for part of her teenage years (about six years), and she suffered from what was probably tuberculosis myelitis or Pott's disease. She continued to have health problems throughout her life.

== Courtship and wedding ==
Langdon met Samuel Clemens in December 1867, through her brother Charles, whom he had met on a voyage to the Holy Land aboard the ship Quaker City, as recounted in the book 'The Innocents Abroad'. Clemens later claimed to have fallen in love at first sight with Olivia based solely on her photograph. On their first date they attended a reading by Charles Dickens, in New York City. Clemens, ten years older than Olivia, courted her throughout 1868, mainly by letter. She rejected his first proposal of marriage, but they became engaged two months later, in November 1868. Clemens was quoted later as saying: "I do believe that young filly has broken my heart. That only leaves me with one option, for her to mend it." The engagement was announced in February 1869, and in February 1870, they were married. The wedding was in Elmira, and the ceremony was performed by the Congregational ministers Joseph Twichell and Thomas K. Beecher.

== Life after wedding ==
Olivia and Samuel moved to Buffalo, New York, where they lived in a house purchased for them by Olivia's father, Jervis Langdon. Life was difficult for them at first. Jervis died of cancer in August, followed a month later by Olivia's friend Emma Nye, who died in the Clemens' home. Their first child, Langdon Clemens, was born in November but was premature. Olivia contracted typhoid fever and became very ill. The Clemens family then moved to Elmira, so that Olivia's family could watch over her and Langdon.

In 1871, the family moved again, to Hartford, Connecticut, where they rented a large house in the Nook Farm neighborhood and quickly became important members of the social and literary scene there. They were well off due to Samuel Clemens' earnings from his books and lectures, and Olivia's inheritance, and they lived lavishly. In 1874, they moved into a distinctive house they had had built on land they had purchased; they lived there until 1891.

Langdon, their son, died in 1872, a year and a half after his birth. Three daughters were born: Olivia Susan (called "Susy") in 1872; Clara in 1874; and Jean (born "Jane") in 1880.

The family left for Europe in 1891 and lived there for four years. This was mainly prompted by financial need—Samuel's investments in a publishing company and the Paige Compositor lost money, and the family's expenses were catching up with them. They permanently closed up the Hartford house and spent the four years in various temporary accommodations. In 1894, Samuel was forced to declare bankruptcy. Olivia was given "preferred creditor" status, and all Samuel's copyrights were assigned to her. These measures saved the family's financial future.

Olivia helped her husband with the editing of his books, articles, and lectures. She was a "faithful, judicious, and painstaking editor", Clemens wrote. This was one of the things that Livy had on her list of things to do, and she prided herself in helping her husband to edit these works. However, she could be critical of him at times. She continued to help her husband to edit works up until a few months before her death.

Olivia was also a proponent of women's rights, and surrounded herself with influential women including Julia Beecher and Isabella Beecher Hooker.

In 1895 and 1896, Olivia and her daughter, Clara, accompanied Samuel on his around-the-world lecture tour, which he undertook to pay off his debts. In 1896, their daughter Susy, who had remained at home in the US, died of spinal meningitis at age 24, a crushing blow to both Olivia and her husband. The family lived in Switzerland, Austria, and England until 1902. Other places the Clemenses lived included Sweden, Germany, France, and Italy. They then returned to the United States, lived in Riverdale, New York, and arranged to move into a house in Tarrytown, New York. Olivia's health began worsening and, advised to keep a distance from her husband in order to keep from getting overexcited, went months without seeing him. However, Samuel frequently broke the rule and secretly saw her in order to exchange love letters and kisses. By the end of 1903, doctors' advice led the Clemens family to move to Italy for the warm climate where they resided in a rented villa outside of Florence.

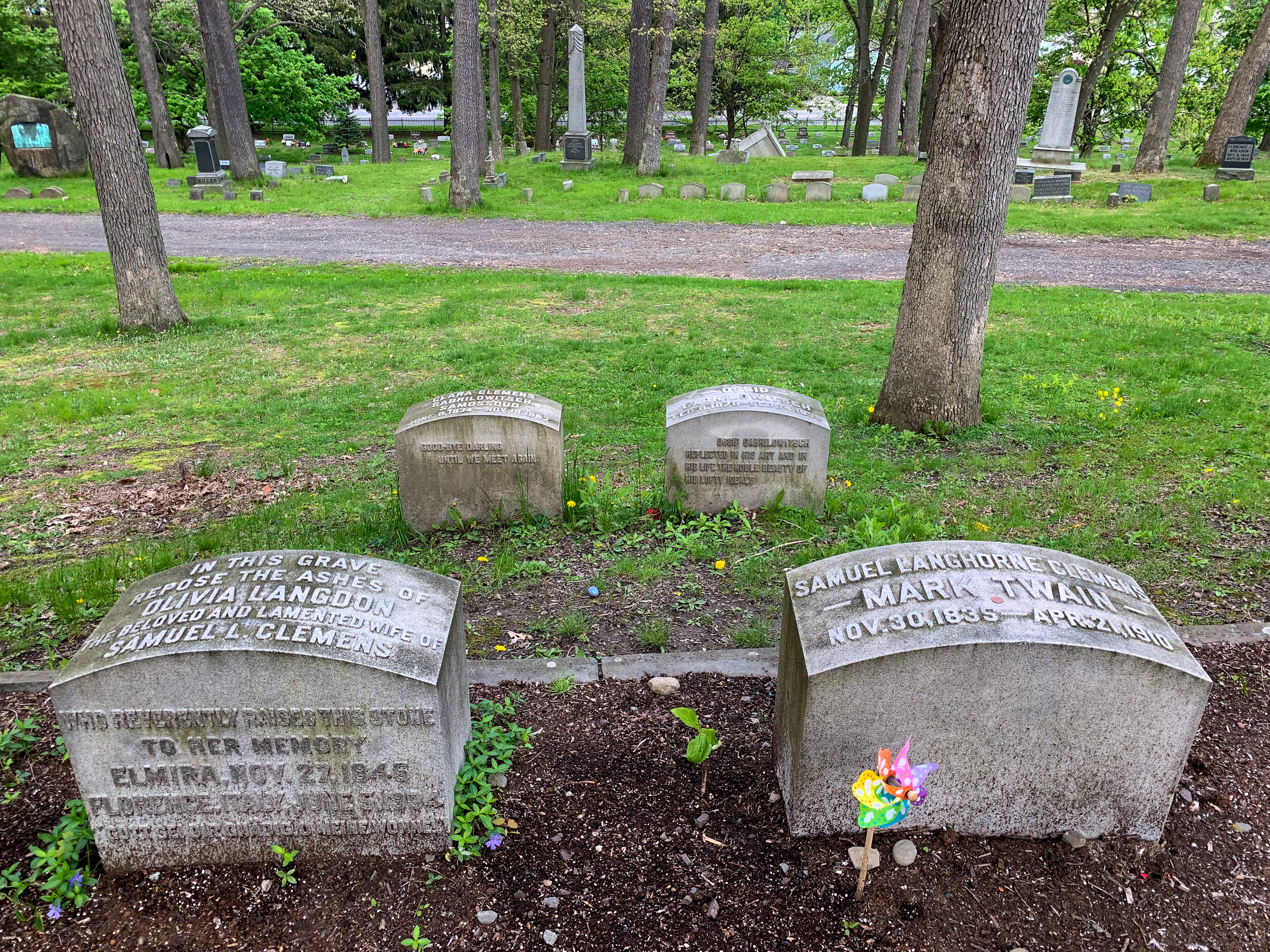
Graves of Olivia Langdon Clemens and Mark Twain.

Scarcely six months later, however, on June 5, 1904, Olivia died in Florence from heart failure. She was cremated, and her ashes were interred at Woodlawn Cemetery in Elmira. Samuel, who was devastated by her death, died in 1910; he is interred beside her.

== Legacy ==
Mrs. Clemens was one of the founders of the Hartford Art School which later became part of the University of Hartford.

A bronze statue of Mrs. Clemens stands on the campus of Elmira College. The 600-pound (270 kg) statue, by Gary Weisman of Newfield, New York, was a gift of the Class of 2008.

A fictionalized version of Olivia appears in The Fabulous Riverboat, the second book in the Philip José Farmer Riverworld series.
