= Lyman Beecher =

American Presbyterian minister (1775–1863)

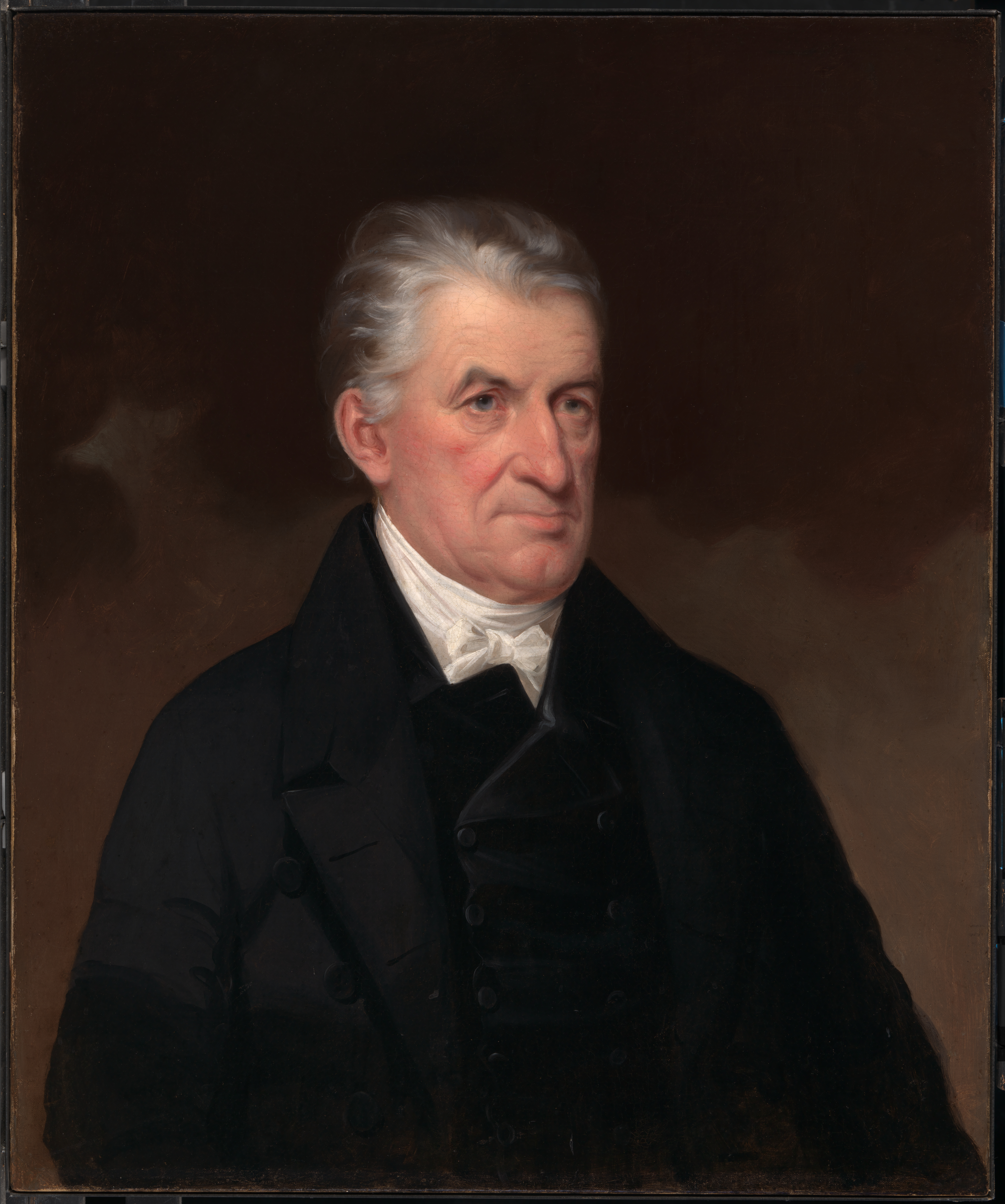
- Painting c. 1842
- Born: October 12, 1775; New Haven, Connecticut Colony
- Died: January 10, 1863 (aged 87); Brooklyn, New York, US
- Occupation: Minister
- Spouses: Roxana Foote (m. 1799; died 1816) Harriet Porter (m. 1817; died 1835) Lydia Beals (m. 1836)
- Children: 13, including Catharine, William, Edward, Harriet, Henry, Charles, Isabella, Thomas, James
- Family: Beecher

Lyman Beecher (October 12, 1775 – January 10, 1863) was an American Presbyterian minister and abolitionist. He fathered 13 children, over half of whom became writers or ministers, including Harriet Beecher Stowe, Henry Ward Beecher, Charles Beecher, Edward Beecher, Isabella Beecher Hooker, Catharine Beecher, and Thomas K. Beecher.

According to his son Henry, Beecher was "largely engaged during his life-time in controversy". However, "he was also the most respected religious voice of his era. ...[H]e seemed also to embody all of the nation's moral ideals, in representing the established clergy, who looked to him for leadership."

== Early life ==
Beecher was born in New Haven, Connecticut, to David Beecher, a blacksmith, and Esther Hawley Lyman. His mother died shortly after his birth, and he was committed to the care of his uncle Lot Benton, by whom he was adopted as a son, and with whom his early life was spent blacksmithing and farming. But it was soon found that he preferred study. He was fitted for college by the Rev. Thomas W. Bray, and at the age of eighteen entered Yale College, graduating in 1797. He spent much of 1798 at Yale under the tutelage of his mentor Timothy Dwight.

== Ministry ==
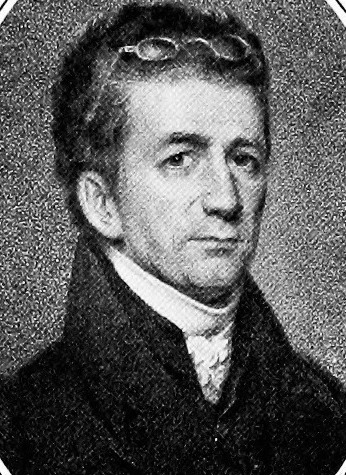
Lyman Beecher

=== Ministry on Long Island in New York (1798–1810) ===
In September 1798, he was licensed to preach by the New Haven West Association, and entered upon his clerical duties by supplying the pulpit in the Presbyterian church at East Hampton, Long Island, and was ordained in 1799. Here he married his first wife, Roxana Foote. His salary was $300 a year plus firewood, after five years increased to $400 (equivalent to $9,000 in 2025), with a dilapidated parsonage. To eke out his scanty income, his wife opened a private school, in which he was an instructor. Following Aaron Burr and Alexander Hamilton's 1804 duel, Beecher gained popular recognition when he gave a sermon before the Presbytery of Long Island which was promptly published as The Remedy for Duelling in 1806.

=== Ministry in Litchfield, Connecticut (1810–1826) ===
Finding his salary wholly inadequate to support his growing family, he resigned the charge at East Hampton, and in 1810 moved to Litchfield, Connecticut, where he was minister for 16 years at First Congregational Church of Litchfield, the town's Congregational church. There he started to preach Calvinism. He purchased the home built by Elijah Wadsworth and reared a large family.

==== Temperance ====
Alcohol intoxication or drunkenness, known as intemperance at the time, was a source of concern in New England as well as in other areas of the United States. Heavy drinking occurred even at some formal meetings of clergy, and Beecher resolved to take a stand against it. In 1826 he delivered and published “Six Sermons on Intemperance”. They were sent throughout the United States, ran rapidly through many editions in England, and were translated into several languages in Europe, enjoying large sales even 50 years later.

==== Unitarian crisis and women's education ====
During Beecher's residence in Litchfield, the Unitarian controversy arose, and he took a prominent part. Litchfield was at this time the seat of the famous Litchfield Law School (1784–1833) and several other institutions of learning, and Beecher (now a doctor of divinity) and his wife undertook to supervise the training of several young women, who were received into their family. But here, too, he found his annual salary of $800 inadequate.

=== Ministry in Boston (1826–1832) ===
The rapid and extensive defection of the Congregational churches in Boston and vicinity, under the lead of William Ellery Channing and others in sympathy with him, had excited much anxiety throughout New England. In 1826 Beecher was called to Boston's Hanover Church, where he began preaching against the Unitarianism which was then sweeping the area.

=== Leadership of Lane Seminary in Cincinnati (1832–1852) ===
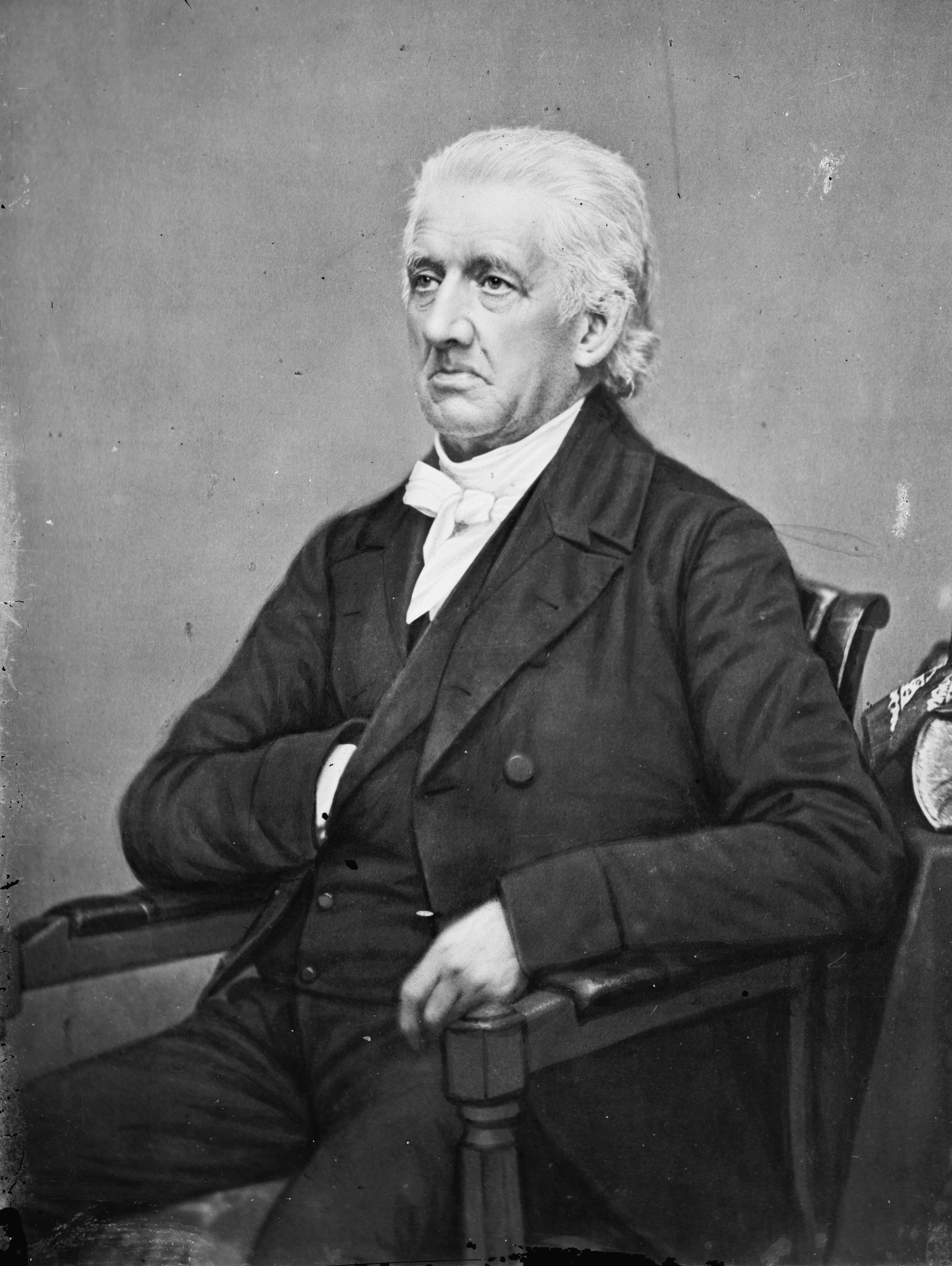
Photograph by Mathew Brady

The religious public had become impressed with the growing importance of the great West; a theological seminary had been founded at Walnut Hills, near Cincinnati, Ohio, and named Lane Seminary, after one of its principal benefactors. Beecher's Hanover Street Church was severely damaged by fire in 1830, and the Board of Lane Seminary, hoping this might dispose him to a move, later that year offered him the presidency, with a salary of $20,000 (equivalent to $1,209,000 in 2025), but he turned it down. He accepted a second offer, in 1832. His mission there was to train ministers to win the West for Protestantism. Along with his presidency, he was also professor of sacred theology, and pastor of the Second Presbyterian Church of Cincinnati (later merged with First Presbyterian into modern-day Covenant First Presbyterian Church). He served as a pastor for the first ten years of his Lane presidency.

Beecher was also notorious for his anti-Catholicism, and soon after his arrival in Cincinnati authored the nativist tract "A Plea for the West". His sermon on this subject at Boston in 1834 was followed shortly by the burning of the Catholic Ursuline Sisters' convent there. Catholics blamed Lyman, and charged that the arsonists had been "goaded on by Dr. Lyman Beecher", but Lyman insisted that the sermon "to which the mob ascribed" was preached before his presence in Boston was generally known, and on the very evening of the riot, some miles distant from the scene, and that probably not one of the rioters had heard it or even "knew of its delivery". Nevertheless, the convent was burned, and just at the season when Lyman was alerting Massachusetts to danger from the "despotic character and hostile designs of popery".

Authors disagree as to whether Lyman Beecher's three anti-catholic speeches triggered the burning. For example, Ira Leonard, author of American Nativism, 1830-1860, notes that the three anti-catholic speeches "by Lyman Beecher" ultimately "ignited the spark["]. This statement implies that some of the individuals involved in the burning attended one of Beecher's three sermons. Conversely, Ray Billington understands the two events to be more coincidental. Billington notes that, although the convent burned the evening of Beecher's sermons, the group of working-class men who organized the burning met on three separate occasions, two of which [preceded] Beecher's sermons. Furthermore, Beecher spoke at upper-class churches which the workers would not have attended. "In all probability," Billington comments, "the [convent] would have been attacked whether or not these sermons were delivered."

==== Lane debates ====
Beecher's term at Lane came at a time when slavery became an even larger issue, threatening to divide the Presbyterian Church, the state of Ohio, and the nation.

Like most important men of the 1820s, Beecher was a colonizationist, one who supported the American Colonization Society's program of helping free Blacks emigrate to West Africa and set up there a black colony. He is reported to have reacted positively to an announcement of the planned debates on that topic at Lane. However, a June 4, 1834, meeting of the Cincinnati Colonization Society "was addressed at length, by the Rev. Dr. Beecher, president of the Lane Seminary, who defended the society in an able manner, against some of the many charges brought against it, and endeavored to show the friends of abolition, that they might and ought to act in concert with the Colonization Society." He is quoted again as participating in a meeting of the same body on October 31, 1834.

But against a background of the Haitian Revolution, the French Revolution of 1830, the agitation in England for reform and against colonial slavery, and the punishment by American courts of citizens like Reuben Crandall who had dared to attack the slave trade carried on under the American flag, news about the brutal treatment of American slaves began to be heard. John Rankin's Letters on Slavery had begun to direct the attention of Americans to the evils of slavery, and a new organization, the American Anti-Slavery Society, held its initial meeting in Philadelphia in 1833. Its president, Arthur Tappan, through whose generous donations Beecher had been induced to head the new Lane Seminary, forwarded to the students a copy of the address issued by the convention, and the whole subject was soon under discussion.

In February 1834, students at Lane, with national publicity, for 18 consecutive nights debated the colonization issue: whether the American Colonization Society, which sought to settle freed slaves in Africa, was worthy of support. The students did not have permission for the debate, but they were not stopped ahead of time. Most of them abandoned colonization as a hoax, replacing it with abolitionism. It was seen as a hoax because firstly it was logistically impossible to relocate more than a handful of freed slaves, and secondly according to Gerrit Smith, the colonization movement aimed to make slavery more defensible, not end it.

Many of the students were from the South, and an effort was made to stop the discussions and the meetings. Slaveholders from Kentucky came in and incited mob violence, and for several weeks Beecher lived in a turmoil, not knowing whether rioters might destroy the seminary and the houses of the professors. The Board of Trustees interfered during the absence of Beecher, and allayed the excitement of the mob by forbidding all further discussion of slavery in the seminary, even at meals, whereupon the students withdrew en masse. The group of about 50 students (who became known as the Lane Rebels) who left the seminary went to the new Oberlin Collegiate Institute, leaving Lane almost without students. Beecher believed himself blameless.

The well-reported events contributed significantly to the growth and spread of abolitionism in the northern United States. Beecher was neither aware of nor interested in Lane's key role in publicizing abolitionism.

==== Heresy trial over New School sympathies ====
Although earlier in his career he had opposed them, Beecher stoked controversy by advocating "new measures" of evangelism (including revivals and camp meetings) that ran counter to traditional Calvinist understanding. These new measures at the time of the Second Great Awakening brought turmoil to churches all across America. Joshua Lacy Wilson, pastor of First Presbyterian (later merged with Second Presbyterian into modern-day Covenant First Presbyterian) charged Beecher with heresy in 1835.

The trial took place in his own church, and Beecher defended himself, while burdened with the cares of his seminary, his church, and his wife at home on her deathbed. The trial resulted in acquittal, and, on an appeal to the general synod, he was again acquitted, but the controversy engendered by the action went on until the Presbyterian church was divided in two. Beecher took an active part in the theological controversies that led to the excision of a portion of the general assembly of the Presbyterian church in 1837-38, Beecher adhering to the New School Presbyterian branch of the schism.

=== Move from Cincinnati to New York City (1852–death in 1863) ===
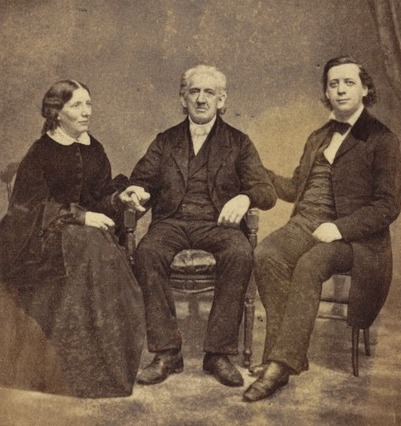
Beecher with his children Harriet Beecher Stowe and Henry Ward Beecher, taken sometime after 1858.

After the slavery controversy, Beecher and his co-professor Calvin Ellis Stowe remained and tried to revive the prosperity of the seminary, but at last abandoned it. The great project of their lives was defeated, and they returned to the East, where Beecher went to live with his son Henry in Brooklyn, New York, in 1852. He wished to devote himself mainly to the revision and publication of his works. But his intellectual powers began to decline, while his physical strength was unabated. About his 80th year he suffered a stroke of paralysis, and thenceforth his mental powers only gleamed out occasionally. After spending the last years of his life with his children, he died in Brooklyn in 1863 and was buried at Grove Street Cemetery, in New Haven, Connecticut.

== Legacy ==
Beecher was proverbially absent-minded, and after having been wrought up by the excitement of preaching was accustomed to relax his mind by playing "Auld Lang Syne" on the violin, or dancing the "double shuffle" in his parlor.

Lyman Beecher's house, on the former campus of the Lane Seminary in Cincinnati, Ohio, became the Harriet Beecher Stowe House. Harriet, his daughter, lived here until her marriage. It is the only Lane building still standing. It is open to the public and operates as an historical and cultural site, focusing on Harriet Beecher Stowe, the Lane Seminary, and the Underground Railroad. The site also documents African-American history. The Harriet Beecher Stowe House is located at 2950 Gilbert Avenue, in Cincinnati, Ohio.

== Personal life ==
In 1799, Beecher married Roxana Foote, the daughter of Eli and Roxana (Ward) Foote. They had nine children: Catharine Esther, William Henry, Edward, Mary, Harriet (1808–1808), George, Harriet Elisabeth, Henry Ward, and Charles. Roxana died on September 13, 1816. The following year, he married Harriet Porter and fathered four more children: Frederick C., Isabella Holmes, Thomas Kinnicut, and James Chaplin. Of the thirteen Beecher children, nine went on to become writers. Harriet Porter Beecher died on July 7, 1835. On September 23, 1836, he married Samuel Beals' daughter Lydia Beals (September 17, 1789 – 1869), who had previously been married to Joseph Jackson (1779/10 – December 1833). Lydia and Beecher had no children.

== Works ==
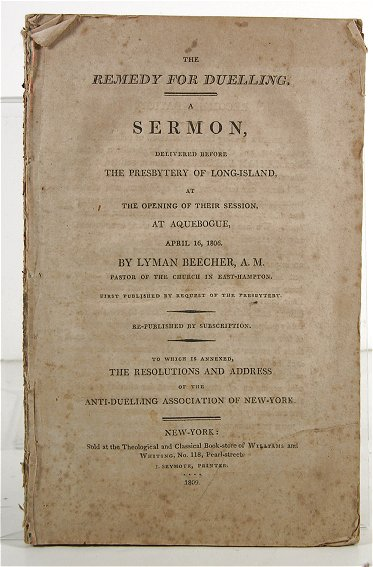
Cover of "The Remedy for Dueling", a pamphlet with the text of his 1806 sermon

Beecher was the author of a great number of printed sermons and addresses. His published works are:

- Beecher, Lyman (1806). A sermon, occasioned by the lamented death of Mrs. Frances M. Sands, of New-Shoreham, formerly an inhabitant of East-Hampton, (L.I.), composed and now made public at the request of her afflicted partner, and delivered at East-Hampton October 12th, 1806. Sag Harbor, New York.
- Beecher, Lyman (1809). The Remedy for Duelling. A sermon, delivered before the Presbytery of Long-Island, at the opening of their session, at Aquebogue, April 16, 1806. New York.
- Beecher, Lyman (1819). The Design, Rights, and Duties of Local Churches: A Sermon Delivered at the installation of the Rev. Elias Cornelius as associate pastor of the Tabernacle Church in Salem, July 21, 1819. Andover, Massachusetts.
- Beecher, Lyman; Garrettson, Freeborn (1820). Address of the Charitable Society for the Education of Indigent Pious Young Men, for the Ministry of the Gospel : published by Rev. Lyman Beecher, chairman of their committee of supplies. And now re-published with Rev. Mr. Garretson's letter, and some additional notes, by another hand. Concord, New Hampshire. ISBN 9780608436739. OCLC 191281079.
- Beecher, Lyman (1827). Six Sermons on the Nature, Occasions, Signs, Evils, and Remedy of Intemperance. Boston.
- Beecher, Lyman; Nettleton, Asahel (1828). Letters of the Rev. Dr. Beecher and Rev. Mr. Nettleton, on the "New measures" in conducting revivals of religion : with a review of a sermon, by Novanglus. New York: G. & C. Carvill.
- Beecher, Lyman (1828). Sermons Delivered on Various Occasions. Boston.
- Beecher, Lyman (1829). The Gospel according to Paul. A sermon, delivered Sept. 17, 1828, at the installation of the Rev. Bennet Tyler, D.D., as pastor of the Second Congregational Church in Portland, Maine. Boston.
- Beecher, Lyman (1835). Lectures on Skepticism, delivered in Park Street Church, Boston, and in the Second Presbyterian Church, Cincinnati (3rd ed.). Cincinnati: Corey and Webster.
- Beecher, Lyman (1835). A Plea for the West. Cincinnati: Truman and Smith.
- Beecher, Lyman (1836). A Plea for Colleges (2nd ed.). Cincinnati and New York: Truman and Smith (Cincinnati); Leavitt, Lord and Co. (New York).
- Beecher, Lyman (1852). Lectures on Political Atheism and Kindred Subjects: Together with Six Lectures on temperance. Dedicated to the working men of the United States. Beecher's Works, vol. I. Boston: John P. Jewett & Company.
- Beecher, Lyman (1852). Sermons Delivered on Various Occasions. Beecher's Works, vol. II. Boston: John P. Jewett & Company.
- Beecher, Lyman (1853). Views of Theology : as developed in three sermons : and on his trials before the Presbytery and Synod of Cincinnati, June, 1835 : with remarks on the Princeton review. Beecher's Works, vol. III. Boston: J.P. Jewett.
- Beecher, Lyman (1853). Atheism Considered Theologically and Politically: In a Series of Lectures. London.
- Beecher, Lyman (1864). Beecher, Charles (ed.). Autobiography, Correspondence, Etc., of Lyman Beecher, D.D. Vol. 1. New York: Harper & Brothers.
- Beecher, Lyman (1865). Beecher, Charles (ed.). Autobiography, Correspondence, Etc., of Lyman Beecher, D.D. Vol. 2. New York: Harper & Brothers.

He made a collection of those of his works which he deemed the most valuable (3 vols., Boston, 1852).
