= Charles Beecher =

United States clergyman and writer (1815–1900)

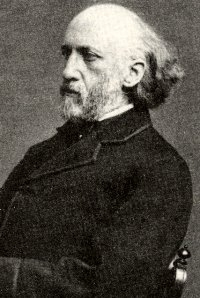
- Charles Beecher
- Born: October 1, 1815; Litchfield, Connecticut
- Died: April 21, 1900 (aged 84); Georgetown, Massachusetts
- Education: Boston Latin School; Lawrence Academy
- Occupations: Minister, composer of religious hymns and author
- Spouse: Sarah Leland Coffin (m. 1840; died 1897)
- Children: 6
- Parent(s): Lyman Beecher; Roxana Foote Beecher
- Relatives: Harriet Beecher Stowe (sister); Henry Ward Beecher (brother); Catharine Beecher (sister); James Chaplin Beecher (brother)

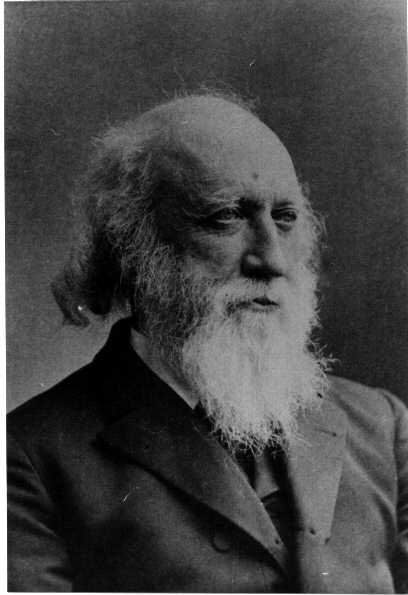
An older Charles Beecher

Charles Beecher (October 1, 1815 – April 21, 1900) was an American minister, composer of religious hymns and a prolific author.

== Early life ==
Beecher was born in Litchfield, Connecticut, the fifth child of Lyman Beecher, an abolitionist Congregationalist preacher from Boston and Roxana Foote Beecher. He was the brother of Harriet Beecher Stowe, the famous author of Uncle Tom's Cabin, and the brother of renowned Congregationalist minister, Henry Ward Beecher. He also had another prominent and activist sister, Catharine Beecher.

He attended Boston Latin School and Lawrence Academy in Groton, Massachusetts, graduated from Bowdoin College in 1834, and then attended Lane Theological Seminary in Ohio. He taught music classes in Cincinnati, Ohio, and received his preaching license from the Presbytery of Indianapolis, Indiana. He served as pastor of the Second Presbyterian Church in Fort Wayne, Indiana, from 1844 until 1851. He was also a prominent member of the Peucinian Society.

== Career ==
In 1851, he moved east and ministered to the First Free Presbyterian Church in Newark, New Jersey. The church, known as a stronghold of abolitionism, was expelled from the Presbyterian Synod in 1853, and re-organized as a Congregationalist church. Beecher left in 1857 for a pastorate in Georgetown, Massachusetts.

In 1863 he was relieved of his preaching duties in the Congregational Church for preaching against orthodox doctrine. Specifically, he was convicted of teaching contrary to Scriptural articles of faith in promoting the errors of the preexistence and apostasy of human souls, the offer of salvation to the unrepentant after their deaths, that Jesus was an angel combined with the divinity of the Second Person of the Trinity and a human body, that Jesus' sufferings were not vicariously atoning but only morally persuasive, and that God was not impassible but had changeable passions.

Following the Civil War, he moved to Florida to help his sister Harriet and her husband minister to newly freed slaves. He eventually was state Superintendent of Public Instruction in Florida from 1871 to 1873. He finished his ministry as acting pastor in Wysox, Pennsylvania, from 1885 to 1893.

=== Musical interests ===
He also published two music texts and was one of the music editors for his brother Henry's 1855 Plymouth Collection. He published several antislavery tracts, including A Sermon on the Nebraska Bill (1854) and The God of the Bible Against Slavery (1855).

== Personal life ==
In 1840, Beecher married Sarah Leland Coffin (1815–1897), a daughter of Nathaniel Coffin and Mary King (née Porter) Coffin. Her maternal grandfather was William King, the first governor of Maine and a half-brother of U.S. Senator and Minister to the United Kingdom Rufus King. Together, they had six children, including:

- Frederick Henry Beecher (1841–1868), died at the Battle of Beecher Island during the Comanche War. The island was posthumously named after him.
- Charles McCulloch Beecher (1843–1906), who married Anna Melinda Clary Johnson (1849–1911), the aunt of Robert Livingston Johnson.
- Helen Louisa Beecher (1847–1901)
- Mary Isabella Beecher (1849–1928), who married George Warren Noyes (1842–1927).
- Esther "Essie" Lyman Beecher (1852–1867), who died young.
- Edith Harriet Beecher (1854–1867), who died young.

Beecher died in Georgetown, Massachusetts on April 21, 1900.

== Published works ==
Beecher's major publications include:

- The Incarnation, or, Pictures of the Virgin and her Son (1849)
- The Duty of Disobedience to Wicked Laws (1851)
- David and his Throne (1855)
- Pen Pictures of the Bible (1855)
- The Life of David King of Israel (1861)
- Autobiography, Correspondence, etc. of Lyman Beecher (1863)
- Redeemer and Redeemed (1864)
- Spiritual Manifestations (1879)
- The Eden Tableau, or, Object Bible-Teaching (1880)
- Patmos; or, the Unveiling (1896)
