= Harriet Beecher Stowe House =

Harriet Beecher Stowe House may refer to:

- Harriet Beecher Stowe House (Hartford, Connecticut), listed on the National Register of Historic Places (NRHP)
- Harriet Beecher Stowe House (Brunswick, Maine), NRHP-listed
- Harriet Beecher Stowe House (Cincinnati, Ohio), NRHP-listed

== See also ==
- Harriet Beecher Stowe
- Mandarin, Florida
