= Alpha Delta Phi Society =

American gender-inclusive college group

- ΑΔΦ
- Coat of Arms of Alpha Delta Phi Society
- Founded: 1992; 34 years ago Brainerd, Minnesota
- Type: Literary and social
- Affiliation: Independent
- Status: Active
- Scope: National
- Motto: Manus Multæ Cor Unum "Many Hands, One Heart"
- Colors: Emerald and Pearl
- Symbol: Star, crescent, sword, spear, escutcheon
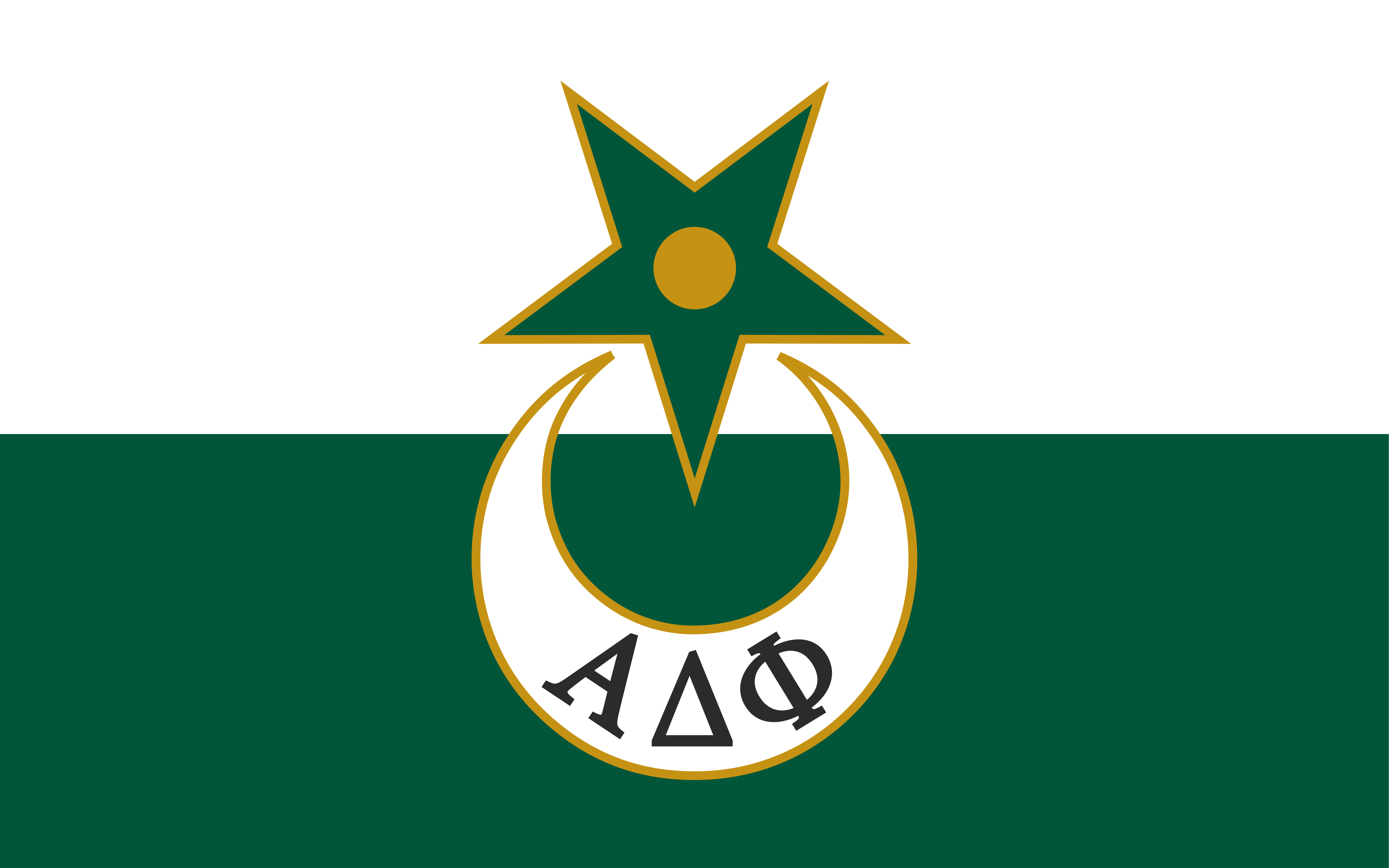
- Flag
- Flower: Lily of the valley
- Publication: ΑΔΦ Society Newsletter; Echoes From on High; Society XAIPE
- Chapters: 10
- Colonies: 3
- Members: 1,200 lifetime
- Nickname: The Society, Adelphi Society
- Headquarters: 2242 N. Baldwin Way #5B; Palatine, Illinois 60074; United States
- Website: www.adps.org

Alpha Delta Phi Society (ΑΔΦ) also known as The Society or Adelphi Society, is a United States Greek-letter literary and social society that is gender-inclusive. The society formed in 1992 when four chapters withdrew from the all-male Alpha Delta Phi Fraternity. Legally, the two groups are separate entities with different ideologies but continue to share traditions.

== History ==
=== Alpha Delta Phi ===
Samuel Eells and four others founded the literary society Alpha Delta Phi at Hamilton College in 1832. The fraternity quickly expanded to other colleges across the United States and in Canada.

=== Coed debate ===
In 1968, the California chapter at the University of California, Berkeley began admitting women in violation of the fraternity's constitution. Soon, the Chicago chapter at Northwestern University also started admitting females. At the Alpha Delta Phi national convention in 1972, the California chapter proposed an amendment to the constitution, eliminating the all-male restriction and allowing women to become full members. The debate was contentious, with most chapters opposed to the change. As a result, the proposed amendment was tabled.

Brother Robert Price was tasked with finding a solution to the conflict. More Alpha Delta Phi chapters became coed, including the Brunonian chapter at Brown University and the Middletown chapter at Wesleyan University in 1973. That same year, Price came up with the Brown Compromise that allowed women to join as "local" members but not as national fraternity initiates.

The Bowdoin chapter at Bowdoin College went coed in 1976, followed by the Columbia chapter at Columbia University and the Amherst chapter at Amherst College. However, the California and Chicago chapters returned to male-only status.

In March 1975, the Brunonian chapter elected the first female president in the fraternity's history. This resulted in media coverage and hostility from the fraternity and its alumni. Alpha Delta Phi sent a letter stating its plans to suspend the Brunonian chapter at the next national meeting. In 1978, the coed chapters held a Co-Ed Caucus in Middletown to develop strategies. They developed the home rule policy and introduced it at the 1978 national conference. However, the proposed home rule policy was defeated; it would have given each chapter the right to decide whether or not to initiate women fully.

At the 1981 convention, the Trinity Compromise was adopted, allowing those "non-constitutionally qualified for membership" to be inducted as full members of a chapter and participate in the initiation ceremony as long as they did not hold an elected office or vote on new members. Although women could now be full members of individual chapters, they could only be associate members of the national fraternity. The coed chapters immediately began circumventing the resolution, allowing women to serve as officers by creating new offices or submitting male names to the national fraternity. Some chapters submitted female entries to the fraternity's literary contest under male members' names.

In 1985, female members from the Middletown chapter were denied entry to a business session at the national convention. Not only were the women not allowed to stay for the business meeting, but there was also pushing and shoving when they tried to participate in ceremonies at the annual banquet. The next year at the annual convention, the Washington chapter and the Berkeley chapter presented a resolution to revoke the charter of any chapter that initiated women after August 1990.

In 1988, half of the Middletown chapter members were female. By the next year, the option of splitting Alpha Delta Phi had supporters. In 1989, the Brunonian chapter passed a resolution to cut ties with the national fraternity if it did not stop its discrimination against women by the fall of 1990. In November, the Stanford University chapter became the first fraternity on its campus to go coed, initiating fifteen women.

At the 1990 national convention, the adoption of the Berkeley-Washington resolution was delayed in favor of a new proposal to create two separate, but connected, organizations. According to this proposal, Alpha Delta Phi would remain an all-male fraternity and the new Alpha Delta Phi Society would consist of the coed chapters and any interested all-male chapters. This proposal convinced the Brunonian chapter to delay its disassociation by another year.

In 1991, the Bowdoin chapter offered its local female members full fraternity status to comply with the college's new equality guidelines. Although the chapter had been coed for fifteen years, its compliance with the college's guidelines put it at odds with the national fraternity that had yet to create an official solution for its coed chapters.

=== The Society ===
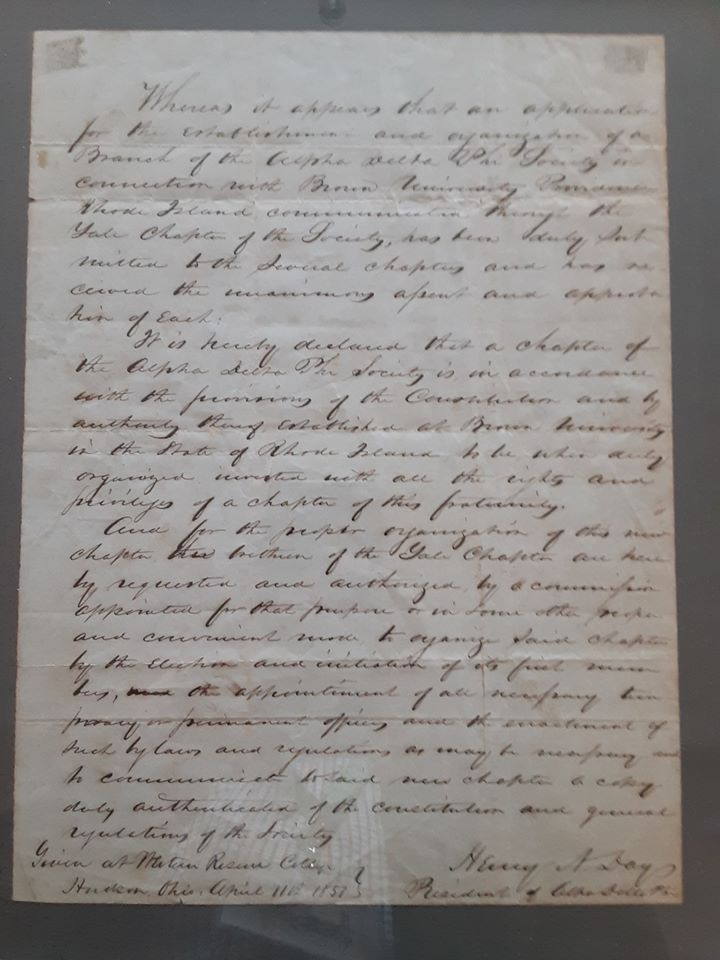
Letter approving the refounding of the Brunonian Chapter in 1851 held at the John D. Rockefeller Library of Brown University.

In August 1992, at the fraternity's annual convention in Brainerd, Minnesota, the "Agreement Between the Alpha Delta Phi Fraternity and the Alpha Delta Phi Society" was ratified. Under this agreement, the fraternity and the society separated and became independent, legal entities with their own governing bodies. The two organizations would not share membership, except for male members of the society chapters who joined the fraternity before 1992. The groups would share the license for the Greek letters ΑΔΦ and intellectual property, including history and songs. The agreement also limited where new chapters could be established and the society's use of the name Alpha Delta Phi. As a result, some chapters could not use the society name, instead operating as the Adelphi Society.

With the agreement's adoption, the Brown, Columbia, Stanford, and Wesleyan chapters withdrew from the fraternity. These four chapters established the Alpha Delta Phi Society that granted each chapter home rule to determine its gender makeup. The Bowdoin chapter joined the society's first convention in 1993. The society adopted a constitution in October 1997 at its annual convention, ratifying it in 1998. Its first affiliate was formed in 1994 at Middlebury College. Between 2008 and 2015, affiliate chapters and chapters opened at Harvard University, the University of New Hampshire, the University of Pennsylvania, Binghamton University, George Washington University, Rensselaer Polytechnic Institute, and Ursinus College.

In August 2017, at the Alpha Delta Phi fraternity's annual convention in Minneapolis, Minnesota, the fraternity and the society replaced the 1992 agreement. The new agreement brought greater parity and removed geographic restrictions on the use of the name Alpha Delta Phi Society. The language of the agreement was also simplified.

In August 2023, the Lambda Phi chapter at Massachusetts Institute of Technology announced that they would go co-ed and begin recruiting and initiating new members of all genders, effective immediately. The Alpha Delta Phi Fraternity Board of Governors responded by promptly revoking Lambda Phi's charter. Within days, the Alpha Delta Phi Society Board of Governors announced that the Lambda Phi chapter had been granted affiliate chapter status with the society. Lambda Phi was accepted as a fully chartered chapter at the Alpha Delta Phi Society annual convention in March 2024. This was the first time since the formation and establishment of the society that an active Alpha Delta Phi Fraternity chapter voluntarily became gender-inclusive and transitioned to a society chapter.

== Symbols ==
The society continues to use the badge and crest of the Alpha Delta Phi fraternity. Its motto is Manus Multæ Cor Unum or "Many Hands, One Heart". Its colors are emerald and pearl. Its flower is the Lily of the valley.

== Chapters ==
The Alpha Delta Phi Society has seven active chapters, three graduate chapters, and three affiliate chapters. All chapters are gender-inclusive. In the following list, active chapters are noted in bold and inactive chapters are noted in italics.

Chapter	Charter date and range as ΑΔΦ fraternity	Charter date and range as ΑΔΦ Society	Institution	Location	Status	Ref.
**Columbia**	1836–1840, 1881–1992	1992	Columbia University	New York City, New York	Active	(Note: Formed in 1836 as a chapter of Alpha Delta Phi fraternity. Became a founding member of the society in 1992.)
**Brunonian**	1836–1838, 1851–1992	1992	Brown University	Providence, Rhode Island	Active	(Note: Formed in 1836 as a chapter of Alpha Delta Phi fraternity. Became a founding member of the society in 1992.)
**Middletown**	1856–1992	1992	Wesleyan University	Middletown, Connecticut	Active	(Note: Formed in 1856 as a chapter of Alpha Delta Phi fraternity. Became a founding member of the society in 1992.)
Stanford	1916–1992	1992–2018	Stanford University	Palo Alto, California	Inactive	(Note: Formed in 1911 as a chapter of Alpha Delta Phi fraternity. Became a founding member of the society in 1992.)
**Stanford Graduate**		1992	Stanford University	Palo Alto, California	Active	
Bowdoin	1841–1972, 1976–1992	1993–2000	Bowdoin College	Brunswick, Maine	Inactive	(Note: Formed in 1841 as a chapter of Alpha Delta Phi fraternity. The chapter transferred to the society in 1993.) (Note: 1999-20 was the last year fraternities were allowed at Bowdoin. As a result, the chapter changed to a graduate chapter.)
**Bowdoin Graduate**		2000	Bowdoin College	Brunswick, Maine	Active	
Middlebury		1995–2005	Middlebury College	Middlebury, Vermont	Inactive	(Note: Started as an affiliate chapter in 1994.)
Granite		2007–2014	University of New Hampshire	Durham, New Hampshire	Inactive	
**Granite Graduate**		2007	University of New Hampshire	Durham, New Hampshire	Active	
Harvard Affiliate		2008–20xx ?	Harvard University	Cambridge, Massachusetts	Inactive	(Note: Inactive by 2013)
**Binghamton**		2011	Binghamton University	Vestal, New York	Active	
Vermont Affiliate		20xx ?–2013	University of Vermont	Burlington, Vermont	Inactive	
Plattsburgh Affiliate		2013–2018	State University of New York at Plattsburgh	Plattsburgh, New York	Inactive	
**Capital**		2014	George Washington University	Washington, D.C.	Active	(Note: This chapter was known as the Adelphi Society until 2018 because of the geographical restrictions of the 1992 fraternity-society agreement.)
**Rensselaer**		2015	Rensselaer Polytechnic Institute	Troy, New York	Active	
**Ursinian Affiliate**		2015	Ursinus College	Collegeville, Pennsylvania	Active	
**New Leaf Affiliate**		2019	Indiana State University	Terre Haute, Indiana	Active	
**Penn**		2019	University of Pennsylvania	Philadelphia, Pennsylvania	Active	(Note: Started as an affiliate chapter in 2010.)
**Penn Graduate**		2019	University of Pennsylvania	Philadelphia, Pennsylvania	Active	
**Flint Affiliate**		2022	Kettering University	Flint, Michigan	Active	
**Lambda Phi**	1976–2023	2023	Massachusetts Institute of Technology	Cambridge, Massachusetts	Active	

== Activities ==
As a literary society, members write, read, and discuss literature. It also publishes a literary magazine, Echoes From On High. Its members participate in undergraduate and graduate literary competitions, supported by the Samuel Eells Literary and Educational Foundation, a separate nonprofit corporation. The Bowdoin chapter also hosts the Alpha Delta Phi Visiting Writers Series. Other chapters have co-hosted the production of a play or co-sponsored the Queer/Art/Poetics Conference.

The chapters also hold social events, including open mic nights and band concerts. The society also participates in charitable activities, such as Blind Date With a Book or Book Fairs, which raise funds for various organizations, including Books Behind Bars and Seacoast Reads.

== Chapter houses ==
The Wesleyan University chapter house was designed by Charles A. Rich in 1906 in collegiate colonial revival style. The house is located at 185 High Street in Middletown, also the site of the chapter's 1884 house that was demolished in 1904. An addition was added to the rear of the building in 1925.

== Alumni organizations ==
The society has numerous regional graduate organizations.

Chapter	Location	Ref.
AD|DC	Washington, D.C. and the surrounding area	
ADPS–BARGO	San Francisco Bay Area	
ADPS–Chicago	Chicago greater metro area	
ADPS–NYC	New York City Greater area	
ADPS–NW	Pacific Northwest region	
New England RGO	Greater New England area	

== Notable members ==
Some alumni of the founding society chapters joined before the schism between fraternity and society; they are listed as notables for both organizations. This issue was deliberated as part of the separation agreement between the organizations, allowing both to claim the alumni from the earlier era.

- John Perry Barlow (Wesleyan University, 1969) – poet, essayist, lyricist for the Grateful Dead, co-founder of Electronic Frontier Foundation
- Arlo Bates (Bowdoin College, 1876) – novelist, poet
- Samuel Blatchford (Columbia University, 1837) – U.S. Supreme Court justice
- Charles S. Bradley (Brown University, 1838) – chief justice of the Rhode Island Supreme Court
- Joshua Chamberlain (Bowdoin College, 1852) – Governor of Maine; president of Bowdoin College
- John David Clifford Jr. (Bowdoin College, 1910) – district judge of the United States District Court for the District of Maine
- Buzzy Cohen (Columbia University, 2007) – Jeopardy! Tournament of Champions winner in 2017
- George Fisk Comfort (Bowdoin College, 1857) – art historian, founder of Metropolitan Museum of Art and Everson Museum of Art
- George William Curtis (Brown University, 1852) – writer, journalist, abolitionist, political editor of Harper's Weekly
- Thomas Ewing Jr. (Brown University, 1856) – general U.S. Army, congressman, chief justice Kansas Supreme Court
- William Russell Grace (Columbia University, 1900) – founder of W. R. Grace and Company
- Abram W. Harris (Wesleyan University, 1880) – president of Northwestern University and University of Maine
- Roger Howell Jr. (Bowdoin College, 1958) – president of Bowdoin College
- John Jay (Columbia University, 1836) – abolitionist, diplomat, lawyer
- Thomas Jenckes (Brown University, 1838) – congressman
- Elijah Kellogg (Bowdoin College, 1840) – author
- Pagan Kennedy (Wesleyan University, 1984) – author, pioneer of 1990s zine movement
- Otto Kerner Jr. (Brown University, 1930) – Governor of Illinois
- Goodwin Knight (Stanford University) – Governor of California
- George V. N. Lothrop (Brown University, 1838) – Michigan Attorney General
- Monica Louwerens (Wesleyan University, 1995) – actress and Miss America contestant
- Robert Ludlum (Wesleyan University, 1951) – novelist
- George Frederick Magoun (Bowdoin College, 1841) – president of Iowa College
- Thomas Merton (Columbia University, 1938) – Trappist monk, theologian
- Barry Mills (Bowdoin College, 1972) – president of Bowdoin College
- Marcus Morton (Bowdoin College, 1838) – chief justice of the Massachusetts Supreme Judicial Court
- David Packard (Stanford University, 1934) – founder of the Hewlett-Packard Computer Corporation
- Daniel Pearl (Stanford University, 1985) – journalist, The Wall Street Journal editor
- J. Meredith Read (Brown University, 1858) – U.S. Minister to Greece, Consul General to France and Algeria
- John D. Rockefeller Jr. (Brown University, 1897) – director, Standard Oil and U.S. Steel
- Michael S. Roth (Wesleyan University, 1978) – president of Wesleyan University
- George Washington Shonk (Wesleyan University, 1873) – U.S. House of Representatives
- Herbert B. Shonk (Wesleyan University, 1873) – New York State Assembly, attorney
- Watson G. Squire (Wesleyan University, 1859) – U.S. Senator, Ohio Attorney General
- Ben Stein (Columbia University, 1966) – actor and author
- Charles Wardell Stiles (Wesleyan University, 1886) – zoologist, parasitologist with U.S. Department of Agriculture
- George Templeton Strong (Columbia University, 1838) – prolific diarist

== See also ==
- Alpha Delta Phi fraternity
- List of Alpha Delta Phi chapters
- List of Alpha Delta Phi members
- List of social fraternities
