= Lorenzo Latham =

American newspaper editor and fraternity founder

- Born: Lorenzo L. Latham; February 10, 1812; Massachusetts, US
- Died: December 27, 1860 (aged 48); Jefferson, Louisiana, US
- Burial place: Natchez City Cemetery, Natchez, Mississippi
- Education: Hamilton College
- Occupations: Newspaper editor and publisher
- Known for: Founding Alpha Delta Phi

Lorenzo L. Latham (February 10, 1812 – December 27, 1860) was an American newspaper editor and publisher. He was a founder of Alpha Delta Phi fraternity.

== Early life ==
Latham was born in Massachusetts on February 10, 1812.

He attended Hamilton College in Clinton, New York. During his senior year, he became a founding member of the literary fraternity, Alpha Delta Phi, along with Samuel Eells, John Curtiss Underwood, Oliver Andrew Morse, and Henry Lemuel Storrs. Eells and Latham were in charge of drafting the fraternity's constitution and designing its badge.

Latham graduated from Hamilton College in 1832, as his class salutatorian.

== Career ==
Latham became a teacher in Natchez, Mississippi. He was an editor of The Creole in Charleston, South Carolina. As an editor, he advocated on behalf of the American Party of South Carolina.

In March 1851, Lathem and Henry E. Johnson started the Louisiana State Republican in Lafayette, Jefferson Parish. Lathem and Johnson co-edited and co-published the newspaper. Its political slant was toward the Whig Party.

In October 1851, Latham was an applicant for the position of superintendent of the New Orleans Schools. He was an associate editor of the Picayune in New Orleans from 1853 to 1860.

== Personal life ==
Latham married Mary Barfield of Natchez, Mississippi on May 11, 1841. They had two children, H. J. Latham and James Lathem.

On December 27, 1860, Latham died from pneumonia at his home in Jefferson, Louisiana at the age of 48. He was buried in the Natchez City Cemetery in Natchez.

== Legacy ==
Alpha Delta Phi expanded into an international social and literary fraternity with more than 53,000 members.
