= Harriet Beecher Stowe House (Brunswick, Maine) =

Historic house in Maine, United States

- U.S. National Register of Historic Places
- U.S. National Historic Landmark
- U.S. Historic district – Contributing property
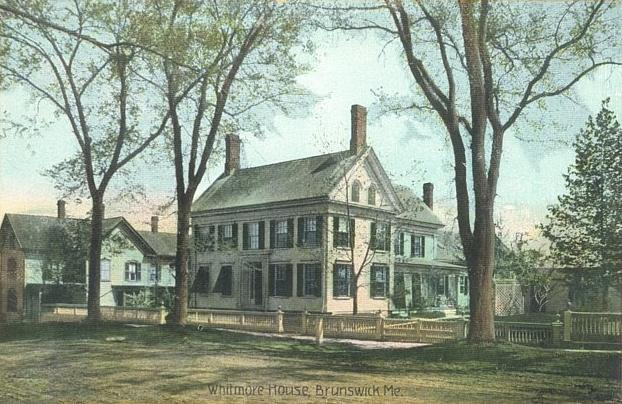

- Location within Maine Location within the United States
- Location: Brunswick, Maine
- Coordinates: 43°54′46″N 69°57′39″W
- Built: 1806
- Architectural style: Greek Revival
- Part of: Federal Street Historic District (ID76000092)
- NRHP reference No.: 66000091

Significant dates
- Added to NRHP: October 15, 1966
- Designated NHL: December 29, 1962
- Designated CP: October 29, 1976

The Harriet Beecher Stowe House is a historic home and National Historic Landmark at 63 Federal Street in Brunswick, Maine, notable as a short-term home of Harriet Beecher Stowe and Calvin Ellis Stowe and where Harriet wrote her 1852 novel Uncle Tom's Cabin. Earlier, it had been the home of Henry Wadsworth Longfellow as a student. It is today owned by Bowdoin College. A space within the house, called Harriet's Writing Room, is open to the public.

== History ==
The home was built 1806–1807 in the Federal style and was originally known as the Titcomb House. Henry Wadsworth Longfellow and his brother Stephen Longfellow temporarily rented rooms here while students at nearby Bowdoin College before moving into what is now the campus's Maine Hall by the fall of 1823.

When Calvin Ellis Stowe was hired as a professor by Bowdoin College in 1850, he and his family rented this home. His wife Harriet Beecher Stowe was sent ahead to prepare the housekeeping while he completed teaching the fall 1850 semester at Lane Theological Seminary in Cincinnati. Mrs. Stowe, six months pregnant at the time, set out in April 1850 with the couple's three oldest children and her aunt Esther. The family arrived in Brunswick on Wednesday, May 22, amid a storm. The house had already been partially prepared for them by Phebe Upham, the wife of Professor Thomas Cogswell Upham. As Mrs. Stowe wrote to her husband, Calvin Ellis Stowe a week later, "Mrs. Upham has done everything for me, giving up time and strength and taking charge of my affairs in a way without which we could not have got along at all in a strange place and in my present helpless condition." She missed her husband, however, and wrote to him in November, "I am lonesome nights in this rattletrap house where every wind shakes out as many noises as there are ghosts in Hades—screeching snapping cracking groaning."

Meanwhile, her husband in Ohio was ill. As Mrs. Stowe reported to her sister, he claimed he was sick "& all but dead" and worried what would happen to his wife if she were left a widow. "I read the letter and poke it into the stove, and proceed", she wrote. Their son Charley Stowe, the last of their children, was born in this house on July 8, 1850. The birth came while she was writing but, as she recalled in a letter, she was "obliged to give previous attention to some other affairs—about noon the household were thrown into commotion by the arrival of a young stranger in these parts—said to be a great beauty—to have excellent lungs & to look just like his pa, three very important items in his collection."

Once settled in, Mrs. Stowe wrote for several magazines, including the New-York Evangelist and the National Era in Washington, D.C. Rent for the home, then owned by the Titcomb family, was $125, higher than expected, and Mrs. Stowe wrote to offset that expense. It was here also that Harriet Beecher Stowe wrote her serialized novel Uncle Tom's Cabin. The idea first came to her in a vision while sitting in pew 23 in nearby First Parish Church, where she saw the Uncle Tom character wounded from a beating he endured from his enslaver. She is said to have read early drafts of the book's chapters to friends, including the college's future president Joshua Chamberlain and his soon-to-be wife Fanny Adams.

While living here, the Stowes supported the Underground Railroad. John Andrew Jackson, a fugitive slave who stayed with the family, wrote of hiding with them as he made his way to Canada in his narrative titled "The Experience of a Slave in South Carolina" (London: Passmore & Albaster, 1862). The Stowes stayed only two years in the home, but Mrs. Stowe later remarked those two years were the healthiest and happiest of her life.

== Later history ==
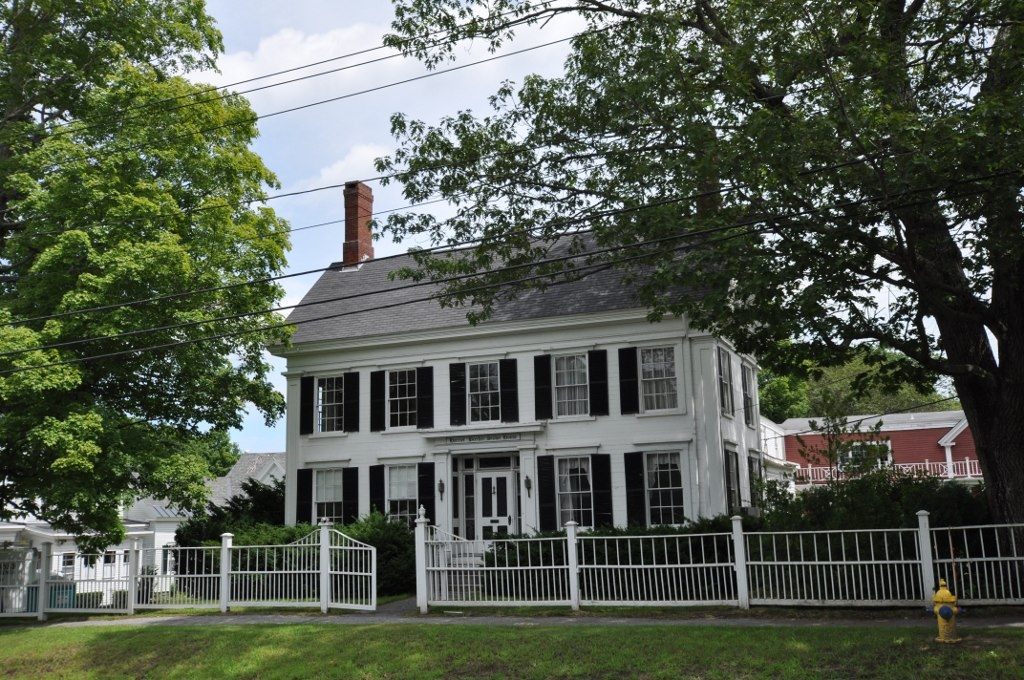
Stowe House in 2013

At some point, the home was altered and became a restaurant and hotel, with the front desk and a gift shop on the first floor with private rooms on the second floor. The house was designated a National Historic Landmark in 1962 and added to the National Register of Historic Places in 1966. It was designated a National Underground Railroad Network to Freedom site in 2016. It was purchased by Bowdoin College in 2001 for $1.3 million (~$2.19 million in 2024). It is currently still owned by Bowdoin College, which opened a public space, Harriet's Writing Room in May 2016. Much of the exterior is original to the Stowes' time there.

== See also ==
- Harriet Beecher Stowe House (Ohio)
- Harriet Beecher Stowe House (Hartford, Connecticut)
- List of National Historic Landmarks in Maine
- List of residences of American writers
- National Register of Historic Places listings in Cumberland County, Maine
