= Let Every Man Mind His Own Business =

"Let Every Man Mind His Own Business", by Harriet Beecher Stowe, is a short story in the temperance fiction genre. It was published in 1839.

== Plot summary ==
The story opens with Alfred Melton attempting to persuade his cousin and her fiancé, Augusta Elmore and Edward Howard, to sign a temperance pledge and swear off alcohol. They at first refuse noting their already temperate lifestyle and their basic philosophy of "let every man mind his own business". However, Alfred eventually convinces Augusta to sign on behalf of her husband, agreeing to watch over him. Very soon Augusta and Edward are happily married, mostly keeping to themselves and engaging in intellectual pursuits such as singing and reading in their home.

After some time the Howards begin to socialize more outside the home and engage in more "excitement". Eventually, the two have children and Augusta is unable to leave the house as frequently. During this time Edward succumbs to temptation and begins drinking more and more heavily, having to be carried home one evening by friends. Unfortunately, even Augusta's pleas cannot save him at this point and he begins to travel extensively, involving himself in risky business ventures which eventually leave him bankrupt.

Once all has been lost the Howard family moves to a new city where they are unknown so that they may fade into the background. For some time they live in poverty until one day Augusta's brother Henry arrives in an attempt to save her. She resists at first, but eventually leaves, an act which does cause a slight moral upturn in Edward.

One day, on an errand, Augusta visits the home of Mr. L, who is also being visited by Mr. Dallas. Mr. Dallas finds out that Augusta is married to Edward, whom he is familiar with, and he hatches a scheme to save the Howard family. When he first approaches Edward to offer help, Edward resists, feeling that he is already too lost. However, he eventually breaks down and agrees to move to the home of Mr. Dallas and attempt a reformation. At first his stay is characterized as imprisonment by Mr. Dallas, but this is necessary since Edward is suffering from terrible fevers and delirium. Before long, Edward is recovered and rejoins Augusta to raise their happy family.

== Publication history ==
The story was originally published as "The Drunkard Reclaimed" in 1839 in the New-York Evangelist. It was republished in several gift books fore being collected in Stowe's compilation The Mayflower, and Miscellaneous Writings (1843). The Evangelist published several of Stowe's earliest works, mostly lighter pieces, but "The Drunkard Reclaimed" was her first addressing a serious social issue. In 1845, the magazine published her first work using the theme of slavery, titled "Immediate Emancipation".
