= Matilda Case =

19th-century American legal case

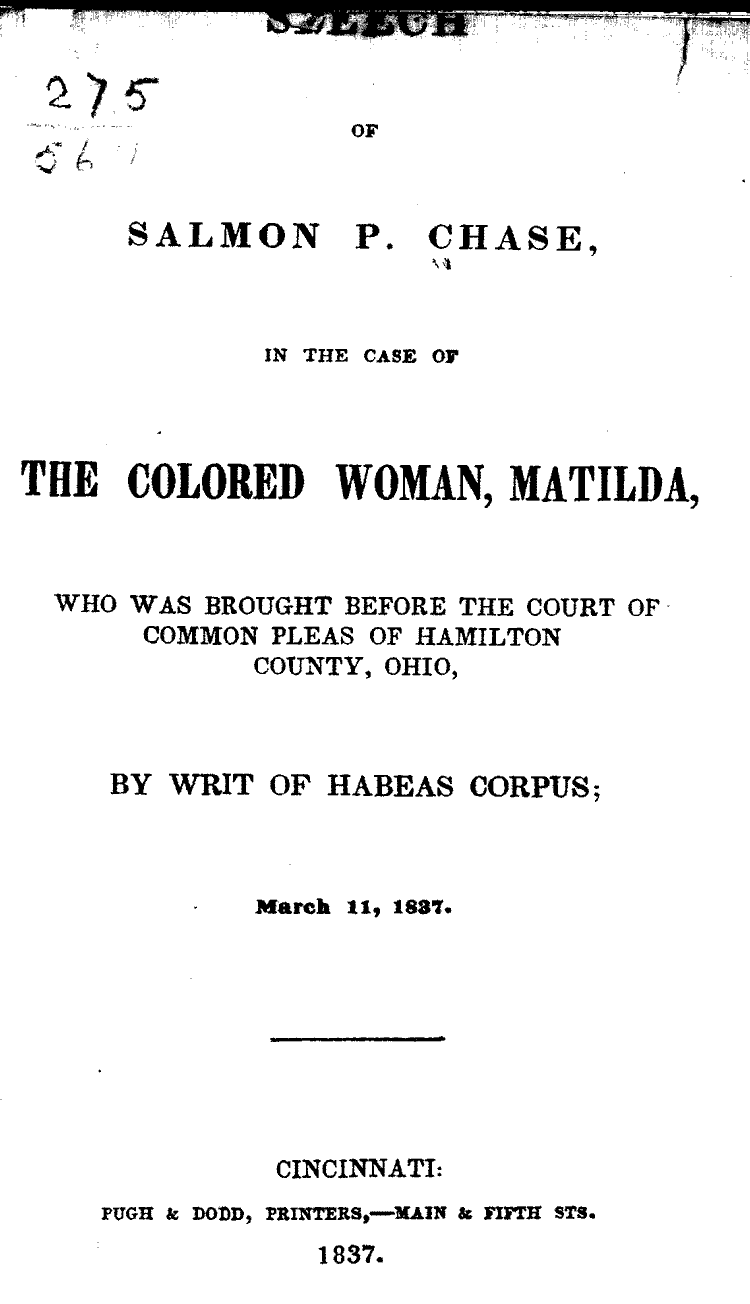
Pamphlet containing legal arguments used in the defense of "The Colored Woman, Matilda" (1837)

The Matilda Case involved Matilda, a 20-year-old woman whose father, Missouri planter Larkin Lawrence, claimed to own her as his slave. In 1837, she fled from her master-father in Cincinnati, a city located in the free state of Ohio. Matilda was captured and returned to her master by order of the local courts, based on the Fugitive Slave Act of 1793.

Cincinnati attorney Salmon P. Chase, along with his partner Samuel Eells, in alliance with local abolitionist and publisher James G. Birney, acted in her defense. Though unsuccessful in obtaining Matilda's freedom, the arguments Chase advanced formed part of the legal basis for the radical anti-slavery Constitutionalism of the Republican Party that emerged in the 1850s and the Civil War. The Matilda Case "quickly became a turning point in the history of anti-slavery politics" and "the first major abolitionist challenge to fugitive slave recaptures".

== Background ==
Matilda Lawrence was both the mulatto daughter and the slave of Larkin Lawrence, a Missouri planter. Matilda's mulatto mother, also a slave, raised her while serving as housekeeper on the Lawrence estate. Upon her mother's death, the 16-year-old Matilda assumed the duties of housekeeper.

In 1836, Larkin Lawrence traveled with 19-year-old Matilda to the free state of New York for an extended visit. As Matilda was a "light mulatto" he successfully presented his daughter/slave - "of striking beauty and engaging manners" - as his white offspring, concealing her servile status in Missouri. When Matilda implored her master-father to provide documents freeing her, he refused and made haste to return with her to Missouri. Stopping en route in Cincinnati, Ohio, Matilda fled secretly into the city when her owner rejected a final plea for freedom. Her whereabouts was concealed by local abolitionists until her owner-father departed Cincinnati several days later.

Believing she had secured her independence, Matilda found work as a housekeeper with the well-known anti-slavery activist James G. Birney. A former slave owner, Birney was publisher for the abolitionist journal The Philanthropist. Birney claimed that he was unaware of Matilda's ancestry when he hired her, as she had divulged little about her personal history and appeared to be white.

Unbeknownst to Matilda or Birney, Larkin Lawrence had engaged a slave catcher, John W. Riley, to effect Matilda's capture and return to Missouri. After a lengthy surveillance of the Birney residence, Riley and his associates obtained a warrant for Matilda's arrest and took her into custody on March 10, 1837.

Birney quickly enlisted Cincinnati attorney and abolitionist Salmon P. Chase who had successfully represented the publisher in 1836 after an anti-abolitionist mob attacked the offices of The Philanthropist. Chase immediately demanded a writ of habeas corpus for the release of the jailed Matilda. Birney, in turn, had been charged with harboring an escaped slave in his home. The cases were handled separately by the courts. Birney and Chase collaborated closely in preparing their legal defense.

== Legal case ==
John W. Riley's affidavit submitted to a local magistrate called for the arrest and detention of Matilda, stating simply that she was the property of Larkin Lawrence and that she had escaped from his custody while in Cincinnati. The magistrate added that Matilda was "a colored girl".

Challenging the legitimacy of the affidavit, Chase offered a number of broad and wide-ranging legal arguments in court, invoking the Somerset principle, The Fugitive Slave Act of 1793, the Northwest Ordinance, and the free-state statutes of Ohio. As Matilda had not fled her master from a slave state to a free state, Chase argued that no violation of Fugitive Slave Law had occurred. Chase asked the court to consider the ramifications of the case "where any person can be dragged, by any other person who chooses to set up a claim against him as a fugitive servant" in which local authorities would determine whether the individual would be reduced to a form of property.

Chase made a "tactical" error in failing to emphasize the circumstances of Matilda's "escape" from her "master": in voluntarily bringing his slave to Ohio, Larkin Lawrence arguably forfeited his Missouri-established right of property in Matilda. The defense failed to convince the presiding Judge David Kirkpatrick Este. Deciding for the plaintiff, he reaffirmed the constitutionality of the Fugitive Slave law. Matilda was instantly seized by Riley's associates and carried back into slavery, "her ultimate fate unknown".

The pamphlet that Chase issued on the case entitled "The Colored Woman, Matilda" (1837) set forth his legal arguments and was widely circulated. The case attracted many freed slaves to Cincinnati, many of whom many Chase defended in court cases, and earning him the sobriquet "attorney general for the fugitive slaves".

=== Birney phase ===
James G. Birney was sued for allegedly violating Larkin Lawrence's property rights in violation of the constitutionally sanctioned Fugitive Slave Act. In Birney's defense, Chase maintained that the state of Ohio provided no statutes establishing property rights in persons held to service, nor the US Constitution, which defined slaves as "persons", not property. As such, he had committed no crime. Birney was found guilty in the lower court and he appealed to the Ohio Supreme Court. There Chase relied less on his constitutional arguments and more on Birney's testimony that he was not aware of Matilda's slave status in Missouri, nor that her departure from her father from the northern shore of the Ohio River never established fugitive status for his employee. The court reversed Birney's conviction on a technicality without addressing the constitutional issues raised by Chase.

== Sources ==
- Baringer, William E. 1971. "The Politics of Abolition: Salmon P. Chase in Cincinnati". Journal of the Abraham Lincoln Association.
- Foner, Eric. 2010. The Fiery Trial: Abraham Lincoln and American Slavery. W. W. Norton & Company. New York. ISBN 978-0-393-06618-0
- Foner, Eric. 1970. Free Soil, Free Labor, Free Men: The Ideology of the Republican Party Before the Civil War. Oxford University Press. London. ISBN 0-19-501352-2
- Oakes, James. 2013. Freedom National: The Destruction of Slavery in the United States, 1861-1865. W. W. Norton & Company. New York. ISBN 978-0-393-06531-2
- Stahr, Walter. 2021. Salmon P. Chase: Lincold's Vital Rival. Simon & Schuster. New York. ISBN 978-1-50119923-3
