= Alpha Delta Phi Fraternity =

North American collegiate fraternity

Alpha Delta Phi
- ΑΔΦ
- Founded: 1832; 194 years ago Hamilton College
- Type: Social
- Affiliation: NIC
- Status: Active
- Scope: International
- Motto: Manus Multæ Cor Unum "Many Hands, One Heart"
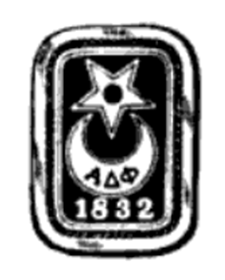
- Member badge
- Colors: Emerald; Pearl
- Symbol: Star, crescent, sword, spear, escutcheon
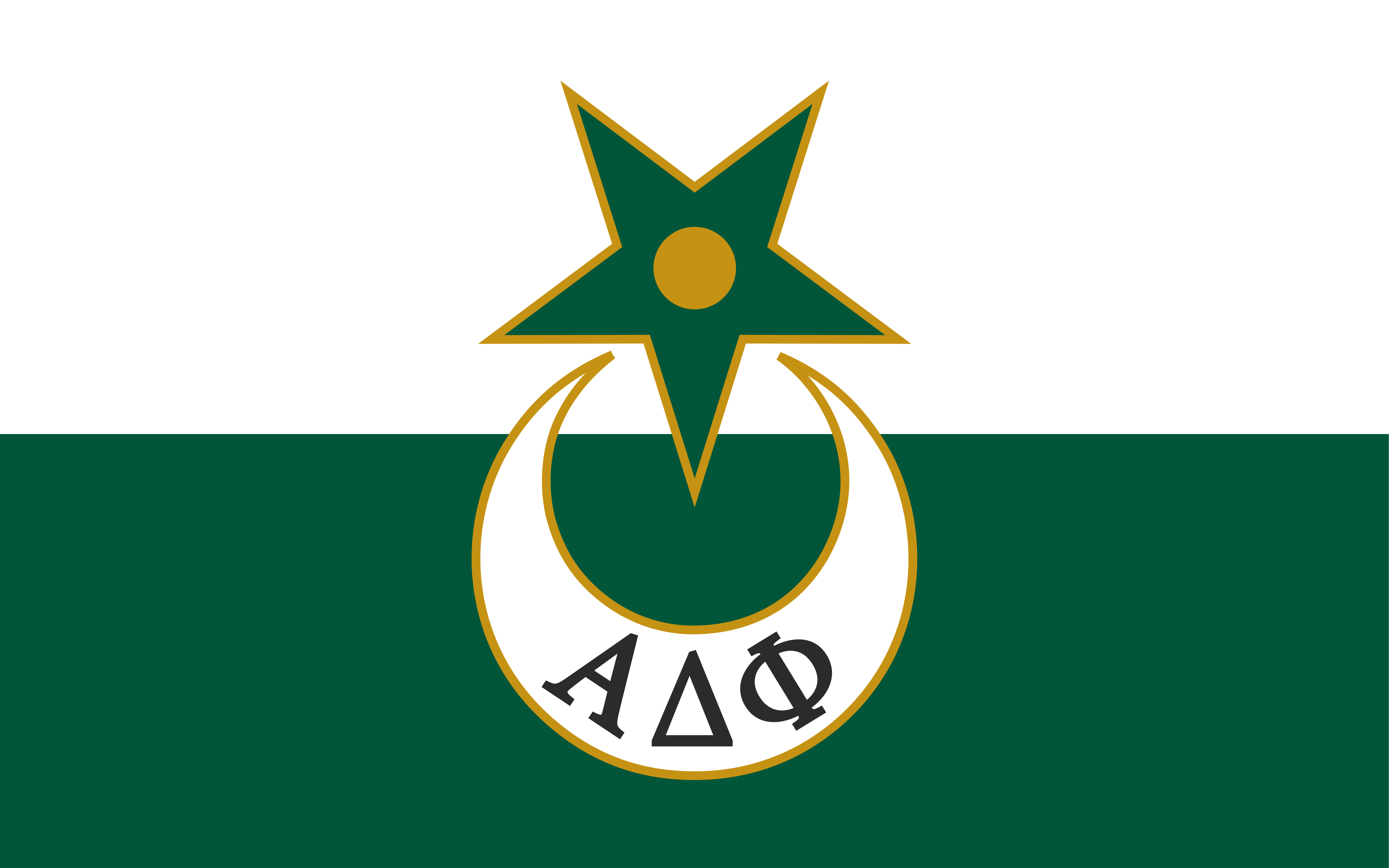
- Flag
- Flower: Lily of the Valley
- Publication: XAIPE
- Chapters: 33
- Colonies: 2
- Members: 1,521 active 53,000+ lifetime
- Headquarters: 60 South 6th Street, Suite 2800; Minneapolis, Minnesota 55402; United States
- Website: ADPhi Fraternity

Alpha Delta Phi (ΑΔΦ), commonly known as Alpha Delt, AD, ADPhi or ADP, is a North American Greek-letter social college fraternity. Alpha Delta Phi was originally founded as a literary society by Samuel Eells and four other students in 1832 at Hamilton College in Clinton, New York. Its more than 50,000 alumni include former presidents and senators of the United States, and justices of the Supreme Court.

The mission of the Alpha Delta Phi Fraternity is to provide a comprehensive and positive personal growth experience for all undergraduate and alumni brothers: social, ethical, leadership, scholastic, community service, and literary.

== Founding ==
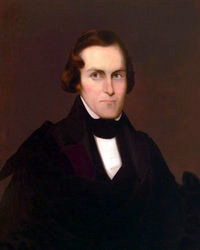
Portrait of Samuel Eells, who founded Alpha Delta Phi at Hamilton College in 1832

When Samuel Eells arrived on campus at Hamilton College, he found two existing literary societies, the Phoenix and the Philopeuthian, the latter of which he reluctantly joined. Eells quickly became disenchanted with both societies' recruiting tactics and exclusivity and considered creating his own society which would disavow what he described as jealous and angry competition between the two. Eells proposed to select members from both the Phoenix and the Philopeuthian and found a new society of limited membership based on "the loftiest of intellectual and moral ideals."

In January 1832, Eells gathered four other members, two from the Phoenix and two from the Philopeuthian, to a meeting in his room where the fraternity was established. The other men were Lorenzo Latham, John Curtiss Underwood, Oliver Andrew Morse and Henry Lemuel Storrs. At that meeting, Eells wrote the constitution and he and Latham designed the fraternity's emblem and symbols.

Alpha Delta Phi was the first fraternity to establish a chapter west of the Appalachian Mountains when it formed a chapter at Miami University in 1832. This chapter preceded the formation of three national fraternities at Miami University known as the Miami Triad in the years that followed.

The Alpha Delta Phi Fraternity is a charter member of the North American Interfraternity Conference, formerly known as the National Interfraternity Conference; NIC. A Brother of Alpha Delta Phi, Hamilton W. Mabie (Williams College, class of 1867), was the first President of the NIC. The Alpha Delta Phi Society, a gender-inclusive offshoot of the Fraternity, was not able to maintain membership in the NIC as a result of its decision to admit non-male-identifying members.

Alpha Delta Phi is both a social fraternity and a literary society. As part of this focus, the Alpha Delta Phi Foundation (formerly the Samuel Eells Literary and Educational Foundation) makes educational grants and sponsors annual literary competitions, which award cash prizes.

== Nomenclature and insignia ==
=== The Badge ===
The Badge is an oblong slab with rounded corners, displaying on a shield of black enamel a white Crescent bearing the letters Alpha Delta Phi. Above the Crescent is a green Star with a gold center, and below is the date 1832 in gold. On the back is engraved a Monument with crossed Sword and Spear. In addition, the member's initials and surname, chapter, and year of graduation appear on the back of the badge. The Badge is only to be worn with suit and tie attire. The Badge is properly worn over the heart with the horns of the Crescent pointing over the right shoulder.

=== The Crest ===
The Crest, which is the coat of arms, consists of the shield or escutcheon divided vertically into equal parts of green and white. It is bordered in black and studded with pearls. There is a small gold line between the center part of the shield and the border which has no particular significance except as a line of partition. On the shield in honor point are three Greek letters, horizontally aligned, alpha, delta, and phi in gold. Above the shield is an esquires helmet in profile facing left with the visor closed. Behind the shield is a Sword and Spear, both pointing upwards and both crossed saltirewise. Flanking the shield and issuing from the scroll on either side are two gold sprays of laurel leaved in gold. Beneath the escutcheon is a motto ribbon bearing the Latin phrase "Manus Multae Cor Unum", meaning "many hands, one heart". The whole escutcheon is radiant, meaning rays emanate from the top between the Spearpoint and Sword and base. There is a nimbus of very fine stars around the outer perimeter of the lower nimbus. Beneath the scroll is the date 1832.

=== Brothers-In-Arms Statue ===
The Brothers-in-Arms statue is a unique memorial to the 2,300 men of the fraternity, of Canada and the United States, who served in World War I, and especially for the 93 Brothers who made the supreme sacrifice.

=== Pledge Pin ===
The pledge pin is a shield divided vertically with the left half-colored green and the right half-colored white. Rules regarding the wearing of the pledge pin are established by each chapter.

== Chapters ==
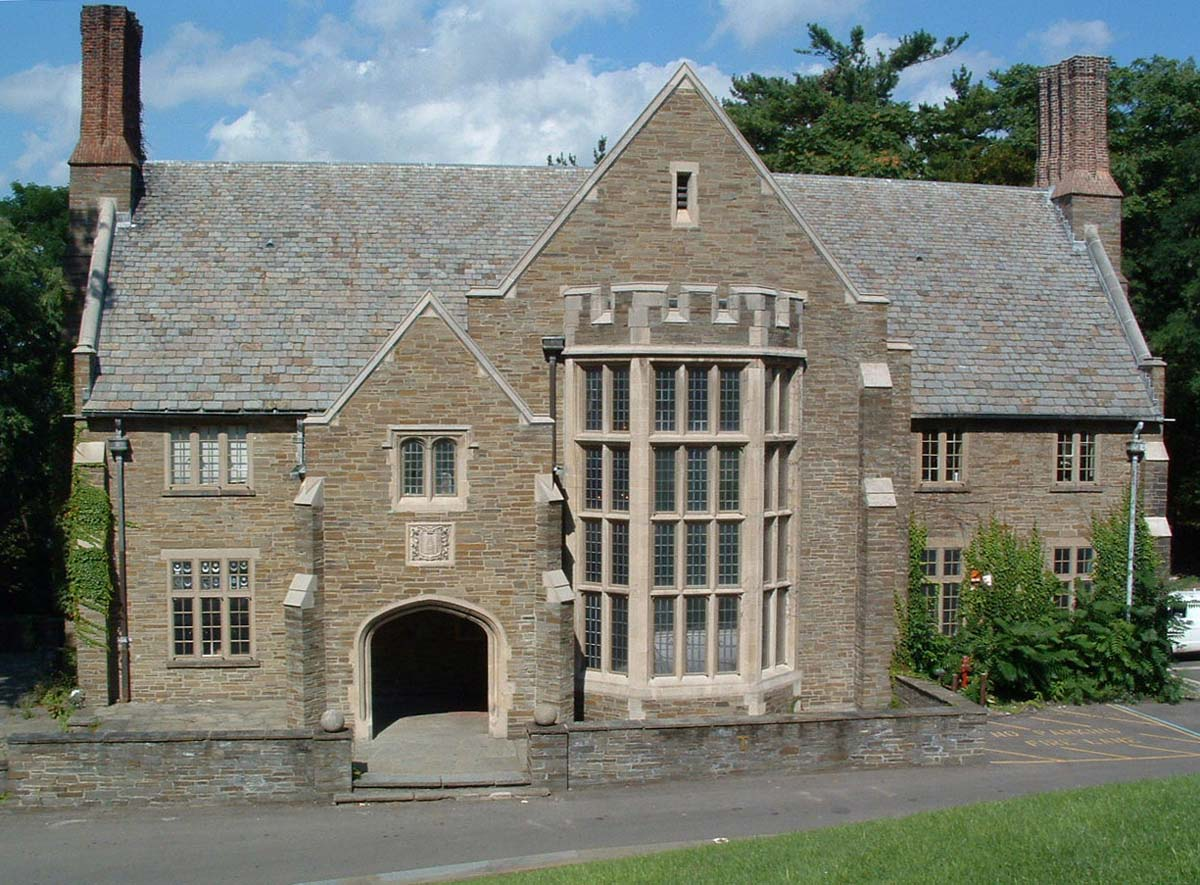
The Alpha Delta Phi chapter house at Cornell University in August 2002

In 2024, the fraternity had 33 active chapters and 2 colonies. Its regional alumni organization, the Midwest Association of Alpha Delta Phi, is more than 125 years old. Alpha Delta Phi chapter at Hamilton College is the third-oldest continuously operating chapter in the North American Fraternity System and the second oldest Alpha chapter.

At Yale University, it was mostly brothers of Alpha Delta Phi who were invited to join the university's top-ranked senior society Skull and Bones.

Students at Harvard formed a chapter of Alpha Delta Phi in 1836, but disaffiliated to form the independent final club, the A.D. in 1865. An Alpha Delta Phi chapter was restarted at Harvard in 1879, but again disaffiliated in 1906.

Alpha Delta Phi's Dartmouth College chapter was the inspiration for National Lampoon's Animal House. The movie was co-written by Chris Miller and Doug Kenney. The chapter was affiliated with Alpha Delta Phi from 1846 until 1969, when it broke away from the national organization and formed an independent one, Alpha Delta.

The University of Michigan's Peninsular chapter was founded on August 5, 1846, and is the oldest continuous Greek-letter fraternity on the campus. Authorized on June 12, 1846, by the President of the Alpha Delta Phi, William Henry Goodrich (Yale 1843), seven members were the first of the chapter to be initiated as brothers. In 1847, however, faculty at the university began barring class admission and expelling students who were members of secret societies. The conflict ended in 1852 when the chapter gained full recognition from the university, though its membership was reduced to three.

== Chapter houses ==
=== Cornell University chapter ===
In 1877, the Cornell University chapter's alumni group built its first house for the undergraduates, which has been described as the "first house in America built solely for fraternity use." It was designed by William Henry Miller. The chapter has since moved to 777 Stewart Avenue into a house designed by John Russell Pope.

=== University of Illinois chapter ===
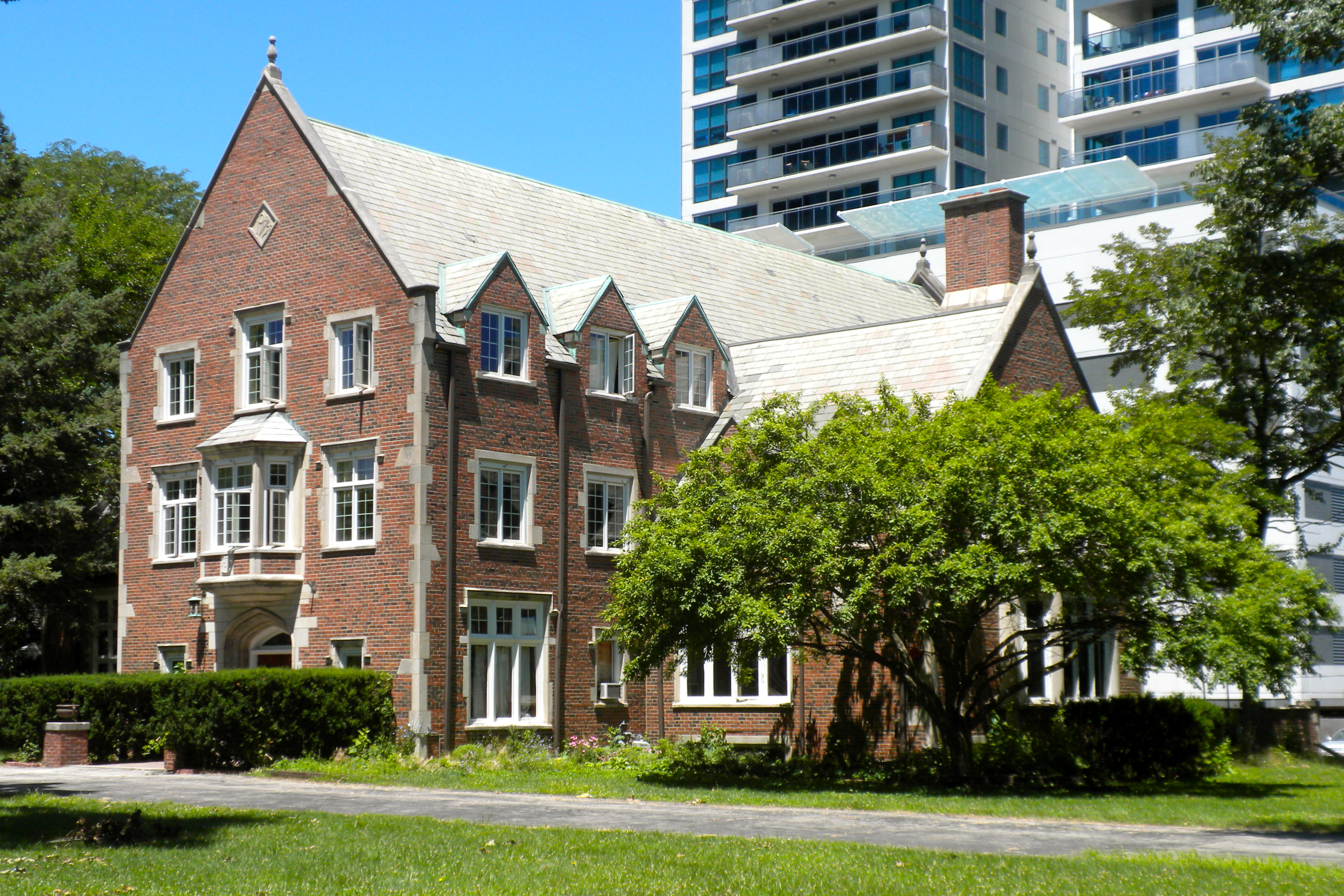
The University of Illinois Urbana-Champaign chapter house in June 2010; the house was demolished in 2018.

The original chapter house at the University of Illinois Urbana-Champaign was built in 1924 and 1925 for the fraternity. This three-story Tudor Revival style chapter house was designed by architect Ralph W. Varney, an Alpha Delta Phi brother. The building was added to the National Register of Historic Places on May 21, 1990. The house was demolished in 2018.

=== University of Michigan chapter ===
The University of Michigan chapter house, known as Stone House, was the first fraternity house built on the campus. It was erected in 1883 and continued to house the brothers of the Alpha Delta Phi until the current house was constructed on the same site in 1910.

== Notable members ==
The fraternity has 1,521 active members and 53,344 total initiated members as of 2024.

== 1832 Foundation ==
The mission of the 1832 Foundation is to solicit financial resources, provide faithful stewardship, and engage in high-quality ethical practices in support of the Alpha Delta Phi Fraternity and leadership development. The foundation aims to leave a legacy that builds leaders of good character and well-balanced men.

The Foundation is a self-governing, tax-exempt corporation founded August 1961, under Section 501(c)(3) of the Internal Revenue Code. It accepts deductible donations from Alpha Delts and others and makes grants and loans to chapters, individuals, and institutions of higher learning. The grants are intended to promote intellectual interest or achievement with qualified educational and literary programs. The Foundation has its own Board of Directors and functions independently of but in communication with the Fraternity.

== The Convention ==
The convention is composed of one delegate elected from each undergraduate chapter and alumni organization, each delegate being entitled to one vote. Each August, the convention is hosted at a different location and presided over by an Honorary Chairman, both of which are chosen by the Board of Governors. The convention hears annual reports from the Governors, approves the International's budget, decides constitutional questions, and has appellate jurisdiction over decisions of the Board of Governors and the Chapters.

=== Board of Governors ===
The convention also elects the Board of Governors. There are eleven Alumni Governors, elected for three-year terms, and a Student Governor elected annually. The terms of the Alumni Governors are staggered to provide continuity. There are other restrictions on who may be elected to ensure that no region or chapter may dominate the Board.

The Board of Governors generally holds four regular meetings each year. One of these is at the convention; others are held at various chapter houses in the fall, winter, and spring.

The governors elect the president, vice president, secretary, and treasurer. The president, with board approval, may appoint an assistant treasurer and committee chairmen, who may or may not be governors. An undergraduate Assistant Secretary is elected by the undergraduate delegates of the convention. The Board of Governors appoints Regional Directors to coordinate activities of interest to nearby chapters and alumni organizations.

== The Society ==
The Fraternity is a retronym used now to distinguish the all-male Alpha Delta Phi Fraternity from the gender-inclusive Alpha Delta Phi Society (discussed below). In general parlance, the Fraternity refers to itself simply as the "Alpha Delta Phi"; the Society uses either the "Alpha Delta Phi Society" or "The Society".

=== Fraternity-Society Agreement of 1992 ===
The Brunonian chapter at Brown University first initiated women into its local membership in November 1973, and this was followed by a proposal at the 1974 national convention to either allow individual chapters to admit women or to do so fraternity-wide. This debate was often contentious, with most chapters opposed, and some members lobbying for full admission of women, but a larger number wanting to ban women altogether or grant them some form of associate membership. In 1992, at the Fraternity's 160th Annual Convention held in Brainerd, Minnesota, an agreement allowed five chapters to withdraw from the fraternity (the Brunonian, Columbia, Middletown (Wesleyan University), Stanford and Bowdoin chapters) and to allow those chapters wishing to be gender-inclusive to create their organization, which resulted in the legal formation of two separate organizations, the all-male Alpha Delta Phi Fraternity and the Alpha Delta Phi Society, the latter of which granted each of its chapters "home rule" permission to determine its gender make-up.

Under the terms of this agreement, the Fraternity and the Society would be completely separate and independent legal entities, with separate governing bodies. The two organizations were not part of the same entity and did not share membership, except for male members of the Society who joined before 1992. Both groups would be licensees who share the Greek letters and intellectual property such as history and songs. The agreement put limitations on both organizations as to where they could have chapters, and there were limitations on the Society's use of the name "Alpha Delta Phi".

=== Fraternity-Society Agreement of 2017 ===
On August 12, 2017, at the Fraternity's 185th Annual Convention held in Minneapolis, Minnesota, the Fraternity and the Society entered into a new agreement that replaced the Fraternity-Society Agreement of 1992. The new agreement maintained the original rights of the two independent and legally separate organizations to license and share the Greek letters alpha, delta, and phi, and other intellectual property. The new agreement removed all restrictions on the Society's license to use the name "Alpha Delta Phi Society." It also removed most of the limitations on where either organization could have chapters.

The Society as a national organization is gender-inclusive, and the Society continues to espouse "home rule" for its chapters, allowing them to determine their own membership rules. As of today, every Society chapter has been a gender-inclusive organization since at least the date of the Society's founding (for chapters that predate the foundation) or since the creation of the chapter (for newer chapters).

== Local chapter and member misconduct ==
In 2024, the fraternity's chapter at the University of Iowa was suspended for hazing until 2029. University police responded to a fire alarm at their fraternity house where they discovered 56 shirtless, blindfolded pledges within the basement, covered in food and possibly other substances. In 2026, the police footage of the situation was released and went viral on social media.

In November 2025, a lawsuit was brought against the fraternity after a 19-year-old student drowned during a party at the University of California, Berkeley chapter.

In October 2026, a lawsuit was brought against the fraternity and its Chicago chapter after an alleged sexual assault took place during a party in February 2026.

== See also ==
- Alpha Delta Phi Society
- Alpha Delta, former chapter at Dartmouth College
- Hazing in fraternities and sororities
- List of social fraternities
- Omicron Kappa Epsilon
