= Harriet Beecher Stowe House (Cincinnati, Ohio) =

Historic house in Ohio, United States

- Stowe, Harriet Beecher, House
- U.S. National Register of Historic Places
- Cincinnati Local Historic Landmark
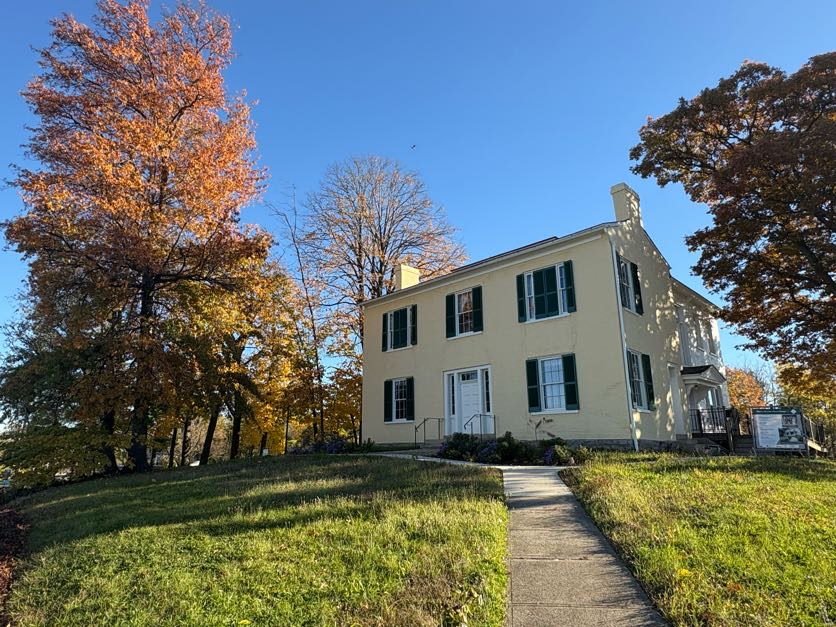
- Location: Cincinnati, Ohio
- Coordinates: 39°7′58.88″N 84°29′15.57″W
- Built: 1832
- NRHP reference No.: 70000497
- Added to NRHP: November 10, 1970

The Harriet Beecher Stowe House is a historic home in Cincinnati, Ohio which was once the residence of influential antislavery author Harriet Beecher Stowe, author of the 1852 novel Uncle Tom's Cabin and a boarding house for African Americans known as the Edgemont Inn and Tavern.

== History ==
Rev. Lyman Beecher accepted a job at Lane Theological Seminary in the Walnut Hills area of Cincinnati, founded in 1830. Rev. Beecher was a Congregationalist minister. He had dreamed of moving west to promote his brand of Christianity as early as 1830, when he wrote to his daughter Catharine: "I have thought seriously of going over to Cincinnati, the London of the West, to spend the remnant of my days in that great conflict, and in consecrating all my children to God in that region who are willing to go. If we gain the West, all is safe; if we lose it, all is lost."

The Harriet Beecher Stowe House and its Ohio Historical Marker

In September 1832, 21-year old Harriet Beecher (not yet Mrs. Stowe) moved with her family from Litchfield, Connecticut, to Ohio. The company included her father, her stepmother, her aunt Esther, her siblings Catharine and George, and half-siblings Isabella, Thomas, and James. The extended family previously had not been living together but the various parts of the family from Boston and Hartford met in New York to begin their trip together. Along the way, they traveled through other eastern cities to raise money for the seminary. The journey was long and difficult. Isabella later recalled, "After a week in Philadelphia, we chartered a big, old-fashioned stage, with four great horses, for Wheeling, Virginia, and spent a week or more on the way, crossing the Alleghenies, before ever a railroad was thought of, and enjoyed every minute of the way." They amused themselves by singing hymns while the journey that normally took 48 hours stretched to eight days.

Cincinnati was then an area active in the abolitionist movement. It was also one of the fastest-growing cities in the nation at the time, with its population leaping from 10,000 people in 1820 to 25,000 in 1830. By 1850, thanks to an influx of German and Irish immigrants, it became the sixth-largest city in the United States. Catharine, Harriet's older sister by eleven years, established the Western Female Institute in town.

It was in Cincinnati that Harriet Beecher began her writing career. She published her book The Mayflower: Sketches of Scenes and Character Among the Descendants of the Pilgrims in 1834. It was also while living in Cincinnati that Stowe traveled to Maysville, Kentucky, in 1833 and witnessed a slave auction. The distress she felt was one of several experiences that inspired her book Uncle Tom's Cabin years later.

Harriet lived here for various periods of time from 1833 until her marriage to professor Calvin Ellis Stowe in 1836. Her first two children, twins Eliza and Harriet, were born in the house in 1836. Harriet's brother, Henry Ward Beecher, also resided in the Cincinnati Beecher House. Rev. Henry Ward Beecher was an early leader in the women's suffrage movement and a popular Protestant minister.

== Description ==
The 5,000 square foot house was completed in 1833 and was constructed specifically to house the president of the Lane Seminary. The house was provided by the seminary to the Beechers. Harriet and most of her brothers and sisters (11 Beecher children lived to adulthood) lived with their father in this house.

== Museum today ==
The Harriet Beecher Stowe House in Cincinnati is owned by the Ohio History Connection. It is located in the Walnut Hills neighborhood (Martin Luther King exit from Interstate 71) at 2950 Gilbert Avenue, Cincinnati, OH 45206 and is operated by the Friends of the Harriet Beecher Stowe House, Inc.

It is open to the public and is adjoined by a small park and garden. It is operated as a historical and cultural site, focusing on Stowe and her family, the Lane Seminary, abolitionists, the Underground Railroad, and the House's time as the Edgemont Inn & Tavern. The site also presents African-American history.

== See also ==
- Harriet Beecher Stowe House (Brunswick, Maine)
- Harriet Beecher Stowe House (Hartford, Connecticut)
- List of Underground Railroad sites
- List of residences of American writers
