= Harriet Beecher Stowe =

American abolitionist and author (1811-1896)

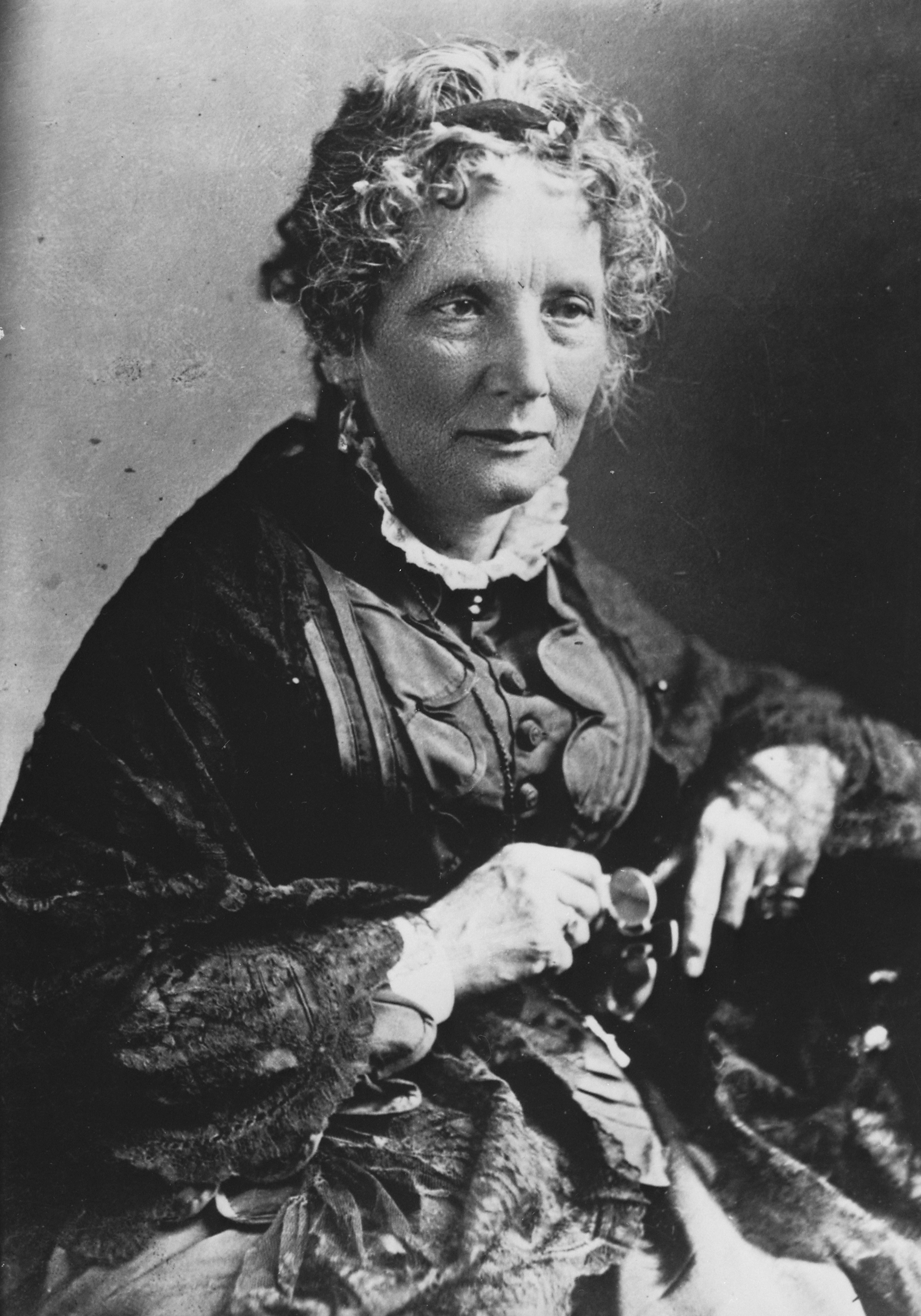
- Stowe c. 1870
- Born: Harriet Elisabeth Beecher; June 14, 1811; Litchfield, Connecticut, U.S.
- Died: July 1, 1896 (aged 85); Hartford, Connecticut, U.S.
- Spouse: Calvin Ellis Stowe (m. 1836; died 1886)
- Children: 7
- Relatives: Beecher family
- Writing career
- Pen name: Christopher Crowfield
- Notable work: Uncle Tom's Cabin

Harriet Elisabeth Beecher Stowe (/stoʊ/; June 14, 1811 – July 1, 1896) was an American author and abolitionist. She came from the Beecher family and wrote a popular novel called Uncle Tom's Cabin (1852), which depicts the harsh conditions experienced by enslaved African Americans. The book reached an audience of millions as a novel and play and was influential in the United States and in Great Britain, energizing anti-slavery forces in the American North, while provoking widespread anger in the South. Stowe wrote over 30 books, including novels, three travel memoirs, and collections of articles and letters. She was influential both for her writings and for her public stances and debates on social issues of the day.

== Life and work ==
Harriet Elisabeth Beecher was born in Litchfield, Connecticut, on June 14, 1811. She was the sixth of 11 children born to the outspoken Calvinist preacher Lyman Beecher. Harriet's mother was Beecher's first wife, Roxana (Foote), a deeply religious woman who died on September 25, 1816, when Harriet was only five years old. Roxana's maternal grandfather was General Andrew Ward, who fought in the Revolutionary War. Harriet's siblings included a sister, Catharine Beecher, who became an educator and author, and brothers who became ministers, including the famous preacher and abolitionist Henry Ward Beecher, as well as Charles Beecher and Edward Beecher.

Harriet enrolled in the Hartford Female Seminary run by her older sister Catharine, where she received a traditional academic education – uncommon for women at the time – with a focus on classics, languages, and mathematics. Among her classmates was Sarah P. Willis, who later wrote under the pseudonym Fanny Fern.

In 1832, at the age of 21, Harriet Beecher moved to Cincinnati, Ohio, to join her father, who had become the president of Lane Theological Seminary. There, she also joined the Semi-Colon Club, a literary salon and social club, whose members included the Beecher sisters, Caroline Lee Hentz, Salmon P. Chase (future governor of Ohio and United States Secretary of the Treasury under President Abraham Lincoln), Emily Blackwell, and others. Cincinnati's trade and shipping business on the Ohio River was booming, drawing numerous migrants from different parts of the country, including many escaped slaves, bounty hunters seeking them, and Irish immigrants who worked on the state's canals and railroads. In 1829, the Irish attacked Blacks, wrecking areas of the city, trying to push out these competitors for jobs. Beecher met a number of African Americans who had suffered in those attacks, and their experience contributed to her later writing about slavery. Riots took place again in 1836 and 1841, driven also by native-born anti-abolitionists.

Harriet was also influenced by the Lane Debates on Slavery. The biggest event ever to take place at Lane, it was the series of debates held on 18 days in February 1834, between colonization and abolition defenders, decisively won by Theodore Weld and other abolitionists. Harriet attended most of the debates. Her father and the trustees, afraid of more violence from anti-abolitionist whites, prohibited any further discussions of the topic. The result was a mass exodus of the Lane students, together with a supportive trustee and a professor, who moved as a group to the new Oberlin Collegiate Institute after its trustees agreed, by a close and acrimonious vote, to accept students regardless of "race", and to allow discussions of any topic.

It was in the literary club at Lane that she met Rev. Calvin Ellis Stowe, a widower who was a professor of Biblical Literature at the seminary. The two married at the Seminary on January 6, 1836. The Stowes had seven children, including twin daughters.

=== Uncle Tom's Cabin and Civil War ===
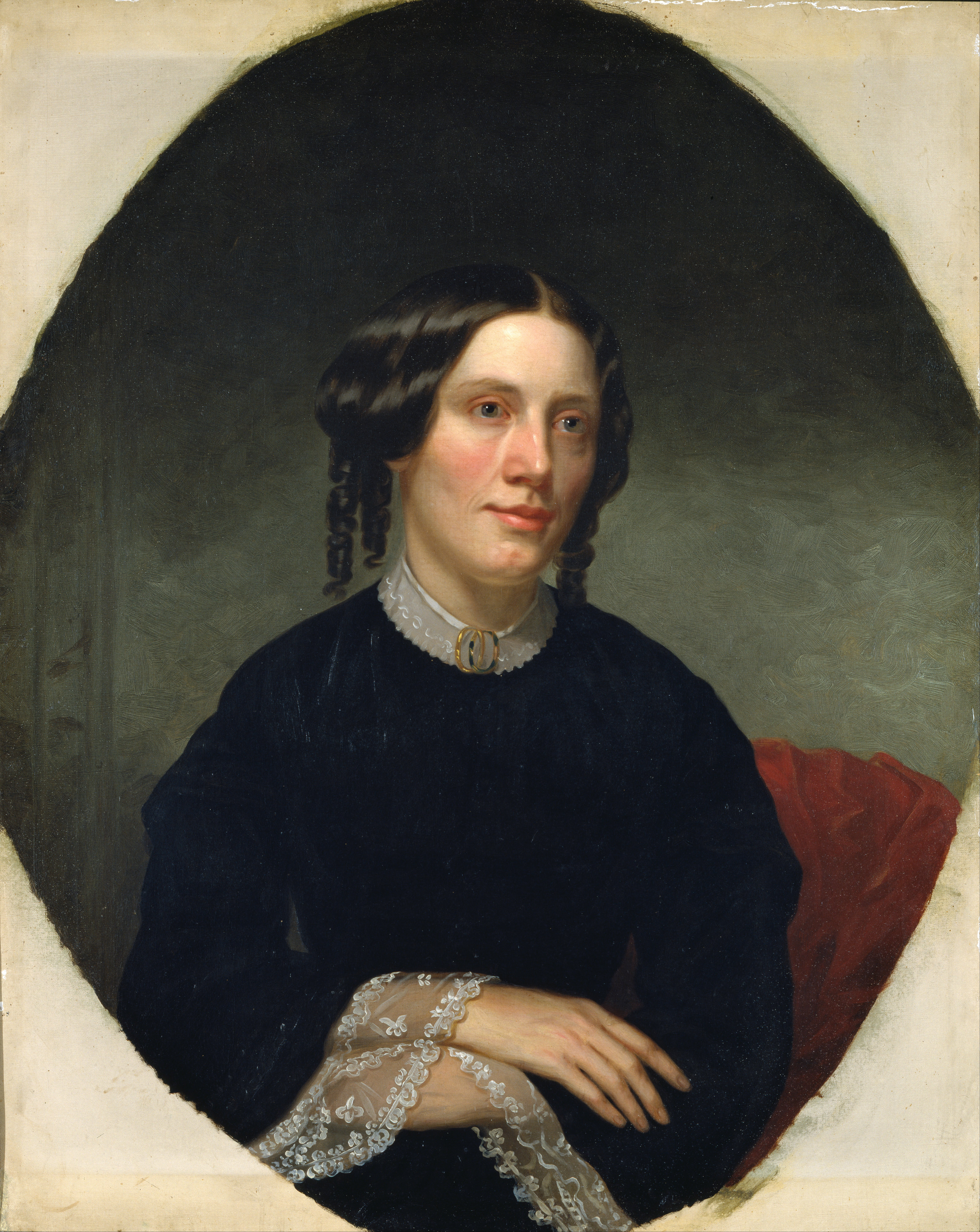
Portrait of Stowe by Alanson Fisher, 1853 (National Portrait Gallery)

The Congress passed the Fugitive Slave Act of 1850, prohibiting assistance to fugitives and strengthening sanctions applicable in free states. At the time, Stowe had moved with her family to Brunswick, Maine, where her husband was teaching at Bowdoin College. Their home near the campus is now protected as a National Historic Landmark. The Stowes were ardent critics of slavery and supported the Underground Railroad, temporarily housing several fugitive slaves in their home. One fugitive from slavery, John Andrew Jackson, in his narrative The Experience of a Slave in South Carolina (London: Passmore & Albaster, 1862), wrote of hiding with Stowe in her house in Brunswick as he fled to Canada.

Stowe claimed to have had a vision of a dying slave during a communion service at Brunswick's First Parish Church, which inspired her to write his story. What also likely allowed her to empathize with slaves was the loss of her eighteen-month-old son, Samuel Charles Stowe. She noted, "Having experienced losing someone so close to me, I can sympathize with all the poor, powerless slaves at the unjust auctions. You will always be in my heart Samuel Charles Stowe". On March 9, 1850, Stowe wrote to Gamaliel Bailey, editor of the weekly anti-slavery journal The National Era, that she planned to write a story about the problem of slavery: "I feel now that the time is come when even a woman or a child who can speak a word for freedom and humanity is bound to speak. ... I hope every woman who can write will not be silent".

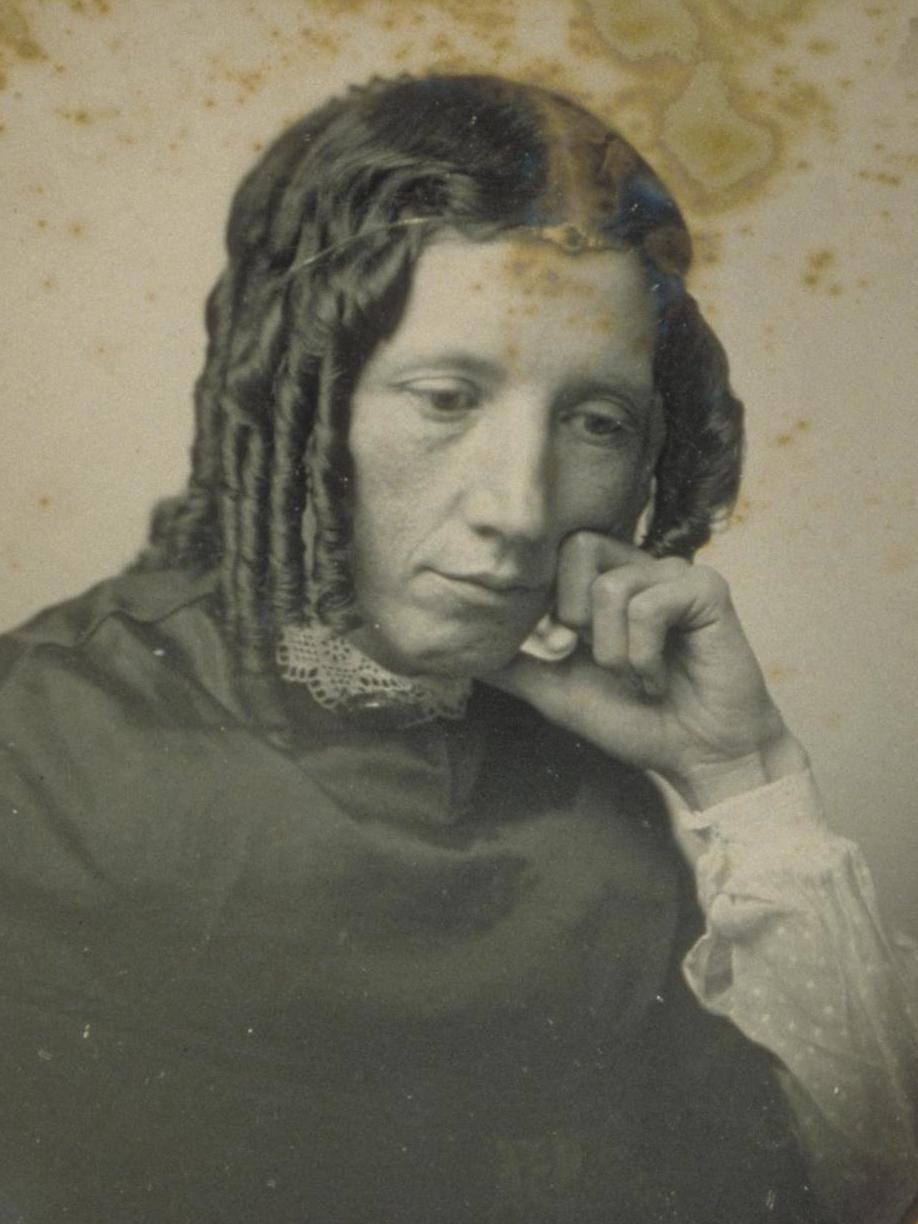
Daguerreotype portrait of Harriet Beecher Stowe, 1852

Shortly after in June 1851, when she was 40, the first installment of Uncle Tom's Cabin was published in serial form in the newspaper The National Era. She originally used the subtitle "The Man That Was a Thing", but it was soon changed to "Life Among the Lowly". Installments were published weekly from June 5, 1851, to April 1, 1852. For the newspaper serialization of her novel, Stowe was paid $400. Uncle Tom's Cabin was published in book form on March 20, 1852, by John P. Jewett with an initial print run of 5,000 copies. Each of its two volumes included three illustrations and a title-page designed by Hammatt Billings. In less than a year, the book sold an unprecedented 300,000 copies. By December, as sales began to wane, Jewett issued an inexpensive edition at 37 1/2 cents each to stimulate sales. Sales abroad, as in Britain where the book was a great success, earned Stowe nothing as there was no international copyright agreement in place during that era. In 1853, Stowe undertook a lecture tour of Britain and, to make up the royalties that she could not receive there, the Glasgow New Association for the Abolition of Slavery set up Uncle Tom's Offering.

According to Daniel R. Vollaro, the goal of the book was to educate Northerners on the realistic horrors of the things that were happening in the South. The other purpose was to try to make people in the South feel more empathetic towards the people they were forcing into slavery. The book's emotional portrayal of the effects of slavery on individuals captured the nation's attention. Stowe showed that slavery touched all of society, beyond the people directly involved as masters, traders and slaves. Her novel added to the debate about abolition and slavery, and aroused opposition in the South. In the South, Stowe was depicted as out of touch, arrogant, and guilty of slander, as she had never visited the South and had never seen a plantation. Within a year, 300 babies in Boston alone were named Eva (one of the book's characters), and a play based on the book opened in New York in November. Southerners quickly responded with numerous works of what are now called anti-Tom novels, seeking to portray Southern society and slavery in more positive terms. Many of these were bestsellers, although none matched the popularity of Stowe's work, which set publishing records.

After the start of the Civil War, Stowe traveled to the capital, Washington, D.C., where she met President Abraham Lincoln on November 25, 1862. Stowe's daughter, Hattie, reported, "It was a very droll time that we had at the White house I assure you. ... I will only say now that it was all very funny – and we were ready to explode with laughter all the while". What Lincoln said is a minor mystery. Her son later reported that Lincoln greeted her by saying, "so you are the little woman who wrote the book that started this great war", but this story has been found to be apocryphal. Her own accounts are vague, including the letter reporting the meeting to her husband: "I had a real funny interview with the President". After her brother, James Chaplin Beecher, was made commander of the 1st North Carolina Colored Infantry Regiment, Stowe designed the unit's flag.

=== Later literary career ===
In 1857, a group founded The Atlantic Monthly (later renamed The Atlantic) at a dinner party at the Parker House Hotel in Boston. Stowe was invited to the dinner party but declined because it served alcohol. She signed the manifesto that set out the goals of the paper, and The Atlantic today credits her as one of its founders.

Stowe wrote several articles and short stories that were published in The Atlantic Monthly. One of them, an article titled "The True Story of Lady Byron’s Life", was published in the September 1869 issue. In it, she alleged that Lord Byron had an affair with his half-sister. Her popularity declined in England after the publication of the article.

In 1868, Stowe became one of the first editors of Hearth and Home magazine, one of several new publications appealing to women; she departed after a year. Stowe campaigned for the expansion of married women's rights, arguing in 1869 that:

[T]he position of a married woman ... is, in many respects, precisely similar to that of the negro slave. She can make no contract and hold no property; whatever she inherits or earns becomes at that moment the property of her husband ... Though he acquired a fortune through her, or though she earned a fortune through her talents, he is the sole master of it, and she cannot draw a penny ... [I]n the English common law a married woman is nothing at all. She passes out of legal existence.

=== Later years ===
Stowe purchased property in Mandarin near Jacksonville, Florida. In response to a newspaper article in 1873, she wrote, "I came to Florida the year after the war and held property in Duval County ever since. In all this time I have not received even an incivility from any native Floridian".

Stowe is controversial for her support of Elizabeth Campbell, Duchess of Argyll, whose grandfather had been a primary enforcer of the Highland Clearances, the transformation of the remote Highlands of Scotland from a militia-based society to an agricultural one that supported far fewer people. The newly homeless moved to Canada, where very bitter accounts appeared. It was Stowe's assignment to refute them using evidence the Duchess provided, in Letter XVII Volume 1 of her travel memoir Sunny Memories of Foreign Lands. Stowe was criticized for her seeming defense of the clearances.

In the 1870s, Stowe's brother Henry Ward Beecher was accused of adultery and became the subject of a national scandal. Unable to bear the public attacks on her brother, Stowe again fled to Florida but asked family members to send her newspaper reports. Throughout the affair, she remained loyal to her brother and believed he was innocent.

After her return to Connecticut, Mrs. Stowe was among the founders of the Hartford Art School, which later became part of the University of Hartford.

Following her husband's death, in 1886 Harriet's own health rapidly declined. By 1888, The Washington Post reported that as a result of dementia, 77-year-old Stowe started writing Uncle Tom's Cabin over again. She imagined that she was engaged in the original composition, and for several hours every day she industriously used pen and paper, inscribing passages of the book almost exactly word for word. This was done unconsciously from memory, the author imagining that she composed the matter as she went along. To her diseased mind the story was brand new, and she frequently exhausted herself with labor that she regarded as freshly created.

Mark Twain, a neighbor of Stowe's in Hartford, recalled her last years in his autobiography:

Her mind had decayed, and she was a pathetic figure. She wandered about all the day long in the care of a muscular Irish woman. Among the colonists of our neighborhood the doors always stood open in pleasant weather. Mrs. Stowe entered them at her own free will, and as she was always softly slippered and generally full of animal spirits, she was able to deal in surprises, and she liked to do it. She would slip up behind a person who was deep in dreams and musings and fetch a war whoop that would jump that person out of his clothes. And she had other moods. Sometimes we would hear gentle music in the drawing-room and would find her there at the piano singing ancient and melancholy songs with infinitely touching effect.

Modern researchers now speculate that at the end of her life she was suffering from Alzheimer's disease.

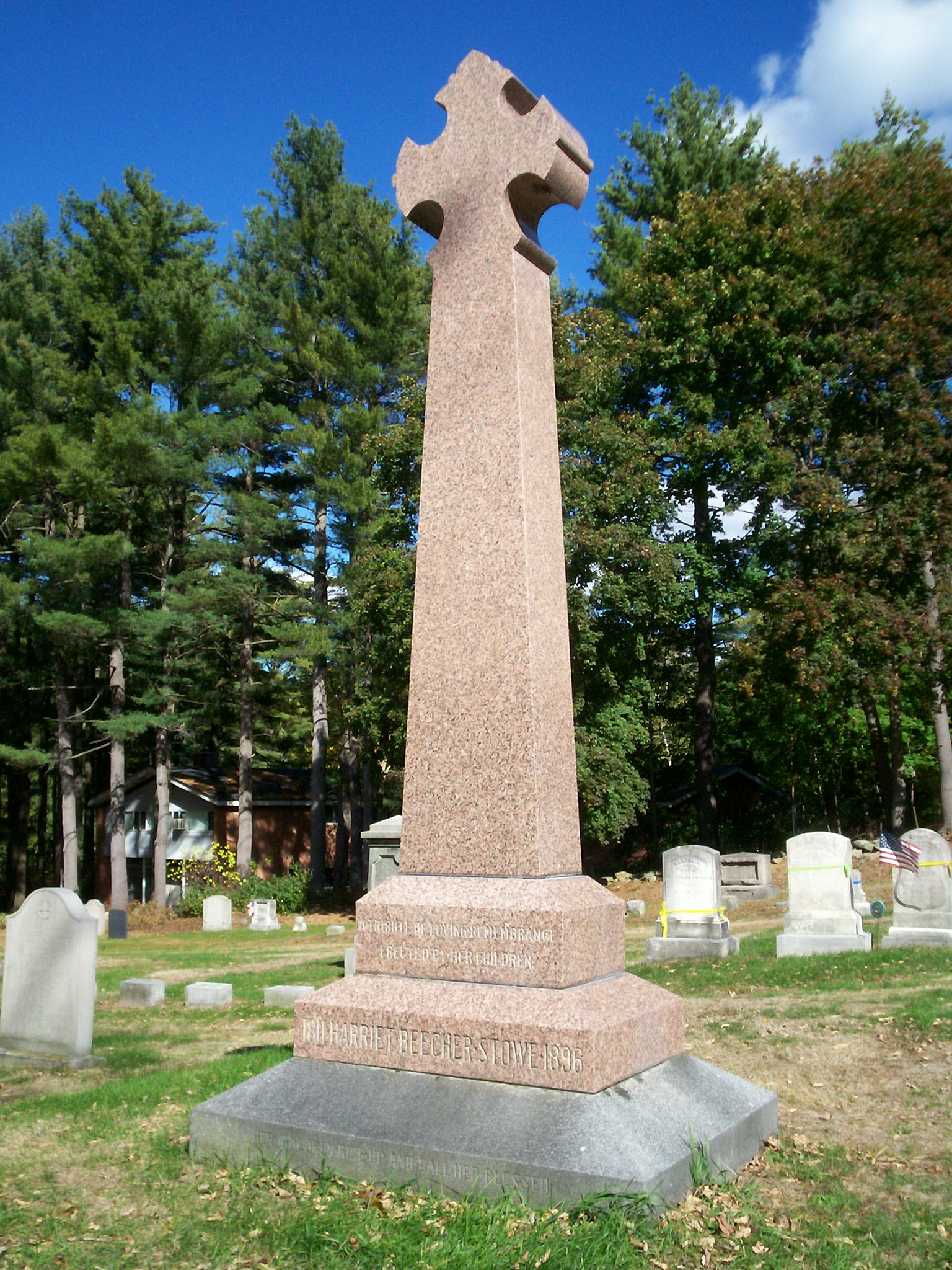
Harriet Beecher Stowe's grave

Harriet Beecher Stowe died on July 1, 1896, in Hartford, Connecticut, 17 days after her 85th birthday. She is buried in the historic cemetery at Phillips Academy in Andover, Massachusetts, along with her husband and their son Henry Ellis.

== Legacy ==
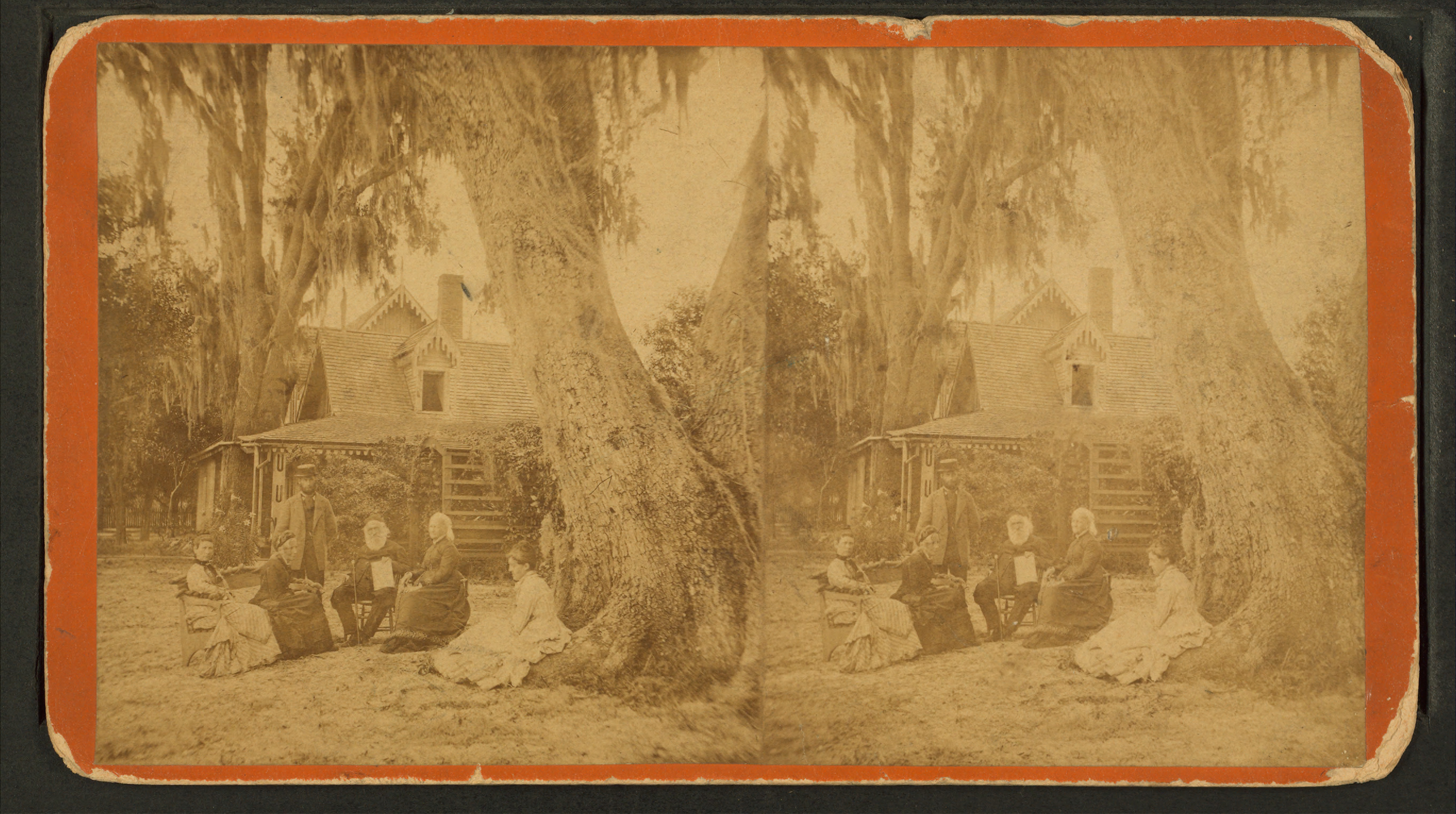
Stereoscope of Dr. Stowe and Harriet Beecher Stowe at the house in Mandarin, Florida

=== Landmarks ===
Multiple landmarks are dedicated to the memory of Harriet Beecher Stowe, and are located in several states including Ohio, Florida, Maine and Connecticut. The locations of these landmarks represent various periods of her life such as her father's house where she grew up and where she wrote her most famous work.

The Harriet Beecher Stowe House in Cincinnati, Ohio, is the former home of her father Lyman Beecher on the former campus of the Lane Seminary. Her father was a preacher who was greatly affected by the pro-slavery Cincinnati Riots of 1836. Harriet Beecher Stowe lived here until her marriage. It is open to the public and operated as a historical and cultural site, focusing on Harriet Beecher Stowe, the Lane Seminary and the Underground Railroad. The site also presents African-American history.

In the 1870s and 1880s, Stowe and her family wintered in Mandarin, Florida, now a neighborhood of modern consolidated Jacksonville, on the St. Johns River. Stowe wrote Palmetto Leaves while living in Mandarin, arguably an eloquent piece of promotional literature directed at Florida's potential Northern investors at the time. The book was published in 1873 and describes Northeast Florida and its residents. In 1874, Stowe was honored by the governor of Florida as one of several northerners who had helped Florida's growth after the war. In addition to her writings inspiring tourists and settlers to the area, she helped establish a church and a school, and she helped promote oranges as a major state crop through her own groves. The school she helped establish in 1870 was an integrated school in Mandarin for children and adults. This predated the national movement toward integration by more than a half century. The marker commemorating the Stowe family is located across the street from the former site of their cottage. It is on the property of the Community Club, at the site of a church where Stowe's husband once served as a minister. The Church of our Saviour is an Episcopal Church founded in 1880 by a group of people who had gathered for Bible readings with Professor Calvin E. Stowe and his famous wife. The house was constructed in 1883 which contained the Stowe Memorial stained glass window, created by Louis Comfort Tiffany.

The Harriet Beecher Stowe House in Brunswick, Maine, is where Stowe lived when she wrote Uncle Tom's Cabin. Her husband was teaching theology at nearby Bowdoin College, and she regularly invited students from the college and friends to read and discuss the chapters before publication. Future Civil War general, and later Governor, Joshua Chamberlain was then a student at the college and later described the setting. "On these occasions", Chamberlain noted, "a chosen circle of friends, mostly young, were favored with the freedom of her house, the rallying point being, however, the reading before publication, of the successive chapters of her Uncle Tom's Cabin, and the frank discussion of them". In 2001, Bowdoin College purchased the house, together with a newer attached building, and was able to raise the substantial funds necessary to restore the house. It is now open to the public.

The Harriet Beecher Stowe House in Hartford, Connecticut, is the house where Stowe lived for the last 23 years of her life. It was next door to the house of fellow author Mark Twain. In this 5,000 sq ft (460 m^{2}) cottage-style house, there are many of Beecher Stowe's original items and items from the time period. In the research library, which is open to the public, there are numerous letters and documents from the Beecher family. The house is open to the public and offers house tours on the hour.

In 1833, during Stowe's time in Cincinnati, the city was afflicted with a serious cholera epidemic. To avoid illness, Stowe made a visit to Washington, Kentucky, a major community of the era just south of Maysville. She stayed with the Marshall Key family, one of whose daughters was a student at Lane Seminary. It is recorded that Mr. Key took her to see a slave auction, as they were frequently held in Maysville. Scholars believe she was strongly moved by the experience. The Marshall Key home still stands in Washington. Key was a prominent Kentuckian; his visitors also included Henry Clay and Daniel Webster.

The Uncle Tom's Cabin Historic Site is part of the restored Dawn Settlement at Dresden, Ontario, which is 20 miles east of Algonac, Michigan. The community for freed slaves founded by the Rev. Josiah Henson and other abolitionists in the 1830s has been restored. There's also a museum. Henson and the Dawn Settlement provided Stowe with the inspiration for Uncle Tom's Cabin.

=== Honors ===
- In 1986, Stowe was inducted into the National Women's Hall of Fame.
- On June 13, 2007, the United States Postal Service issued a 75¢ Distinguished Americans series postage stamp in her honor.
- Harris–Stowe State University in St. Louis, Missouri, is named for Stowe and William Torrey Harris.
- In 2010, Stowe was proposed by the Ohio Historical Society as a finalist in a statewide vote for inclusion in Statuary Hall at the United States Capitol (Thomas Edison was chosen instead).

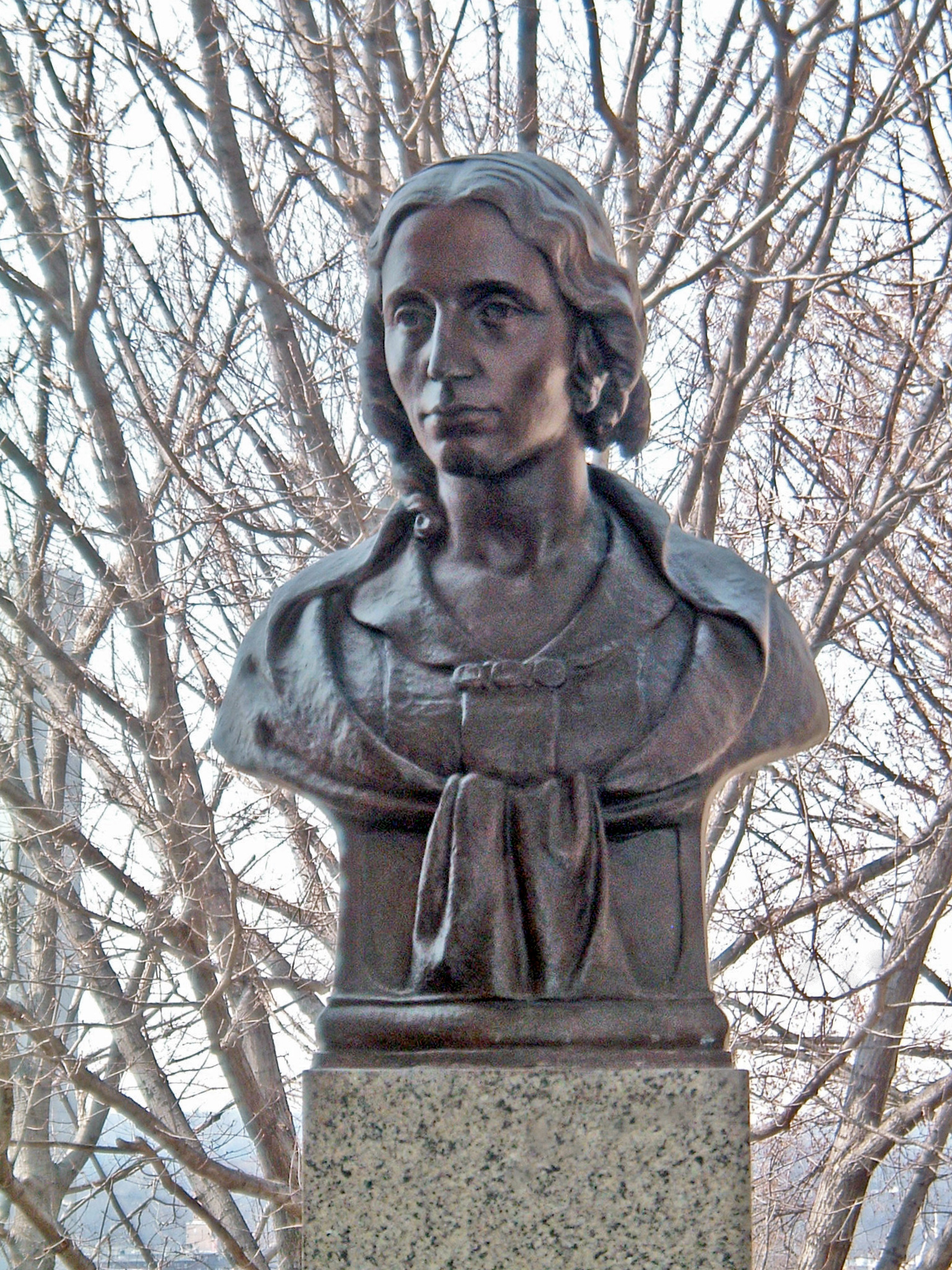
Bust by Brenda Putnam at Hall of Fame for Great Americans

The USPS honored Harriet Beecher Stowe with a 75c postage stamp, issued August 24, 2000

== Selected works ==
=== Books ===
==== Novels ====
- "Uncle Tom's Cabin; or, Life Among the Lowly". The National Era. June 5, 1851. (First two chapters of serialized version which ran for 40 numbers.) (Digitized version of entire series by University of Virginia.)
- Uncle Tom's Cabin, or, Life among the Lowly. Boston & Cleveland: J.P. Jewett; Jewett, Proctor & Worthington. 1852. (Published in 2 volumes; stereotyped by Hobart & Robbins.) (One volume 1853 edition is hosted by HathiTrust.)
- Uncle Tom's Cabin: The Great American Novel, to be completed in six weekly numbers, price one penny each Saturday. London: Vickers. August 7, 1852. (Title from first number.)
- Uncle Tom's Cabin; or, The History of a Christian Slave. London: Partridge and Oakey. 1852. (First English illustrated edition.) (Digital copy hosted by HathiTrust.)
- Dred, A Tale of the Great Dismal Swamp. Boston: Phillips, Sampson. 1856.
- Our Charley and What to do with Him. Boston: Phillips, Sampson. 1858.
- The Minister's Wooing. New York: Derby and Jackson. 1859.
- The Pearl of Orr's Island: A Story of the Coast of Maine. Boston: Ticknor and Fields. 1862. (Ebook available at Project Gutenberg.)
- Agnes of Sorrento. Boston: Ticknor and Fields. 1862. (Digital copy hosted by Archive.org)
- Oldtown Folks. Montreal; London: Dawson; Sampson Low, Son & Marston. 1869. (Digitized version at UPenn Digital Library)
- Little Pussy Willow. Boston: Fields, Osgood. 1870. (1871 printing available at Internet Archive.)
- Pink and White Tyranny; A Society Novel. Boston: Roberts Brothers. 1871. (Ebook available at Project Gutenberg.)
- My Wife and I: or, Harry Henderson's History. Boston; New York: Houghton, Mifflin and Co.; J.B. Ford and Company. 1871. (Digital copy hosted by HathiTrust.)
- Six of One by Half a Dozen of the Other. Boston: Roberts Brothers. 1872. (co-authored with Adeline D.T. Whitney, Lucretia P. Hale, Frederic W. Loring, Frederic B. Perkins and Edward E. Hale.) (Digital copy at Google Books.)
- We and our Neighbors; or, The Records of an Unfashionable Street: A Novel. New York: J.B. Ford & Company. January 10, 1875. [1875]. (Sequel to My wife and I.) (Digital copy hosted by HathiTrust.)

==== Drama ====
- The Christian Slave. A Drama founded on a Portion of Uncle Tom's Cabin. Boston: Phillips, Sampson & Company. 1855. (Closet drama or reading version based on Uncle Tom's Cabin.) (Digital copy hosted by HathiTrust.)

==== Poetry ====
- Religious Poems. Boston: Ticknor and Fields. 1867. (Digital copy hosted by Internet Archive.)

==== Non-fiction ====
- A New England Sketchbook. Lowell [Mass.]: A. Gilman. 1834. (As Harriet E. Beecher.)
- Earthly Care, A Heavenly Discipline. Boston: The American Tract Society. [ca. 1845].
- "A New Year's Dream". The Christian Keepsake, and Missionary Annual, for MDCCCXLIX. n.l.: Brower, Hayes & Co. [1849].
- History of the Edmonson Family. Andover, Mass.: The Author. 1852?. (Self-published book to raise funds to educate Emily and Mary Edmonson, former slaves redeemed by a public subscription in 1848, supported by Stowe.)
- A Key to Uncle Tom's Cabin, presenting the original facts and documents upon which the story is founded together with corroborative statements verifying the truth of the work. Boston, Cleveland, London: John P. Jewett & Co.; Jewett, Proctor & Worthington; Low and Company. 1853.(Digital Copy hosted by HathiTrust.)
- Sunny Memories of Foreign Lands. Boston; New York: Phillips, Sampson, and Company; J.C. Derby. 1854. (Digital copy hosted by HathiTrust: Volume I and Volume II.)
- First Geography for Children. Boston: Philips, Sampson and Co. 1855. (Digital copy hosted by HathiTrust.)
- Stories about our Dogs. Edinburgh: William P. Nimmo. [1865]. (Nimmo's Sixpenny Juvenile Series.) (Digital copy hosted by University of Florida's George A. Smathers Library.)
- House and Home Papers. Boston: Ticknor and Fields. 1865. (Published under the name of Christopher Crowfield.) (Digital copy hosted by Archive.org.)
- Little Foxes. Boston: Ticknor and Fields. 1866. (Published under the name of Christopher Crowfield.) (Digital copy hosted by Archive.org.)
- Men of our Times; or, Leading Patriots of the Day. Being narratives of the lives and deeds of statesmen, generals, and orators. Including biographical sketches and anecdotes of Lincoln, Grant, Garrison, Sumner, Chase, Wilson, Greeley, Farragut, Andrew, Colfax, Stanton, Douglass, Buckingham, Sherman, Sheridan, Howard, Phillips and Beecher. Hartford, Conn.; New York: Hartford Publishing Co.; J.D. Denison. 1868. (Digital copy hosted by HathiTrust.)
- The Chimney Corner. Boston: Ticknor and Fields. 1868. (Published under the name of Christopher Crowfield.) (Digital copy hosted by HathiTrust.)
- The American Woman's Home; or, Principles of Domestic Science being a guide to the formation and maintenance of economical, healthful, beautiful, and Christian homes. New York; Boston: J.B. Ford and Company; H.A. Brown & Co. 1869. (Written with Catherine Beecher.) (Digitized version at MSU Historic American Cookbook Project.) Textbook version: Principles of Domestic Science as Applied to the Duties and Pleasures of Home: A Text-book for the use of Young Ladies in Schools, Seminaries, and Colleges. New York: J.B. Ford and Company. 1870. (Digital copy hosted by Archive.com.)
- Lady Byron Vindicated: A History of the Byron Controversy, from its beginning in 1816 to the present time. Boston: Fields, Osgood, & Co. 1870. (Ebook available at Project Gutenberg.)
- The Lives and Deeds of our Self-Made Men. Hartford, Conn.: Worthington, Dustin. 1872. (Digital copy at Archive.org.)
- Palmetto-Leaves. Boston: J.R. Osgood and Company. 1873. (Digital copy is hosted by Archive.org.)
- Woman in Sacred History: A Series of Sketches Drawn from Scriptural, Historical, and Legendary Sources. New York: J.B. Ford and Company. 1873. (Digital copy of 1874 printing is hosted at Archive.org.)
- Footsteps of the Master. New York: J.B. Ford & Company. 1877. (Digital copy hosted by HathiTrust.)
- Bible Heroines, Being Narrative Biographies of Prominent Hebrew Women in the Patriarchal, National, and Christian Eras, Giving Views of Women in Sacred History, as Revealed in the Light of the Present Day. New York: Fords, Howard, & Hulbert. 1878. (Digital copy hosted by HathiTrust.)
- Poganuc People: Their Loves and Lives. New York: Fords, Howard, & Hulbert. 1878. [1878]. (Digital copy hosted at HathiTrust.)
- A Dog's Mission; or, The Story of the Old Avery House and Other Stories. New York: Fords, Howard, and Hulbert. 1880. (Collection of children's stories consisting of "A Dog's Mission", "Lulu's Pupil", "The Daisy's First Winter", "Our Charley", "Take Care of the Hook", "A Talk about Birds", "The Nest in the Orchard" AND "The Happy Child".) (Digital copy hosted by HathiTrust.)
- He's Coming Tomorrow. Boston: James H. Earle. [published between 1889 and 1883]. (Digital copy of 1901 edition published by Fleming N. Revell hosted by Archive.org.)

==== Collections ====
- The Mayflower; or, Sketches of Scenes and Characters among the Descendants of the Pilgrims. New York: Harper & Brothers. 1843. (Consists of the stories: "Love versus Law", "The Tea-rose", "Trials of a Housekeeper", "Little Edward", "Let Every Man Mind His Own Business", "Cousin William", "Uncle Tim", "Aunt Mary", "Frankness", "The Sabbath", "So many Calls", "The Canal-boat", "Feeling", "The Sempstress", "Old Father Morris". (Digital copy hosted by Archive.org.)
- Uncle Sam's Emancipation; Earthly Care, A Heavenly Discipline; and Other Sketches. Philadelphia: W.P. Hazard. 1853. (Consists of the following sketches: "Account of Mrs. Beecher Stowe and her Family", "Uncle Sam's Emancipation", "Earthly Care, A Heavenly Discipline", "A Scholar's Adventure in the Country", "Children", "The Two Bibles", "Letter from Maine, No. 1", "Letter from Maine, No. 2", "Christmas; or, The Good Fairy".) (Digital copy hosted at HathiTrust.)
- Evergreen: Being the Smaller Works of Mrs. H. Beecher Stowe. Belfast: Alex. S. Mayne. 1853. (A collection of works consisting of: "The New Year's Gift", "The Bible, The Source of Sure Comfort", "Make to Yourselves Driends", "Earthly Care, A Heavenly Discipline", "So Many Calls", "Learn of Children", "Anti-slavery Meeting in Glasgow, Letter from Mrs. Stowe to Dr Wardlaw".)
- Queer Little People. Boston: Ticknor and Fields. 1868. (Published under the name of Christopher Crowfield.) (Digital copy hosted by HathiTrust.) (Consists of the following stories: "The Hen That Hatched Ducks", "The Nutcracker of Nutcracker Lodge", "The History of Tip-Top", "Miss Katy-Did and Miss Cricket", "Mother Magpie's Micschief", "The Squirrels that Live in a House", "Hum, the Son of Buz", "Our Country Neighbors", "Our Dogs", "Dogs and Cats", "Aunt Esther's Rules", "Aunt Esther's Stories", "Sir Walter Scott and his Dogs" and "Country Neighbors Again".)
- Oldtown Fireside Stories. Boston: J.R. Osgood. 1872. (Digital copy hosted by HathiTrust.) (Consists of the stories: "The Ghost in the Mill", "The Sullivan Looking-Glass", "The Minister's Housekeeper", "The Widow's Bandbox", "Captain Kidd's Money", "'Mis' Elderkin's Pitcher'", "The Ghost in the Cap'n Brownhouse".)
- Betty's Bright Idea [and Other Stories]. New York: J.B. Ford & Company. 1876. (In addition to the title story, the book includes "Deacon Pitkin's Farm" and "The First Christmas of New England".) (Digital copy hosted by HathiTrust.)
- Sam Lawson's Oldtown Fireside Stories. Boston; New York: Houghton, Mifflin and Company. 1887. (Digital copy hosted by HathiTrust.) (Consists of: "The Ghost in the Mill", "The Sullivan Looking-Glass", "The Minister's Housekeeper", "The Widow's Bandbox", "Captain Kidd's Money", "'Mis' Elderkin's pitcher'", "The Ghost in the Cap'n Brown House", "Colonel Eph's Shoebuckles", "The Bull-Fight", "How to Fight the Devil", "Laughin' in Meetin'", "Tom Toothacre's Ghost Story", "The Parson's Horse-Race", "Oldtown Fireside Talks of the Revolution" and "A Student's Sea Story".)

=== Stories and articles ===
- "Cousin William". The Boston Weekly Magazine. 1 (3): 19. September 22, 1838.
- "Old Father Morris". Lady's Book: 145. October 1838.
- "Flower Gathering". Southern Rose. 7 (4): 60. October 13, 1838.
- "Trials of a Housekeeper". Godey's Lady's Book. XVIII: 4. January 1839.
- "Stealing Peaches". Episcopal Recorder. 16 (43): 172. January 19, 1839.
- "Olympiana". Lady's Book: 241. June 1839.
- "The Drunkard Reclaimed (I)". New York Evangelist. 10 (48): 1. November 30, 1839. and "The Drunkard Reclaimed (II)". New York Evangelist. 10 (40): 1. December 7, 1839.
- "Art and Nature". Lady's Book: 241. December 1839.
- "Mark Meriden" in E. Leslie, ed. (1841). Mr. and Mrs. Woodbridge with Other Tales. Providence, R.I.: Isaac H. Cady. p. 129. (Digital copy hosted by HathiTrust.)
- "The Tea Rose". Godey's Lady's Book. 24 (3): 145. March 1842.
- "The Dancing School (I)". New York Evangelist. 14 (14): 1. April 6, 1843. and "The Dancing School (II)". New York Evangelist. 14 (14): 1. April 13, 1843.
- "The Family Circle". Christian Reflector. 6 (19). May 10, 1843.
- "Feeling". New York Evangelist. 14 (16): 1. April 20, 1843.
- "Now we see through a glass darkly". New York Evangelist. 14 (23): 1. June 8, 1843.
- "The Bashful Cousin". Philanthropist. 7 (44): 4. July 12, 1843.
- "So Many Calls". Ladies Repository, and Gatherings of the West. 3: 278. September 1843.
- "The Nursery (I)". The Youth's Companion. 17 (25): 98. October 26, 1843. and "The Nursery (II)". The Youth's Companion. 17 (26): 102. November 2, 1843.
- "Which is the Liberal Man?". New York Evangelist. 15 (5): 1. February 1, 1844.
- "Moralist and Miscellanist". Christian Reflector. 7 (6): 24. February 8, 1844.
- "Mark Meriden". The Rover. 3 (24): 376. August 7, 1844.
- "Tales and Sketches of Real Life". Littell's Living Age. 2 (18): 339. September 14, 1844.
- "Mary at the Cross". New York Evangelist. 15 (48): 192. November 28, 1844.
- "Love and Fear". New York Evangelist. 15 (49): 196. December 5, 1844.
- "Immediate Emancipation – A Sketch". The Cincinnati Weekly Herald and Philanthropist. 9 (21): 2. February 5, 1845.
- "Ladies' Department". Massachusetts Ploughman and New England Journal of Agriculture. 4 (24): 4. March 15, 1845.
- "Narrative". The Youth's Companion. 18 (48): 190. April 3, 1845.
- "Slavery". Zion's Herald and Wesleyan Journal. 16 (15): 60. April 9, 1845.
- "The Interior or Hidden Life". New York Evangelist. 16 (16): 1. April 17, 1845..
- "Uncle Abel and Little Edatrd". Zion's Herald and Wesleyan Journal. 16 (21): 1. May 21, 1845..
- "A Tradition of the Church of Laodicea". Episcopal Recorder. 23 (28): 109. September 27, 1845.
- "Children". New York Evangelist. 17 (3): 1. January 15, 1846.
- "What will the American People do? (I)". New York Evangelist. 17 (5): 1. January 29, 1846. and "What will the American People do? (II)". New York Evangelist. 17 (6): 1. February 5, 1846.
- "Parents and Children". The New York Observer and Chronicle. 24 (32): 128. August 8, 1946.
- "The Way to Live on Christ". Christian Watchman. 28 (2): 1. January 8, 1847.
- "Feelings". Godey's Magazine and Lady's Book. 36: 102. February 1848.
- "The Coral Ring". Godey's Magazine and Lady's Book. 36: 340. June 1848.
- "Moral Tales (I)". The Youth's Companion. 22 (20): 77. September 14, 1848. and "Moral Tales (II)". The Youth's Companion. 22 (21): 81. September 21, 1848.
- "Atonement – A Historical Reverie". New York Evangelist. 19 (52): 1. December 28, 1948.
- "A Little Child Shall Lead Them". Christian Parlor Magazine: 248. May 1, 1850.
- "The Freeman's Dream: A Parable". National Era. IV (31): 121. August 1, 1850.
- "Earthly Care a Heavenly Discipline". New York Evangelist. 21 (1): 1. August 1, 1850.
- "Heinrich Stilling". New York Evangelist. 22 (6): 1. February 6, 1851.
- "The Two Altars; or, Two Pictures in One (I)". New York Evangelist. 22 (24): 1. June 12, 1851. and "The Two Altars; or, Two Pictures in One (II)". New York Evangelist. 22 (25): 1. June 19, 1851. (Reprinted in a collection of leading abolitionists with facsimile signatures of the authors: Autographs for Freedom. London: Sampson Low, Son & Co.; and John Cassell. 1853. p. 88. Digitised by Archive.org.)
- "A Reply". The Atlantic Monthly. 11: 120. January 1863. "A Reply" is reprinted in Masur (1993), pp. 239-245, and discussed in Oakes (2014), pp. 166-176. A "Rejoinder" to it was published in London in 1863.
- "The True Story of Lady Byron's Life". The Atlantic Monthly. 24: 295. September 1869.
- "The Modern Martyrdom of St. Perpetua". The Atlantic Monthly. February 1879.
- "Our Florida Plantation". The Atlantic Monthly. May 1879.

== See also ==
- Origins of the American Civil War
