= Samuel Eells =

American philosopher and orator (1810–1842)

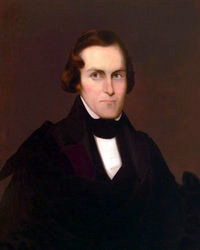
- Born: May 18, 1810; Westmoreland, New York, U.S.
- Died: March 13, 1842 (aged 31); Cincinnati, Ohio, U.S.
- Burial place: Woodland Cemetery (Cleveland)
- Education: Hamilton College
- Occupations: Lawyer, philosopher, and orator
- Known for: Founding Alpha Delta Phi

Samuel Eells (May 18, 1810– March 13, 1842) was a 19th-century American lawyer, philosopher and orator who founded the Alpha Delta Phi fraternity in 1832 at Hamilton College in Clinton, New York.

== Early life and education ==
Eells was born in Westmoreland, New York, in the rural western part of the state, on May 18, 1810. He could trace his family back to early settlers of the Massachusetts Bay Colony, and his father, James Eells was a Congregationalist missionary who worked amongst the Native Americans in Western New York. Eells was the third child of seven in his family.

In 1826, he began studies at Clinton Academy.

Eells' constitution was feeble, and through all of his short life he struggled with tuberculosis and possibly other illnesses. Nevertheless, he was known amongst his friends and colleagues for his intense intellectual curiosity, drive, and "personal magnetism." Eells was praised for his writing and oration.

== Founding of Alpha Delta Phi ==
Samuel Eells studied at Hamilton College beginning in 1827 but illness forced him to withdraw due to health reasons. In order to improve his health, he traveled mostly on foot from the college to New Haven, Connecticut. From there he traveled on a sloop to Norfolk, Virginia. Once there, he sailed back to New York City and then on to New England, Nova Scotia and Newfoundland and back to Bedford, Massachusetts, paying for his passage by fishing.

He returned to Hamilton College in late 1828 and studied there until 1832. There he studied under John Hiram Lathrop, later the first president of both the University of Missouri and the University of Wisconsin.

At the time, the college was nearly bankrupt due to mismanagement, and the student body was torn apart by rivalries between underground debating and literary societies, primarily the Phoenix and the Philopeuthian. College life at the time was intensely supervised and instruction was rigidly traditionalist. Eells saw the virtue of the debating societies as a haven for free thought, association and intellectual cultivation, yet he deplored their vicious competition for members and social dominance.

In January 1832, Eells gathered five students to form a new society, Alpha Delta Phi, which would cultivate intellectual debate and development in the manner of the existing literary societies, but put aside their social competitiveness. It would seek to develop the "entire man," "moral, social and intellectual," and create a community of caring and brotherhood. In writing the constitution and "ideals" for Alpha Delta Phi, Eells and his cohorts drew on the previously existing debate and literary societies, the few previously existing Greek-letter fraternities such as Sigma Phi and Kappa Alpha, and liberal Protestant philosophy.

Eels was named valedictorian of his class at Hamilton, but due to an outbreak of cholera, was unable to give a public speech.

== Legal career ==
After graduating from Hamilton, Eells moved to Ohio, where his father had already gone in the intervening years. On the way, he had a nearly fatal bout with cholera, but surprised nearly everyone by surviving and recovering.

Once in Ohio, he supported himself by teaching at a small school that he founded himself. He also founded chapters of Alpha Delta Phi at Miami University in October 1833 and Case Western Reserve University in July 1841. He also attended conventions of the Alpha Delta Phi in 1839 in New Haven, Connecticut and New York City in 1841.

He read law on his own in Springfield, passed the Ohio bar exam, and in February 1835, began practicing on his own in Cincinnati. He prided himself on taking pro bono cases for poor or unpopular clients, and built enough of a reputation for himself that he was taken on as a partner by Salmon P. Chase; Chase would go on to become a leading abolitionist and Chief Justice of the Supreme Court.

In March 1837, Chase and Eells filed a writ of habeas corpus on behaf of Matilda, a 20-year-old woman whose father, Missouri planter Larkin Lawrence, claimed to own her as his slave.

== Philosophy ==
Eells delivered speeches, especially to meetings of religious and philanthropic organizations, some of which were subsequently reprinted and preserved.

His speeches and essays were fervently religious and showed a progressive, optimistic philosophy. He spoke on the value of liberal education, including the study of art and the Classics, on history, and occasionally on controversial social topics. Several of these writings and speeches can be found in the "Memorial of Samuel Eells," collected by his nephew James Eells in 1873. The three most notable speeches are as follows:

=== Miami University of Ohio chapter of Alpha Delta Phi, 1836 ===
He gave his first published speech before the Miami University of Ohio chapter of Alpha Delta Phi in September 1836.

=== College of Teachers in Cincinnati, 1838 ===
This speech was given to the College of Teachers in Cincinnati in October 1838.

=== Address to the Biennial Convention of Alpha Delta Phi, 1839 ===
A version of the speech was first given in July 1839 for the degree of Master of Arts, and then on August 15, 1839, to the attendees of the Alpha Delta Phi convention. Probably his most noteworthy work, "Address to the Biennial Convention of Alpha Delta Phi: On the Law and Means of Social Advancement," was published that same year.

In the speech, Eells argues that the general law of human history is progress. Each successive phase of human history brings greater fellowship amongst all humanity and freedom for the individual soul. Although tyranny and suffering may prevail in certain places and times, truth and freedom will always overcome them in the long run. Absolute perfection may never be achieved, but human society will always be pushed forward towards true freedom. He asserts that only spiritual and philosophical change—not material advancement or political reform—can lead to real progress; he cites the mistreatment of the Native Americans as proof that democratic government and law are not enough in themselves to preclude tyranny. Rather, Eells believes that the spread of Christianity around the world will help begin a new era of equality, justice and peace.

Eells cites Francis Bacon, Johannes Kepler, Isaac Newton, Muhammad and Martin Luther as examples of noble reformers.

One must remember that he was raised on a very liberal, humanistic strain of early-nineteenth-century Protestantism. His philosophy is influenced by his family's Congregationalism. At that time, it was connected to a radical counterculture that was overthrowing conservative beliefs in the continuous decline of humanity.

== Last years ==
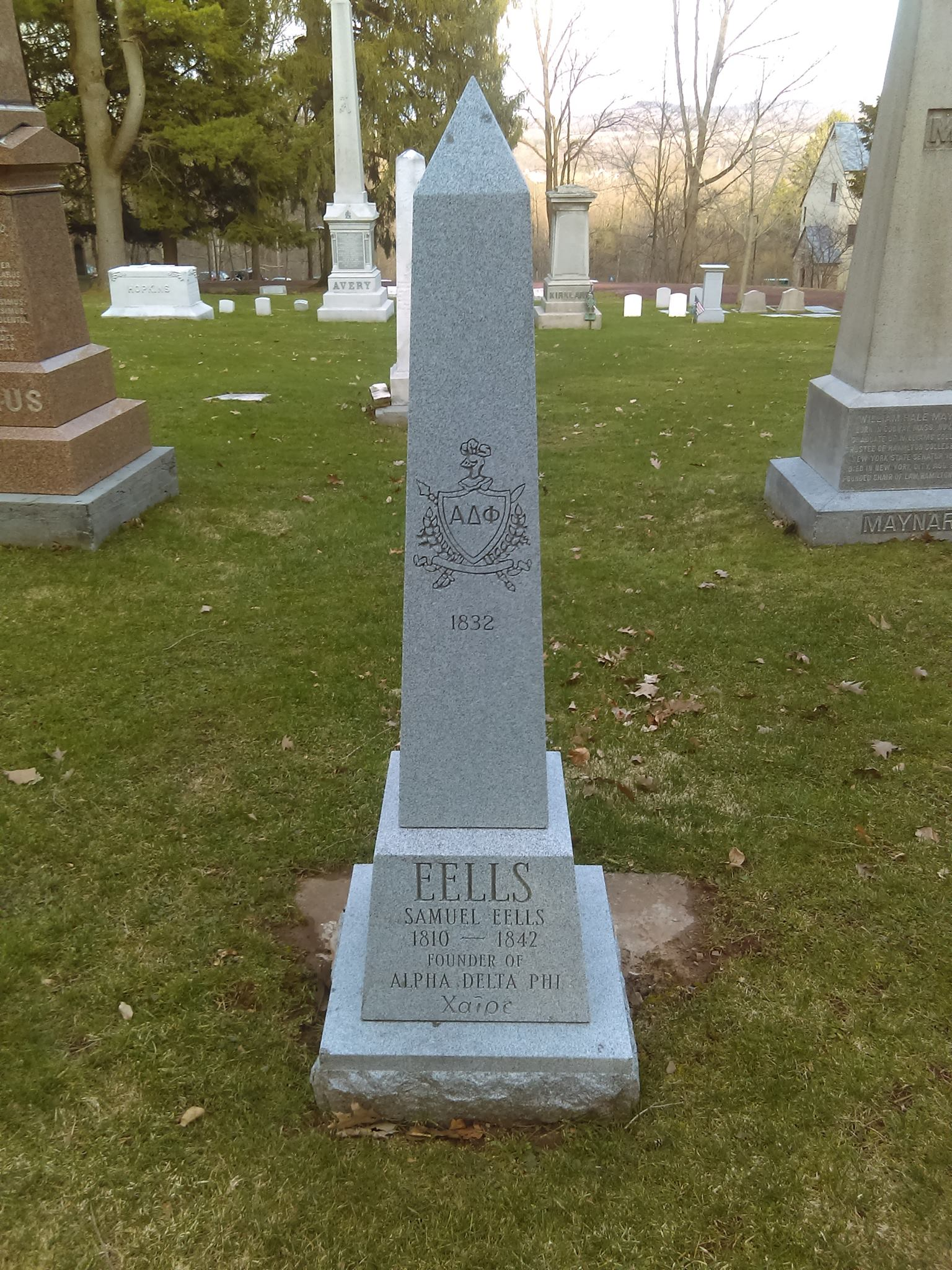
Samuel Eells Monument at the Hamilton College Cemetery. Installed upon his reburial there in 1999.

After his partnership with Salmon P. Chase, Eells endeavored to practice law on his own again. This did not last very long, because, as had long been expected, his health began to fall apart. Eells tried several tactics to try to recover his health, such as spending the winter of 1840 in Cuba, but nevertheless, he died on March 13, 1842, in Cincinnati at the home of his friend S. W. Pomeroy, wracked with arthritis and tuberculosis.

Samuel Eells was buried in Cincinnati when in 1859 his body was moved to the Eells family plot in Woodland Cemetery in Cleveland, Ohio. In 1929, his remains were moved to the Alpha Delta Phi fraternity house at Hamilton College, where "for a long time they were kept in a vault under the floorboards of the 'goat room.'" Eells was buried for the third time in the college cemetery in 1999.

== Legacy ==
Though noteworthy in their time, Eells' works are not widely read today and are treated mostly as historical artifacts.

Alpha Delta Phi, however, still exists divided into two branches—the Society, with eleven undergraduate chapters as of 2026, and the all-male Fraternity, with 30 chapters in the United States and 3 in Canada.

Alpha Delta Phi was the second Greek-letter fraternity at Hamilton College, behind Sigma Phi, and as it founded more chapters, it also became the first fraternity at Harvard, Brown University, and several other institutions. When it founded a chapter at Miami University in Ohio, it became the first Greek-letter fraternity west of the Alleghenies, and the first anywhere outside of New York and New England.
