= College of Teachers (Cincinnati) =

The College of Teachers, a Western enlightenment group, was formed in 1830 by a group of teachers and other citizens of Cincinnati, Ohio. Alexander Hamilton McGuffey and Calvin Ellis Stowe were key members of the group. It evolved from two earlier groups, "Western Literary Institute and College of Professional Teachers" and "Western Literary Institute and Board of Education". It embraced development of common schools and the movement led to the creation of the McGuffey Readers.

== See also ==
- American Enlightenment
