= John Andrew Jackson =

American slave and abolitionist

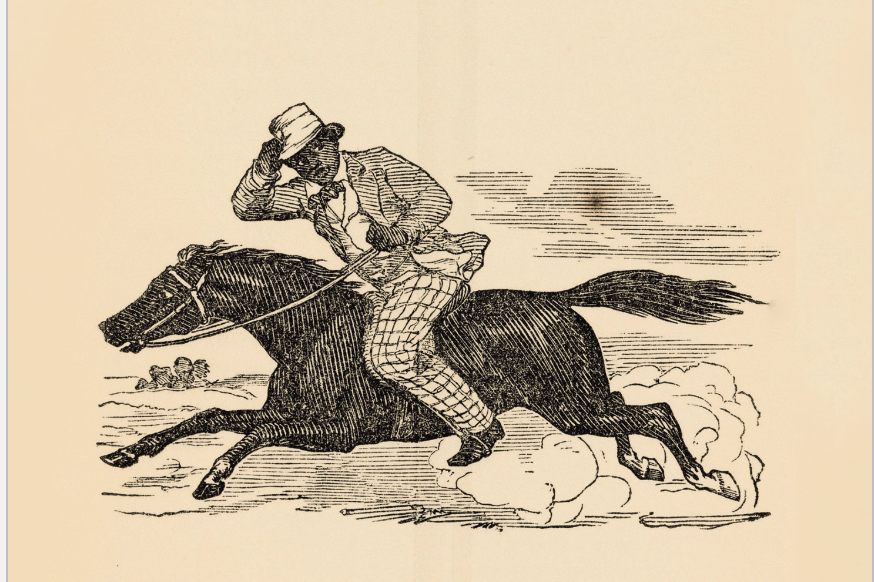
John Andrew Jackson Cover art from John Andrew Jackson's 1862 memoir depicting him on horseback.

John Andrew Jackson was an American abolitionist and orator in the nineteenth century. He was born into slavery on the English family's plantation in Lynchburg, South Carolina. His escape north to Canada may have been one of many slave experiences that inspired Harriet Beecher Stowe's Uncle Tom's Cabin. During the American Civil War, Jackson published The Experience of a Slave in South Carolina (1862) while in Great Britain.

== Family ==
Jackson was born to Doctor and Betty Clavern in 1825. Jackson had 10 siblings, although 2 died during childhood.

Around 1843, Jackson unofficially married Louisa, an enslaved woman from a nearby plantation. They had two children together, one of whom was a daughter named Jinny. He was prohibited from visiting his wife and children, but would often sneak out to be with his family. Jackson was whipped and punished but continued to visit his wife and children. The pair were forced to separate when Louisa's master moved to Georgia, taking Louisa and Jinny.

Jackson escaped in 1846, but was not reunited with Louisa and Jinny. After arriving in Canada, he married Julia Watson, another freedom-seeking fugitive.

Later, Jackson married for the third time and had two more children.

== Escape ==
As a child, the idea of freedom became more important to Jackson. One day, he bought a pony from one of the slaves on a neighboring plantation. When the mistress found out, she threatened to have the pony killed. Hearing of the mistress's plan, Jackson hid the pony until Christmas. On Christmas Day, Jackson took his pony and escaped from his plantation, never to see his parents again. As he rode to Boston, Jackson met many white people who asked where he was going. Jackson would respond by saying that he was on his way to his plantation. Eventually, he arrived at the Santee River where he boarded a small ship run by a black man. Jackson and his pony were dropped near land but had to struggle upstream to reach it. After almost drowning, Jackson and his pony made it to shore.

Jackson learned about the badge that all African Americans had to produce to prove they were allowed to be free. Not having a badge, he sold his pony to buy a cloak to hide from patrolmen. The cloak worked to his advantage until he was able to find a ship to Boston. He tried to board but the crewmen refused, afraid that he was working for a white man and trying to set them up. Jackson hid in a box that was loaded onto the ship's hold. Eventually, the crewmen found him and threatened to unload him on the next ship. Luckily for Jackson, they did not encounter another ship and he made it to Boston safely.

From Boston, Jackson went on to settle in Salem, Massachusetts. Once settled, he sought to purchase his family members still enslaved. He sent a letter to inquire about his family; shortly after it was received, a slave agent was sent to search for him. Jackson avoided capture and was assisted by Harriet Beecher Stowe, who gave him food, clothes, and five dollars. He later left Salem for Canada.

== Freedom ==
In Salem, Jackson was free but not safe. He worked as a leather tanner and part-time sawmill operator until the passage of the Fugitive Slave Law. Afraid of being recaptured, Jackson then escaped across the border to Canada.

Once in Canada, John Andrew settled in Saint John, New Brunswick. He legally remarried and had more children.

Still seeking to purchase his enslaved family members, he journeyed to Great Britain with his wife to solicit contributions. He lectured in Scotland and England with several others, including David Guthrie, Rev. Thomas Candlish, and Julia Griffiths.

John Andrew and his wife lived in London, England until after the American Civil War ended. Eventually, they returned to live in Springfield, Massachusetts. He travelled back and forth to South Carolina for many years trying to help the freedmen of Sumter County.
