= Calvin Ellis Stowe =

American Biblical scholar (1802–1886)

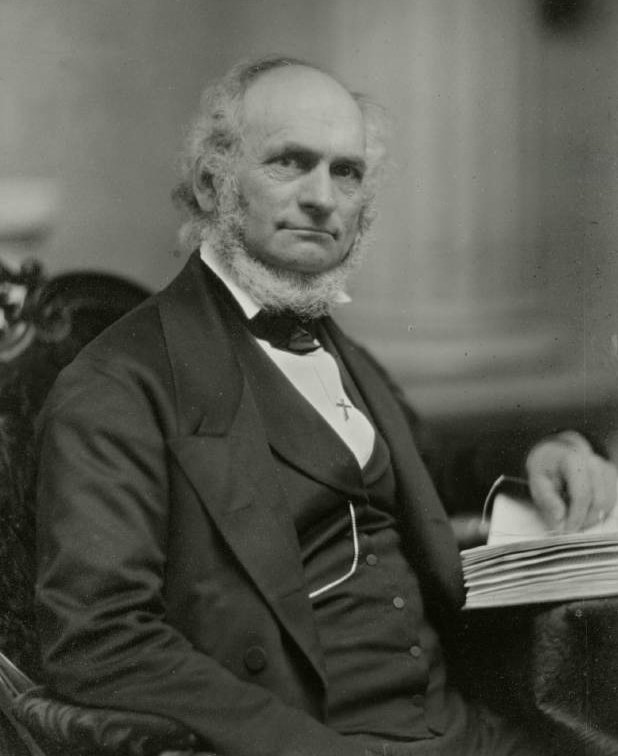
- c. 1850
- Born: Calvin Ellis Stow (Note: Stowe spelled his name "Stow" until he graduated from college.); April 6, 1802; South Natick, Massachusetts, US
- Died: August 22, 1886 (aged 84); Hartford, Connecticut, US
- Occupations: Biblical scholar, clergyman, literary agent, public education advocate
- Spouses: Eliza Tyler (m. 1832; died 1834) Harriet Beecher (m. 1836)
- Relatives: Bennet Tyler (1st father-in-law); Lyman Beecher (2nd father-in-law)

Calvin Ellis Stowe (April 6, 1802 – August 22, 1886) was an American Biblical scholar who helped spread public education in the United States. Over his career, he was a professor of languages and Biblical and sacred literature at Andover Theological Seminary, Dartmouth College, Lane Theological Seminary, and Bowdoin College. He was the husband and literary agent of Harriet Beecher Stowe, author of the best-seller Uncle Tom's Cabin.

== Early life and education ==
Coat of Arms of Calvin Ellis Stowe

Stowe was born in South Natick, Massachusetts. His father, a village baker, died due to an accident in 1808. He left an impoverished widow with two sons. Stowe was sent to his maternal grandparents to live. At the age of twelve, Stowe was apprenticed to a paper maker. Stowe had an insatiable craving for books, and acquired the rudiments of Latin by studying at odd moments during his apprenticeship in the paper mill. He saved enough money to pay for a year at Bradford Academy in 1818.

His earnest desire and determined efforts to gain an education attracted the attention of benefactors who sent him to an academy in Gorham, Maine, in 1819 or 1820. He entered Bowdoin College and in 1821 Stowe became a member of the Peucinian literary society which had a collection of 600 to 700 titles. He became secretary of the society in 1822. After donations of several hundred books, Stowe became a paid librarian for the school in 1824. He graduated with honors in 1824. President Franklin Pierce was a classmate, who said that he benefited by sitting next to Stowe when taking tests. Henry Wadsworth Longfellow and Nathaniel Hawthorne's class was one year behind Stowe's.

After his graduation from Bowdoin, he remained there for a year as an instructor and librarian. In September 1825, he entered Andover Theological Seminary. For his continued scholastic studies, he received his master's degree from Bowdoin in 1827. At the instigation of Moses Stuart, a professor at Andover, he completed a scholarly translation of Jahn's Hebrew Commonwealth. He graduated in 1828. He was proficient in the Greek, Latin, Hebrew and Arabic languages.

== Career ==
=== Editor and translator ===
In 1829, he became editor of the Boston Recorder, the oldest religious newspaper in the United States. He published a translation from the Latin, with notes, of Lowth's Lectures on the Sacred Poetry of the Hebrews.

=== Educator and librarian ===
In 1830, he was appointed professor of Greek at Dartmouth College. He was a popular professor and Dartmouth awarded him an honorary master's degree for his continued scholarship. Two years later, he was appointed professor of Biblical Literature at the Lane Theological Seminary in Cincinnati. He was also the librarian, responsible for building what grew to a collection of 10,000 volumes by 1837, some of which were acquired during a book-buying trip to Europe in May 1836. Based upon a study of American academic libraries published in 1840, the Lane had the largest academic library west of the Alleghenies at that time.

Lyman Beecher was the president of the seminary; Stowe was mocked in the press for being Beecher's "satellite". He taught religion at Bowdoin from 1850 to 1852 and at Andover Theological Seminary from 1852 to 1864.

=== Education advocate ===
While in Cincinnati, Stowe became an important advocate for the development of public schools. He believed that students required good elementary education for successful secondary education, with particular attention to schools in what was then the Western United States (between the Appalachians and the Mississippi). Without neglecting his professional duties, he devoted himself heart and soul to this work. In May 1836, he sailed for England, primarily to purchase a library for Lane seminary, but he received at the same time an official appointment from the Ohio State Legislature to visit as agent the public schools of Europe, particularly those of Prussia. On his return he published his Report on Elementary Education in Europe, which urged Ohio to adopt a state-backed educational system like that of German states. The Legislature ordered a copy of the book for each of the state's school districts.

He was co-founder with Alexander Hamilton McGuffey in the establishment of the College of Teachers there in 1833.

=== Author ===
Stowe contributed to religious periodicals over his career. His first book, published while he was Professor of Biblical Literature at the Lane Seminary, was Introduction to the criticism and interpretation of the Bible : designed for the use of theological students, Bible classes, and high schools. After Harriet's novel became famous, Stowe wrote his own best-selling book, Origin and History of the Books of the Bible, both Canonical and Apocryphal (Hartford, 1867). He also published The Religious Element in Education, a lecture (1844); and The Right Interpretation of the Sacred Scriptures, inaugural address (Andover, 1853).

== Personal life ==
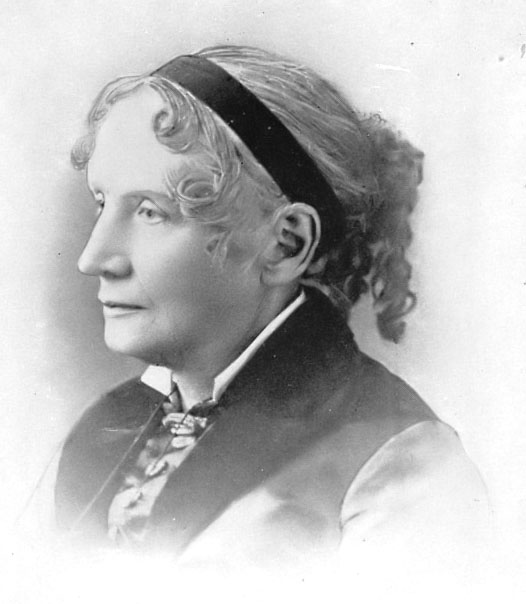
Harriet Beecher Stowe

In 1832, he married Eliza Tyler of Portland Maine. Her father was Rev. Bennet Tyler, who was a president of Dartmouth. They moved to Walnut Hills, Cincinnati, Ohio. Eliza died on August 26, 1834. Eliza was a good friend of Harriet Elizabeth Beecher. In January 1836, he married Harriet. Her father was Dr. Lyman Beecher, president of Lane Theological Seminary. They lived in Cincinnati after their marriage and moved to Brunswick, Maine, in 1850, during a period of unrest due to the Fugitive Slave Act of 1850. The family moved to Andover, Massachusetts in 1852, the final move for Stowe's career.

In 1864, owing to failing health and increasing infirmities, he resigned his professorship and moved to Hartford, Connecticut. He was elected a member of the American Antiquarian Society in 1865. Harriet wrote her acclaimed novel, Uncle Tom's Cabin (1852). In 1853 and 1856, he visited Europe with Harriet. His childhood stories served as the basis for Harriet's books Oldtown Folks (1869) and Sam Lawson's Old Fireside Stories (1872).

They had a winter house in Florida along the St. Johns River. It sat on a 90-acre property orange grove. Following months of ill health, Stowe died on August 22, 1886, in Hartford, Connecticut.

=== The Underground Railroad ===
While in Cincinnati, the Stowes provided shelter for northward-bound freedom seekers on the Underground Railroad and Harriet's brothers and Stowe helped them on their journey to Canada. Cincinnati riots of 1836 sent angry mobs, led by the agents of exasperated and desperate slave-holders, to hunt down free blacks in the streets of Cincinnati.

As references in William Lloyd Garrison's radical abolitionist paper, The Liberator, document, although Stowe privately decried slavery, he was no abolitionist. He believed slavery was sanctioned by the Bible and that, through Christian education, slavery would gradually fade away. He was, instead, an advocate of colonization of free Blacks in Liberia as a "solution" to slavery. It was only after his wife Harriet Beecher Stowe's Uncle Tom's Cabin was published in 1852 that Stowe began, haltingly, to change his stance regarding slavery, first as a signatory to a petition of New England clergy in opposition to the Kansas–Nebraska Act, issued in 1854.

== Sources ==
- Hilgert, Earle (1980). "Calvin Ellis Stowe: Pioneer Librarian of the Old West". The Library Quarterly: Information, Community, Policy. 50 (3): 324–351. doi:10.1086/600991. ISSN 0024-2519. JSTOR 4307247. S2CID 145314486.
