= Sigma Pi (literary society) =

Male literary society at Illinois College

- ΣΠ
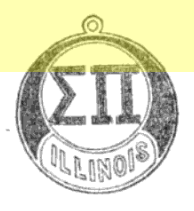
- Sigma Pi badge or watch fob, 1862
- Founded: June 24, 1843; 183 years ago Illinois College
- Type: Literary
- Affiliation: Independent
- Status: Active
- Scope: Local
- Motto: "Let there be light"
- Colors: Black and Gold
- Chapters: 1
- Nickname: Sigs
- Headquarters: Beecher Hall; Illinois College; 1101 W College Avenue; Jacksonville, Illinois 62650; United States

Sigma Pi (ΣΠ) is one of the four male literary societies of Illinois College. It is the oldest literary society at Illinois College and one of the oldest literary societies in the United States, having been founded on Saturday, June 24, 1843. Sigma Pi is headquartered in Beecher Hall, the oldest college building in Illinois. William Jennings Bryan, a three-time presidential nominee, is one of its most distinguished members.

== History ==
In 1842, Samuel Willard and Henry Wing had the idea of creating a society to discuss philosophy and theology at Illinois College in Jacksonville, Illinois where they were students and roommates. They convened a meeting with twelve students in Wing's room (room 32) in Old College Building and presented their idea. On June 24, 1843 the founders met again in Wing's room and approved a constitution. This resulted in the creation of Sigma Pi, the first permanent literary society at Illinois College.

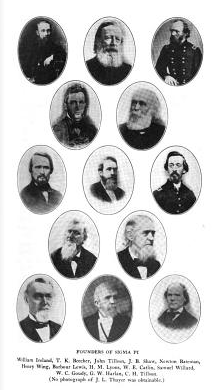
Founders of Sigma Pi

The fourteen founders of Sigma Pi were:

- Newton Bateman
- Thomas K. Beecher
- William E. Catlin
- William C. Goudy
- George W. Harlan
- William Ireland
- Barbour Lewis
- Henry M. Lyons
- John B. Shaw
- Joseph L. Thayer
- Charles H. Tillson
- John Tillson
- Samuel Willard
- Henry Wing

The purpose of the Sigma Pi Literary Society is concisely stated in its constitution. "The purpose of the society shall be the attainment of truth, and the advancement of its members in literary and scientific pursuits." Tillson was elected its first president.

Initially, the society's existence was kept secret. The society held its first literary event on November 12, 1843, in the recitation room of Old Beecher Hall. However, some of the founders were never active student members because they had graduated before the June organizational meeting, including Beecher, Bateman, and Willard.

The literary society was nameless until the fall of 1844, Henry M. Lewis suggested calling the group "Union and Progress"; Willard selected the name Sigma Pi and the corresponding Greek Words, Sustasis kai Prokape. Wing suggested that the society adopt the Hebrew sentence from Genesis: "Let there be light" as its motto.

The early members of Sigma Pi engaged in literary works, debate, and oratory. From its founding, the society was involved in abolitionist work and may have assisted escaped enslaved people. Its debates were mostly centered on the politics of the era, with an emphasis on debating style and persuasion.

From its creation, Sigma Pi was characterized by a restrictive membership and a slight element of secrecy". It was "considered highly exclusive" and its membership was through invitation, following the tradition of Eastern colleges. This intensified its rivalry with Pi Alpha, another campus literary society that included many members who had been denied admission to Sigma Pi. Their rivalry was perceived as "the exclusives against the liberals".

The college gave Sigma Pi quarters on the second (upper) floor of Beecher Hall in 1856. This included a "well furnished" vestibule, meeting room, and library. By 1870, the society had a sizeable library of some 1,500 volumes, including biographies, Congressional records, dictionaries, dramas, encyclopedias, essays, history, magazines, novels, poetry, religion, science, theology, and travel. It also had initiated 500 members.

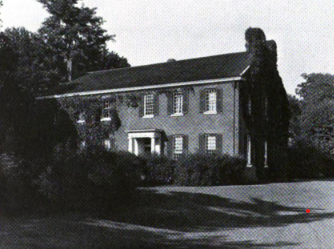
Beecher House, c. 1928

The society's meetings were initially closed but later became open to non-members. In 1874, Sigma Pi and other campus literary societies began to participate in intercollegiate debates. When Illinois College admitted women in 1903, the society invited female students to its meetings, turning this into a social event. However, Sigma Pi remained an organization for male students.

Pi Sigma is still housed in Beecher Hall. Although it retains its identity as a literary society, it has become an unofficial social fraternity by the later 1990s, known for hosting parties in Beecher Hall. At the time, academic Becky Bradway-Hesse called it "the strongest, most active, and most elite society at Illinois College". It strives to develop the social, communication, and leadership skills of the membership. Its sister organization is Sigma Pi Epsilon Literary Society.

== Symbols ==
The society's Greek letter name ΣΠ is an acronym of the Greek phrase Sustasis kai Prokape or "Union and Progress". Its nickname is Sigs. Its colors are black and gold. Its motto is "Let there be light". The society never had passwords and secret handshakes.

== Activities ==
Sigma Pi assembles three judged literary productions each semester where society members make a presentation to an audience. The society conducts weekly business meetings, which are conducted using Robert's Rules of Order. These meetings direct the everyday operations of Sigma Pi. The society's members also complete community service activities.

== Controversies and misconduct ==
=== Sigma Pi fraternity ===
In 1908, Robert George Patterson, president of the national Sigma Pi fraternity, distributed a short history claiming that Sigma Pi Literary Society was its Epsilon chapter. At the time, the fraternity expanding and Patterson wanted it to be the largest and oldest group of its kind in the nation; the literary society also provided a potential link to Patterson's hero William Jennings Bryan who was a member of the society. Patterson's history reported on a meeting with Bryan on February 8, 1908, to "exchange greetings and hope for the future prosperity of the fraternity".

When others disputed the connection between the fraternity and the society. Bryan responded that he met with representatives of the fraternity in Columbus, Ohio after receiving a communication from the fraternity indicating that he was now its member, due to the merger of the two groups. Bryan found the fraternity's members agreeable but did not research the matter. The society's secretary, Warren Case Jr., wrote Bryan, stating:

The fraternity claims to have affiliated with the Sigma Pi society of Illinois College and is using the history of that society to add more lustre to its own name. The fraternity has also had occasion to publish in several fraternity magazines the enclosed articles in which your [Bryan's] name is mentioned as being its most prominent member. If they use your name as a member...such use is fraudulent, for Sigma Pi society is not and has never been connected with Sigma Pi fraternity.

William Raimond Baird, editor and publisher of Baird's Manual of American College Fraternities, wrote Illinois College to verify the literary society's continued standing as a local group. As a result of his findings, Baird rejected Patterson's submission for Sigma Pi fraternity for Baird's Manual, 7th edition. Baird wrote article stating that Sigma Pi fraternity's claim of "alleged antiquity" was "incredible" and "ridiculous". After embarrassing the fraternity on a national level, Patterson was expelled from the fraternity for his role in the fraud.

=== Hazing incidents ===
In the 1960s, Sigma Pi was open about its practice of hazing of new members, as documented in yearbook photos showing pledges covered in mustard and ketchup. In 2016, the society was placed on probation for three years for hazing during new member orientation in the fall of 2015. The pledge master and president were criminally charged with hazing, had to resign from their offices, and were moved to inactive status.

== Notable members ==
- Newton Bateman, Illinois Superintendent of Public Instruction and president of Knox College
- Thomas K. Beecher, minister
- William Jennings Bryan, United States Secretary of State, U.S. House of Representatives, and presidential candidate
- William C. Goudy, Illinois Senate
- Barbour Lewis, United States House of Representatives
- John Wesley Powell, 2nd director of the United States Geological Survey, conducted first government-sponsored passage through the Grand Canyon
- John Tillson, Illinois House of Representatives

=== Honorary members ===
- Edward Bates (Honorary), United States Attorney General, U.S. House of Representatives, and Attorney General of Missouri
- William Henry Bissell (Honorary), Governor of Illinois and United States House of Representatives
- William Brown (Honorary), Illinois House of Representatives and Illinois Circuit Courts
- Stephen A. Douglas (Honorary), United States Senator, United States House of Representatives, associate justice of the Supreme Court of Illinois, and Secretary of State of Illinois
- Samuel B. Fairbank (Honorary), evangelist, writer, translator, and amateur naturalist who worked in India with the American Marathi Mission
- John F. Farnsworth (Honorary), United States House of Representatives
- Abraham Lincoln (Honorary), President of the United States
- Owen Lovejoy (Honorary), Congregational minister, abolitionist, and United States House of Representatives
- Jesse O. Norton (Honorary), United States House of Representatives
- Lyman Trumbull (Honorary), United States Senator, United States House of Representatives, Illinois Secretary of State, and justice of the Illinois Supreme Court
- John Wood (Honorary), Governor of Illinois, Lieutenant Governor of Illinois, and Illinois Senate
- Richard Yates (Honorary), Governor of Illinois, United States Senate, United States House of Representatives, and Illinois House of Representatives

== See also ==
- College literary societies
- Beecher Hall
