= Away in a Manger =

Late nineteenth century Christmas carol

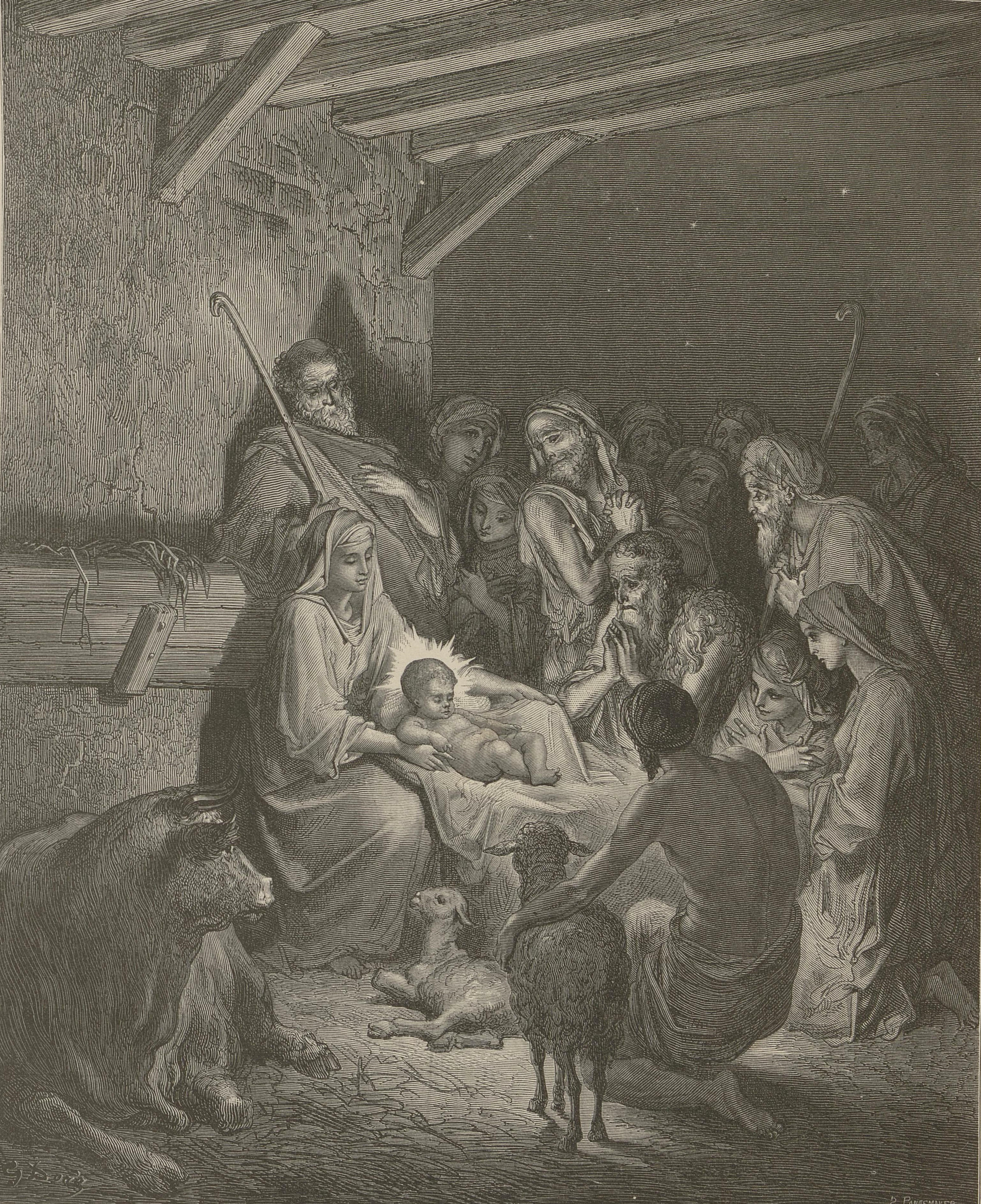
- The Birth of Jesus (1878) by Gustave Doré
- Genre: Christmas carol
- Written: 1882
- Based on: Luke 2:4-7
- Meter: 11.11.11.11
- Melody: "Cradle Song" by William J. Kirkpatrick, "Mueller" by James R. Murray

"Away in a Manger" is a Christmas carol first published in the late nineteenth century and used widely throughout the English-speaking world. In Britain, it is one of the most popular carols; a 1996 Gallup Poll ranked it joint second. Although it was long claimed to be the work of German religious reformer Martin Luther, the carol is now thought to be wholly American in origin. The two most common musical settings are by William J. Kirkpatrick (1895) and James Ramsey Murray (1887).

== Words ==
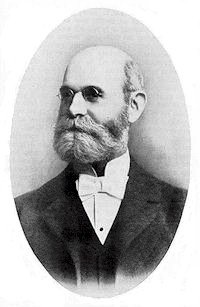
William J. Kirkpatrick

The popularity of the carol has led to many variants in the words, which are discussed in detail below. The following are taken from Kirkpatrick (1895):

Away in a manger, no crib for a bed,
The little Lord Jesus laid down his sweet head.
The stars in the bright sky looked down where he lay,
The little Lord Jesus asleep on the hay.

The cattle are lowing, the baby awakes,
But little Lord Jesus, no crying he makes.
I love thee, Lord Jesus! look down from the sky,
And stay by my cradle till morning is nigh.

Be near me, Lord Jesus; I ask thee to stay
Close by me forever, and love me I pray.
Bless all the dear children in thy tender care,
And take us to heaven to live with thee there.

=== Variants ===
Almost every line in the carol has recorded variants. The most significant include the following:

- Verse 1, line 1: The earliest sources have "no crib for his bed". "No crib for a bed" is found in Murray (1887).
- Verse 1, line 2: The earliest sources have "lay down his sweet head." "Laid" is first found in "Little Children's Book" (1885) – see lie/lay distinction.
- Verse 1, line 2: Some sources, from as early as 1900, have "his wee head" instead of "his sweet head."
- Verse 1, line 3: The earliest sources have "[t]he stars in the sky looked down where he lay", leading to this line having only ten syllables as opposed to the eleven of the other lines of the verse (unless "looked" is pronounced as two syllables, as is done in some musical settings). Herbert (1891) substituted "stars in the heaven", and Gabriel (1892) "stars in the heavens" to regularize the meter. Kirkpatrick (1895) may have been the first to use "stars in the bright sky".
- Verse 1, line 4: The earliest sources have "asleep in the hay." Murray (1887) changes this to "on the hay."
- Verse 2, line 1: The earliest sources have "the poor baby wakes". "The baby awakes" is found in Herbert (1891).
- Verse 2, line 3: Some sources have "look down from on high".
- Verse 2, line 4: This line has a multitude of variants:
  - "And stay by my crib watching my lullaby" (Christian Cynosure, 1882)
  - "And stay by my crib to watch lullaby" (Seamen's Magazine, 1883)
  - "And stay by my cradle to watch lullaby" (Murray, 1887)
  - "And watch by me always, and ever be nigh" (1890)
  - "And stay by my cradle till morning is nigh" (Herbert, 1891)
  - "And watch o'er my bed while in slumber I lie" (1893)
  - "And stay by my side until morning is nigh" (1905)
- Verse 3 is absent from the earliest publications. It first appears in Gabriel's Vineyard Songs (1892).
- Verse 3, line 4: Instead of "take us to heaven", one popular variant found from 1899 has "fit us for heaven".

== History ==
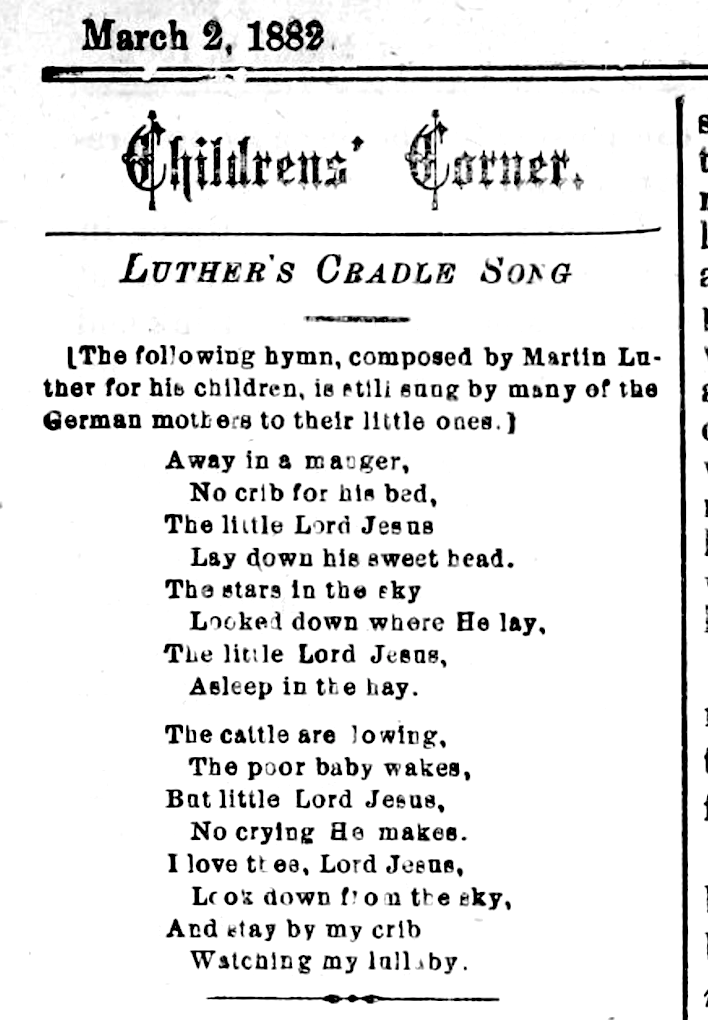
The Christian Cynosure (2 March 1882)

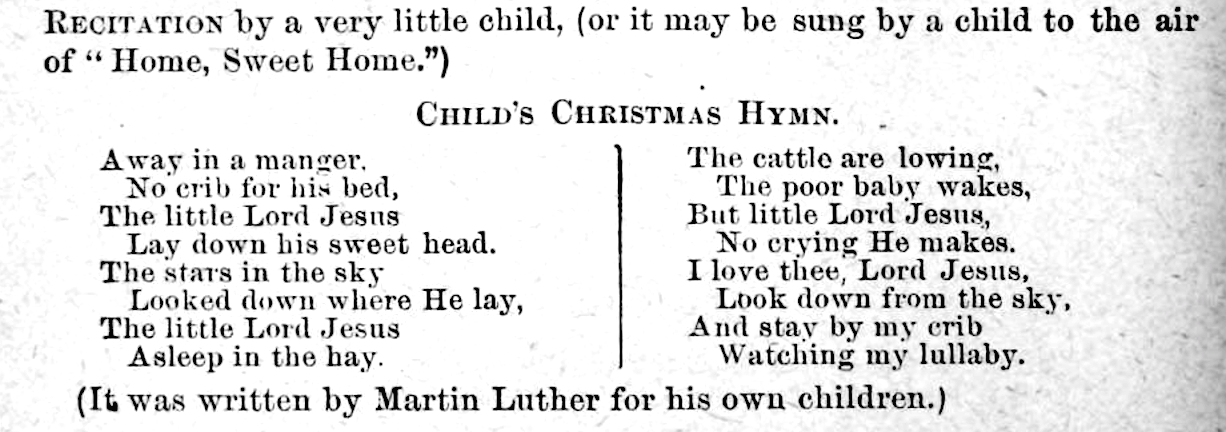
Little Pilgrim Songs (1883)

=== First and second verses ===
The origin of the words is obscure. An early appearance was on 2 March 1882, in the "Childrens' [sic] Corner" section of the anti-Masonic journal The Christian Cynosure. Under the heading "Luther's Cradle Song", an anonymous author contributed the first two verses, writing:

The following hymn, composed by Martin Luther for his children, is still sung by many of the German mothers to their little ones.

A near-identical article appeared in the November 1883 issue of The Sailors' Magazine and Seamen's Friend.

Another early version was published in Little Pilgrim Songs, a book of Christian music for young children, whose preface is dated 10 November 1883. Little Pilgrim Songs includes a similar claim that the song was written "by Martin Luther for his own children".

An article in the May 1884 issue of The Myrtle, a periodical of the Universalist Publishing House in Boston, also included the carol, stating:

Martin Luther, the great German reformer, who was born four hundred years ago the 10th of next November, composed the following hymn for his children; and it is still sung by many German mothers to their little ones.

All four sources include almost-identical text of the first two verses, with no music. Little Pilgrim Songs and The Myrtle both suggest the melody of Home! Sweet Home!

=== Third verse ===
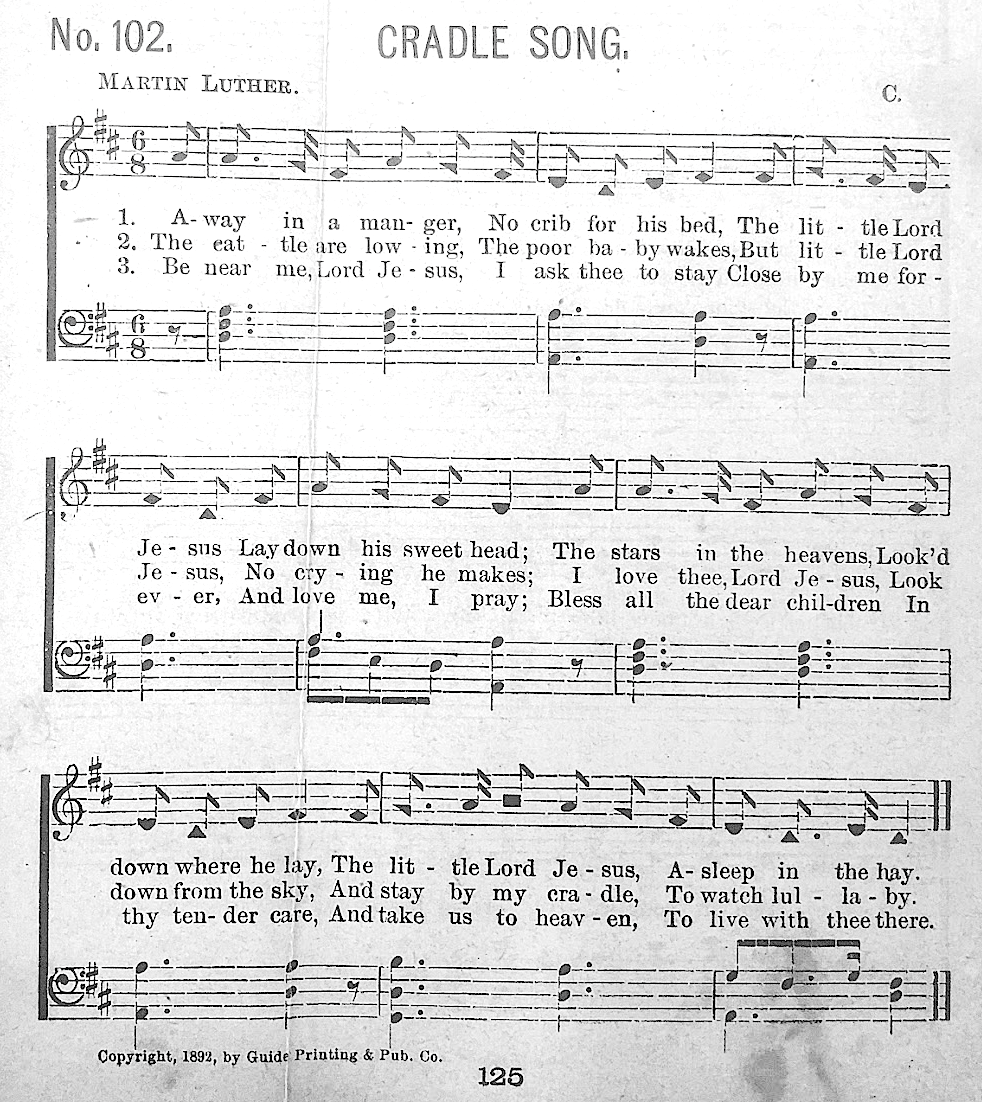
Gabriel's Vineyard Songs (1892), the earliest known publication of the third verse

The third stanza, "Be near me, Lord Jesus", is absent from the known early sources. Its first known appearance was in Gabriel's Vineyard Songs (1892), where it was set to a melody by Charles H. Gabriel (simply marked "C"). Gabriel credited the entire text to Luther and gave it the title "Cradle Song". Decades later, a story was published attributing the third verse to John T. MacFarland:

Bishop William F. Anderson has given the story of the writing of the third stanza: When I was Secretary of the Board of Education, 1904–08, I wanted to use "Away in a manger", which I found with the designation "Martin Luther's Cradle Song", in the Children's Day program one year. It had but two stanzas, 1 and 2. Dr. John T. McFarland, then Secretary of our Board of Sunday Schools, was my near neighbor in his office at 150 Fifth Avenue (New York). I asked him to write a third stanza. He went to his office and within an hour brought me the third stanza beginning, "Be near me, Lord Jesus, I ask Thee to stay." I used it, which was the first time it was ever published. I am pleased to see that it is now being used very widely. The honor of it belongs to that great and good man, Dr. John T. McFarland.

Since this story dates the composition of the stanza to 1904–1908, over a decade after its first known appearance, Hill judges that "the 1892 publication [of Gabriel's Vineyard Songs] renders the Bishop's story suspect, and additional evidence must be found before McFarland can be safely credited with the writing of the third stanza." It has been suggested that Gabriel may have written the third stanza himself and attributed it to Luther.

=== Popularity ===
By Christmas of 1883, "Luther's Cradle Song" was already being performed as a recitation as part of a Sunday School celebration in a church in Nashville. The early popularity of the hymn may also be reflected in a report (published in 1885, but covering the year 1884) from an American mission in Maharashtra, India, stating:

[t]he hymns and cradle songs learned in the school, are often sung at home. One woman said that 'Hush my dear', and 'Mother mine', were heard all day in their alley, and now more lately, Luther's cradle hymn, 'Away in a manger, no cot for his bed', has a place with them and is a favorite.

By 1891, Hill writes, "the carol was sweeping the country [the United States]", with at least four musical settings published that year.

== Spurious attribution to Luther ==
The great majority of early publications ascribe the words to German Protestant reformer Martin Luther. Many go so far as to title the carol "Luther's Cradle Song" or "Luther's Cradle Hymn", to describe the English words as having been translated from Luther, or to speak of its alleged popularity in Germany. The claim of Luther's authorship continued to be made well into the 20th century, but it is now rejected as spurious for the following reasons:

- No text in Luther's known writings corresponds to the carol.
- No German text for the carol has been found from earlier than 1934, more than 50 years after the first English publication. That German text reads awkwardly, and appears to be a result of a translation from the English original.
- The unadorned narrative style of the carol is atypical of Luther, who, Hill states, "could never throw off his role of educator and doctrinarian."
- When some earlier 19th-century sources do mention a carol written by Luther for his son Hans, they are referring to a different text: "Vom Himmel hoch, da komm ich her".

Richard Hill, in a comprehensive study of the carol written in 1945, suggested that "Away in a Manger" might have originated in "a little play for children to act or a story about Luther celebrating Christmas with his children", likely connected with the 400th anniversary of the reformer's birth in 1883.

== Music ==
=== "Mueller" ===
The most popular musical setting in the United States is commonly known as "Mueller". The melody was first published, under the title "Luther's Cradle Hymn", by James R. Murray in his collection Dainty Songs for Little Lads and Lasses (1887).

Murray included a claim that the hymn was "[c]omposed by Martin Luther for his children". Hill writes:

Wherever he got the ideas expressed in the heading, Mr. Murray made one serious tactical mistake in saying that Luther "composed" the hymn, and then placing only his own initials where the composer's name is normally given. As a consequence, his fellow compilers of song books apparently supposed that all he had done was to arrange the accompaniment.

As a result of this "tactical mistake", Murray's melody appeared, without credit, in several subsequent publications. By 1914, the melody was attributed to "Carl Mueller", and this attribution was repeated several times in other publications. The identity of "Carl Mueller" is unknown, but the tune is widely known as "Mueller" as a result.

=== "Cradle Song" ===
The standard melody in Britain, Ireland and Canada is "Cradle Song". The tune, written by the Irish-American composer William J. Kirkpatrick, was first published as part of the collection Around the World with Christmas (1895), a "Christmas Exercise" for schools featuring material representing various countries: "Away in a Manger" was included, under the title "Luther's Cradle Hymn", as a representative of "The German Fatherland".

Kirkpatrick's melody was later published in numerous hymnbooks, and was the setting that, in Hill's words, "first carried the words beyond the confines of the United States", being included in collections such as Carey Bonner's Sunday School Hymnary (1905). It remains the most popular musical setting of "Away in a Manger" outside the United States.

=== Other musical settings ===
In his article "Not So Far Away in a Manger; Forty-One Settings of an American Carol", published in the Music Library Association Notes (second series) III, no. 1, for December 1945, Richard Hill treated 41 of the nearly 200 different musical settings of this text.

The first music mentioned in connection with "Away in a Manger" was a pre-existing composition: Home! Sweet Home! (also known as "There's No Place Like Home"). This was suggested as a musical setting in Little Pilgrim Songs (1883) and The Myrtle (1884), and continued to be mentioned as an appropriate melody for decades to come. A musical arrangement was published in the early 1920s.

The first known musical setting specifically published with the words appeared in an Evangelical Lutheran Sunday school collection, Little Children's Book for Schools and Families (1885; preface dated Christmas 1884), where it simply bore the title "Away in a Manger". It was set to a tune called "St. Kilda", credited to J.E. Clark. The tune, according to Hill, "gives every appearance of being a standard melody used elsewhere for other hymns", but Hill adds that "no information on J. E. Clark or any other printing of his tune, previous or later, has been located." This publication is also notable for refraining from attributing the carol to Luther.

The melody by John Bunyan Herbert (first published in 1891), is identified by Hill as among the most popular. Like Murray's, Herbert's setting was often republished without credit to the original composer, with the melody sometimes even being misattributed to Luther himself.

Charles H. Gabriel, already mentioned as being the first to publish the third verse in 1892, is also notable for having published more different musical arrangements of the hymn than any other known composer. His 1896 setting, reprinted in many different collections, is based on his 1892 melody but adds a chorus at the end of each verse, with the word "asleep" sung antiphonally.

Another popular arrangement, found at least as early as 1897, sets the words to Jonathan E. Spilman's 1838 melody "Flow Gently, Sweet Afton". Hill, writing in 1941, found Spilman's musical setting to be the second-most published, after Murray's.

An arrangement dating from 1911 sets the words to an "old Normandy Carol". This melody was subsequently published in Carols for Choirs, arranged by Reginald Jacques.

An arrangement by Christopher Erskine combines the two most popular tunes for the hymn, from Kirkpatrick and Murray. Erskine's arrangement was first performed in 1996 at the annual pair of joint Carol Services in Manuka, Canberra, sung by the choirs of St Paul's Church (Anglican) and St Christopher's Cathedral (Roman Catholic). In this version, the Kirkpatrick setting is sung by one choir, and the Murray setting by the other choir, alternating through the first two verses. Both settings are sung together for the third verse.

Musical settings of "Away In A Manger"
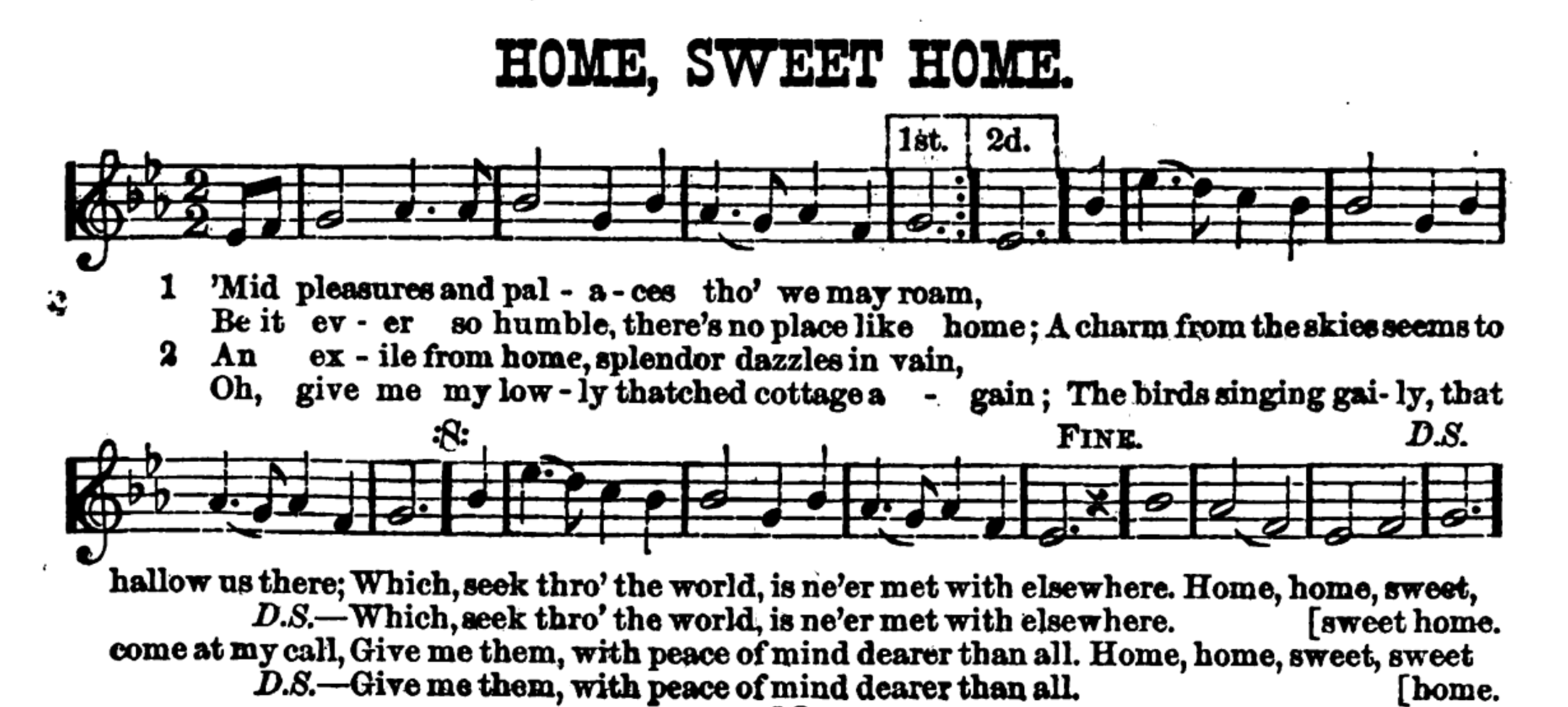
An 1880 publication of "Home, Sweet Home", the earliest known musical setting of the carol.

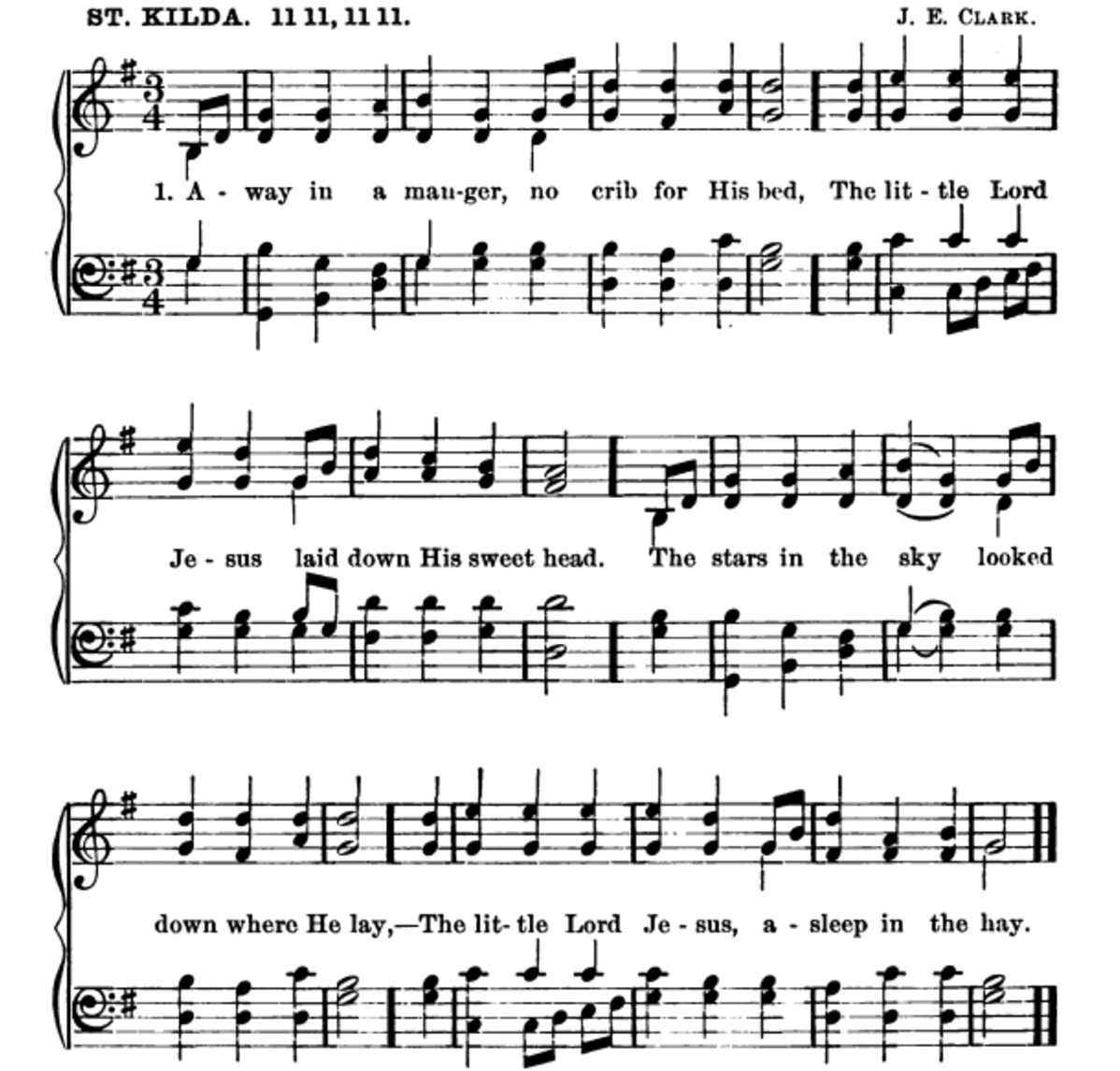
First known musical setting to be published with the carol, from "Little children's book" (1885).

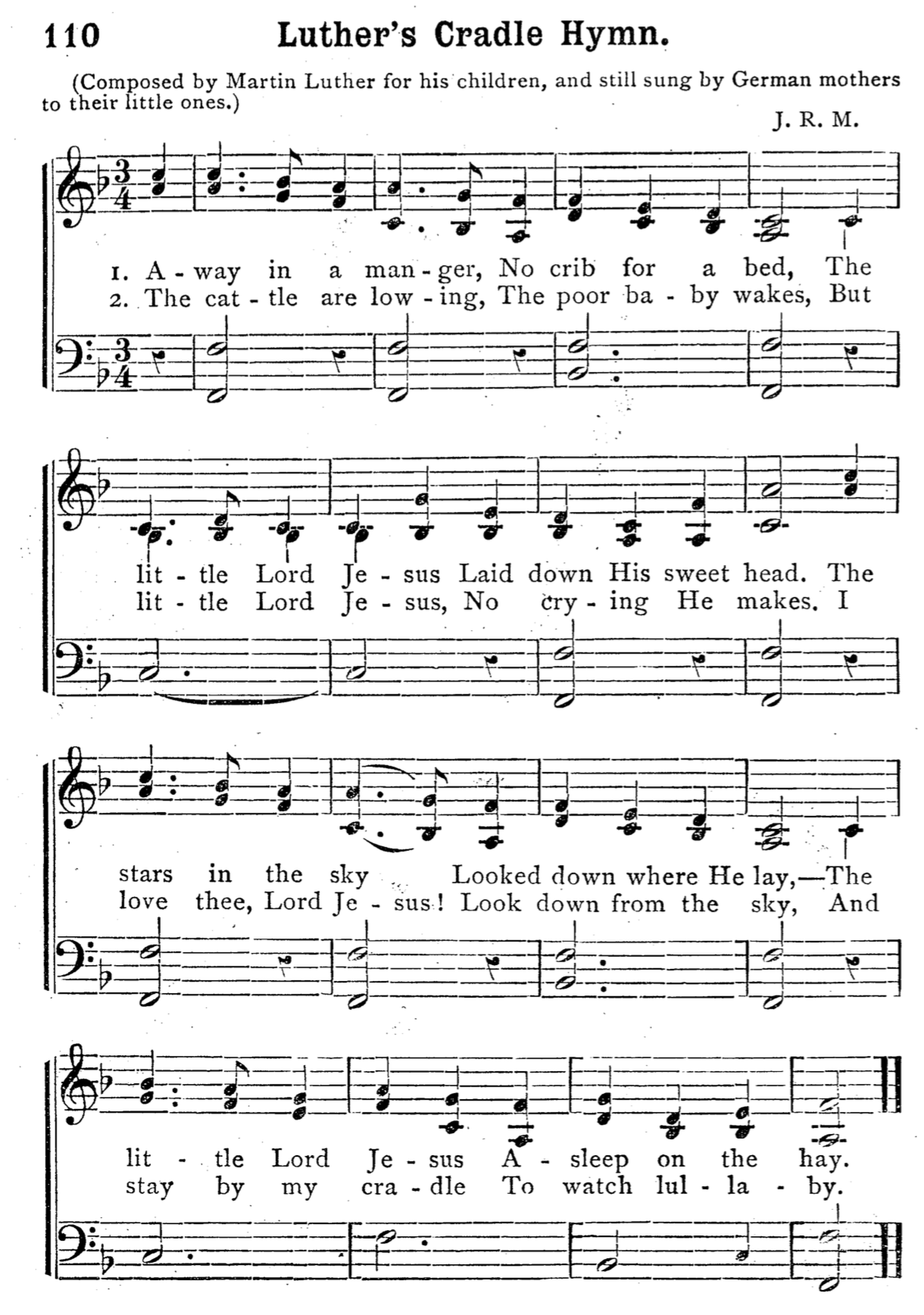
"Mueller" by James R. Murray, as originally published in 1887.

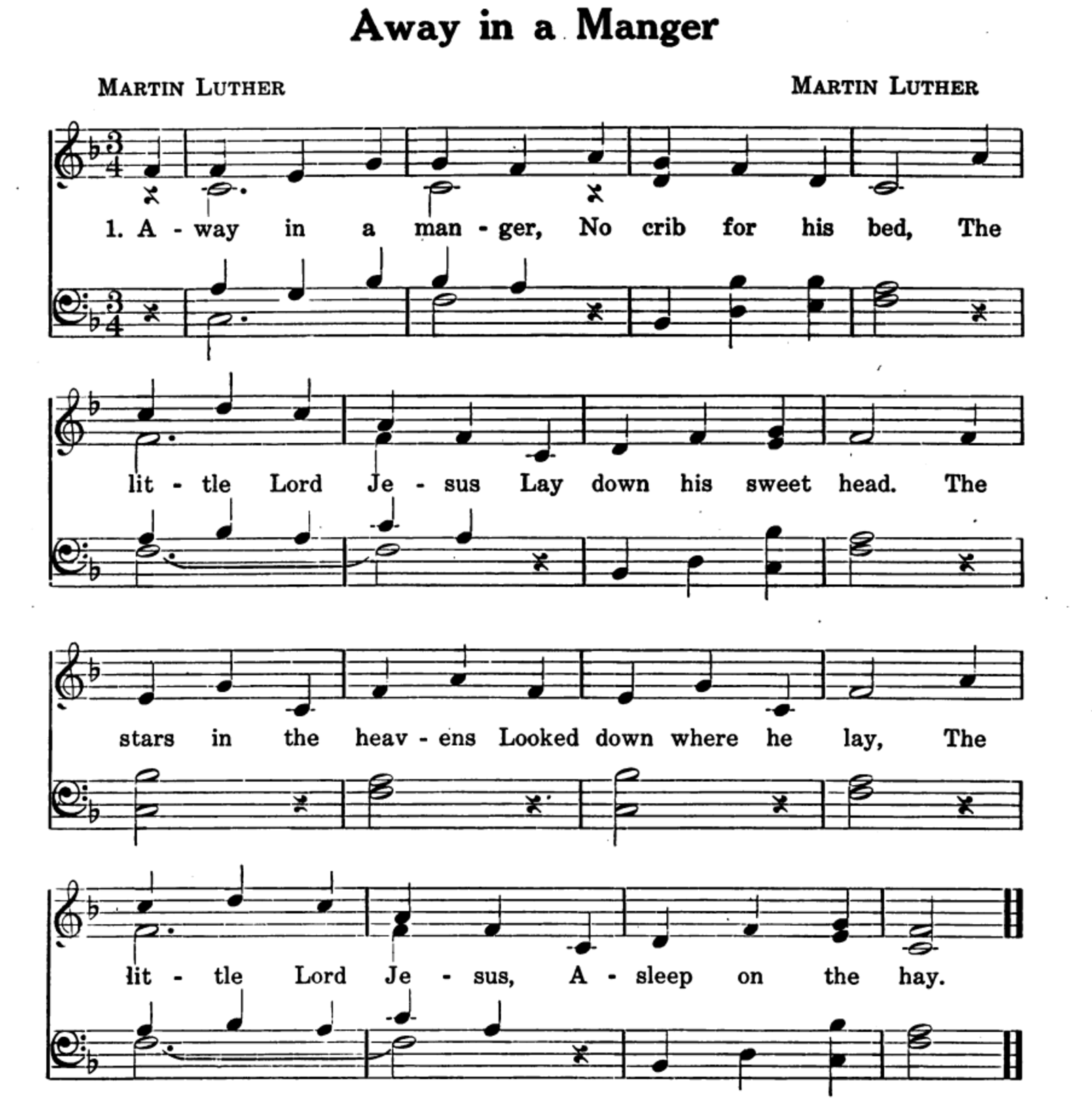
J. B. Herbert's setting (1891), misattributed to Luther in this 1921 collection.

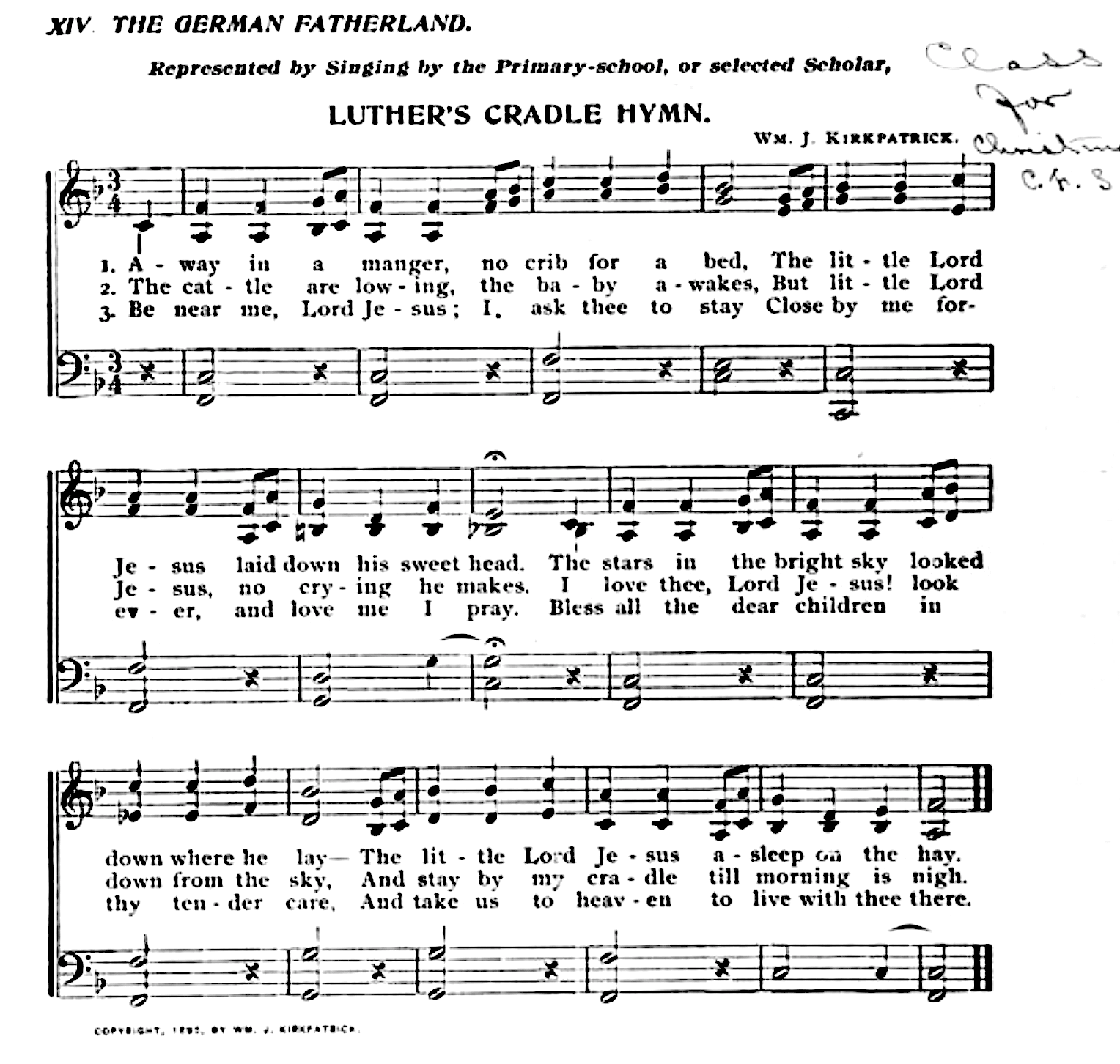
"Cradle Song" by William J. Kirkpatrick, as originally published in 1895.

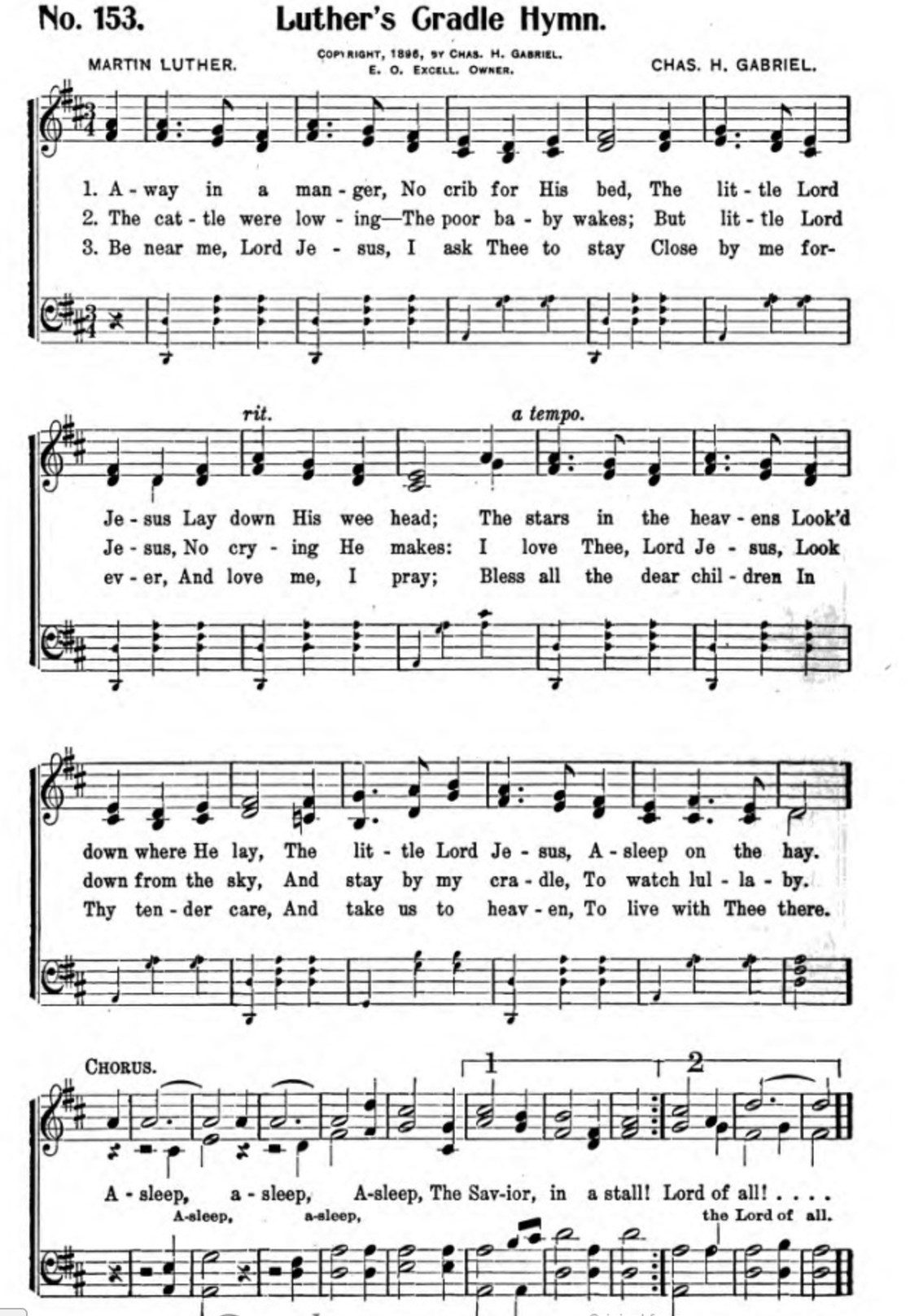
Charles H. Gabriel's 1896 setting, featuring a chorus at the end of each verse.

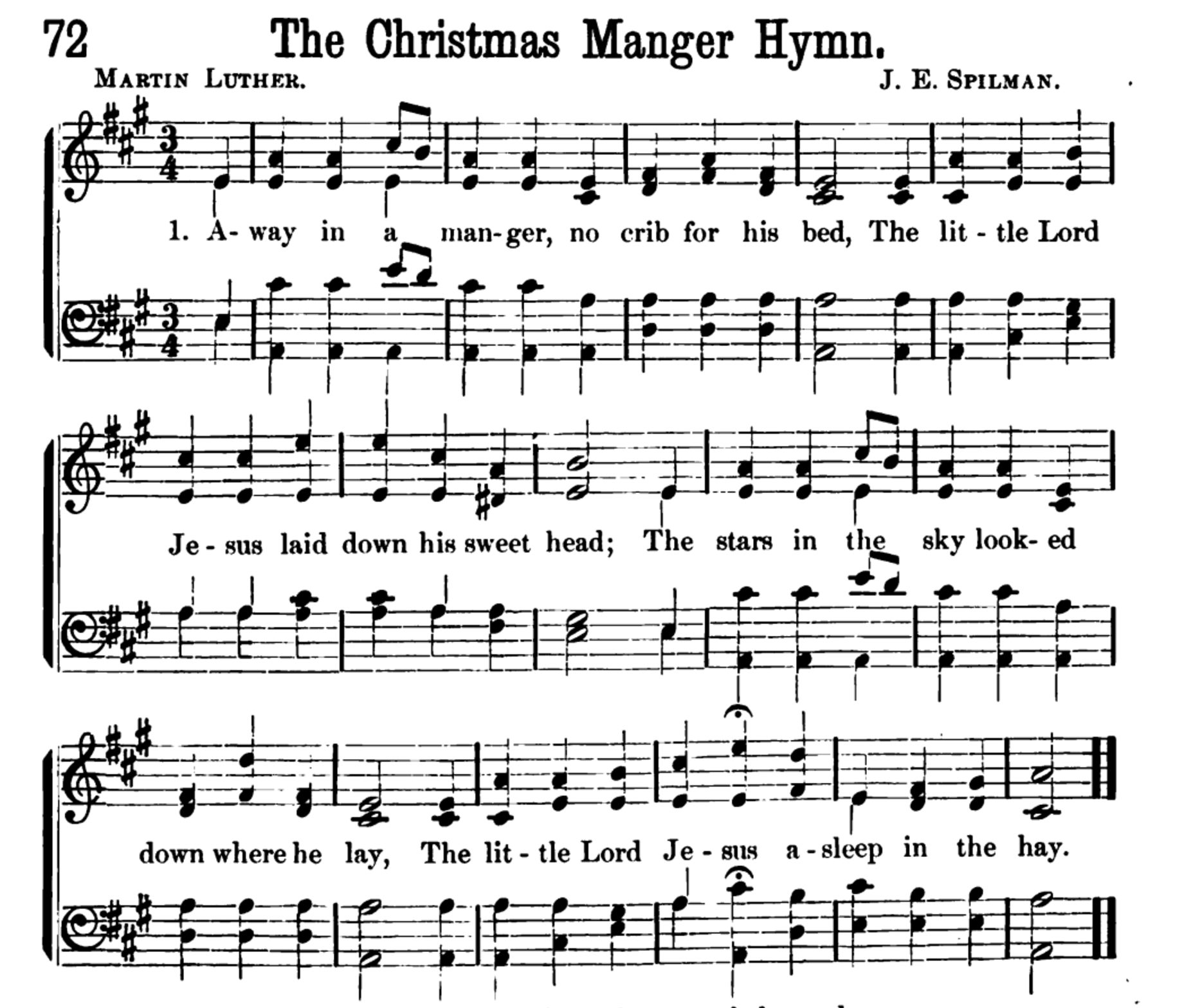
Set to the melody "Flow gently, Sweet Afton" by Spilman (from an 1898 collection).

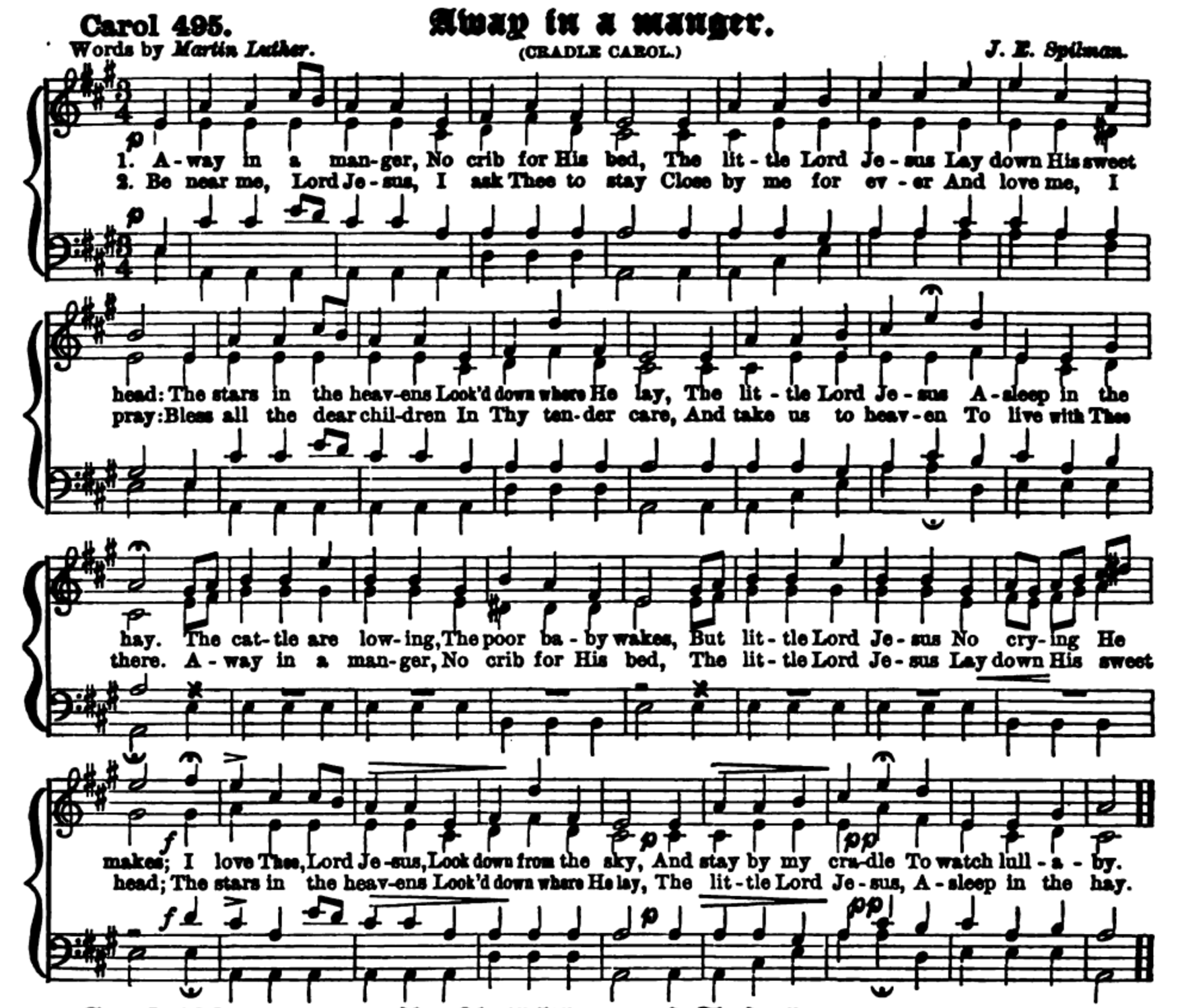
A more expansive arrangement of Spilman's melody (1916).

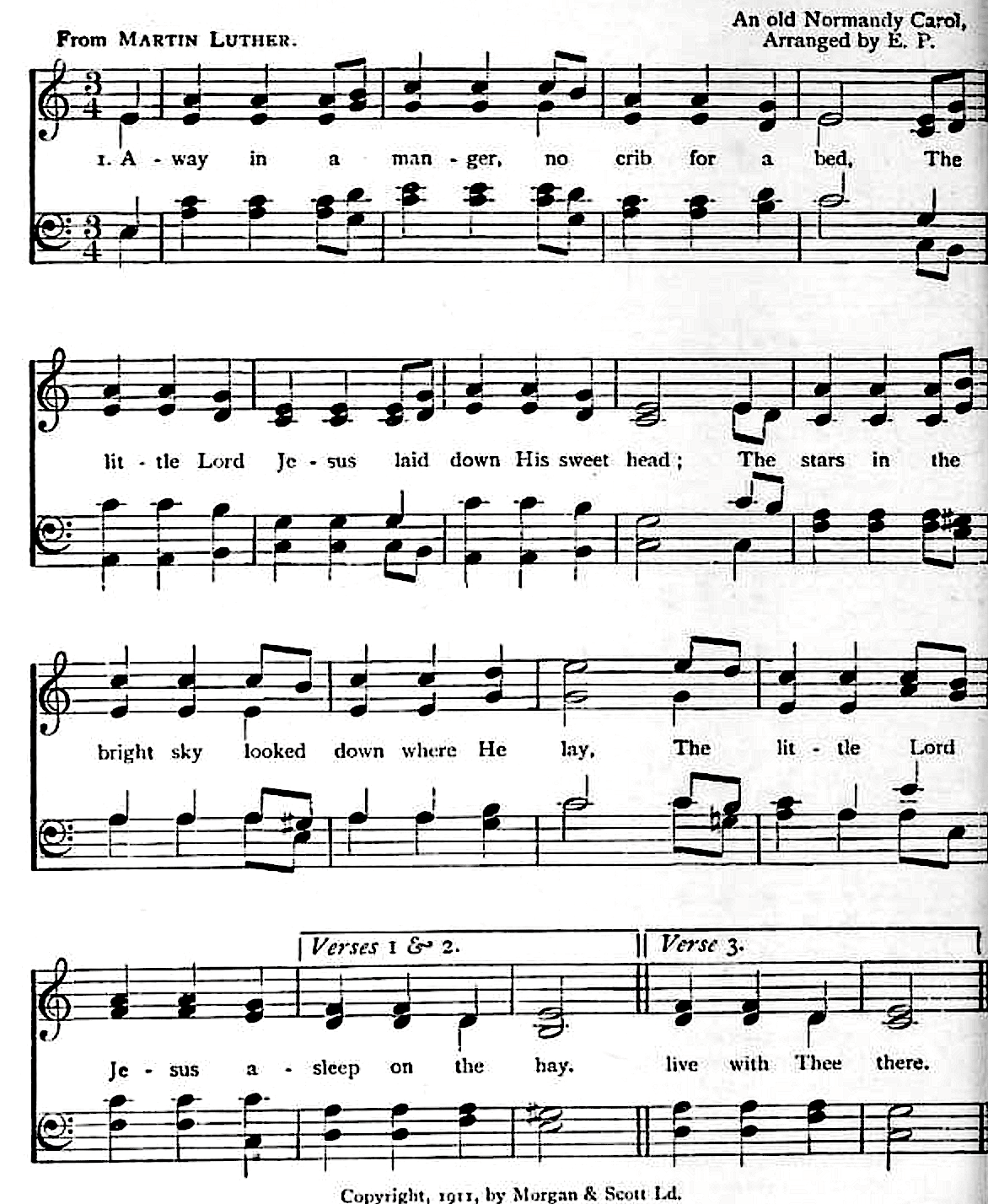
Set to an "Old Normandy carol" (1911).

== See also ==
- List of Christmas carols
- Nativity scene
