= Illinois College =

Private college in Jacksonville, Illinois, US

- Type: Private liberal arts college
- Established: 1829; 197 years ago
- Religious affiliation: United Church of Christ and Presbyterian Church (USA)
- Academic affiliations: APCU; NAICU
- Endowment: $133 million (2025)
- President: Barbara A. Farley
- Students: 942 (Fall 2024)
- Location: Jacksonville, Illinois, U.S. 39°43′49″N 90°14′48″W
- Campus: 80 acres (32 ha)
- Colors: Blue and white
- Nicknames: Blueboys and Lady Blues
- Sporting affiliations: NCAA Division III — Midwest Conference
- Mascot: Blueboy
- Website: ic.edu
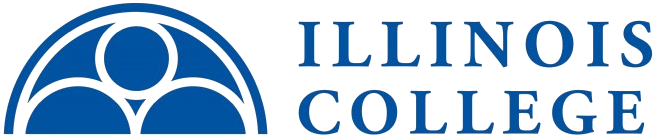

Illinois College is a private liberal arts college in Jacksonville, Illinois. It is affiliated with the United Church of Christ and the Presbyterian Church (USA). It was the second college founded in Illinois but the first to grant a degree (in 1835). It was founded in 1829 by the Yale Band, students from Yale College who traveled westward to found new colleges. It briefly served as the state's first medical school, from 1843 to 1848.

== History ==
John M. Ellis, a Presbyterian missionary in the East, saw the need for a “seminary of learning” in the new state of Illinois. His plans drew the attention of Congregational students at Yale College, and seven of them, in one of the famous “Yale Bands,” came westward to help found the college.

The first president of Illinois College was Edward Beecher who left his position at the Park Street Church in Boston and firmly imbued the new college with New England traditions and academic foundations. His sister, Harriet Beecher Stowe, was later the author of the influential anti-slavery novel Uncle Tom’s Cabin and a visitor to the campus. His brother, Henry Ward Beecher, preached and lectured at the college as well. Beecher Hall, named in honor of president Beecher, was the first building constructed on the Illinois College campus, and remains the oldest college building in the state of Illinois.

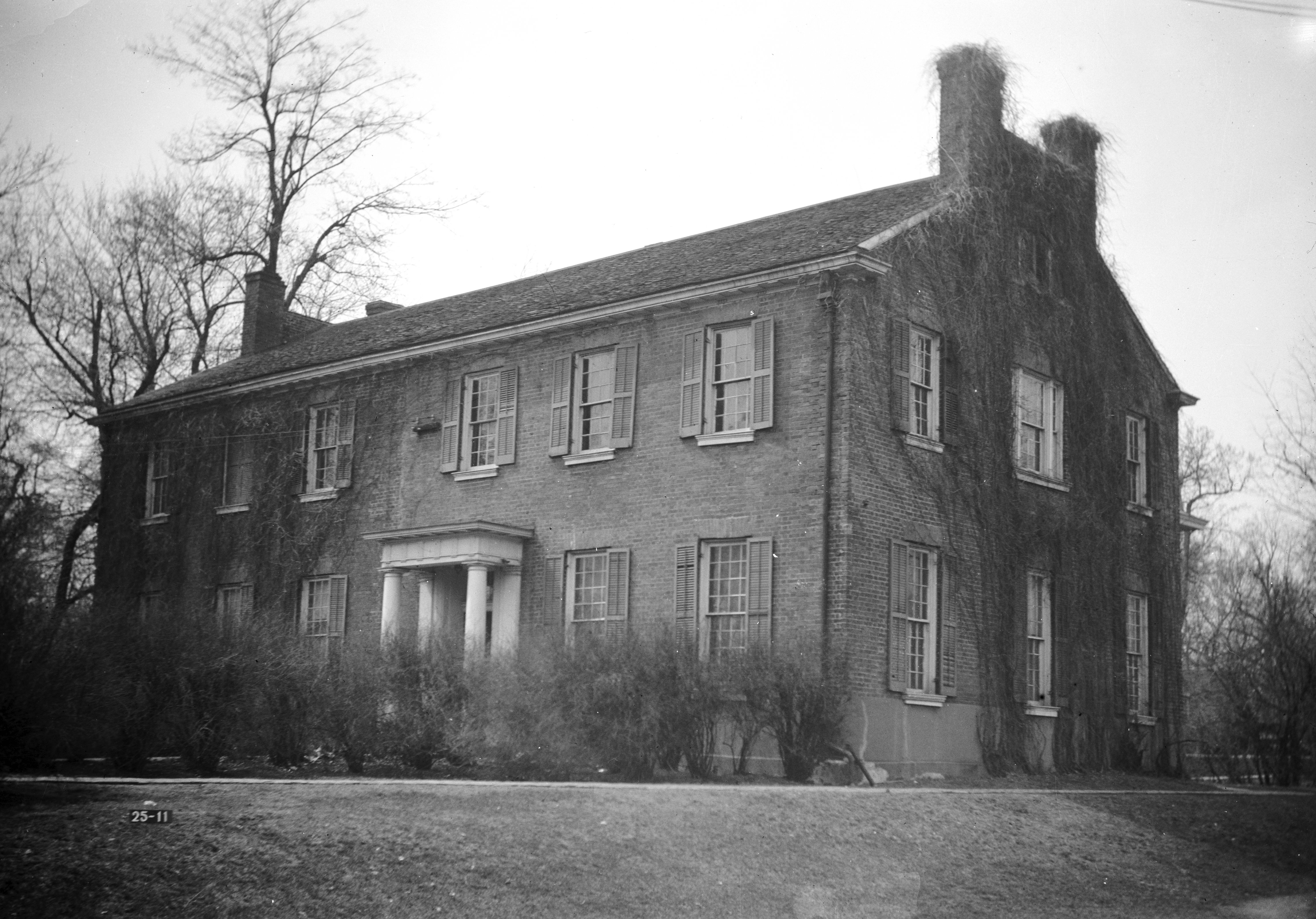
Beecher Hall in 1934

The first two college graduates in the state of Illinois, Richard Yates and Jonathan E. Spilman, received their degrees from Illinois College in 1835. Yates became the Civil War governor of Illinois and later a U.S. senator. A program at Illinois College for first generation college students was named The Yates Fellowship Program in his honor. Jonathan Edwards Spilman composed the familiar music to Robert Burns’ poem “Flow Gently, Sweet Afton.”

William Jennings Bryan, a member of the class of 1881, is one of the most prominent alumni of Illinois College. He was a United States Congressman from Nebraska, the US Secretary of State, and the Democratic Party's presidential nominee in 1896, 1900, and 1908.

Many Illinois College graduates have gone on to have influential careers in public service. Two graduates became U.S. senators, 20 became congressmen, six were state governors and two currently serve as federal judges.

Among the visitors and lecturers on campus during the early years were Ralph Waldo Emerson, Amos Bronson Alcott, Mark Twain, Horace Greeley, Oscar Wilde and Wendell Phillips. Many speakers, including Abraham Lincoln, were sponsored by the college’s literary societies which still exist today.

Illinois College was a center of the abolitionist movement due to its Northern location near the Mississippi River and outspoken campus leaders such as President Edward Beecher and Professor Jonathan Baldwin Turner. In the mid-1800s, a group of students at the college were indicted by a grand jury for harboring runaway slaves. Two campus buildings also have ties to the abolitionist movement; Beecher Hall is believed to have been part of the Underground Railroad, and a campus house, the Gillett House, has attained the prestigious National Park Service certification as a “National Underground Railroad Network to Freedom” site.

The college became co-educational in 1903 by incorporating the Jacksonville Female Academy (founded 1830), and in 1906 IC awarded degrees to its first four female graduates. Illinois Conservatory of Music (founded 1871) was also absorbed in 1903. In 1932 Phi Beta Kappa society established a chapter at Illinois College, and it remains one of only 11 chapters in the state.

== Academics ==
Illinois College is a liberal arts college with an enrollment of 1,029 (2022) students. Over 80 different programs and majors are offered at the college, including Combined Degree Programs in Biology with Medical Technology, Biology with Occupational Therapy, Nursing (Leading to Master’s), and Physics with Engineering. The most popular programs among students tend to be education, science, or business related.

The student to faculty ratio is often around 13:1, with a current average class size of 16 (2013) students.

Illinois College has been accredited by the Higher Learning Commission or its predecessor since 1913. The college's Epsilon chapter of the Phi Beta Kappa national honor society is one of only eleven in the state; it was established in 1932.

All degrees awarded by Illinois College are undergraduate bachelor's degrees with the exception of a newer Master of Arts in education. The M.A.Ed. is a 32-credit hour on-campus degree program which was designed to specifically accommodate the professional development needs of in-service teachers.

It established a nursing program after the closure of MacMurray College, which had a nursing program.

=== Starhill Forest Arboretum ===
Starhill Forest Arboretum is located 45 miles northeast of the Illinois College campus in the town of Petersburg. In 2008, Illinois College officially entered into a partnership with the arboretum. Since the partnership, Starhill has been a location for Illinois College students to visit, study, and participate in internships.

=== Congressional museum and archives ===
The Whipple Hall on the college campus houses the Paul Findley Congressional Office Museum, dedicated to former congressman and alumnus, Paul Findley. Findley graduated from Illinois College in 1943 and served as a member of the House of Representatives from 1961 to 1983. It contains artifacts related to Findley's political career, his interest in Abraham Lincoln, and his involvement in human rights and Middle East issues. Items currently on display include Lincoln's 1837 law office sofa, Findley's congressional desk, WWI and campaign memorabilia, and gifts from seven U.S. presidents and international leaders. The museum is open to tours and visits by appointment. It was renovated in 2007 thanks to a donation by Mohammed Al Habtoor.

=== Intercultural exchange program ===
The college participates in an Intercultural Exchange program with Ritsumeikan University in Kyoto, Japan. Each spring 25 Japanese students come to Illinois College to live and study for four weeks. During this time, students live with families in the Jacksonville community for part of the time and with current IC students on campus in residence halls for the remainder of their stay.

=== Clinton Global Initiative University Network ===
Illinois College joined the Clinton Global Initiative University Network in 2014. The network was launched in 2007 by President Bill Clinton and is closely modeled after the Clinton Global Initiative. The network helps support the work of leaders on college campuses around the world. As a member of the network, Illinois College pledges a minimum of $10,000 in funding to students of the campus who become Clinton Global Initiative University student commitment-makers. As of 2015, Illinois College is one of only 70 schools to be a member of the CGI University Network.

== Campus ==
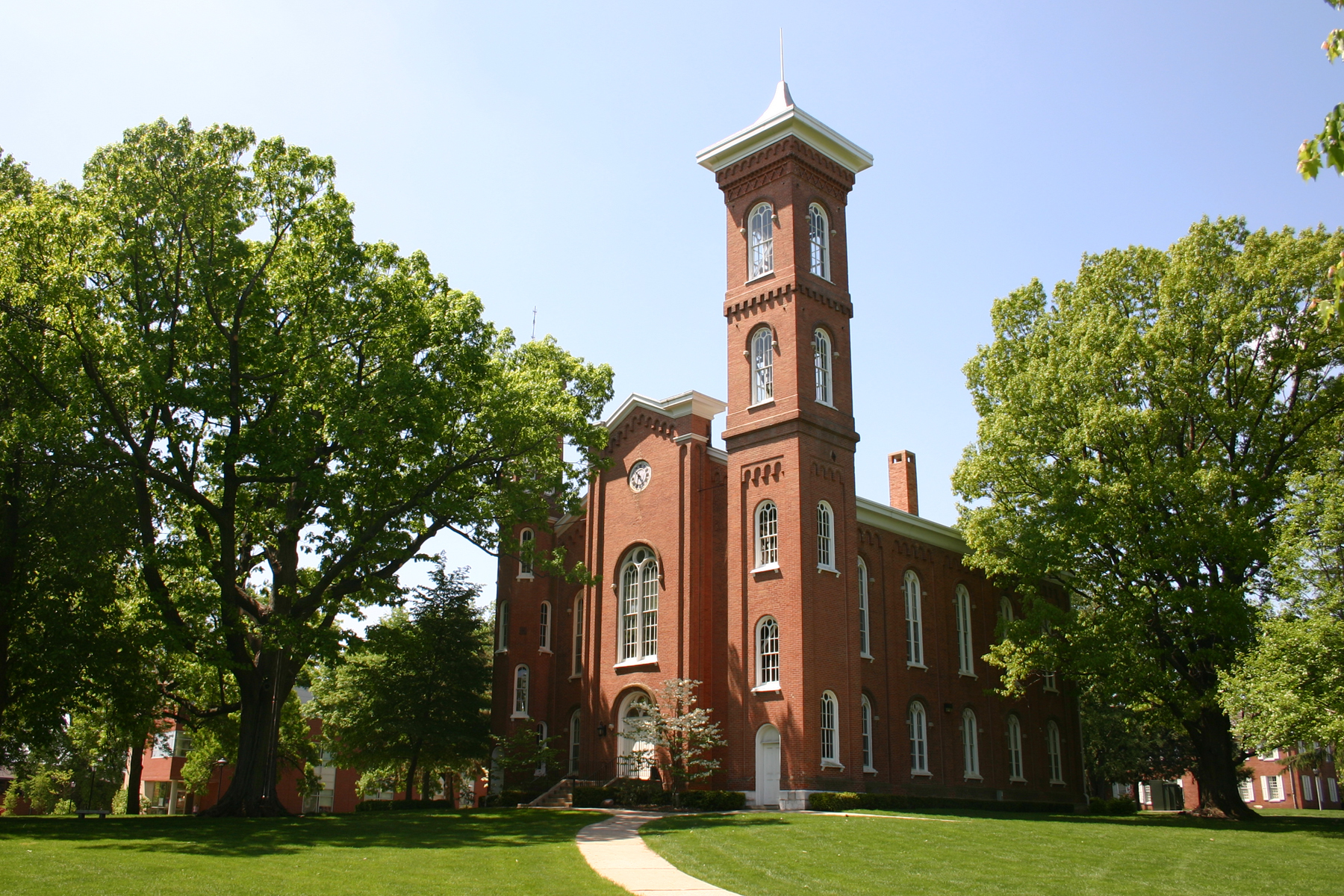
Sturtevant Hall photographed from the upper quad.

The Illinois College campus consists of 80 acres of land located centrally within the town of Jacksonville. The land the campus occupies is higher in elevation than many of the other areas in Jacksonville, and IC is therefore sometimes referred to as “On the Hilltop”, or “The Hilltop”.

The primary section of campus is divided into two areas commonly called the upper and lower quads. The upper quad is on the northern part of the campus, and is higher in elevation than the lower quad which is located on the southern part of the campus.

The upper quad is the location of many of the academic buildings. This includes the notable Sturtevant Hall which is often featured in pictures because of its unique towers and windows which are currently found in the college logo. Other buildings on the Upper Quad include Crampton Residence Hall, which was once the oldest continuously used dormitory in the state. It was closed as a residence hall in May 2006, and re-opened in August 2011 after renovations had been made. Whipple Hall, which was once a preparatory school, underwent renovations, and is now the home to the Al Habtoor Leadership Center, Congressman Paul Findley's Congressional Office, and the Communication and Rhetorical Studies department. William Jennings Bryan carved his initials into a Whipple Hall banister while he was a student, and the initials can still be found on the building along with a commemorative plaque. Tanner Hall, built for the college's centennial, once housed the library. It now houses administrative offices including the Academic Dean’s Office, the Business Office, the Office of Business Affairs, and the Enrollment Offices. Beecher Hall, the first college building erected in Illinois, is named after the college's first president, Edward Beecher, sibling to Henry Ward Beecher and Harriet Beecher Stowe. The first floor of Beecher Hall is the home of Phi Alpha Literary Society. The second floor is the home to Sigma Pi Literary Society. It was named to the National Register of Historic Places.

The lower quad is the newer section of campus where many of the residence halls are located along with the Caine Student Center. Just south of the lower quad is the Bruner Fitness Center as well as the athletic fields for football, soccer, baseball, softball, and tennis.

The upper and lower quads are separated by the Steuer Walkway. Originally, a section of Mound Avenue ran through the campus and provided the separation between the upper and lower quads. Eventually, the section of Mound Avenue running through campus was closed off and the Steuer Walkway was constructed to unify the campus and eliminate traffic concerns for students walking between the quads.

=== Residential life ===
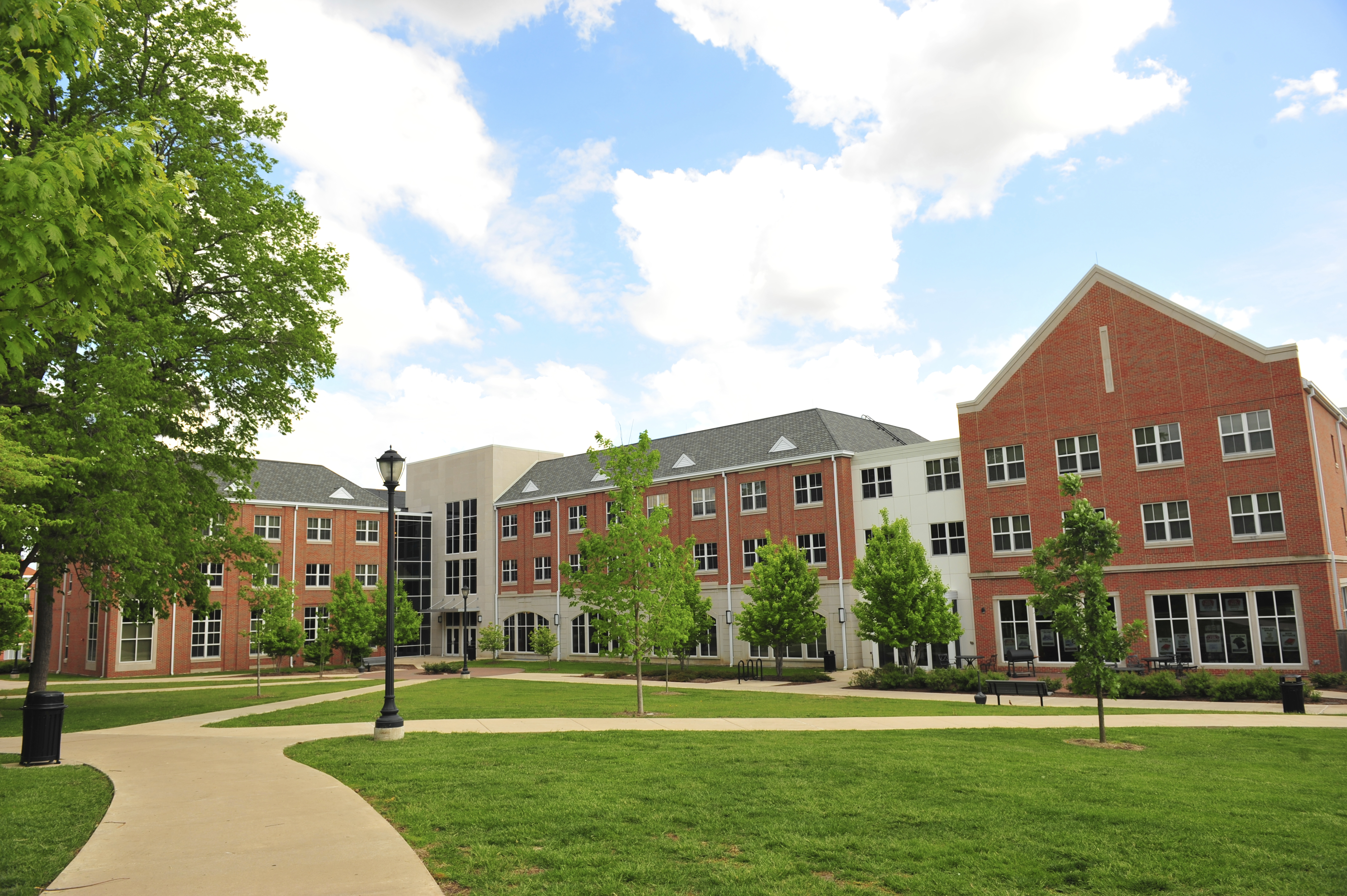
Lincoln Hall dormitory photographed from the lower quad.

Eight residential halls are located on the Illinois College campus: Ellis Hall, Pixley Hall, Gardner Hall, Lincoln Hall, Turner Hall, Mundinger Hall, Crampton Hall, and Greene Hall. In addition to the residence halls, Illinois College owns and maintains an apartment building close to campus which serves as housing for upperclassmen.

=== Activities ===
There are over 80 different clubs and organizations established at Illinois College. Of those, there are three main organizations which help provide campus wide programming and governing:

Student Activities Board (SAB): Consists of six student-run committees dedicated to providing programming to the Illinois College community. SAB sponsored events include comedians, bands, community service projects, trips, lectures, dances, and more.

Homecoming Committee: Homecoming has been a long-standing tradition at Illinois College. Each year, the Homecoming Committee helps plan the pep rally, Powder Puff Football games, parade, formal dance, and an event called Follies which features the talents of students. Class games are often held during Homecoming Week as well.

Student Senate: Student Senate is the student governing body at Illinois College. The organization’s goal is to act as a representative for the student body and promote the best interests of the students.

=== Greek organizations ===
Illinois College is home to a number of Greek organizations. Along with the many academically affiliated Greek organizations, Illinois College also houses a number of national recognized Greek organizations such as Alpha Phi Omega; the co-ed service fraternity that is the largest collegiate fraternity in the United States.

Illinois College is one of the few campuses in the United States that still supports literary societies. These are Greek organizations whose purposes vary from society to society. Activities include but are not limited to: Literary Productions, intramural sports teams, service events, and social gatherings.

There are four men’s literary societies at Illinois College. They are: Sigma Pi, Phi Alpha, Gamma Nu, and Pi Pi Rho. Phi Alpha and Sigma Pi are both located in Beecher Hall (Phi Alpha on the first level and Sigma Pi on the second). Gamma Nu is located in lower Baxter Hall and Pi Pi Rho is currently in a temporary house.

There are three women's societies at Illinois College. They are: Gamma Delta, Sigma Phi Epsilon, and Chi Beta. All three female societies are housed in the historic Smith House.

Society pledging was suspended during 2012 after three "serious incidents” including what college officials described as "dangerous practices". One society pledge was sent to a hospital after receiving life-threatening injuries.

== Abraham Lincoln connection ==
The Illinois College campus and alumni shared many connections with Abraham Lincoln during his life. While Lincoln never received a formal college education, it is documented that he was tutored by William and Lynn Greene who were brothers and students at Illinois College. The brothers would share with Lincoln, through books and notes, what they had learned from Illinois College professor Jonathan Baldwin Turner. Lincoln later practiced law in Springfield, Illinois where he was the partner and mentor of Illinois College alumnus William Herndon. The law office they shared together can still be seen in the Central Springfield Historic District of the city. In 2009, a statue of Abraham Lincoln was dedicated on the Illinois College campus, and he was posthumously awarded a Bachelor of Arts degree from the school.

== Athletics ==
Illinois athletics logo

Illinois College's men's athletic teams are known as the Blueboys which is a reference to the uniforms worn by Union soldiers during the American Civil War. The women's athletic teams are known as the Lady Blues. They have been members of the Midwest Conference since 1982. They were members of the College Conference of Illinois and Wisconsin from 1946 to 1953. Illinois College was a member of the Illinois Intercollegiate Athletic Conference from 1910 to 1937.

Twenty varsity sports are offered for men and women. Soccer, basketball, volleyball, baseball, Softball, indoor Track and Field, Outdoor Track and Field, Cross Country. Swimming, Tennis, Football, and golf. In addition to the varsity teams, there are two non-competitive spirit squads.

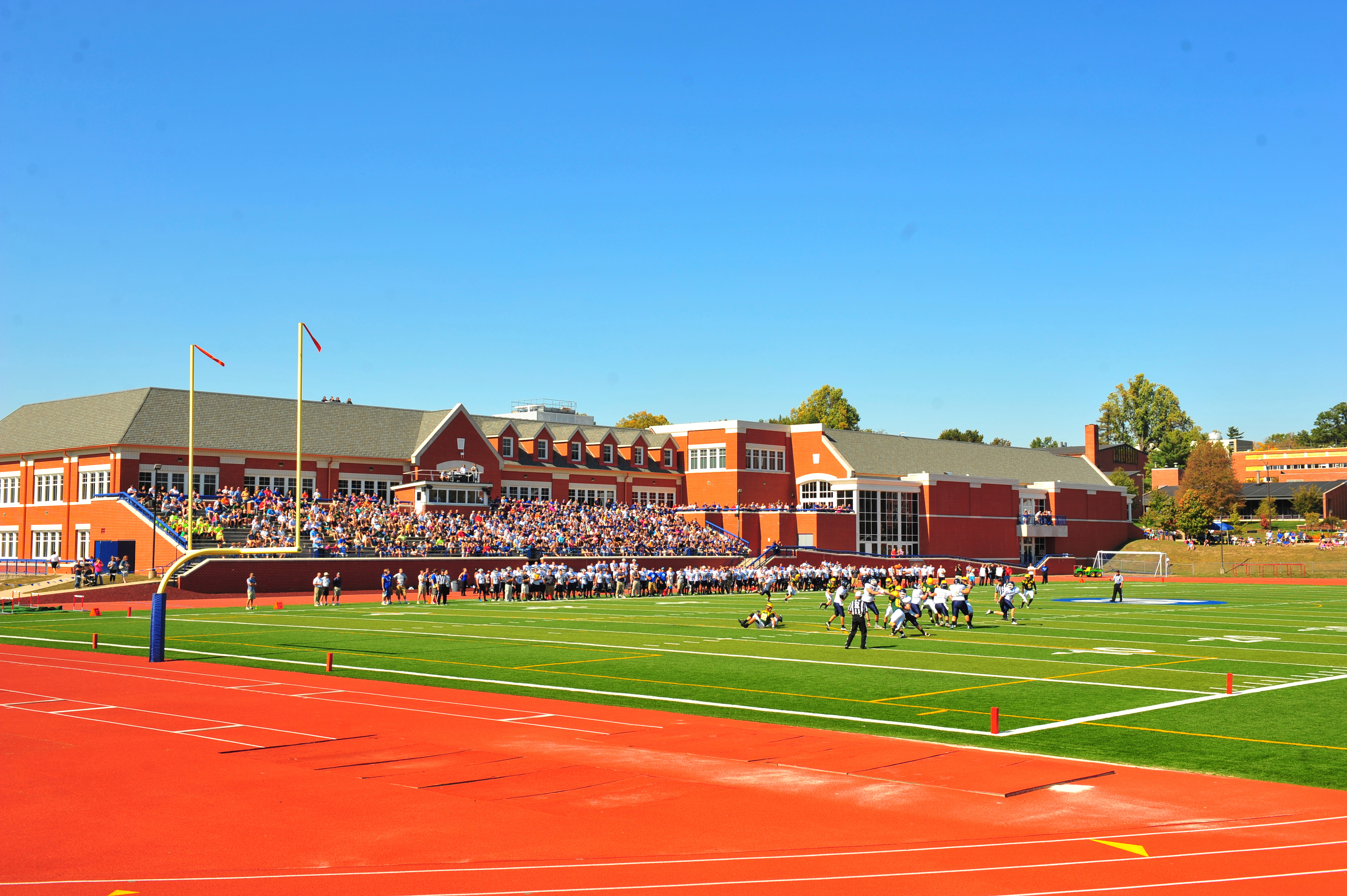
The Bruner Fitness Center during a home football game

Illinois College student Missy Norville won nine NCAA Division III National Champion titles for indoor/outdoor Track and Field while at the school.

In 2010, student Dillon Binkley became the High Jump National Champion for NCAA Division III Indoor Track and Field. Before Binkley, Illinois College student J.R. Dugan also became the NCAA Division III Outdoor Track and Field National High Jump Champion in 1989.

From 2003 to 2008, the Illinois College women's golf team won six consecutive Midwest Conference Championship titles.

=== Bruner Fitness and Recreation Center ===
The Bruner Fitness Center was constructed in 2003 and is the primary location for athletic events at Illinois College. The building also houses the college swimming center and the Sherman Gymnasium which has seating for 1,600 spectators. The fieldhouse section of the building includes a 200-meter indoor track and four multipurpose courts for basketball, volleyball, and tennis. The exterior of Bruner provides the foundation for England Stadium which holds 3,000 spectators.

== Notable alumni ==
- Greg Baise, former head of the Illinois Manufacturers' Association and Director of the Illinois Department of Transportation
- Florence Eugene Baldwin, former member of the Minnesota State Senate
- Charles W. Bryan, 20th and 23rd governor of Nebraska
- William Jennings Bryan, famous orator, three-time Democratic Party candidate for president, United States Secretary of State from 1913 to 1915.
- Cheri Bustos (b. 1961), U.S. congresswoman from Illinois
- John Davis, U.S. Representative from Kansas
- Henry Smith Van Eaton, former US Representative from the state of Mississippi
- Nancy Farmer, former Missouri State Treasurer
- Paul Findley, Illinois politician, former US House member
- M.F.K. Fisher, author, food writer, and translator, attended Illinois College for one semester
- William Herndon, law partner and biographer of Abraham Lincoln
- Fred Hoskins, first co-president of United Church of Christ
- William Jayne, first Governor of Dakota Territory
- Edward E. Johnston, High Commissioner of the Trust Territory of the Pacific Islands
- W. Michie Klusmeyer, Episcopal Bishop of West Virginia from 2001 to 2022
- Everett Dean Martin, Writer, lecturer, social psychologist, and an advocate of adult education. Final Director of the People's Institute of Cooper Union in New York City from 1922 to 1934.
- John C. Martin, member of the US House of Representatives from Illinois
- William Henry Milburn, Chaplain of the United States House of Representatives in 1845 and Chaplain of the Senate 1893–1903
- James A. Meeks, US Congressman from Illinois, attended as a member of the Class of 1889, received honorary degree of Master of Arts in 1925
- Richard Henry Mills, United States federal judge
- James O. Monroe, Illinois state legislator and newspaper editor
- Theodore Nevin Morrison, 20th century bishop in the Protestant Episcopal Church in the United States of America
- Floyd Newkirk, pitcher for the New York Yankees
- Marshall M. Parks, ophthalmologist known as "the father of pediatric ophthalmology"
- John Wesley Powell, explorer, scientist, politician, second director of U.S. Geological Survey
- Charlotte Thompson Reid, radio personality, politician, former US House member
- John I. Rinaker, U.S. Representative from Illinois and a brigade commander in the Union Army during the American Civil War
- Bob Schillerstrom, DuPage County, Illinois Board Chairman
- Ralph Tyler Smith, Illinois politician, former US Senator
- Jonathan E. Spilman, a Kentucky lawyer, minister, and composer
- Ryan Tanner, a Tony Award-winning producer.
- Stephen Tharp, organist and composer
- William McKendree Springer, former US representative and chief justice of the United States Court of Appeals of Indian Territory
- William E. Williams, U.S. Representative from Illinois
- Richard Yates (1815–1873), United States Senator from Illinois (1865–1871)
- Richard Yates Jr. (1860–1936), 22nd Governor of Illinois

== Notable faculty and staff ==
- Edward Beecher, first president of Illinois College
- Marion Elizabeth Blake, classical languages professor who is known for her work in researching the technology of Roman construction
- Theodore M. Brantley, longest-serving Chief Justice of the Montana Supreme Court, taught Ancient Languages
- Reuben Gaylord, taught and studied theology
- Kay Mills, journalist and author, lectured at Illinois College
- George R. Throop, Chancellor of Washington University in St. Louis from 1927 until 1944
- Jonathan Baldwin Turner, 1833–1847, botanist, abolitionist, Christian missionary
