= William C. Goudy =

American politician and attorney (1824–1893)

William Charles Goudy
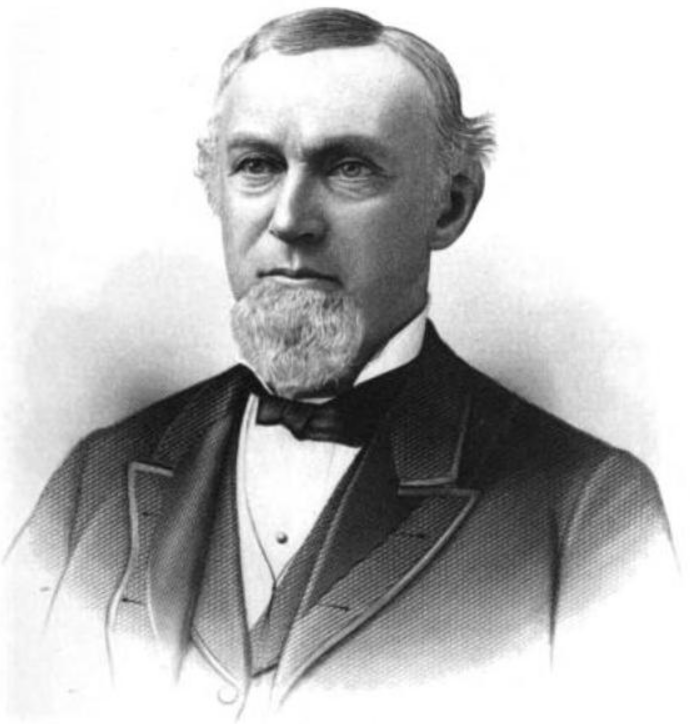

Member of the Illinois Senate from the 10th district
- In office 1856 – 1860
- Preceded by: James M. Campbell
- Succeeded by: William Berry

Personal details
- Born: May 15, 1824 Indiana, U.S.
- Died: April 29, 1893 (aged 68) Chicago, Illinois, U.S.
- Party: Democratic
- Profession: Attorney
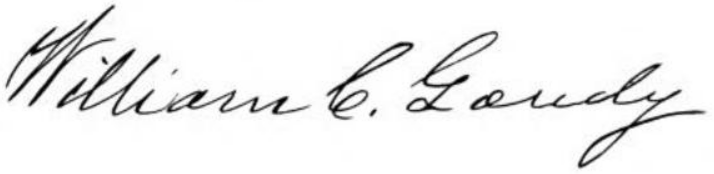
- Signature

William Charles Goudy (May 15, 1824 – April 29, 1893) was an American politician and attorney from Indiana. Arriving in Illinois in 1833, he matriculated at Illinois College and then studied law with Stephen T. Logan. He opened a successful law practice in Lewistown, Illinois and was elected district attorney in 1853. He was elected to the Illinois Senate, serving from 1856 to 1860. Goudy moved to Chicago, Illinois in 1859 and became consul for the Chicago and North Western Railway Company

== Biography ==
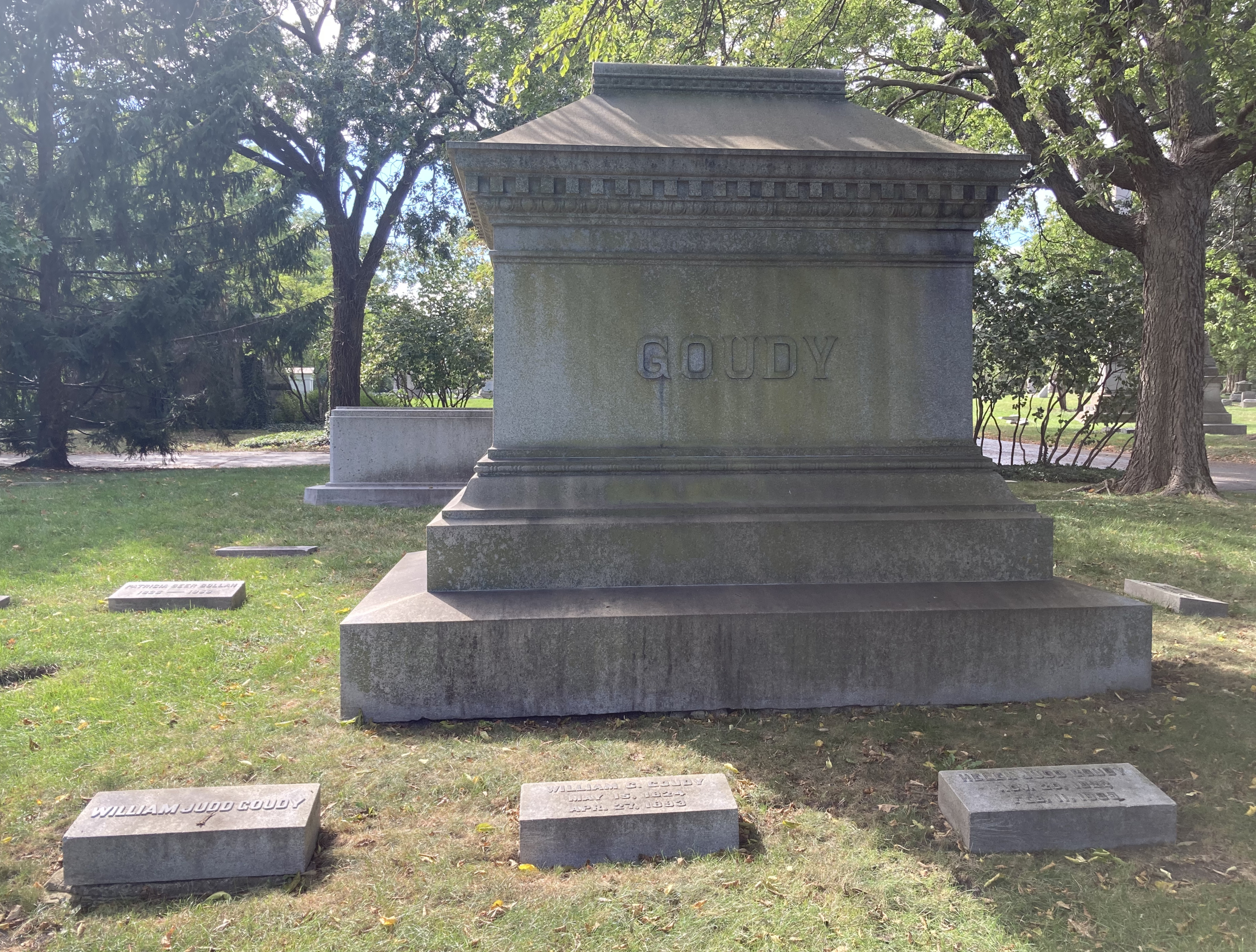
Goudy's grave, Graceland Cemetery

William Charles Goudy was born on May 15, 1824, in Indiana. He attended public schools and worked in his father's printing office. He arrived in Illinois with his family in 1833. Upon reaching adulthood, Goudy decided to pursue a career in law and enrolled at Illinois College in Jacksonville, Illinois. While there, he was a founder of Sigma Pi Literary Society. He graduated in 1845 and taught school in Decatur, Illinois. In 1843, he studied at the law office of Stephen T. Logan. There, Goudy became a close friend of Stephen's son David.

Goudy was admitted to the bar in 1847 and opened a practice with Hezekiah M. Wead in Lewistown, Illinois. He first took an interest in politics in 1849 and was elected district attorney of the 10th Judicial District four years later. He resigned in 1855 to announce his candidacy for the Illinois Senate. He was successful in his election bid and served two consecutive two-year terms as a Democrat from 1856 to 1860.

Goudy moved to Chicago, Illinois, in 1859 and became one of its prominent lawyers. He argued on behalf of Munn & Scott in the case that would later go to the Supreme Court of the United States as Munn v. Illinois. Likewise, he argued in lower courts for Wabash, St. Louis & Pacific Railway Company v. Illinois and Bowman v. Chicago & North Western Railway Company; he served as general counsel for the rail line. In 1862, he was a candidate for the United States Senate, but Goudy lost in the primaries to William Alexander Richardson. He was a delegate for the 1868 and 1888 Democratic National Conventions.

Goudy married Helen M. Judd in 1849 and they had two children. Late in his life, Goudy was a member of the National Democratic Committee. He was also a trustee of the McCormick Theological Seminary. Goudy died in his office at the Chicago and North Western of an apparent heart attack on April 29, 1893. He was buried in Graceland Cemetery in Chicago.

Goudy was the first President of the Chicago Bar Association in 1874.
