= Beecher Hall =

United States historic place in Jacksonville, Illinois

- Beecher Hall, Illinois College
- U.S. National Register of Historic Places
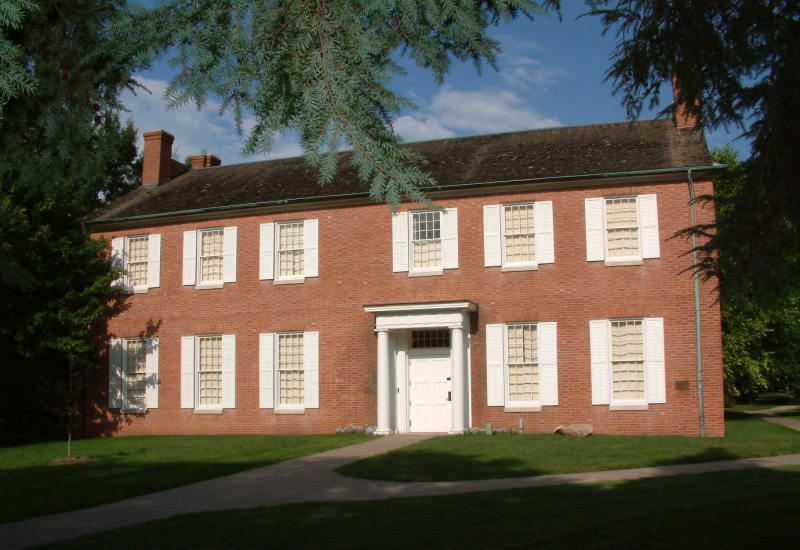
- Beecher Hall from the northeast

- Location within Illinois Location within the United States
- Location: Illinois College campus, Jacksonville, Illinois
- Coordinates: 39.7312°N 90.2486°W
- Area: 1 acre (0.40 ha)
- Built: 1829
- Architect: Kerr, James
- Architectural style: Early Republic, Late Georgian
- NRHP reference No.: 74000769
- Added to NRHP: April 8, 1974

Beecher Hall is the oldest building on the campus of Illinois College in Jacksonville, Illinois. Built in 1829–30, it was the first college building erected in the state of Illinois. The building has served many functions for Illinois College, including housing the first medical school in Illinois in 1843. It is named after the first president of Illinois College, Edward Beecher. Beecher Hall is recognized by the National Park Service as being a stop on the Underground Railroad. The building is listed on the National Register of Historic Places.

== History ==
Chartered in 1829, Illinois College was one of the first three colleges chartered in Illinois. It began constructing Beecher Hall the same year, and its first classes took place there on January 4, 1830, before the building was even finished. The college named its first building for its first president, Dr. Edward Beecher, the brother of abolitionist Henry Ward Beecher and author Harriet Beecher Stowe.

Beecher Hall served in several capacities for the school through the years, including a dormitory, a library, a fraternity house, and a meeting place for campus literary societies. The building also housed the college's medical school, the first of its kind in Illinois, from 1843 to its discontinuation in 1848. In 1859, the university assigned the second floor of Beecher Hall for the use of Sigma Pi Literary Society. Its lower level was given to Phi Alpha Literary Society. Both societies still occupy their rooms there, as of 2024.

Like his siblings, Edward Beecher was an active abolitionist, and Illinois College was the de facto headquarters of Illinois' antislavery movement. As part of the school's activism, Beecher Hall was a stop on the Underground Railroad. As many Central Illinois residents were pro-slavery before the Civil War, the school and its students faced criticism and threats for its participation in the abolition movement. One student, Samuel Willard, was fined for his participation in freeing an escaped slave. Beecher Hall is now part of the National Park Service's Network to Freedom, an association of historic sites linked to the Underground Railroad.

The building was listed on the National Register of Historic Places on April 8, 1974. The U.S. Postal Service released a 19-cent postal card featuring Beecher in 1993.
