= We Hail Thee Carolina =

Song
- Published: 1912
- Genre: Alma mater
- Composer(s): Jonathan Spilman
- Lyricist(s): George A. Wauchope

"We Hail Thee Carolina" is the alma mater of the University of South Carolina. It was adopted by the university in 1912 and is sung by alumni and students at Gamecock athletic events. The alma mater is also used to conclude each football game, home or away.

== History ==
The Gamecock reported in its March 1911 issue that very little progress had been made on the alma mater for the university despite a reward of $50 by the faculty. English professor, George A. Wauchope, took it upon himself and wrote the lyrics for the alma mater in 1911 set to the tune Flow Gently, Sweet Afton by Jonathan Spilman. Other songs were written and sung, but Wauchope's song proved to be the most popular and it was adopted by the university in 1912.

In recent years, while singing the phrase "Here's a health, Carolina," fans have raised their right hand as though raising a cup to offer a toast. The phrase "Here's a health" is an old term for a toast.

Since the turn of the millennium, Gamecock fans have adopted the last stanza, "Forever to thee," as a battle cry.

== Lyrics ==
"We hail thee, Carolina, and sing thy high praise

With loyal devotion, remembering the days

When proudly we sought thee, thy children to be:

Here's a health, Carolina, forever to thee!"
