= Kay Mills (writer) =

American journalist and author

- Born: Washington D.C.
- Died: Santa Monica, California
- Occupations: Journalist, author

Kay Mills (February 4, 1941 in Washington, D.C. – January 13, 2011) was an American journalist and author. When she joined the Los Angeles Times in 1978 she became one of the first women (and often the only one) on its editorial board.

Mills also revived the nearly lost stories of women journalists and civil rights icons. Her most famous book is This Little Light of Mine: The Life of Fannie Lou Hamer, a 1993 biography of the civil rights leader. Her other books are A Place in the News: From the Women’s Pages to the Front Page (1988), From Pocahontas to Power Suits: Everything You Need to Know About Women's History in America (1995), Something Better for My Children: The History and People of Head Start (1998), and Changing Channels: The Civil Rights Case That Transformed Television (2004).

== Early life and education ==
Mills was born in Washington, D.C. She recalled that although she was shy as a child, when she saw May Craig, the Maine newspaper correspondent, on Meet The Press, she figured that asking questions of newsmakers would be a good line of work for her. She was unaware of how rare Craig was, as a woman working in what was then a male-dominated profession. She graduated from Bethesda-Chevy Chase High School, a top school in the east at that time, in 1959.

She graduated from Pennsylvania State University in 1963 and got a master's degree in African history from Northwestern University in 1965. When she applied for a job at Newsweek's Chicago bureau in 1966, the bureau chief told her, "I need someone I can send anywhere, like to riots. And besides, what would you do if someone you were covering ducked into the men's room?"

== Career ==
Other employers were not so short-sighted. She became a broadcast news writer for United Press International in Chicago, then covered education and child welfare for the Baltimore Evening Sun. In 1970–71, she was assistant press secretary for U.S. Senator Edmund S. Muskie, then returned to journalism with the Washington bureau of the Newhouse newspapers.

After a Professional Journalism Fellowship at Stanford University, she joined the Los Angeles Times in 1978 and became one of the first women (and often the only one) on its editorial board. She later was assistant editor of its Sunday Opinion section. She left the Times in 1991 to write books and freelance full-time.

In addition to her newspaper jobs, Mills taught journalism and writing courses at George Mason University, the University of Southern California, the University of Minnesota and Princeton University, where she was a Ferris Professor. She has also lectured as an Alumni Fellow at Penn State, as a Woodrow Wilson Visiting Fellow at Berry College, Columbia College, and Illinois College, and as a Hearst Visiting Professional at the University of Missouri School of Journalism. She has chaired biography juries for both the Pulitzer Prize and the Los Angeles Times Book Prize. Mills served on the founding board of the Journalism and Women Symposium.

Her first book, A Place in the News: From the Women’s Pages to the Front Page, a 1988 history of women in journalism, is still used in college journalism and women's studies courses.

External videos
- Booknotes interview with Mills on This Little Light of Mine, February 28, 1993, C-SPAN

Her best-known book, This Little Light of Mine: The Life of Fannie Lou Hamer, a 1993 biography of the civil rights leader, was described by The New York Times as "a riveting biography...In making sure we see Fannie Lou Hamer in full, Kay Mills has done more than render a biography that is true to its subject. She has provided a history that helps us to understand the choices made by so many black men and women of Hamer's generation, who, unwilling to leave the South they grew up in, somehow found the courage to join a movement in which they risked everything." It received the Christopher Award in 1993 and the Julia Spruill Book Prize from the Southern Association of Women Historians for the best book on southern women's history published in 1993 and 1994. (University Press of Kentucky published a revised version of the book, with a foreword by Marian Wright Edelman, in 2007.)

She left the Los Angeles Times in 1991 to become a full-time author. Something Better for My Children: The History and People of Head Start (1998) was researched while on an Alicia Patterson Fellowship in 1995. Marian Wright Edelman, president of the Children's Defense Fund, called it "must reading for people who care about America’s children." Her other books included From Pocahontas to Power Suits: Everything You Need to Know About Women's History in America (1995) and Changing Channels: The Civil Rights Case That Transformed Television, (2004), the story of the successful challenge of the Jackson, Mississippi, TV station that failed to cover the civil rights movement.

== Death ==
She died at age 69 after a sudden heart attack in Santa Monica, California, where she lived. At the time, Mills was working on a mystery novel set in Paris.

== Books ==
- A Place in the News: From the Women’s Pages to the Front Page, 1988
- This Little Light of Mine: The Life of Fannie Lou Hamer, 1993
- From Pocahontas to Power Suits: Everything You Need to Know About Women's History in America, 1995
- Something Better for My Children: The History and People of Head Start, 1998
- Changing Channels: The Civil Rights Case That Transformed Television, 2004
