= Florence Eugene Baldwin =

American politician

Member of the Minnesota State Senate
- In office 1859–1861

Personal details
- Born: March 7, 1825 Bethany, Pennsylvania
- Died: November 3, 1886 (aged 61) St. Cloud, Minnesota
- Spouse: Elizabeth Wilkinson
- Children: 11
- Education: McKendree University, Illinois College

Florence Eugene Baldwin (March 7, 1825 – November 3, 1886) was a member of the Minnesota State Senate, and was the first Recording Secretary and a founding member of Phi Alpha Literary Society.

Baldwin was born in Bethany, Pennsylvania. He attended McKendree College, then moved to Illinois College in 1844. While at Illinois College he was a founding member of Phi Alpha Literary Society, and served on the three man committee that prepared its constitution. In 1851, he married Elizabeth Wilkinson, with whom he ultimately fathered 11 children. He was elected to the Minnesota State Senate on October 11, 1859, and served from 1859 to 1861. He also served several terms as a county attorney. He died in St. Cloud, Minnesota.
