= Henry Smith Van Eaton =

U.S. Representative from Mississippi (1826–1898)

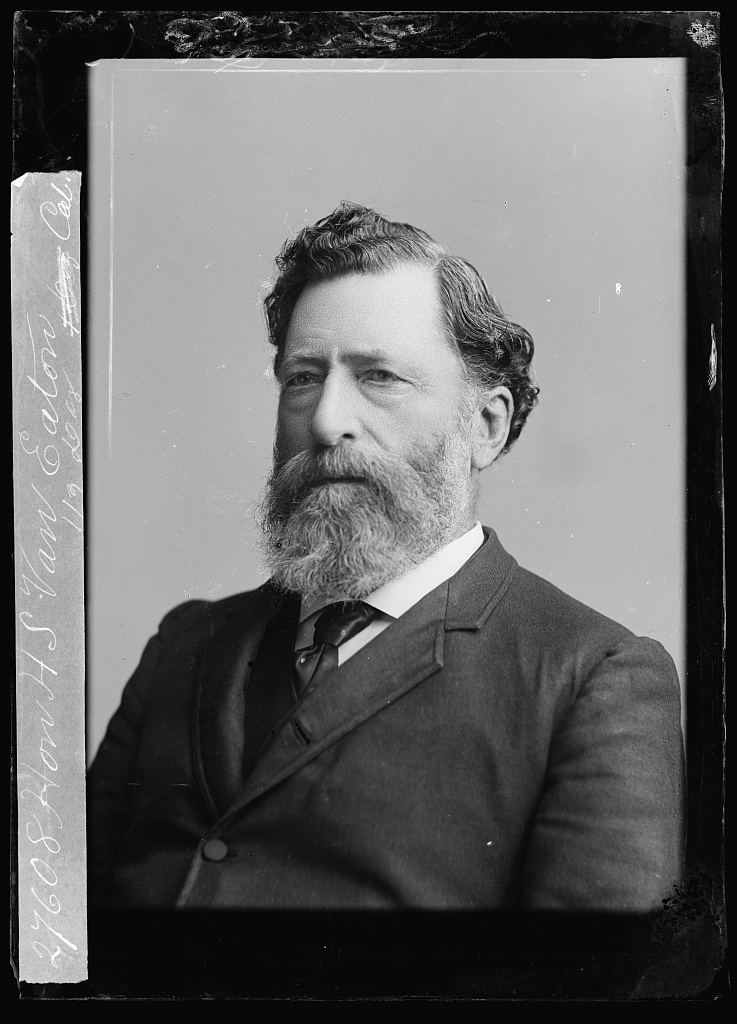

Member of the U.S. House of Representatives from Mississippi's 6th district
- In office March 4, 1883 – March 3, 1887
- Preceded by: John R. Lynch
- Succeeded by: T.R. Stockdale

Personal details
- Born: September 14, 1826 Anderson Township, Ohio, U.S.
- Died: May 30, 1898 (aged 71)
- Party: Democratic
- Education: Illinois College

Henry Smith Van Eaton (September 14, 1826 – May 30, 1898) was an attorney, politician and military officer, reaching the rank of captain in the Confederate Army. He was elected from Mississippi's 6th congressional district as U.S. Representative, serving 1883 to 1887.

== Early life and education ==
Van Eaton was born and raised in Anderson Township, Ohio. In 1848, he graduated from Illinois College, Jacksonville, Illinois, where he studied law. During this time, he became a founding member of Phi Alpha Literary Society. While an active member, he served as president and recording secretary.

In 1848, at 22 years, Van Eaton moved to Woodville, Mississippi, where he taught school. In 1855, he was admitted to the bar and began practicing law in Woodville, Wilkinson County.

In 1857, Van Eaton was elected district attorney. In 1859, he served as a member of the State House of Representatives.

When the American Civil War broke out, he enlisted in the Confederate States Army and served throughout the country, earning the rank of captain. In 1865, following his service in the war, he resumed the practice of law in Woodville.

In 1880, he was appointed chancellor of the tenth Mississippi district. Defeating the fusion candidate, he was elected in 1882 as a Democrat to the Forty-eighth and Forty-ninth Congresses (March 4, 1883 – March 3, 1887).

In 1887, Van Eaton was appointed to the Board of Visitors to the United States Naval Academy at Annapolis by President Grover Cleveland. He was appointed to another patronage position in 1888, serving as a member of a commission to examine and report upon the last completed portion of the Northern Pacific Railroad.

Van Eaton returned to Mississippi and practiced law. He died in Woodville, on May 30, 1898. He was interred in Evergreen Cemetery.

U.S. House of Representatives
Preceded by John R. Lynch	Member of the U.S. House of Representatives from Mississippi's 6th congressional district 1883–1887	Succeeded by T.R. Stockdale
