= Phi Alpha Literary Society =

Student group at Illinois College in Jacksonville, Illinois, US

- ΦΑ
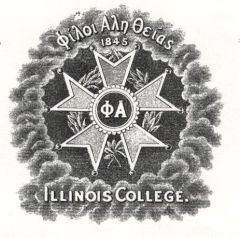
- Founded: September 25, 1845; 180 years ago Illinois College
- Type: Literary
- Affiliation: Independent
- Status: Active
- Scope: Local
- Motto: "Onward and Upward"
- Slogan: Lovers of Truth
- Colors: Blue and White
- Mascot: Sylvester (Sly) the Squirrel
- Chapters: 1
- Nickname: Phis
- Headquarters: Illinois College, Beecher Hall; 1101 W College Avenue; Jacksonville, Illinois 62650; United States

Phi Alpha (ΦΑ) is a men's Literary Society founded in 1845 at Illinois College in Jacksonville, Illinois. It conducts business meetings, literary productions, and other activities in Beecher Hall, the oldest college building in Illinois.

== History ==
"On Thursday evening, September 25, 1845, seven students from Illinois College gathered in a small room on the third floor of the old dormitory and made a momentous and historic decision. In order to unite a group of men whose ideas and principles were similar enough as to desire a common bond of fellowship, a new society was to be organized. Five days later the Immortal Seven drew up and adopted the constitution that proved to be the birth certificate of Phi Alpha Literary Society."

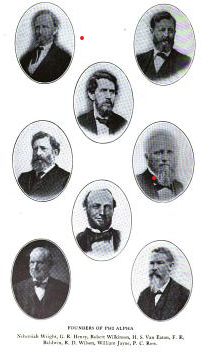
Founders of Phi Alpha Literary Society

The seven founders of Phi Alpha who are called the Immortal Seven were:

- Nehemiah Wright (February 20, 1824 – January 29, 1891) was born in Ashland, New Hampshire. He moved to Illinois at the age of 18 and attended Illinois College in 1845. While active he served as the society's second recording secretary. Wright married Frances L. Huckins in 1849, and they had 3 children together. Wright then moved to Chatham, Illinois on January 10, 1850. In 1865 he earned an M.D. degree from Rush Medical College in Chicago. In 1872 he was elected county physician of Sangamon County, Illinois. He was well known for his literary talent, and presented a well received poem at Phi Alpha's May 1876 reunion.
- Robert Davidson Wilson (January 1, 1826 – April 27, 1894) was born in Carmi, Illinois. He attended Illinois College from 1844 to 1850. He studied law with his father, William Wilson, chief justice of the Illinois Supreme Court. He died in Wallace, California.
- Robert Wilkinson (September 26, 1827 – September 30, 1893) was born in Hopkinsville, Kentucky in 1827 and moved to Illinois at a young age. He entered Illinois College in 1843 and while an active member of Phi Alpha he served as recording secretary and president. He was admitted to the Illinois Bar in 1849, and ultimately practiced law in the states of Illinois, Colorado, and Kansas. He served as Probate Judge of Doniphan County, Kansas for "about twenty years".
- William Jayne
- Florence Eugene Baldwin
- Henry Smith Van Eaton
- Greenbury Ridgely Henry (September 21, 1828 – May 14, 1885) was born in Hopkinsville, Kentucky. He attended Jubilee College, Illinois from 1841 to 1842, and Illinois College from 1844 to 1847. While attending Illinois College, Phi Alpha Literary Society was founded in his dorm room on September 30, 1845. He was chosen as temporary chairman of the organization in the days before its constitution was adopted. He then studied medicine at the University of Louisville and graduated in 1849. Soon after the Civil War began he was offered a surgeon's commission in the Union Army but declined it. He served as a member of the school board in Burlington, Iowa as well as a trustee of the Insane Hospital at Mount Pleasant, Iowa. On October 16, 1850, Henry married Catherine Chambers, of Jacksonville, Illinois. That same year he was a charter member of the Iowa State Medical Society and served as its first treasurer, an office that he held for three years. Henry published "various articles" in the Boston Medical Journal and in the Medico-Chirurgical Review of Philadelphia, Pennsylvania.

An eighth man associated with this founding was:

- Pike Clinton Ross (July 6, 1825 – December 7, 1890), was born in Lewistown, Illinois. He was the youngest child of Ossian M. Ross, Illinois pioneer and founder of Lewistown. Pike Ross was a brother of Hon. Lewis Winans Ross, a U.S. Representative from Illinois, and Leonard F. Ross, who served as a General in the Union Army during the American Civil War. Pike Ross attended Canton College in Canton, Illinois, from 1842 to 1843 and then Illinois College from 1845 to 1846. He served in the Mexican–American War as a private in the 4th Regiment of the Illinois Volunteer Infantry and took part in the battles of Veracruz and Cerro Gordo. He enlisted on July 4, 1846, and was mustered out on May 26, 1847. Pike studied medicine from 1851 to 1853 at Ohio Medical College in Cincinnati, Ohio. He practiced medicine in Havana, Illinois, for four years, and then returned to Canton to devote his time to managing his drugstore. In 1866, he married Margaret Irwin and fathered five children.

The founders formed this society in the room of Greenbury Ridgely Henry in the northeast corner of the third floor of the old dormitory. "Henry was chosen temporary chairman, while Baldwin, Jayne, and Wright were appointed a committee to prepare a constitution." The purpose of Phi Alpha Literary Society is concisely stated in its constitution. "The purpose of the society shall be the attainment of truth, literary improvement of her members, and the furthering of her democratic heritage." The society also strives to develop the social, communication, and leadership skills of the membership.

=== Abraham Lincoln ===
Phi Alpha has a notable connection with Abraham Lincoln. In the early years it was customary for the society to sponsor lectures throughout the school year, and the profits were used to expand the society's library. Dr. William Jayne, a founder of the society, was "a neighbor, political and social friend of Abraham Lincoln from 1836 until the latter's death in 1865" and was largely responsible for bringing Lincoln to town. As a result, Lincoln came to Jacksonville, Illinois and delivered a speech entitled "Discoveries and Inventions" on February 11, 1859. William Herndon, Lincoln's law partner and biographer, claimed the lecture was written to raise money after an expensive failed campaign for United States Senate against Stephen A. Douglas in 1858.

According to one contemporary account the lecture was "received with repeated and hearty bursts of applause", and another added that "the lecturer drew largely from his fund of spicy anecdotes and the lecture proved highly entertaining". Despite the apparently high entertainment value of Lincoln's lecture, attendance was low, and Phi Alpha did not raise much money selling tickets. Jayne chronicled what happened next in an address delivered to the Grand Army Hall and Memorial Association on February 12, 1900:

"Mr. Lincoln, with a kind smile, said to the president of the society, 'I have not made much money for you to-night.' In reply the president said, 'When we pay for the rent of the hall, music and advertising and your compensation, there will not be much left to buy books with for the library.' 'Well, boys, be hopeful; pay me my railroad fare and 50 cents for my supper at the hotel and we are square.'"

=== Debates ===
On May 5, 1881, Phi Alpha's debate victory over the Adelphi Society of Knox College was "one of the earliest of all intercollegiate debates in the country". The subject of the debate was prohibition. This event was celebrated in 1978 on the 150th anniversary of Illinois College with another debate against Knox College. This time the subject was "Resolved: That the Electoral College Should be Abolished."

In its early years, Phi Alpha was built on a broad democracy in the selection of its members. Phi Alpha members debated on both sides of the question of slavery. According to former president of the college Charles Rammelkamp, "the students who in later years got into trouble with the faculty on issues relating to the slavery question were usually members of Phi Alpha". The students who enrolled at Illinois College from the border states of Kentucky and Missouri usually joined Phi Alpha. During the Civil War, 104 members fought for the Union and 12 for the Confederacy.

== Symbols ==
Phi Alpha's motto is "Onward and Upward". Its slogan is "Lovers of Truth". Its colors are blue and white. Its mascot is Sylvester "Sly" the Squirrel. Its nickname is Phis.

== Activities ==
Phi Alpha hosts a number of literary functions throughout the year. Each semester, three judged Literary Productions are held. These judged meetings consist of five pieces given by society members to an audience. Pieces range from opinionated speeches to research presentations to original fiction. Also a Poet who is elected each semester will recite an original poem, and an impromptu speech is given on a subject revealed by the Critic during the meeting. A similar kind of meeting (called a Cooperative Literary Meeting) is held once a semester. It is composed of three Phis and three Illinois College faculty or staff members. This is intended to develop a stronger relationship with the campus community, and it provides a learning opportunity for the membership.

Phi Alpha also hosts public debates in the pursuit of the strengthening of communication skills. It also conducts weekly business meetings, which are conducted using Robert's Rules of Order. These meetings are intended to direct the everyday operations of Phi Alpha and also to serve the mission of Phi Alpha by practicing democratic principles.

== Notable members ==
- William Henry Barnes, United States House of Representatives, associate justice of the United States Supreme Court of Arizona Territory
- Paul Findley, United States House of Representatives,
- William Jayne, first Governor of the Dakota Territory and United States House of Representatives,
- Richard Henry Mills, judge in the United States District Court
- Ralph Tyler Smith, United States Senate
- William McKendree Springer, United States House of Representatives and chief justice of the United States Court of Appeals of Indian Territory
- Henry Smith Van Eaton, United States House of Representatives

=== Honorary members ===
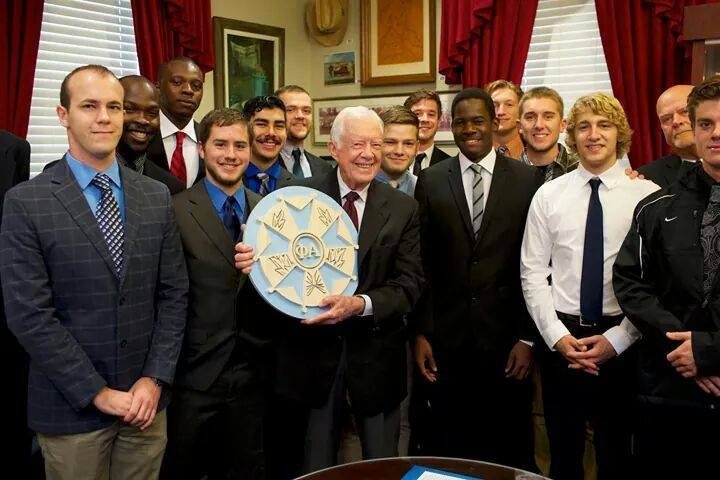
Jimmy Carter's honorary Induction

Ph Alpha has granted honorary membership to those whom it feels exhibit the characteristics of a society member. Often, such a person is first invited to give a literary production to the Phi Alpha membership.

- Jimmy Carter, President of the United States, inducted October 14, 2014
- Everett McKinley Dirksen, United States Senate, inducted June, 1967
- David Herbert Donald, professor and author, two-time Pulitzer Prize winner, inducted November 19, 2002
- Dick Durbin, United States Senate, inducted April 2, 2012
- Lee H. Hamilton, United States House of Representatives and director or the Woodrow Wilson International Center for Scholars, inducted April 24, 2008
- Rami Khouri, author, scholar, and commentator, inducted 2001
- Abraham Lincoln, President of the United States, inducted February 4, 1859
- Paul Simon, United States House of Representatives and United States Senate, inducted 1997
- Axel Steuer, president emeritus of Illinois College, inducted April 25, 2005
- Helen Thomas, White House correspondent, inducted April 7, 2010
