= Jonathan E. Spilman =

Jonathan Edwards Spilman
- Born: April 15, 1812; Greenville, Kentucky, U.S.
- Died: May 23, 1896 (aged 84); Flora, Illinois, U.S.
- Resting place: Elmwood Cemetery
- Education: Illinois College
- Occupation: Minister
- Spouse: Eliza Sarah Taylor
- Writing career
- Language: English

Jonathan Edwards Spilman (15 April 1812 – 23 May 1896) was a Kentucky lawyer, minister, and composer.

Jonathan Spilman was born in Greenville, Kentucky to Benjamin Spilman and Nancy (Rice) Spilman, and graduated from Illinois College in 1835. While at Transylvania Law School, 1837, he wrote the music for Robert Burns' "Flow gently, sweet Afton", the best remembered of his seven melodies. An adaptation of this music was used for "We Hail Thee Carolina", the alma mater of the University of South Carolina.

He was married to Mary V.J. Menefee, who died prematurely in 1843. Two years later, on 10 April 1845, he married Eliza Sarah Taylor (1822–1866), a niece of U.S. President Zachary Taylor. To them were born ten children, of whom six survived: Charles, Louise, William, Byrd, Clara, and Lewis. His wife Eliza died on 10 August 1866, as the result of a fire aboard the steamboat "Bostona No. 3" in Maysville, Kentucky.

Working as a lawyer for 18 years, he became a Presbyterian minister at the age of 46. A Historical Marker was erected in the city of Greenville in his memory.

== Bibliography ==
- Hoover, Earl Reese: J.E. Spilman — Kentucky's long-lost composer of a world-famous melody rediscovered. Kentucky State Historical Society, 1968.
