= Sigma Phi Epsilon Literary Society =

Student society at Illinois College in Illinois, US

- ΣΦΕ
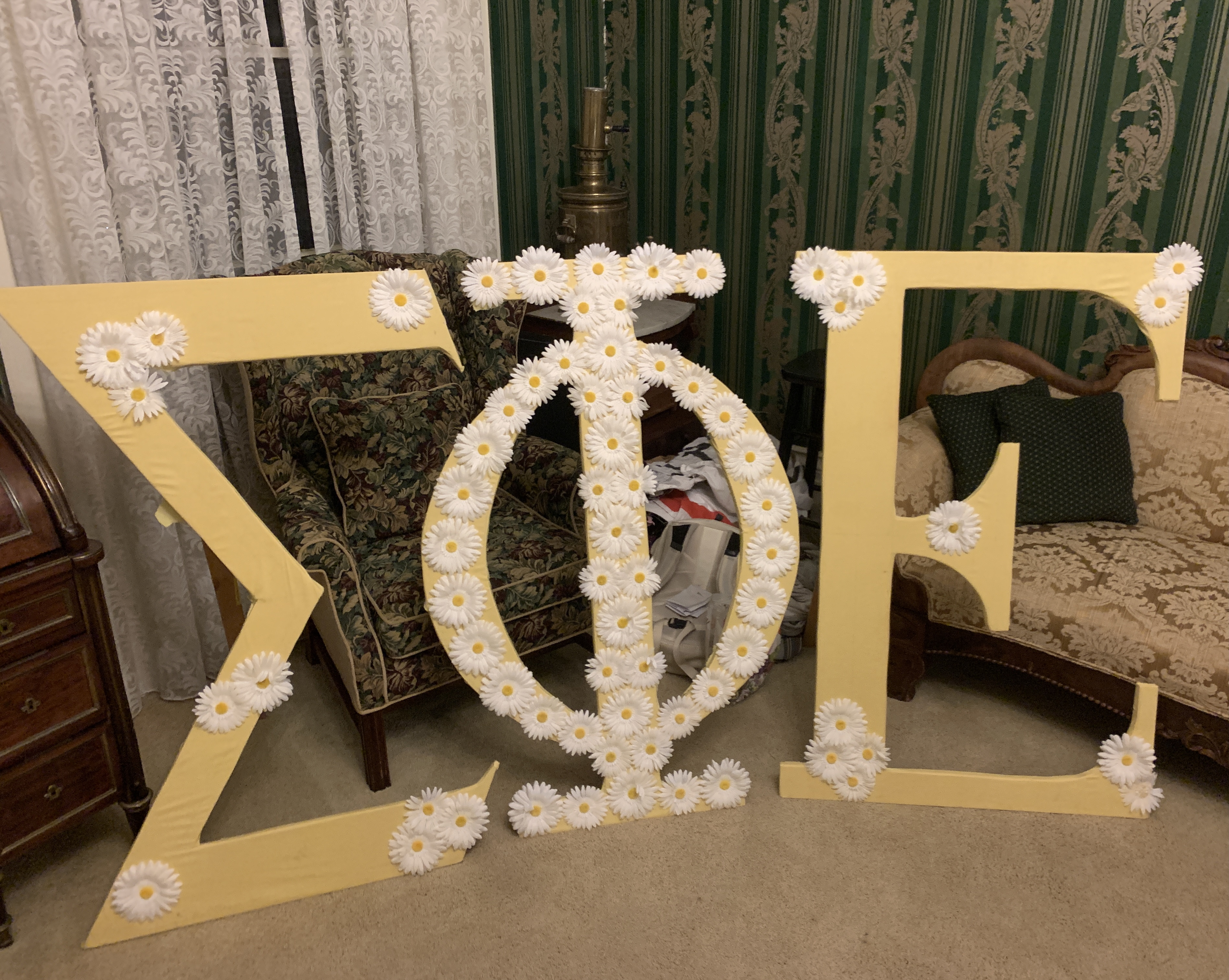
- Founded: January 22, 1916; 109 years ago Illinois College
- Type: Literary
- Affiliation: Independent
- Status: Active
- Scope: Local
- Motto: "Knowledge, Love, and Service"
- Colors: Yellow and White
- Flower: Daisy
- Chapters: 1
- Nickname: Phips
- Headquarters: 1101 West College Avenue; Jacksonville, Illinois 62650; United States
- Website: sigphips.wordpress.com/rush-sig-phips/

Sigma Phi Epsilon Literary Society (ΣΦΕ) is a female literary society at Illinois College in Jacksonville, Illinois. Sigma Phi Epsilon was founded on January 22, 1916. Sigma Phi Epsilon is headquartered on the top floor of the David A. Smith House on the college's campus.

== History ==
In 1903, women were permitted to attend Illinois College. As the number of female students at the college increased, there became a need for literary societies for these students. Students Lucy Gray Gatling, Frances Gatling, Bernice Wheeler, and Anna Pessel met to create a general plan for the new society.

On January 22, 1916, the founding members along with a small group of interested girls met on the first floor of Academy Hall and established Sigma Phi Epsilon Literary Society. It was the second of what would eventually be three female societies at Illinois College. The members decided that “the society would be founded not wholly as a literary society but to bring girls that they might be helped not only in their college life, but after they had finished college…the girls expressed it as their aim to unite with the other societies and friends of the college in making life more pleasant for the girls at Illinois College, and thus bring more girls to the college”.

During its first few years, Sigma Phi Epsilon used part of the first floor of Beecher Hall, Phi Alpha Literary Society's Trophy Room, for its meetings. The members, along with other women of the college, convinced the college that there needed to be a Women's Building. In 1924, the David A. Smith House became the property of Illinois College and was given to the female societies to use as their meeting place. Sigma Phi Epsilon was given a large room on the second floor of the house and still resides there today.

== Symbols ==
The Sigma Phi Epsilon motto is “Knowledge, Love, and Service." Its flower is the daisy. Its colors are yellow and white. Its nickname is Phips.

The first meeting of the new society was held around a round table. From this table, it was decided that the society pin should also be a circle to represent the complete circle of friendship. A pearl was added to the center to stand for the individual girl enclosed within the circle of friendship.

== Activities ==
Throughout the academic school year, Sigma Phi Epsilon participates in numerous community service projects including running bi-weekly Girl Scout meetings and volunteering at a local soup kitchen, Big Brothers Big Sisters, and the Ronald McDonald House. Sigma Phi Epsilon members also continue to participate in judged literary productions.

== See also ==
- College literary societies
