= Sweet Afton =

1791 poem by Robert Burns

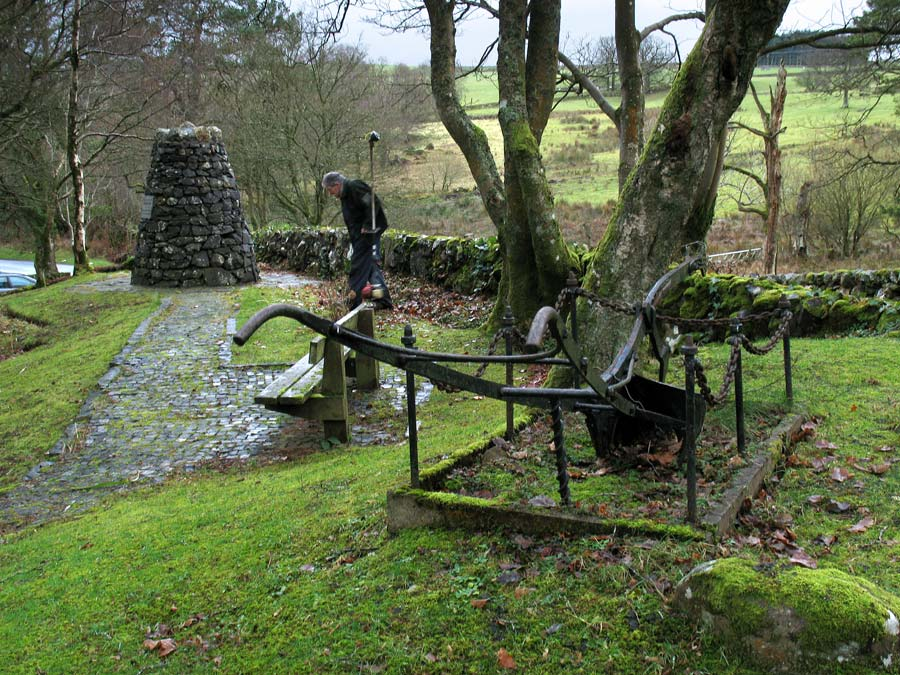
The Burns Cairn in Glen Afton; the inscription on the cairn says "Flow Gently Sweet Afton. Robert Burns 1759 - 1796. Erected by New Cumnock Burns Club (500) to mark its golden jubilee 1973."

"Sweet Afton" is a lyrical poem describing the Afton Water in Ayrshire, Scotland. It was written by Robert Burns in 1791. The poem was first published as a song in the Scots Musical Museum (1787–1803) and this is the best known version as sung throughout Scotland. The poem is also known as a song set to music in 1837 in the US by Jonathan E. Spilman; however, this is not the melody sung in Scotland.

"Sweet Afton" contains a number of monosyllables, which contribute to a gentle, soothing rhythm. It can be seen as a hymn for peace. The poem is in the metre 11 - 11 - 11- 11. The University of South Carolina uses the 1837 Spilman melody for their alma mater, "We Hail Thee Carolina".

The song is sung by Mary Bennet (played by Marsha Hunt) in the 1940 film version of Pride and Prejudice. It is also mentioned in Chapter IX of MacKinlay Kantor's Pulitzer Prize-winning novel Andersonville (1955). In the Andy Griffith Show episode “Mayberry Goes Hollywood” (1961) a citizen of Mayberry sings “Sweet Afton” to serenade a visiting Hollywood film producer. The song is the basis for much of the soundtrack of Genius (2016 film), which includes a jazz arrangement, "Swing Gently Sweet Harlem," by Adam Cork. It has also been recorded by Oli Steadman for inclusion in "365 Days Of Folk", and by Tony Cuffe. A modern recording of the song was produced by bluegrass band Nickel Creek in their eponymous 2000 release. "Nickel Creek - Sweet Afton"

In the town of New Cumnock in East Ayrshire there is a bridge across Afton Water on the A76 upon which there is a plaque commemorating Robert Burns and his poem.

The River Afton of New Cumnock gives its name to Glen Afton through which the river runs, which has connections with William Wallace, Robert the Bruce, Mary, Queen of Scots (1568), and Robert Burns. The Wallace seal attached to the Lubeck Letter of 1297 gives substance to the theory that Wallace's father was from Kyle Regis (this area) and a rock formation "up the glen" is named Castle William, supposedly after the Scottish patriot's fortification. The lyrics can be sung to the Christmas Carol “Away in a Manger”.
