= House at 36 Forest Street =

Historic house in Connecticut, United States

- U.S. National Register of Historic Places
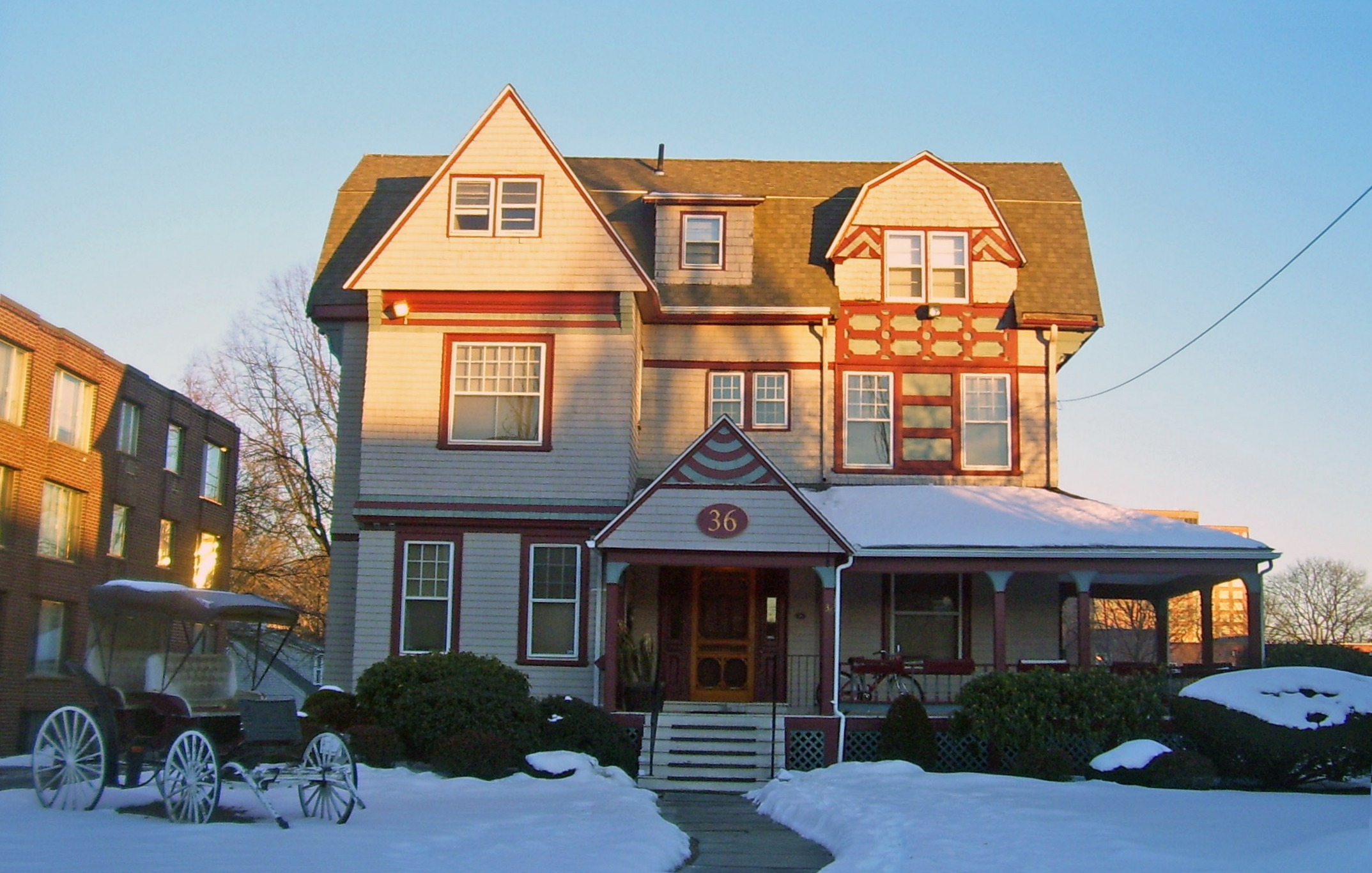
- West (front) elevation, 2009, with surrey

- Location within Connecticut Location within the United States
- Location: Hartford, CT
- Coordinates: 41°45′52″N 72°41′59″W
- Area: 16,000 square feet (1,500 m^{2})
- Built: ca. 1885
- Architectural style: Shingle Style
- MPS: Asylum Hill MRA
- NRHP reference No.: 83001261
- Added to NRHP: February 25, 1983

The house at 36 Forest Street, sometimes called the Burton House in Hartford, Connecticut, United States, is a wooden Shingle Style structure built in the late 19th century and largely intact today. It was listed on the National Register of Historic Places in 1983.

Originally it was built on land that had been transferred to a local insurance company by developers of the surrounding affluent Nook Farm neighborhood. They had been unable to make their mortgage payments, and so the lot was subdivided from one of their own properties. Later it was sold to one of the wealthy families that first settled the Asylum Hill neighborhood of Hartford. Most of the other houses from that time on Forest Street have been demolished to clear the way for newer construction, primarily apartment buildings. It is one of the few 19th-century houses left on the street. Currently it is rented out as apartments.

== Building ==
The house is located on the east side of the street, roughly 500 feet (150 m) north of the intersection with Hawthorn Street and a thousand feet north of the onramps over Forest from West Boulevard to the Interstate 84/U.S. Route 6 freeway. The house of Uncle Tom's Cabin author Harriet Beecher Stowe, also listed on the Register, is a similar distance to the north along the east side of Forest. Mark Twain's house for much of his later life, now a National Historic Landmark, is on the main street of the area, Farmington Avenue, two blocks away in the area now designated the Nook Farm and Woodland Street District.

Between 36 Forest and the Beecher Stowe House are modern three-story brick apartment buildings, similar to those south of the house. Hartford Public High School is across the street. Behind the house are parking lots and more brick apartment buildings, with other houses to the northeast and southeast. The latter is the home of suffragist Isabella Beecher Hooker and her husband John, another Register property in the area.

The building itself is a two-and-a-half–story shingle-sided wood frame house on a brick foundation. Its main block is a four-by-two-bay section with a gambrel roof intersected with a similar section projecting to the east (rear). A cross-gabled section intersects at the north end. Around the southeast corner is a porch sheltered by a shed roof with gabled portico at the main entrance; a small one-story shed-roofed ell is at the center of the rear. A curved walkway with shrubs on the south, complemented by a driveway on the north, lead across the front yard to the sidewalk and street.

Fenestration is irregular due to the many asymmetrical elements of the house form. On the west (front) facade many of the windows are set with nine-over-one double-hung sash windows; the exception is a wide one-over-one south of the main entrance, looking out onto the porch, and one-over-ones in the gabled projection at the north end of the attic and the shed dormer window that pierces the center of that section of roof between the gabled projection and a gambreled dormer. An oriel window projects from the center of the second story. It has an arched window surrounded by classical detailing, a wide frieze with garlands and swag on top and brackets on the bottom. Scroll brackets support the roof on the north and south ends.

Other decoration includes corbel-styled wood supports on the northeast gabled projection and a flared course of shingles separating the first and second stories below it. Another decorative course runs along the top of the other second-story windows and between the two on the south side. Between those windows and the sills of the two in the gambreled dormer is a decorative geometric woodwork pattern, with another decorative pattern on either side of the dormer's windows upper pane. Another pattern is located in the upper field of the front portico gable, above a large wooden oval "36". Smooth square wooden columns with flared capitals support the porch roof, interrupting an iron guardrail. Below the porch floor is wooden latticework.

== History ==
An 1853 house had stood on the site until it burned down in 1870. It had been the rented residence of the Rev. Nathaniel Judson Burton and his wife Rachel Pine Chase Burton. He was pastor of Hartford's Fourth Congregational Church and later Park Church until his death in 1887. After the fire the property remained vacant at least until 1885, when a map of the area shows a building at the site.

In the 1880s, the former Nook Farm area was one of Hartford's most desirable new neighborhoods, with a number of nationally prominent writers living within blocks of each other. Mark Twain lived on Farmington Street. Charles Dudley Warner, his coauthor on The Gilded Age: A Tale of Today, a satirical novel which lent its name to the era, lived nearby. Joseph Roswell Hawley, Civil War general, former governor and later publisher of the Hartford Courant, was also in the neighborhood. John Hooker, developer of the neighborhood, and his suffragist wife, Isabella, lived in their house that stands to the southeast on Hawthorne Street. Forest Street's homes, unlike those elsewhere in the Asylum Hill neighborhood which were developed later as smaller, middle-income properties, were large and spacious.

Some sources give the date of the current house's construction as 1895. That year John Hooker and his partner, Francis Gillette, encountered difficulty in paying off the mortgage on the Nook Farm properties. Their creditor, the Connecticut Mutual Life Insurance Company, instead insisted on a 90-by-180-foot (27 by 55 m) lot taken from Hooker's own, be conveyed to them. It was listed as the owner on next year's city atlas.

The company sold the land to A. Lyman Williston, who built the current house. Although the lot was small compared to the other Nook Farm properties, Williston was as wealthy as his neighbors, and the house he built reflects emerging tastes. Its architect is unknown, but its Queen Anne Style forms, with shingled sides, gambrel roofs, overhanging roofs and broad veranda reflect the early Shingle Style. The classical detailing shows the influence of the Free Classical mode that marked the later years of the Queen Anne Style. This prefigured the emergence of the Colonial Revival in the coming century.

A later resident of the house was the Burtons' son Richard. An English professor and poet, he compiled some of his father's lectures and sermons into a book later published as In Pulpit and Parish.

In 1909 the house was acquired by another local notable, Charles Starkweather. He was a member of Hartford's City Council, Alderman for the Tenth Ward, and a superintendent of the Hartford Trust Company, later part of the Bank of New England. It has since passed through other owners. In 1963, all 11 original Nook Farm houses across the street, including Warner's, were condemned and demolished for the construction of Hartford Public High School. Many of the other old houses on the east side met a similar fate when apartments were constructed.

The house at 36 Forest is thus one of the few remaining houses from the original Nook Farm development in its immediate neighborhood. At some time since the property was listed on the National Register in the early 1980s, the house was subdivided into apartments. The management firm, the Surrey Group, used the house as its offices, and had an actual surrey parked on the lawn during that time. In the late 2000s, the company moved to one of the nearby apartment buildings, also under its management, and took the surrey off the lawn.

== See also ==
- National Register of Historic Places listings in Hartford, Connecticut
