= Beecher =

Beecher may refer to:

== People ==
- Beecher (surname)

== Places ==
=== United States ===
- Beecher, Illinois
- Beecher, Michigan, a census-designated place and unincorporated community near Flint
- Beecher, Wisconsin, a town
- Beecher (community), Wisconsin, an unincorporated community
- Beecher Lake, Wisconsin, an unincorporated community
- Beecher Island, along the Arikaree River in Colorado

=== Other places ===
- Beecher, Queensland, Australia, a locality in the Gladstone Region

== Entertainment ==
- Little John Beecher and His Orchestra
- Beecher (band), from Manchester, England

== See also ==
- Beecher's (disambiguation)
