= Day House (Hartford, Connecticut) =

Historic house in Connecticut, United States

- U.S. National Register of Historic Places
- U.S. Historic district – Contributing property
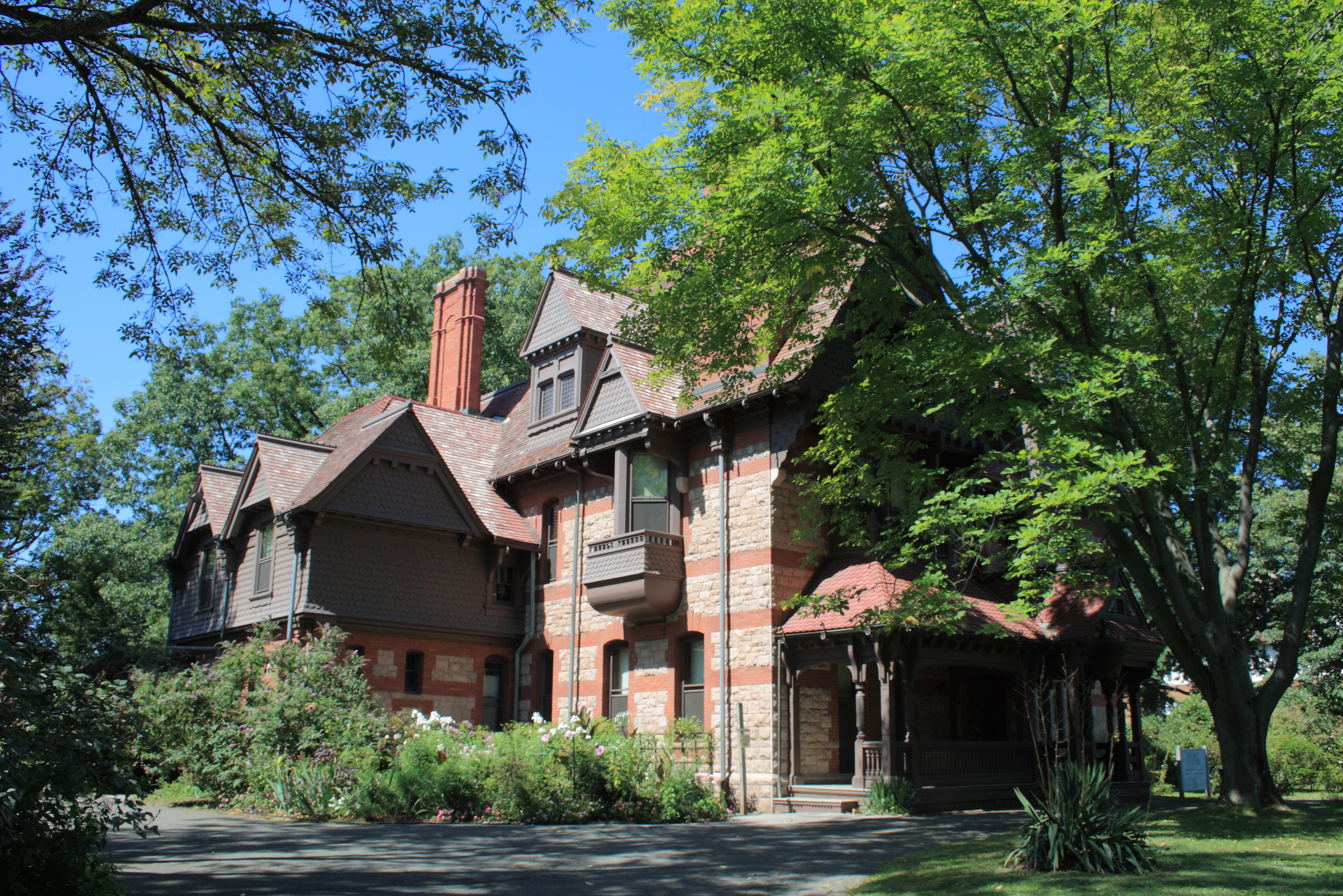

- Location within Connecticut Location within the United States
- Location: 77 Forest Street, Hartford, Connecticut
- Coordinates: 41°46′3″N 72°42′2″W
- Area: 2 acres (0.81 ha)
- Built: 1884
- Architect: Francis H. Kimball
- Architectural style: Queen Anne
- Part of: Nook Farm and Woodland Street District (ID79002674)
- NRHP reference No.: 71000909

Significant dates
- Added to NRHP: April 16, 1971
- Designated CP: November 29, 1979

The Katharine Seymour Day House is a historic house at 77 Forest Street in the historic Nook Farm district of Hartford, Connecticut. Built in 1884 for a local businessman seeking to compete stylistically with the adjacent Mark Twain House, it is a good local example of Queen Anne architecture. It now serves as the administrative center and library for the Harriet Beecher Stowe Center. It was listed on the National Register of Historic Places in 1971.

== Description and history ==
The Katharine Seymour Day House is located in the Nook Farm area of Hartford's Asylum Hill neighborhood, at the southwest corner of Farmington Avenue and Forest Street. It is just east of the Mark Twain House, and north of the Harriet Beecher Stowe House. The house is a 2 1/2-story stone structure, built out of a multicolored combination of brownstone and limestone. It is a fine local example of Queen Anne Victorian architecture, with a busy exterior in terms of color and organization, with projecting gables, dormers and porches. The interior features high quality woodwork, plasterwork and tile.

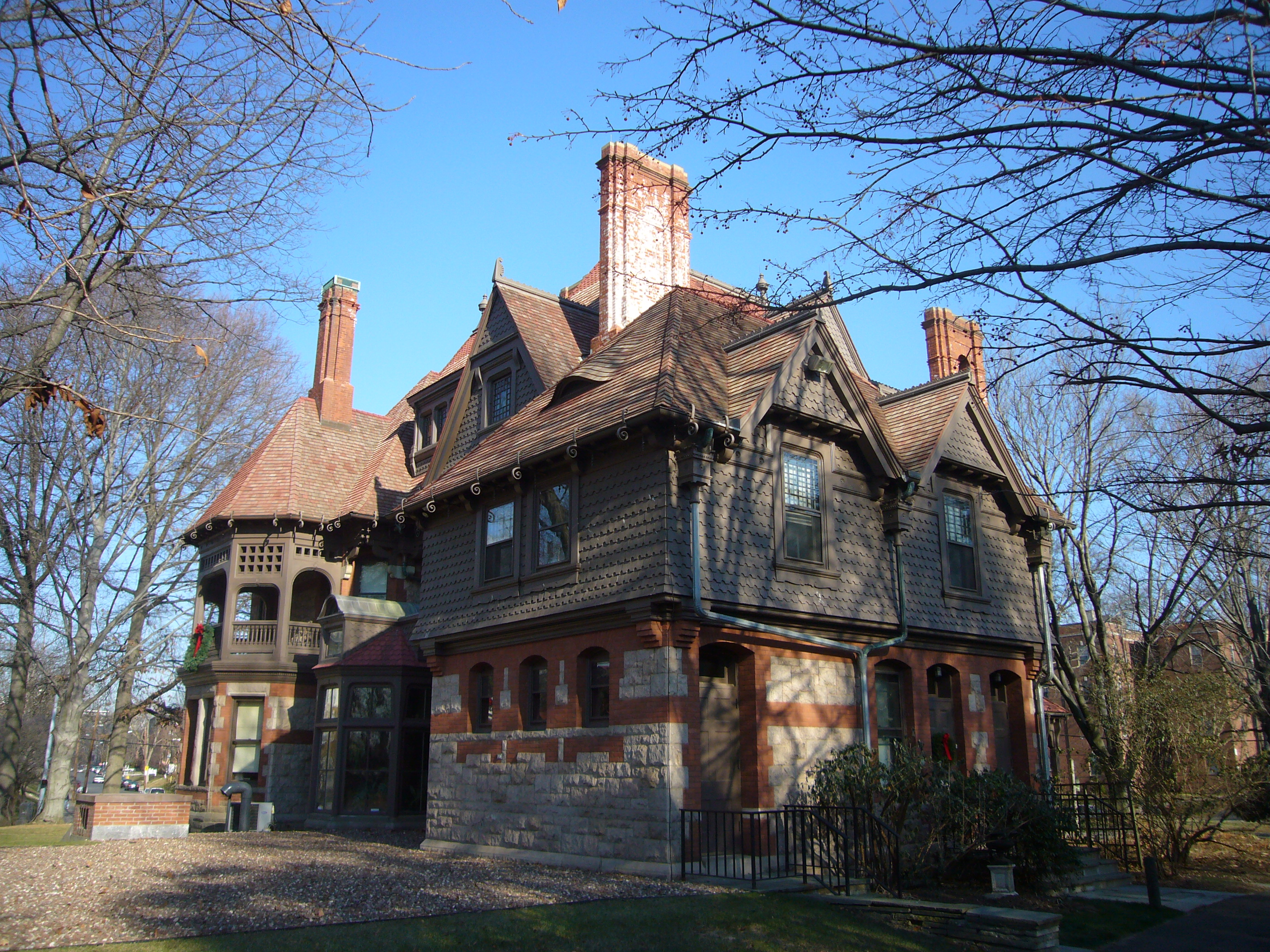
Day House

The house was designed by Francis H. Kimball and was built for Franklin Chamberlin; the project was completed in 1884. Chamberlin is believed to have built the house as a rival to the adjacent Mark Twain House; he had previously sold the adjacent land to Mark Twain on which his house was built. The house was later owned by Willie Olcott Burr, publisher of The Hartford Times newspaper. It was purchased by Harriet Beecher Stowe's grandniece Katharine Seymour Day in 1940, as part of a plan to preserve the surroundings of the Stowe House (which was also originally built for Chamberlin). Day established the Harriet Beecher Stowe Center in 1941 as a nonprofit vehicle to preserve Stowe's legacy.

The house now houses the center's administrative offices, and a research library containing many of Stowe's materials.

== See also ==
- National Register of Historic Places listings in Hartford, Connecticut
