= John and Isabella Hooker House =

Historic house in Connecticut, United States

- U.S. National Register of Historic Places
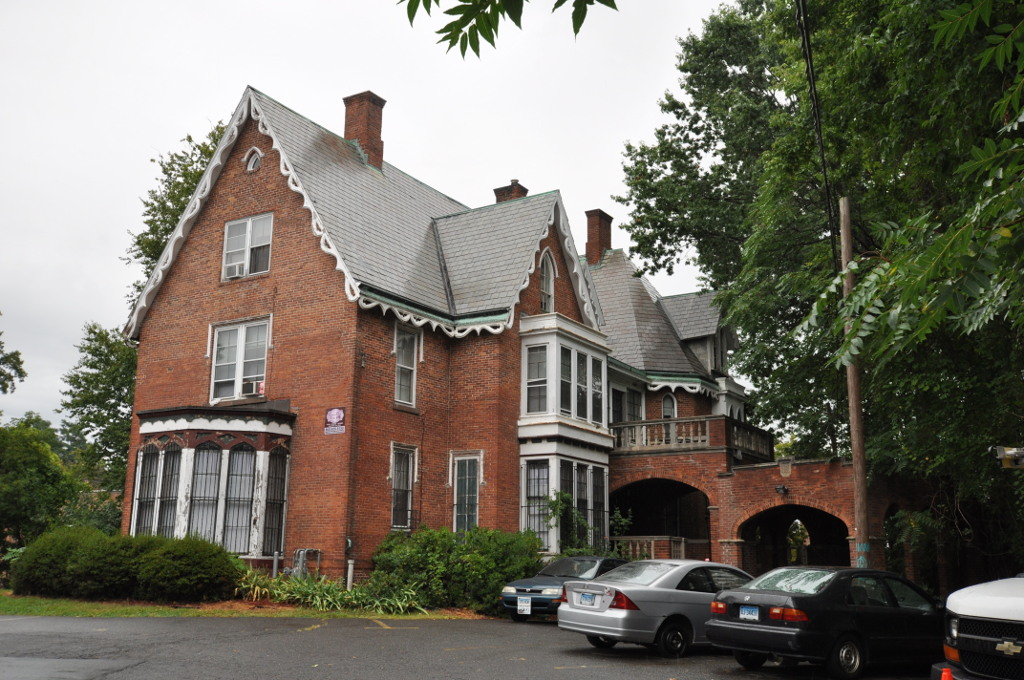

- Location within Connecticut Location within the United States
- Location: 140 Hawthorn Street, Hartford, Connecticut
- Coordinates: 41°45′37″N 72°42′5″W
- Area: less than one acre
- Built: 1861
- Architect: Jordan, Octavius
- Architectural style: Gothic villa
- MPS: Asylum Hill MRA
- NRHP reference No.: 79002678
- Added to NRHP: November 29, 1979

The John and Isabella Hooker House is a historic house at 140 Hawthorn Street in Hartford, Connecticut. Built in the 1850s and twice enlarged, it is a distinctive and large example of Italianate country villa architecture. It was listed on the National Register of Historic Places in 1979.

== Description ==
The Hooker House is located in Hartford's Asylum Hill neighborhood, near the southern end of a block bounded by Forest, Hawthorn, and South Marshall Streets. It is set back from each of these roads, and its location is obscured by apartment buildings that have been built on its former estate grounds. It is a large 2 1/2-story brick building trimmed in brownstone, with a roughly L-shaped plan. It has a gabled roof encrusted with a variety of projecting dormers and gable sections. All of these are adorned with carved vergeboard, which effectively encircles the building. Windows in these projections are Gothic lancet-style pointed arch windows.

The land for the house, then farmland, was bought in 1853 by John and Isabella Hooker, and construction of the house took place afterward. It was designed in the Italian villa style popularized by Andrew Jackson Downing and Calvert Vaux. In the 1860s it was enlarged to a plan by Octavius Jordan, a local builder also credited with construction of the Harriet Beecher Stowe House. It was the first house to be built in the Nook Farm part of Hartford, where a number of similar fine country villas were built, including the Stowe house and the Mark Twain House. Originally 1 1/2 stories in height, the roof was raised in 1906 to add a stylistically sympathetic second story.

== See also ==
- National Register of Historic Places listings in Hartford, Connecticut
