= Nook Farm =

Nook Farm may refer to:

- Nook Farm (Manchester), an estate of council houses in Syke, Rochdale, England
- Nook Farm (Connecticut), a historical neighborhood in Asylum Hill, Hartford, Connecticut, United States
