= Katharine Seymour Day =

Katharine Seymour Day (May 8, 1870 - June 4, 1964) was an American preservationist from Hartford, Connecticut. She worked as a member of the Hartford City Planning Commission to preserve historic homes in Connecticut and helped establish the Children’s Museum of Hartford and the home of Mark Twain as a memorial. She served as president of the Mark Twain Library and Memorial Commission. She was inducted into the Connecticut Women's Hall of Fame in 1994. The Katharine Seymour Day House has been preserved as part of the Harriet Beecher Stowe House Museum.

== Early life and education ==
Day was born in Hartford, Connecticut on May 8, 1870, to Alice Beecher Hooker Day and John Calvin Day. She was a granddaughter of Isabella Beecher Hooker and a grandniece of Harriet Beecher Stowe. She attended Hartford Public High School but left in 1887 when her family moved to Europe. She became interested in painting while living in Europe and studied the Pointillism technique in Paris and exhibited her work there. In 1896 she moved to New York City and studied art under William Merritt Chase. She returned to Paris to study at the Academie Julian. She moved back to New York after the death of her father and worked with the New York Women's Municipal League to defeat Tammany Hall. She returned to school in 1918 and received her master's degree in psychology from Radcliffe College at the age of 52. She received a graduate degree in history from Trinity College in 1936 when she was 66.

== Career ==
Katharine Seymour Day house

In 1924, Day purchased and lived in the home of her great-aunt Harriet Beecher Stowe in Hartford, Connecticut; this became the Harriet Beecher Stowe House museum in 1968. Her preservation work led her to save many structures, including the Harriet Beecher Stowe House, the Mark Twain House, and what is now referred to as the Katharine Seymour Day House (which she purchased in 1941 and which would eventually be incorporated into the Harriet Beecher Stowe Center). All these buildings are located near the intersection of Farmington Avenue and Forrest Street in Hartford, Connecticut.

Day died on June 4, 1964, in Hartford, Connecticut, at the age of 94; Her body was interred in Cedar Hill Cemetery (Hartford, Connecticut).

== Legacy ==
She was inducted into the Connecticut Women's Hall of Fame for her work in historical preservation and women's suffrage.
