= Beeche =

Beeche is a surname. Notable people with the surname include:

- Ricardo Castro Beeche (1894–1967), Costa Rican lawyer, politician, and writer
- William Beeche (fl. 1386), English politician

== See also ==
- Beech
- Beecher (surname)
