= Beecher (surname) =

Beecher is a surname. Notable people with the surname include:

- Beecher family, prominent New England family, consisting of:
  - Lyman Beecher, American clergyman, father of:
    - Catharine Beecher, educator
    - Charles Beecher, minister
    - Edward Beecher, theologian
    - Harriet Beecher Stowe, abolitionist and novelist
    - Henry Ward Beecher, clergyman
    - Isabella Beecher Hooker, leader in the women's suffrage movement
- Charles Emerson Beecher (1856–1904), American paleontologist
- Franny Beecher (1921–2014), guitarist for Bill Haley and His Comets
- George A. Beecher (1868–1951), American religious leader from Nebraska
- Gordon Beecher, American composer
- Henry K. Beecher, physician
- John Beecher (disambiguation)
- Philemon Beecher, American politician from Ohio

== Other uses ==
- "BEECHER", a hymn tune by John Zundel named for Henry Ward Beecher
- Tobias Beecher, fictional character of the TV show Oz
- Giles Beecher Jackson (1853–1924), African-American lawyer, newspaper publisher, entrepreneur, and civil rights activist

== See also ==
- Beacher, surname
- Beecher's (disambiguation)
