= Beecher Lake, Wisconsin =

- Unincorporated community
- Location within Wisconsin Location within the United States
- Coordinates: 45°34′09″N 87°59′51″W
- Country: United States
- State: Wisconsin
- County: Marinette
- Elevation: 951 ft (290 m)
- Time zone: UTC-6 (Central (CST))
  - Summer (DST): UTC-5 (CDT)
- Area codes: 715 & 534
- GNIS feature ID: 1577511

Beecher Lake is an unincorporated community located in the town of Beecher, Marinette County, Wisconsin, United States. Beecher Lake is located at the intersection of U.S. Route 141, County Highway L, and the Escanaba and Lake Superior Railroad; it is 1.3 miles (2.1 km) south of the community of Beecher and 14 miles (23 km) north of Wausaukee.
