= Beacher =

Beacher is a surname. Notable people with the surname include:

- James Beacher (born 1987), English footballer
- Jeff Beacher (born 1973), American entertainment producer

== See also ==
- Beecher (surname)
