= Beecher's =

Beecher's may refer to:

- Beecher's Bibles, rifles given to anti-slavery immigrants in Kansas, United States in the mid-19th century
- Beecher's Handmade Cheese, an artisan cheese maker in Seattle, Washington, United States.
- Beecher's Trilobite Bed, fossil bearing location in New York state, United States.
- Beecher's Trilobite type preservation, the preservation of the Beecher's Trilobite Bed.

Surname

- Billy Beechers, English footballer

== See also ==
- Becher's Brook, a fence on the Grand National horseracing course, England
- Beecher (disambiguation)
