= Gordon Beecher =

American composer, author and vice admiral

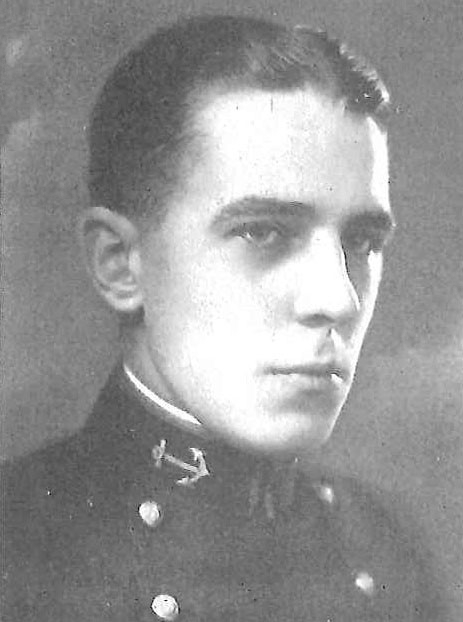
- Born: William Gordon Beecher Jr. January 19, 1904; Baltimore, Maryland, U.S.
- Died: December 7, 1973; Alexandria, Virginia, U.S.
- Burial place: Arlington National Cemetery
- Military career
- Allegiance: United States of America
- Branch: United States Navy
- Service years: 1921–1955
- Rank: Vice Admiral
- Commands: Director, USNA Musical Clubs, 1933-1935; Commanding officer USS Pruitt (DM-22), then a minesweeper, 31 May 1940 through 2 December 1941; Commander of the Middle East Force in 1954; Chief of Naval Information in 1954-1955
- Conflicts: World War II; Pearl Harbor; Iwo Jima; Okinawa
- Awards: Legion of Merit

William Gordon Beecher Jr. (January 19, 1904 in Baltimore, Maryland – December 7, 1973) was an American composer, writer and vice admiral. Many of his musical arrangements were done in cooperation with Johnny Noble.

== Military career ==
Beecher was educated at the United States Naval Academy and at the National War College. He served 34 years in the United States Navy, retiring as a vice admiral in 1955. In World War II, Beecher commanded a destroyer squadron, and fought at Pearl Harbor, Iwo Jima, and Okinawa. He received the Legion of Merit.

== Creative work ==
Between 1933 and 1935, Beecher directed the USNA Musical Clubs and joined the American Society of Composers, Authors and Publishers in 1944. He composed around 700 songs. Known compositions, many of which he published under the pseudonym "Gordon Beecher", are "A Song of Old Hawaii", "Sing an American Song", "Counting On You", "All Pau Now", "Nimitz, Halsey and Me", "Just a Happy Kama'aina" and "The Ramparts We Watch". He served as technical advisor for the movie Shipmates Forever produced by Warner Bros.

Beecher died in 1973 and is buried at the Arlington National Cemetery.

== Awards ==
- Legion of Merit
- Commendation Ribbon awarded by the Secretary of the Navy
- Second Nicaraguan Campaign Medal
- American Defense Service Medal
- Fleet Clasp
- Asiatic-Pacific Campaign Medal with four engagement stars
- American Campaign Medal
- World War II Victory Medal
- Navy Occupation Service Medal
- Asia Clasp
- National Defense Service Medal
