= Harriet Beecher Stowe House (Hartford, Connecticut) =

History Museum in Connecticut, United States

- Stowe Center for Literary Activism
- U.S. National Register of Historic Places
- U.S. National Historic Landmark
- U.S. Historic district – Contributing property
- (2026)
- Location: Hartford, Connecticut
- Coordinates: 41°46′1.14″N 72°42′2.81″W
- Built: 1871
- Architectural style: Gothic
- Website: www.harrietbeecherstowecenter.org
- Part of: Nook Farm and Woodland Street District (ID79002674)
- NRHP reference No.: 70000710

Significant dates
- Added to NRHP: October 6, 1970
- Designated NHL: February 27, 2013
- Designated CP: November 29, 1979

The Stowe Center for Literary Activism is a history museum and National Historic Landmark at 73 Forest Street in Hartford, Connecticut that was once the home of Harriet Beecher Stowe, author of the 1852 novel Uncle Tom's Cabin. Stowe lived in this house for the last 23 years of her life. It was her family's second home in Hartford. The 5,000 sq ft (460 m^{2}) cottage-style house is located adjacent to the Mark Twain House and is open to the public. It was listed on the National Register of Historic Places in 1970, and declared a National Historic Landmark in 2013.

== Description ==
The Stowe House is a two-story brick building, painted gray, resting on a brick foundation. Although the house is basically rectangular, it has a complex roof, with a jerkin-headed gable running parallel to the street, a hip-roof extension to the rear, and small dormers flanking a central dormer flush to the front facade. The gables are decorated with bargeboard, and the eaves have Italianate brackets. The interior of the house follows a fairly conventional center hall plan, with two parlors, dining room, kitchen, and pantry on the first floor, and bedrooms on the second. Though Harriet Beecher Stowe and her family had previously lived in several other homes, Oakholm was the first constructed specifically for them.

== History ==
Harriet Beecher Stowe had been living in Massachusetts with her husband Calvin Ellis Stowe, who taught at the Andover Theological Seminary. When Calvin gave his resignation, effective in August 1863, Harriet set to work preparing their first home in Hartford. Fluctuating costs caused by the American Civil War made the project difficult but Harriet enjoyed supervising the work. She wrote to her publisher James T. Fields, "I go every day to see it—I am busy with drains sewers sinks digging trenching—& above all with manure!—You should see the joy with which I gaze on manure heaps to which the eye of faith sees Delaware grapes & D'Angouleme pears & all sorts of roses & posies". She named the building "Oakholm". The home was complete enough that, by May 1, 1864, she wrote, "I came here a month ago to hurry on the preparations for our house, in which I am now writing, in the high bow-window of Mr. Stowe's study, overlooking the wood and river. We are not moved in yet, only our things, and the house presents a scene of the wildest chaos, the furniture having been tumbled in and lying boxed and promiscuous."

By 1873, however, Oakholm became too expensive to maintain, and the Stowes sold the house and moved to this home on Forest Street. The home was originally built by Franklin Chamberlin, who had also sold the adjacent land to Mark Twain upon which the Mark Twain House was built.

Stowe remained in the home for the last 23 years of her life. Among the works she published while living here was Pogunuc People (1878). She maintained an active career; in addition to her writing, she also embarked on two lecture tours while living in the house. She also pushed for support of the local Wadsworth Atheneum and assisted in establishing the Hartford Art School, now part of the University of Hartford.

Stowe died in her upstairs bedroom in the house in 1896 with several of her children, her sister Isabella Beecher Hooker, and other family members at her side.

== The Stowe Center for Literary Activism ==
"The Stowe Center for Literary Activism preserves and interprets Stowe’s Hartford home and the Center’s historic collections, promotes vibrant discussion of her life and work, and inspires commitment to social justice and positive change." (Mission Statement of the Harriet Beecher Stowe Center)

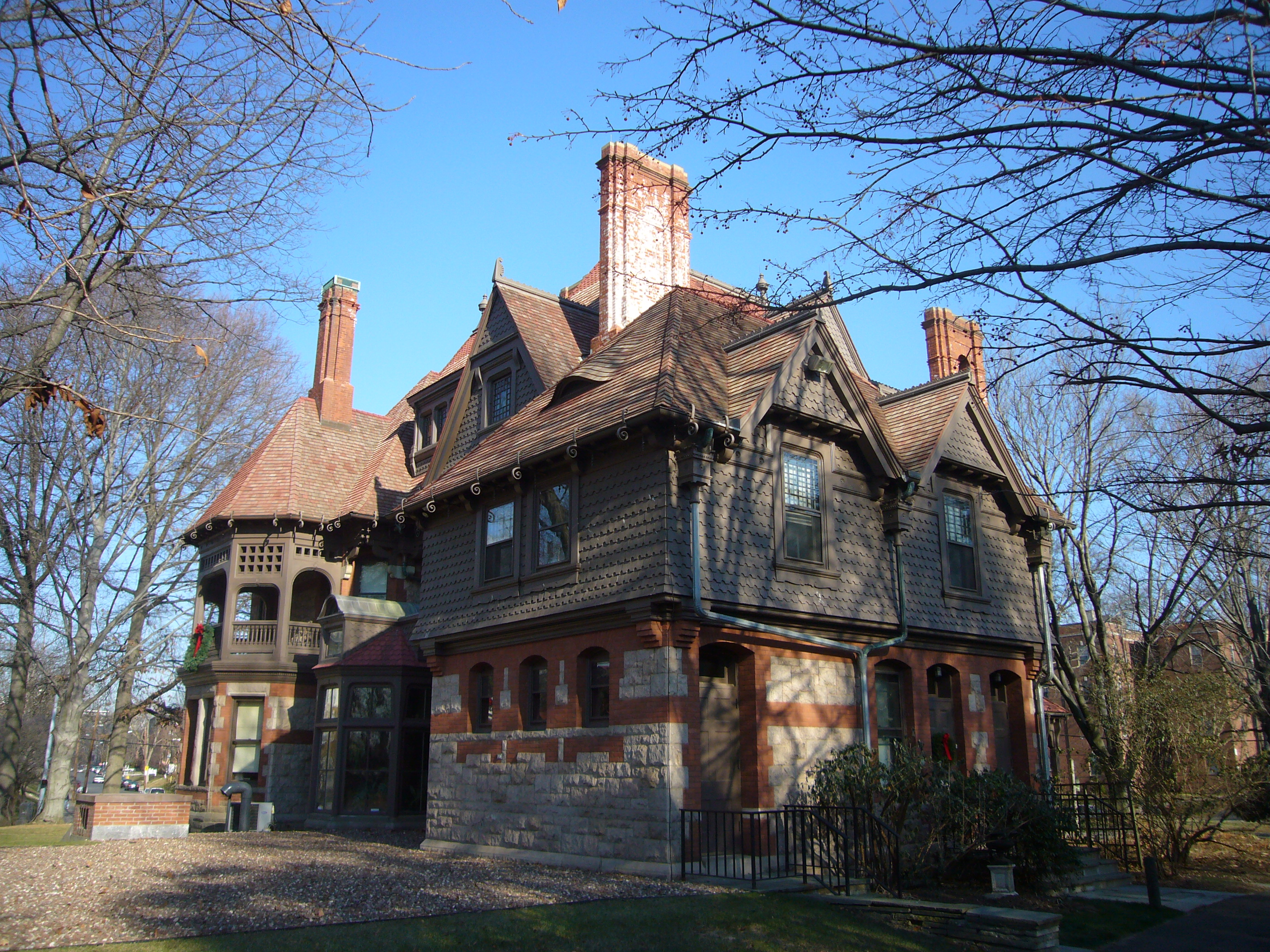
Katharine Seymour Day House on the grounds of the Harriet Beecher Stowe Center

After Harriet Beecher Stowe's death in 1896, the property was sold out of the family. It was reacquired by her grandniece, Katharine Seymour Day, in 1924. Day, who had known the family of Mark Twain as a girl, also acquired the neighboring Mark Twain House and saved it from development in 1929. Day bequeathed her Hartford properties to a foundation dedicated to Stowe's legacy. Now known as the Stowe Center for Literary Activism, officially founded in 1941, this organization carefully restored the property in 1965–68, and now operates it as a historic house museum. It was first opened to the public in 1968. The home was added to the National Register of Historic Places in 1970, and declared a National Historic Landmark in 2013. Today, guided tours are offered to the public, and the house includes original family furnishings and memorabilia. Annual visitation is over 25,000.

In addition to the Stowe House, the Center manages an 1873 carriage house, which now serves as the visitor center, and the Katharine Seymour Day House (1884). The Stowe Center preserves the house and center's collections, with a research library that includes letters and documents from the family. The collections include an estimated 6,000 objects and over 200,000 manuscripts, books, photographs, and other materials. The site is part of the Connecticut Women's Heritage Trail.

=== The Stowe Prize ===
Stowe Center for Literary Activism annually awards a prize to a U.S. author whose work is deemed to have affected a critical social issue in the tradition of Stowe’s Uncle Tom’s Cabin. Recipients include:

- Nicholas Kristof and Sheryl WuDunn (2011), for Half the Sky: Turning Oppression into Opportunity for Women Worldwide.
- Michelle Alexander (2013), for The New Jim Crow: Mass Incarceration in the Age of Colorblindness.
- Ta-Nehisi Coates (2015), for "The Case for Reparations".
- Bryan Stevenson (2017), for Just Mercy: A Story of Justice and Redemption
- Matthew Desmond (2018), for Evicted: Poverty and Profit in the American City
- Albert Woodfox (2020), for Solitary
- Clint Smith (2022) for How the Word Is Passed: A Reckoning with the History of Slavery Across America

== See also ==
- Harriet Beecher Stowe House (Cincinnati, Ohio)
- Harriet Beecher Stowe House (Brunswick, Maine)
- List of National Historic Landmarks in Connecticut
- List of residences of American writers
- National Register of Historic Places listings in Hartford, Connecticut
