= Nook Farm (Connecticut) =

- Nook Farm and Woodland Street District
- U.S. National Register of Historic Places
- U.S. Historic district
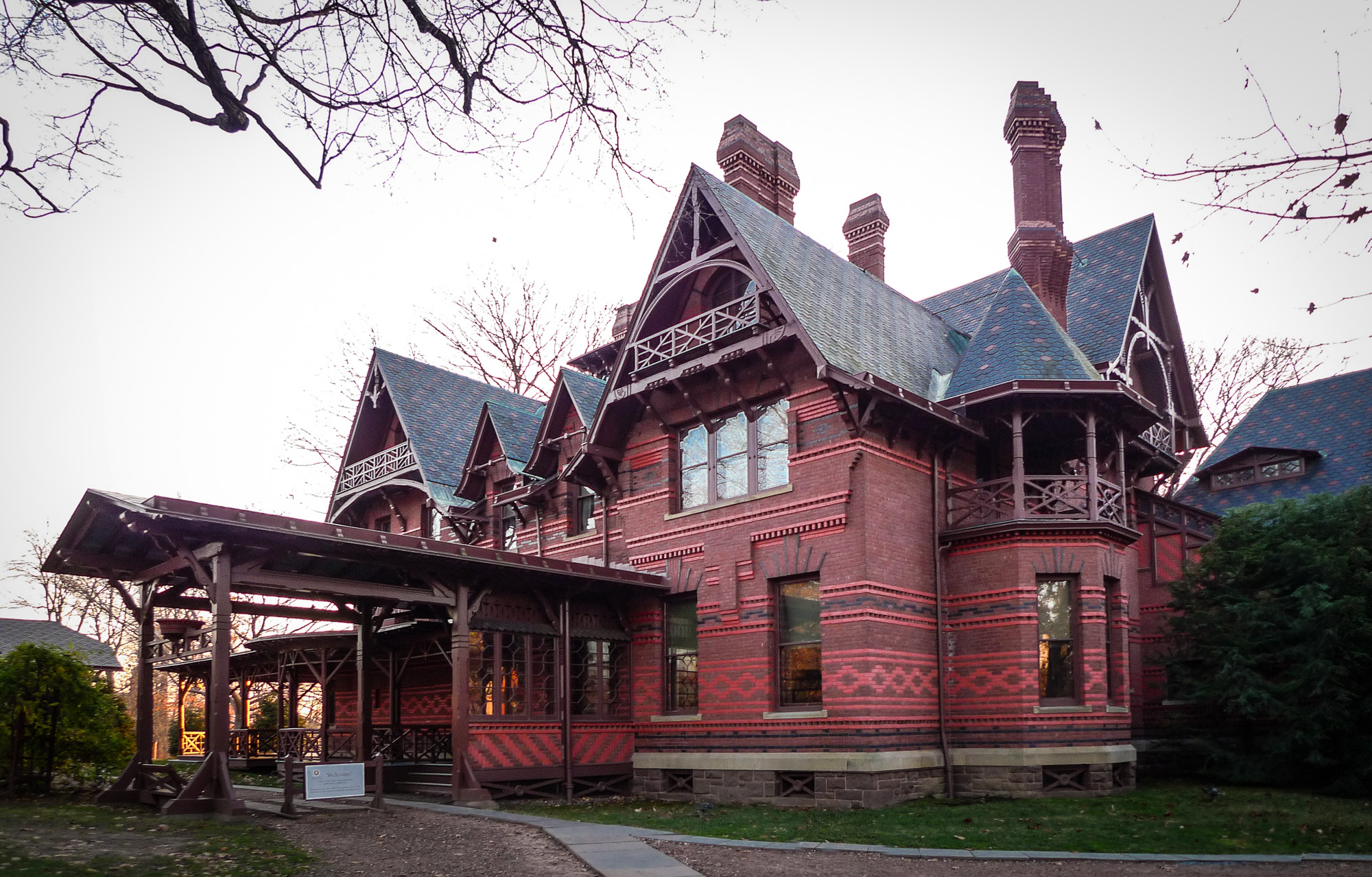
- The Mark Twain House

- Location within Connecticut Location within the United States
- Location: Woodland, Gillett, and Forest Streets, and Farmington Avenue, Hartford, Connecticut
- Area: 41 acres (17 ha)
- Architect: Brocklesby, William C.; Multiple
- Architectural style: Late 19th and 20th Century Revivals, Gothic, Queen Anne
- MPS: Asylum Hill MRA
- NRHP reference No.: 79002674
- Added to NRHP: November 29, 1979

Nook Farm is a historical neighborhood in the Asylum Hill section on the western edge of Hartford, Connecticut, USA.

== History ==
In the early 1800s, the area was dominated by the Imlay farm, which occupied most of the land from present-day Imlay Street West to the North Branch of the Park River, and from Farmington Avenue south to the Park River. John Hooker and his brother-in-law Francis Gillette purchased the pasture and woodland from William Imlay in 1853 for the purpose of developing the real estate. They built their own homes and sold parcels of land to relatives and friends to do likewise. As a result, an art colony took hold that included Hooker and his wife Isabella Beecher Hooker, the Gillettes, Charles Dudley Warner, Joseph Roswell Hawley, Harriet Beecher Stowe, Mark Twain, the Rev. Nathaniel Judson Burton and his wife Rachel Pine Chase Burton, as well as other journalists, feminists, spiritualists, painters, writers, reformers and activists. The area became known as Nook Farm, taking its name from the bend‚ or "nook‚" in the Park River‚ which bordered the area on the west and south.

Nook Farm "developed into a tight-knit community through a web of family and business connections. It was an oasis apart from the bustling city and a place that bubbled over with ideas about politics and reform during a time of great tumult in the nation." Mark Twain described the openness of the neighborhood, "Among the colonists of our neighborhood the doors always stood open in pleasant weather."

The homes were designed by leading architects of the day, including Edward Tuckerman Potter, Francis Hatch Kimball and Richard Upjohn. Although many of them were demolished over the years, including eleven to make room for the Hartford Public High School, some still survive. Currently, the Mark Twain House, the Harriet Beecher Stowe House, and the Katherine Day House are museums open to the public. The John and Isabella Hooker House is now an apartment building, as is the House at 36 Forest Street, built later in 1895.

== Historic district ==
A large portion of the Nook Farm area was listed on the National Register of Historic Places in 1979. The district is anchored at the center by the complex of museum properties that make up the Twain and Stowe houses. It extends south along Forest Street north along Woodland and Gillett Streets roughly to Niles Street. In addition to the surviving mansion houses, there are several architecturally stylish early 20th-century apartment blocks.

== Gallery ==
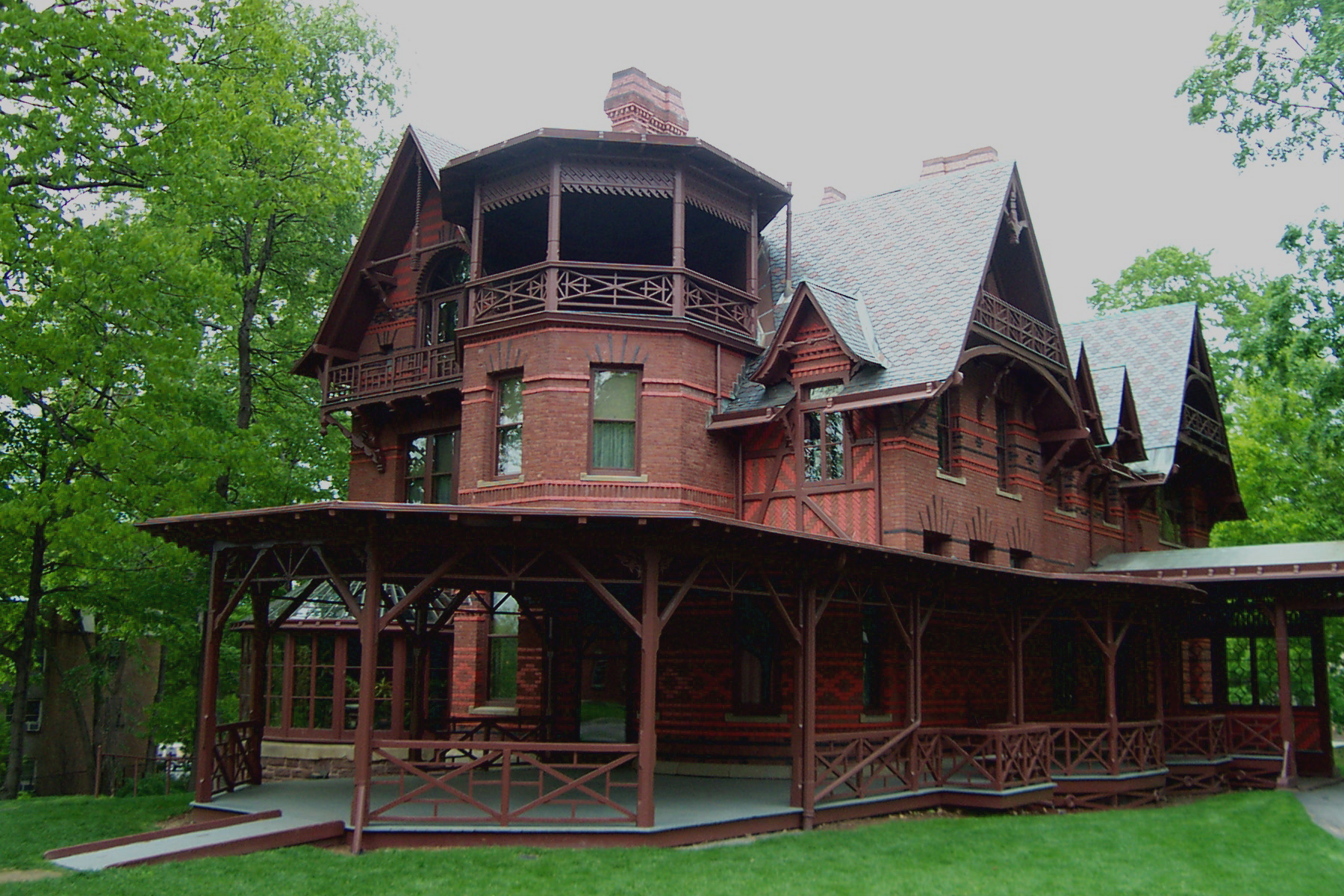
Mark Twain House from Southeast, 2004

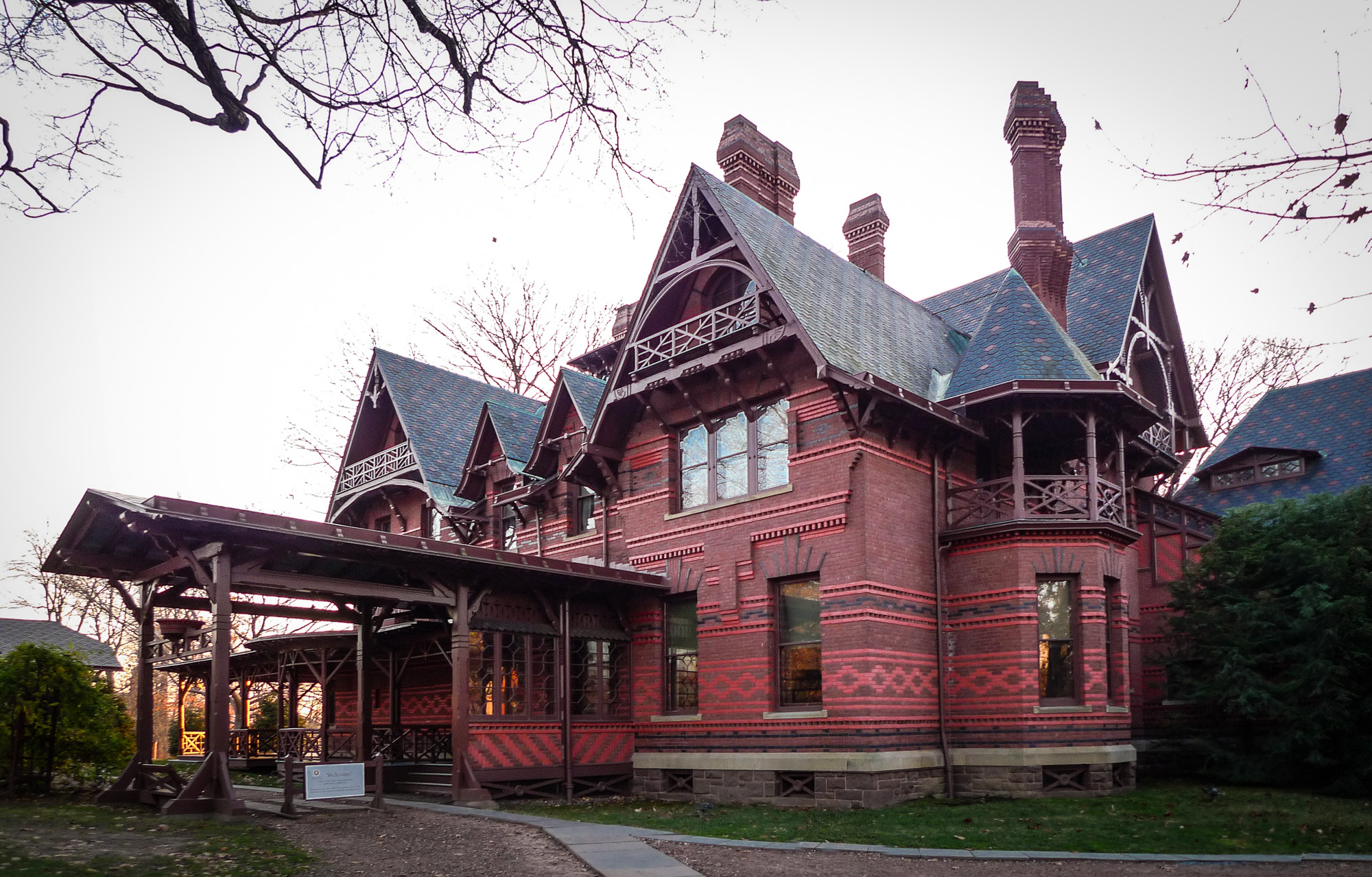
Mark Twain House from Northeast, 2009

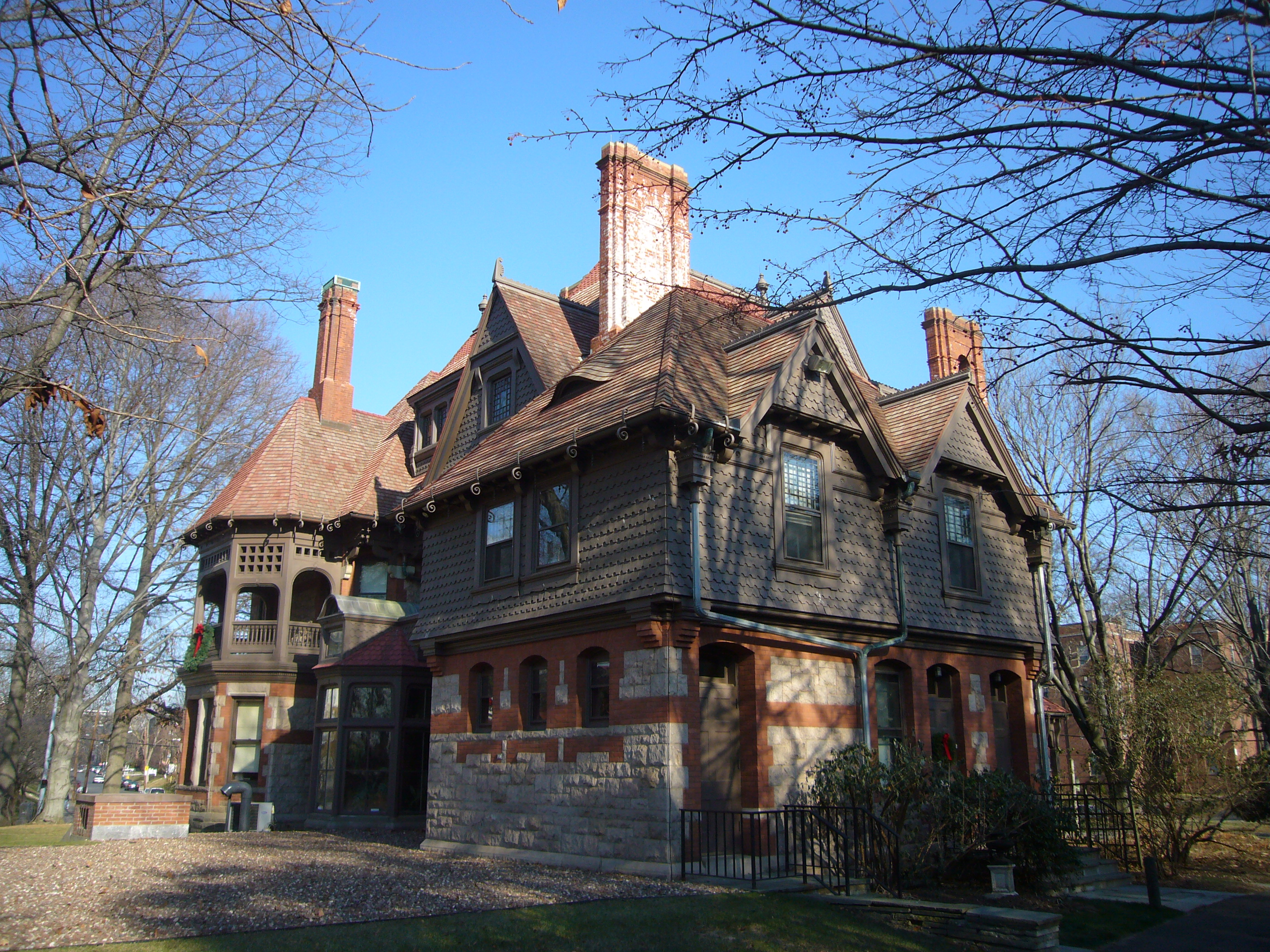
Katharine Seymour Day House

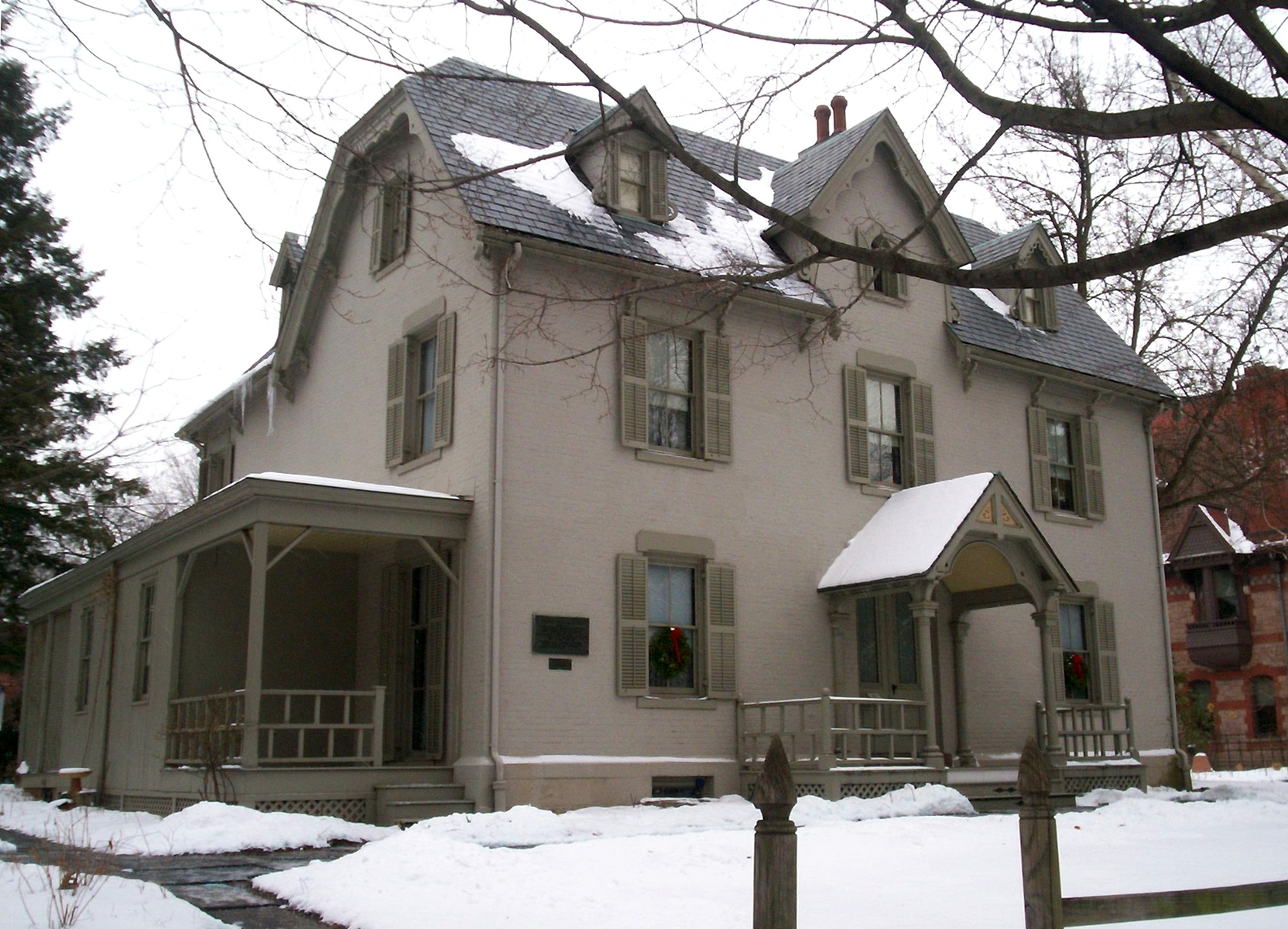
Harriet Beecher Stowe House

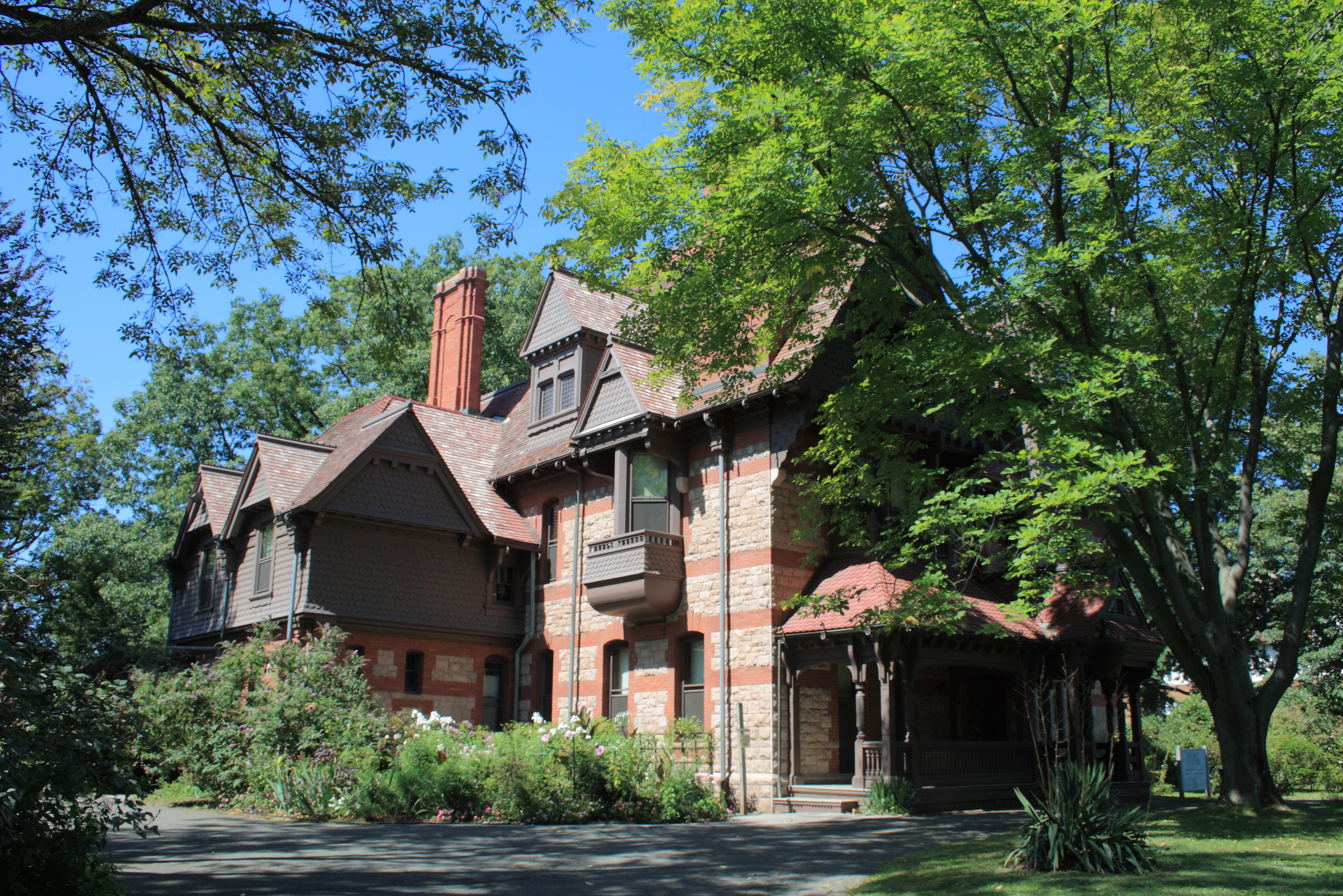
Katharine Seymour Day House

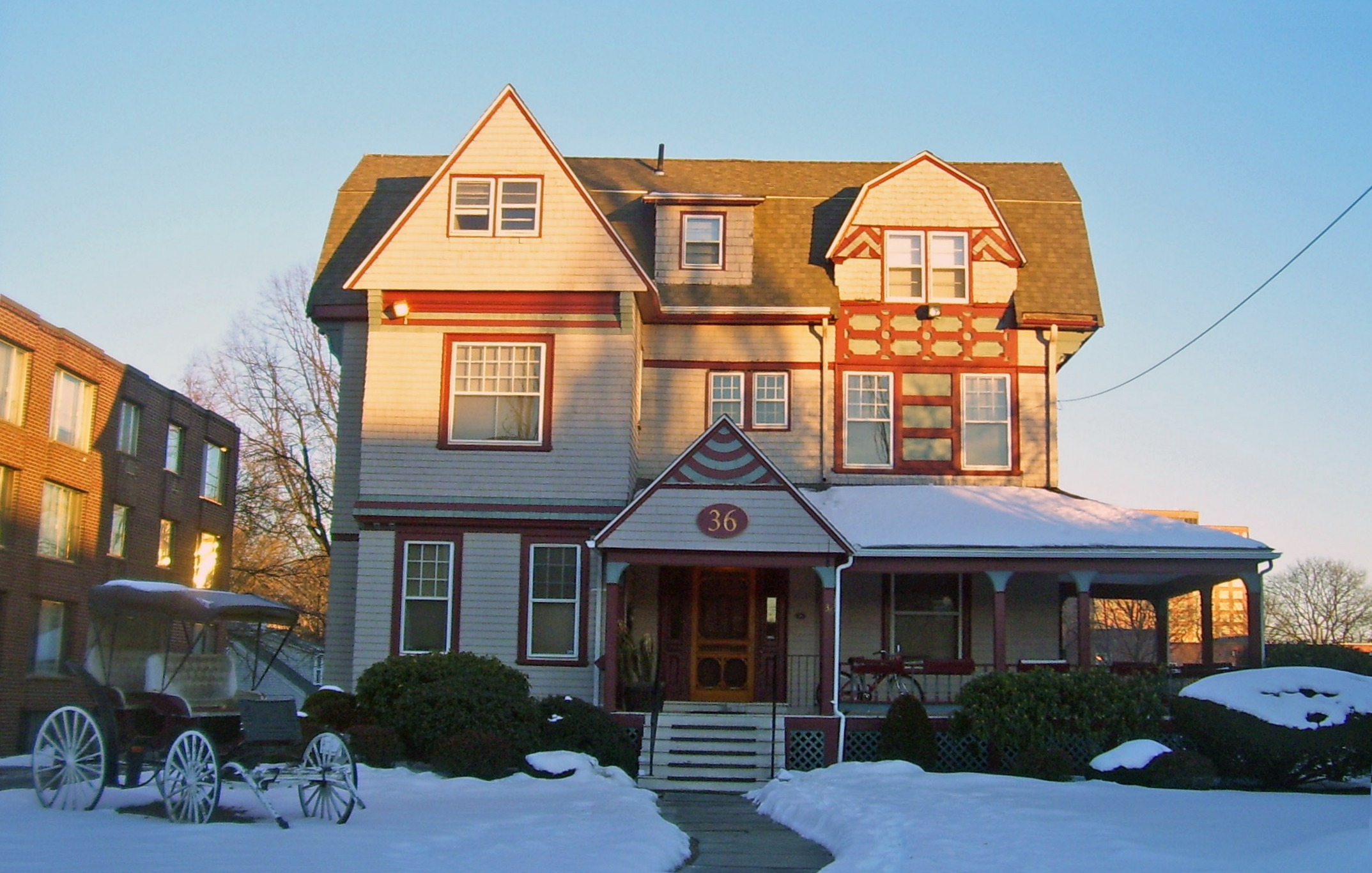
36 Forest Street

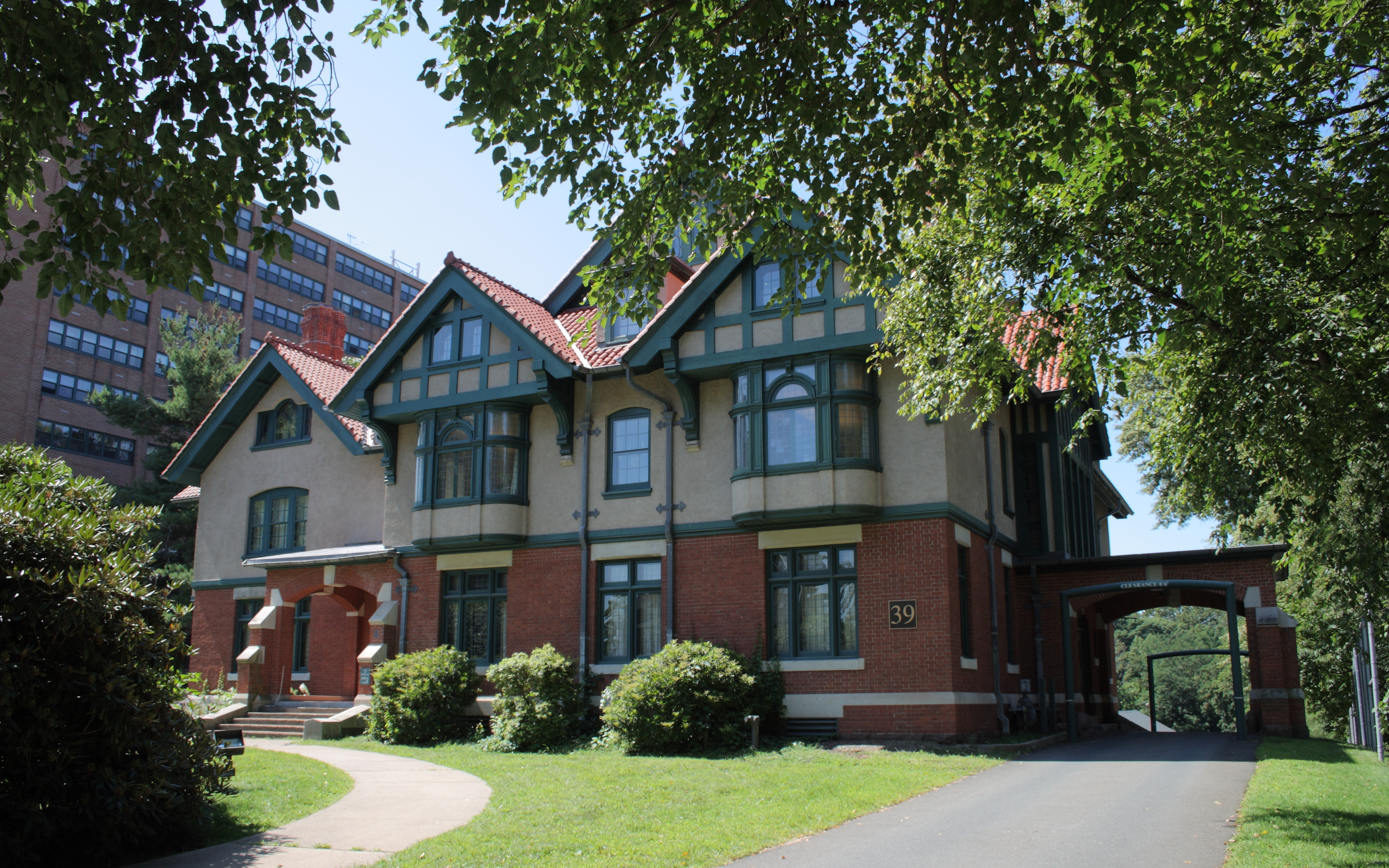
39 Woodland Street

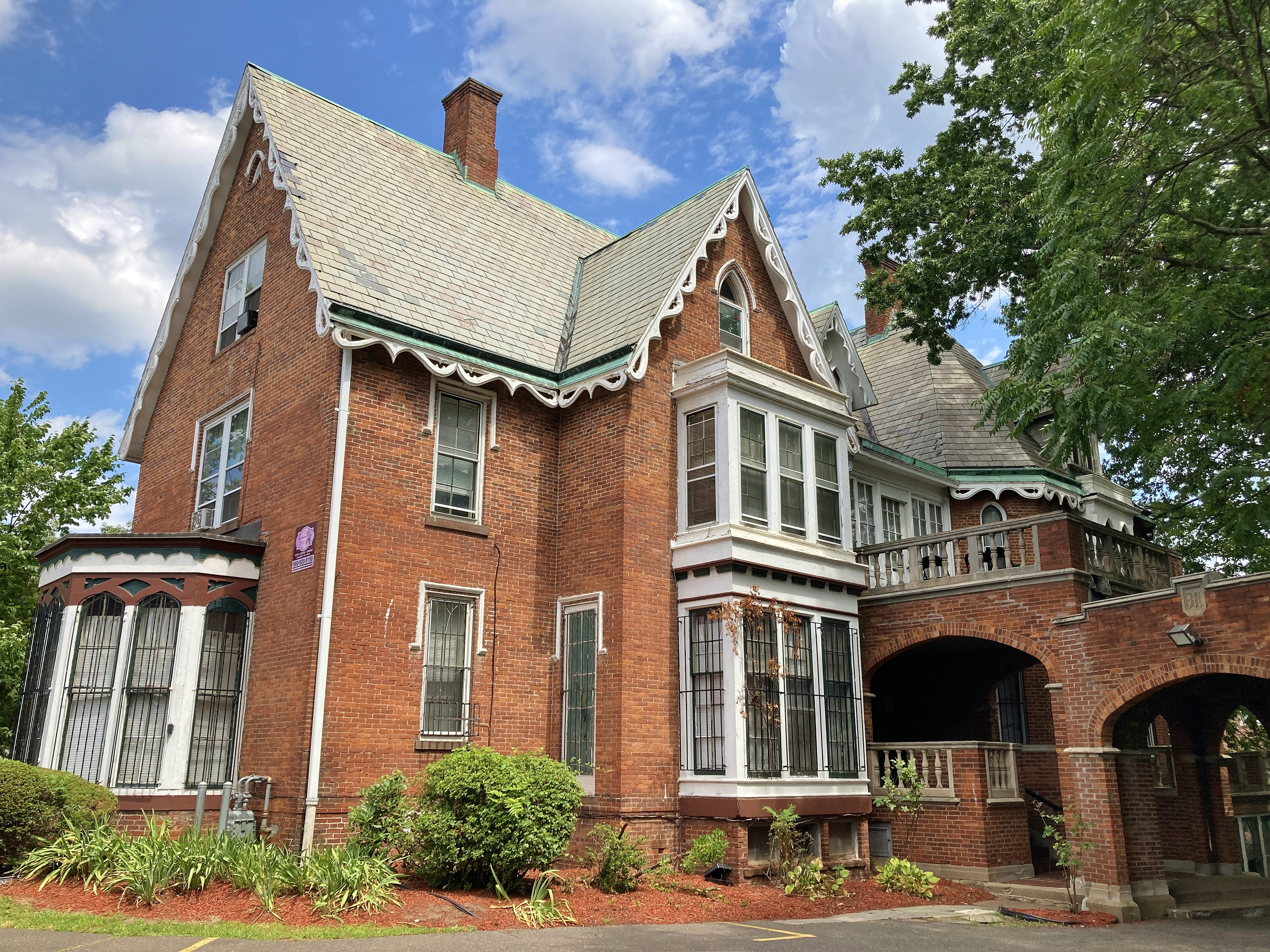
John and Isabella Hooker House

== See also ==
- National Register of Historic Places listings in Hartford, Connecticut
