= Beecher, Wisconsin =

Town of Beecher
- Town
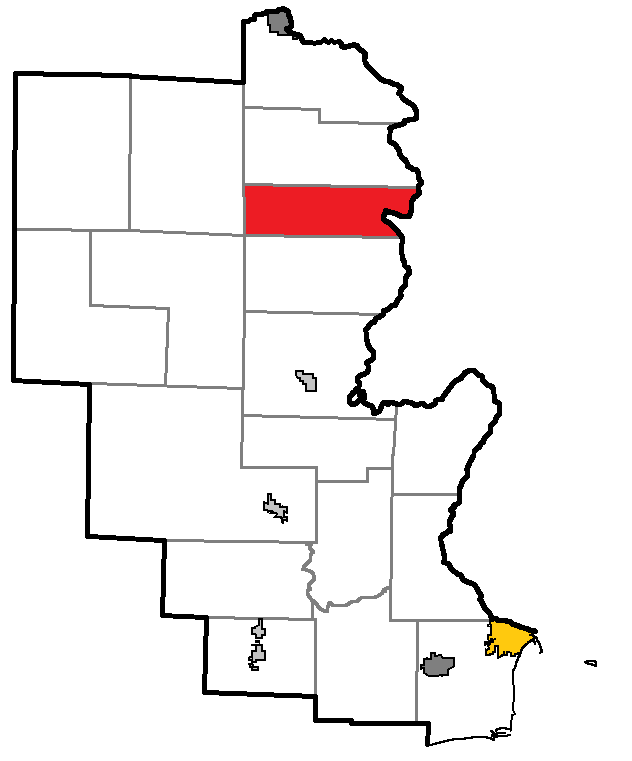
- Location of the Town of Beecher, within Marinette County
- Coordinates: 45°34′53″N 87°55′12″W
- Country: United States
- State: Wisconsin
- County: Marinette

Area
  - Total: 49.4 sq mi (127.9 km^{2})
  - Land: 48.5 sq mi (125.7 km^{2})
  - Water: 0.85 sq mi (2.2 km^{2})
- Elevation: 899 ft (274 m)

Population (2020)
  - Total: 786
  - Density: 16.2/sq mi (6.25/km^{2})
- Time zone: UTC-6 (Central (CST))
  - Summer (DST): UTC-5 (CDT)
- Postal code: 54156
- Area code: 715
- FIPS code: 55-06000
- GNIS feature ID: 1582779
- Website: https://www.townofbeecher.com/

The Town of Beecher is located in Marinette County, Wisconsin, United States. The population was 786 at the 2020 census.

== Communities ==
- Beecher is an unincorporated community at the intersection of US Highway 141 and County Road Z.
- Beecher Lake is an unincorporated community at the intersection of US 141 and County Road L on the Escanaba and Lake Superior Railroad, one mile south of Beecher.
- White Pine Haven is a small community located on the southern end of Butterfield Lane, south of County Road Z just north of a bend on the Menominee River, where it is north of a portion of the Upper Peninsula.

== Geography ==
According to the United States Census Bureau, the town has a total area of 49.4 square miles (127.9 km^{2}), of which 48.5 square miles (125.7 km^{2}) is land and 0.9 square mile (2.2 km^{2}) (1.74%) is water.

== Demographics ==
The most recent data indicates that there are 826 people, 334 households, and 227 families residing in the town of Beecher. The population density was 16.1 inhabitants per square mile (6.2/km^{2}). There were 971 housing units at an average density of 20.0 per square mile (7.7/km^{2}). The racial makeup of the town was 94.25% White, 1.15% African American, 1.92% Native American, 0.26% Asian, 0.89% from other races, and 1.53% from two or more races. Hispanic or Latino of any race were 2.17% of the population.

There were 334 households, out of which 22.8% had children under the age of 18 living with them, 59.9% were married couples living together, 5.1% had a female householder with no husband present, and 32.0% were non-families. 26.3% of all households were made up of individuals, and 11.1% had someone living alone who was 65 years of age or older. The average household size was 2.34 and the average family size was 2.81.

In the town, the population was spread out, with 23.5% under the age of 18, 5.1% from 18 to 24, 25.5% from 25 to 44, 29.1% from 45 to 64, and 16.7% who were 65 years of age or older. The median age was 42 years. For every 100 females, there were 98.2 males. For every 100 females age 18 and over, there were 103.7 males.

The median income for a household in the town was $29,107, and the median income for a family was $31,397. Males had a median income of $33,000 versus $19,875 for females. The per capita income for the town was $17,674. About 11.3% of families and 11.9% of the population were below the poverty line, including 16.4% of those under age 18 and 17.4% of those age 65 or over.

== Government ==
Beecher is governed by a town board composed of three representatives, a chairman and two supervisors, all elected at large. Town meetings are held the second Tuesday of each month at the town hall.

== Education ==
Students in Beecher are served by the Pembine-Beecher-Dunbar public school district.

== Churches ==
There is one church in the town of Beecher located on US Highway 141: Crossroads Church (an Assembly of God congregation), Faith Baptist Church, formerly located in Beecher, currently meets at the Amberg town hall.
