= Mark Twain House =

Historic house in Connecticut, United States

- U.S. National Register of Historic Places
- U.S. National Historic Landmark
- U.S. Historic district – Contributing property
- Interactive map showing the location of Mark Twain House
- Location: 351 Farmington Avenue, Hartford, Connecticut
- Coordinates: 41°46′1.5″N 72°42′5.0″W
- Built: 1874
- Architect: Edward Tuckerman Potter
- Architectural style: Victorian Gothic
- Website: www.marktwainhouse.org
- Part of: Nook Farm and Woodland Street District (ID79002674)
- NRHP reference No.: 66000884

Significant dates
- Added to NRHP: October 15, 1966
- Designated NHL: December 29, 1962
- Designated CP: November 29, 1979

The Mark Twain House and Museum in Hartford, Connecticut, was the home of Samuel Langhorne Clemens (Mark Twain) and his family from 1874 to 1891. The Clemens family had it designed by Edward Tuckerman Potter and built in the America High Gothic style. Clemens biographer Justin Kaplan has called it "part steamboat, part medieval fortress and part cuckoo clock."

Clemens wrote many of his best-known works while living there, including The Adventures of Tom Sawyer, The Prince and the Pauper, Life on the Mississippi, Adventures of Huckleberry Finn, A Tramp Abroad, and A Connecticut Yankee in King Arthur's Court.

Poor financial investments prompted the Clemens family to move to Europe in 1891. The Panic of 1893 further threatened their financial stability, and Clemens, his wife Olivia, and their middle daughter, Clara, spent the year 1895–96 traveling so that he could lecture and earn the money to pay off their debts. He recounted the trip in Following the Equator (1897). Their other two daughters, Susy and Jean, had stayed behind during this time, and Susy died at home on August 18, 1896, of spinal meningitis before the family could be reunited. They could not bring themselves to reside in the house after this tragedy and spent most of their remaining years living abroad. They sold the house in 1903.

The building later functioned as a school, an apartment building, and a public library branch. In 1929, it was rescued from possible demolition and put under the care of the newly formed non-profit group Mark Twain Memorial. The building was declared a National Historic Landmark in 1962. A restoration effort led to its being opened as a house museum in 1974. In 2003, a multimillion-dollar, LEED-certified visitors' center was built that included a museum dedicated to showcasing Twain's life and work.

The house faced serious financial trouble in 2008 due partly to construction cost overruns related to the new visitors' center, but the museum was helped through publicity about their plight, quick reaction from the state of Connecticut, corporations, and other donors, and a benefit performance organized by writers. Since that time, the museum has reported improved financial conditions, though the recovery was marred by the 2010 discovery of a million-dollar embezzlement by the museum's comptroller, who pleaded guilty and served a jail term.

The museum claimed record-setting attendance levels in 2012. It has featured events such as celebrity appearances by Stephen King, Judy Blume, John Grisham, and others; it has also sponsored writing programs and awards. Also in 2012, the Mark Twain House was named one of the Ten Best Historic Homes in the world in The Ten Best of Everything, a National Geographic Books publication.

== Move to Hartford ==
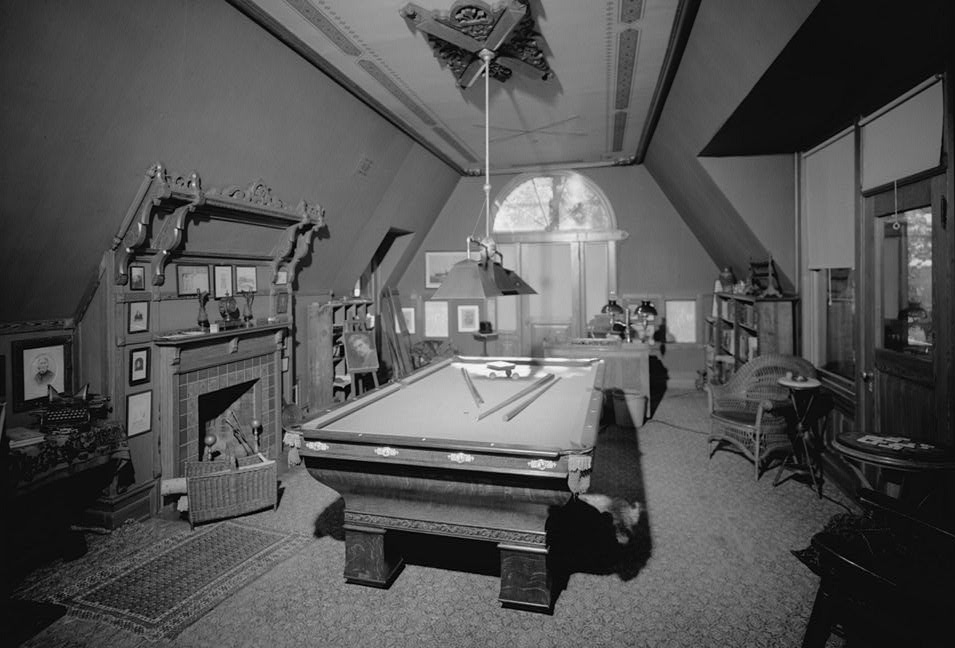
The Billiards Room where Twain wrote

Mark Twain first came to Hartford in 1868 while writing The Innocents Abroad in order to work with publisher Elisha Bliss Jr. of the American Publishing Company. Hartford was a publishing center at the time, with twelve publishers. He moved into a substantial home in Buffalo, New York after marrying Olivia Langdon; however, he considered moving to a more opulent house in Hartford within two years, partly to be closer to his publisher.

The family first rented a house at what was called Nook Farm in 1871 before buying land there and building a new house. Twain said of Hartford, "Of all the beautiful towns it has been my fortune to see, this is the chief…. You do not know what beauty is if you have not been here."

== Architecture and construction ==
The house was designed by Edward Tuckerman Potter, an architect from New York City. When it was being built, the Hartford Daily Times noted, "The novelty displayed in the architecture of the building, the oddity of its internal arrangement and the fame of its owner will all conspire to make it a house of note for a long time to come." The cost of the house was paid out of Mrs. Clemens' inheritance.

The home is in the style of Victorian Gothic Revival architecture, including the typical steeply pitched roof and an asymmetrical bay window layout. Legend says the home was designed to look like a riverboat. According to A Field Guide to American Houses the house was built in the Stick style of Victorian architecture.

In 1881, an adjoining strip of land was purchased, the grounds re-landscaped, and the home was renovated. The driveway was redrawn, the kitchen rebuilt and its size doubled, and the front hall was enlarged. The family also installed new plumbing and heating and a burglar alarm. After its renovations, the total cost of the home amounted to $70,000, $22,000 were spent on furnishings, and the initial purchase of land cost $31,000.

== Life in the house ==
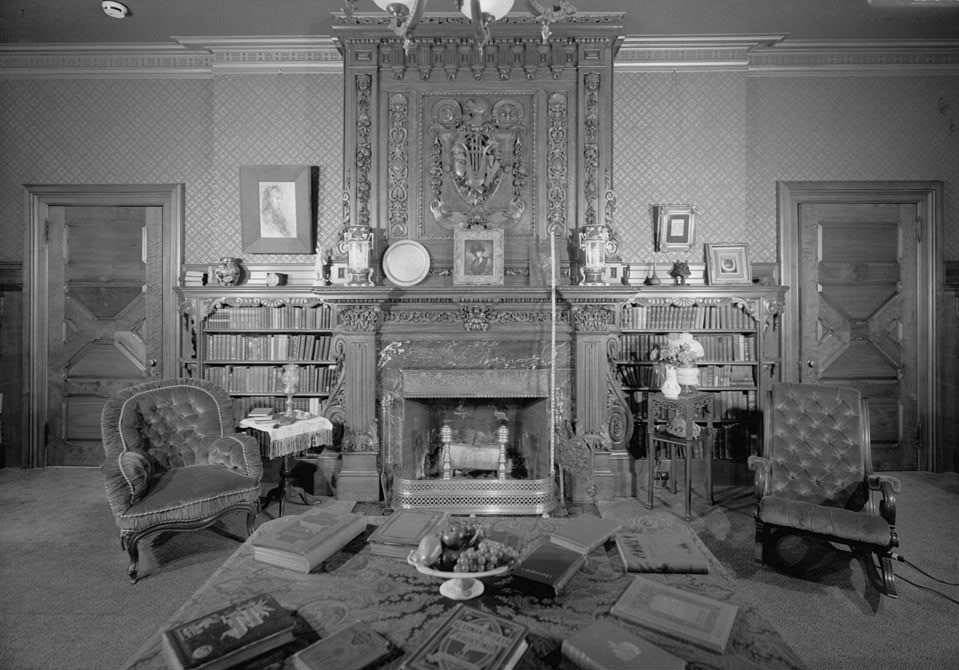
The library features hand-stenciled paneling, fireplaces from India, embossed wallpapers, and an enormous handcarved mantel that the Twains purchased in Scotland

The Clemens family moved into the home in 1874 after its completion. The top floor was the billiards room and his private study where he would write late at night; the room was strictly off limits to all but the cleaning staff. It was also used for entertaining male guests with cigars and liquor. Twain had said, "There ought to be a room in this house to swear in. It's dangerous to have to repress an emotion like that."

The children had their own area with a nursery and a playroom/classroom. Mrs. Clemens tutored her daughters in the large school room on the second floor. Clemens played with his children in the conservatory, pretending to be an elephant in an imaginary safari. He noted that the house "was of us, and we were in its confidence and lived in its grace and in the peace of its benediction."

Clemens enjoyed living in the house, partly because he knew many different authors from his Hartford neighborhood, such as Harriet Beecher Stowe who lived next door and Isabella Beecher Hooker. He also hosted several authors as guests, including Thomas Bailey Aldrich, George Washington Cable, and William Dean Howells, as well as actors Henry Irving, Lawrence Barrett, and Edwin Booth.

Clemens worked on many of his most notable books in this home, including The Adventures of Tom Sawyer (1876) and Life on the Mississippi (1883). The success of The Adventures of Tom Sawyer inspired him to renovate the house, and he had Louis Comfort Tiffany supervise the interior decoration in 1881. He also was fascinated with new technologies, leading to the installation of an early telephone.

Clemens invested heavily in the typesetting machine invented by James W. Paige. He also formed the firm Charles L. Webster & Company, which published Twain's own writings, and issued a bestseller with Ulysses S. Grant's memoirs. Its first publication was Adventures of Huckleberry Finn in 1884. The company went bankrupt in 1894, leaving Twain with a large amount of debt; Paige's typesetting machine never functioned properly and was overcome by competition from Ottmar Mergenthaler's linotype machine backed by Whitelaw Reid. The losses from these investments as well as several bank panics led the Clemens family to move to Europe in 1891 where the cost of living was more affordable. He began lecturing across the continent to recoup some money for their family. Unable to afford living in the house, Twain rented it out, returning only once in 1895. ‘’As soon as I entered this front door I was seized with a furious desire to have us all in this house again & right away,’’ he wrote, ‘’& never go outside the grounds any more forever. . . It is the loveliest home that ever was.”

== Post-Twain ==
Katharine Seymour Day was a grand-niece of Harriet Beecher Stowe who had known the Clemens family, and she saved the Twain House from destruction in 1929. She founded the Friends of Hartford organization, which raised $100,000 to secure a mortgage on the home through a two-year capital campaign. It was carefully restored between 1955 and 1974. It took many decades to pay off the mortgage and raise money to restore the deteriorating property, as well as to retrieve artifacts, furnishings, and personal possessions. The entire process finally ended in 1974, just in time for the 100th anniversary of the house. It also earned the David E. Finley Award in 1977 for "exemplary restoration" from the National Trust for Historic Preservation. Admission to the Mark Twain House is by guided tour only; tours are organized around various themes. The House and Museum offer a wide variety of events, in addition to tours, such as lectures, writers' workshops, and family events.

=== Renovation ===
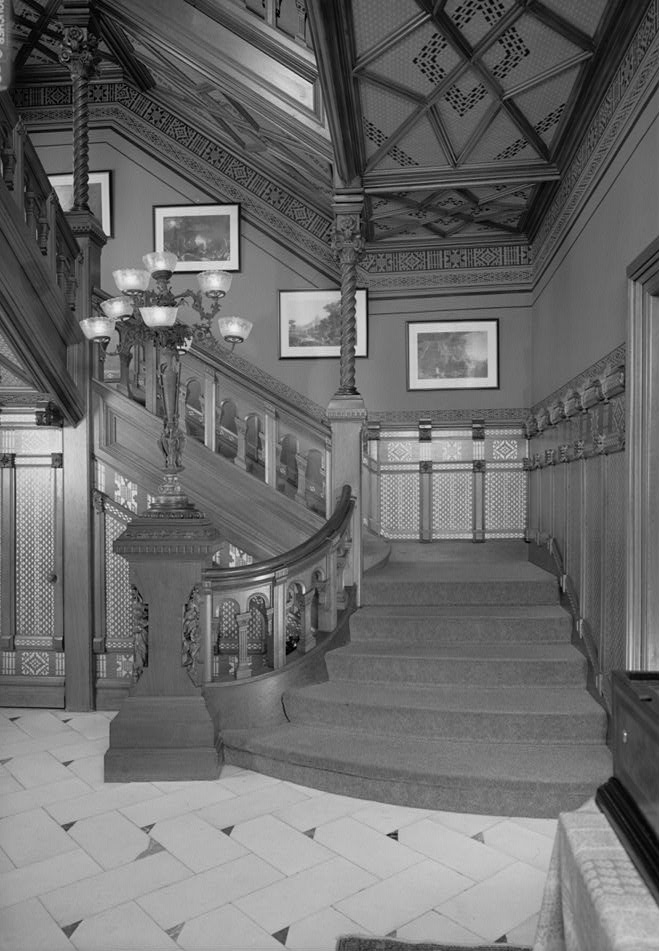
Entrance hall and main staircase

The house underwent a major renovation starting in 1999, including work on the exterior wood, tile, and terra cotta brick, and rebuilding the purple slate roofs. Restoration and preservation brought the house and grounds back to the state that they were in between 1881 and 1891, when the Clemenses most loved the house. The marble floor in the front hallway underwent a historic restoration, and specialists re-stenciled and painted the walls and ceilings and refinished the woodwork to recover the Tiffany-decorated interiors. Restoration was funded in part by two federal Save America’s Treasures grants totaling $3 million. Scanning computers were also used in the restoration. In 2016, the Mahogany Suite underwent a complete restoration effort that included the restoration of the architectural woodwork and plaster, and the reinstatement of the historic wallcoverings. The home today contains 50,000 artifacts: manuscripts, historic photographs, family furnishings, and Tiffany glass. Many of the original furnishings remain at the house, including the Clemens' ornate Venetian bed, an intricately carved mantel from a Scottish Castle and a billiard table.

=== Financial problems ===
The number of admissions leveled off at around 53,000, and the house's trustees decided that they must expand or be forced to shrink their operations. They commissioned Robert A. M. Stern to design a visitor center that would not draw attention away from the house. The Education and Visitors Center was built adjacent to the Carriage House where the Clemens family's coachman once lived with his family. The green museum was the first in America to receive a Leadership in Energy and Environmental Design (LEED) certification. The center is a $16.3 million, 35,000-square-foot (3,300 m^{2}) facility that houses artifacts from the museum's collection that are not shown in the house itself. It contains a lecture hall and classroom facilities. The house received $1 million from the state government to meet expenses related to the construction of the museum and restoration of the house. Since the museum opened in November 2003, attendance has increased by 15%.

In 2000, the house was generating $5 million in tourism from 50,000 visitors. The Aetna foundation gave $500,000 to the campaign. The National Endowment for the Humanities gave $800,000 in challenge grants for teacher development programs, a student writing contest, and an educational website.

After building the Visitors Center in 2003, the house became financially unsustainable and launched a campaign to raise awareness and funds. In response, the state government, the governor, United Technologies, and many others contributed. As of 2011, officials of the museum said that it had recovered financially.

In 2011, staff writer Steve Courtney published a book detailing the house's history and renovations. It includes a foreword by Hal Holbrook, a trustee of the house.

== Gallery ==
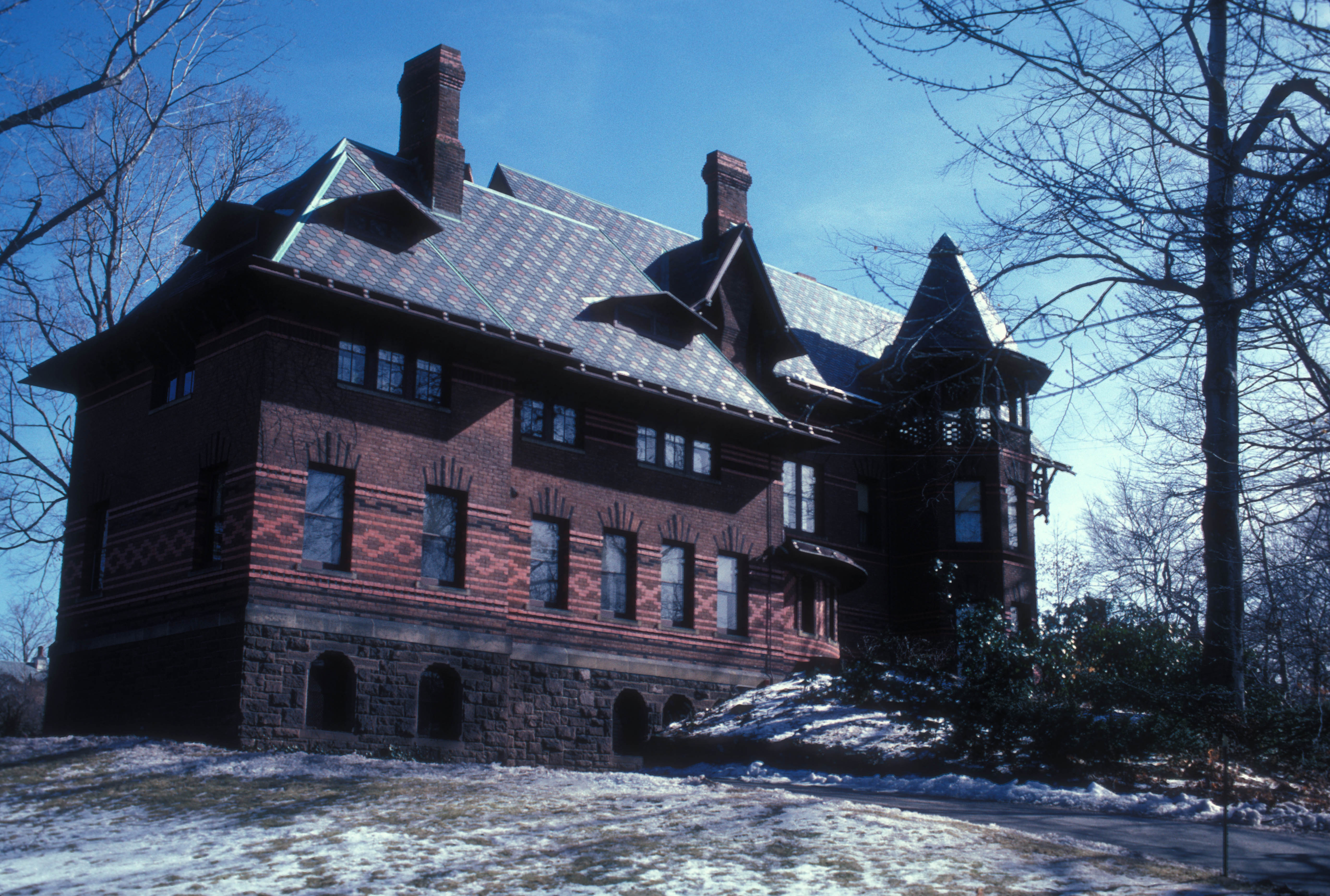
From the west, 1970

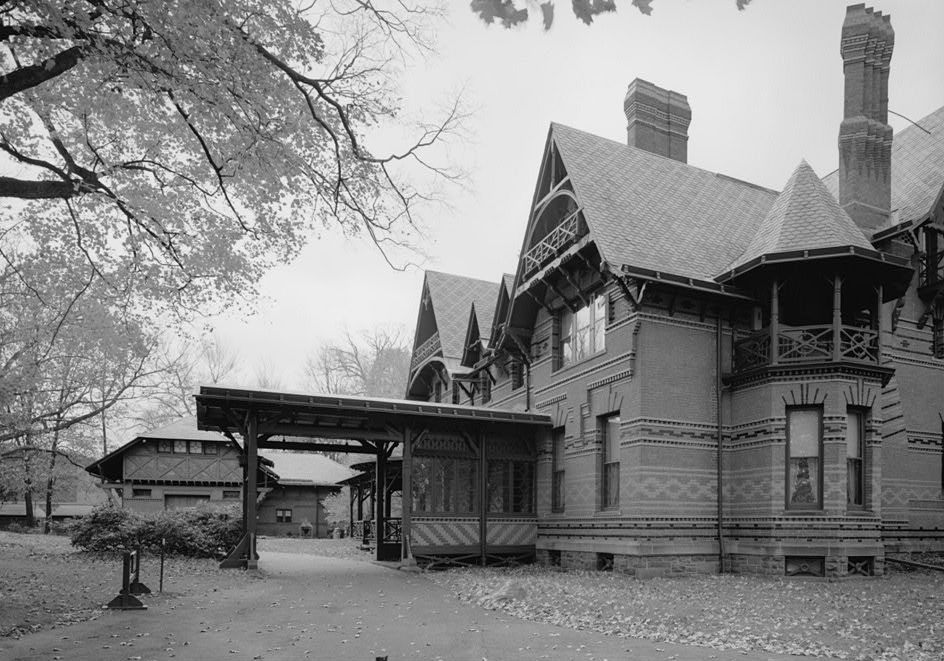
From the northeast, with the Mark Twain carriage house in the background, 1995

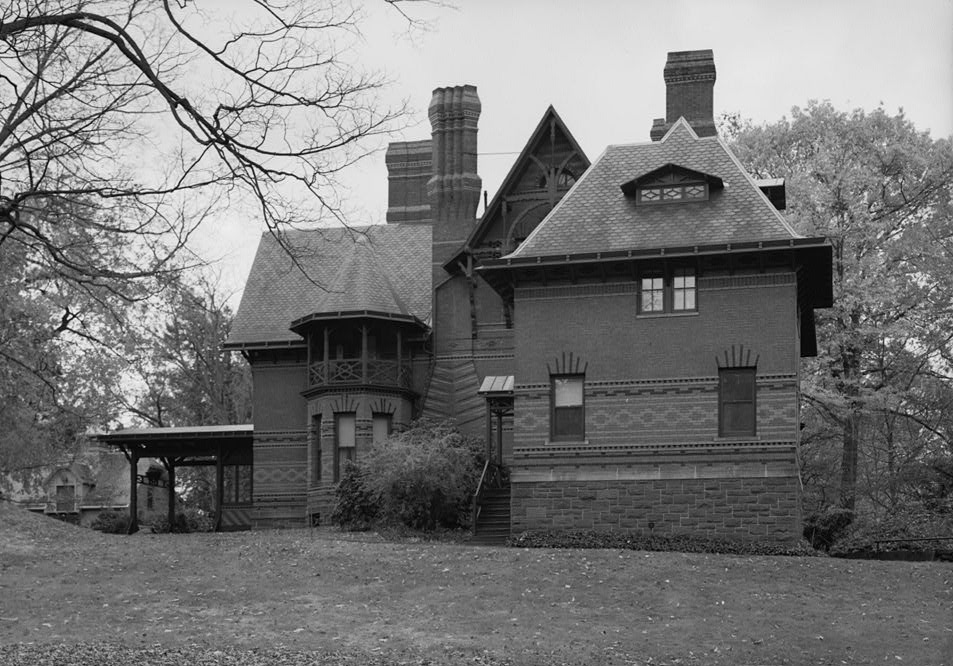
From the north, 1995

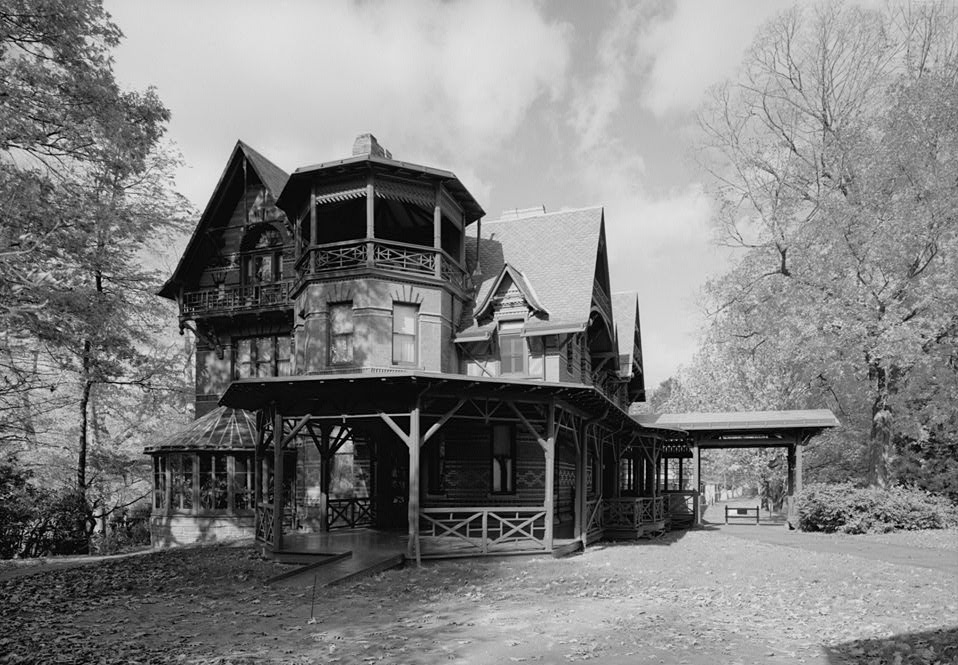
From the south, 1995

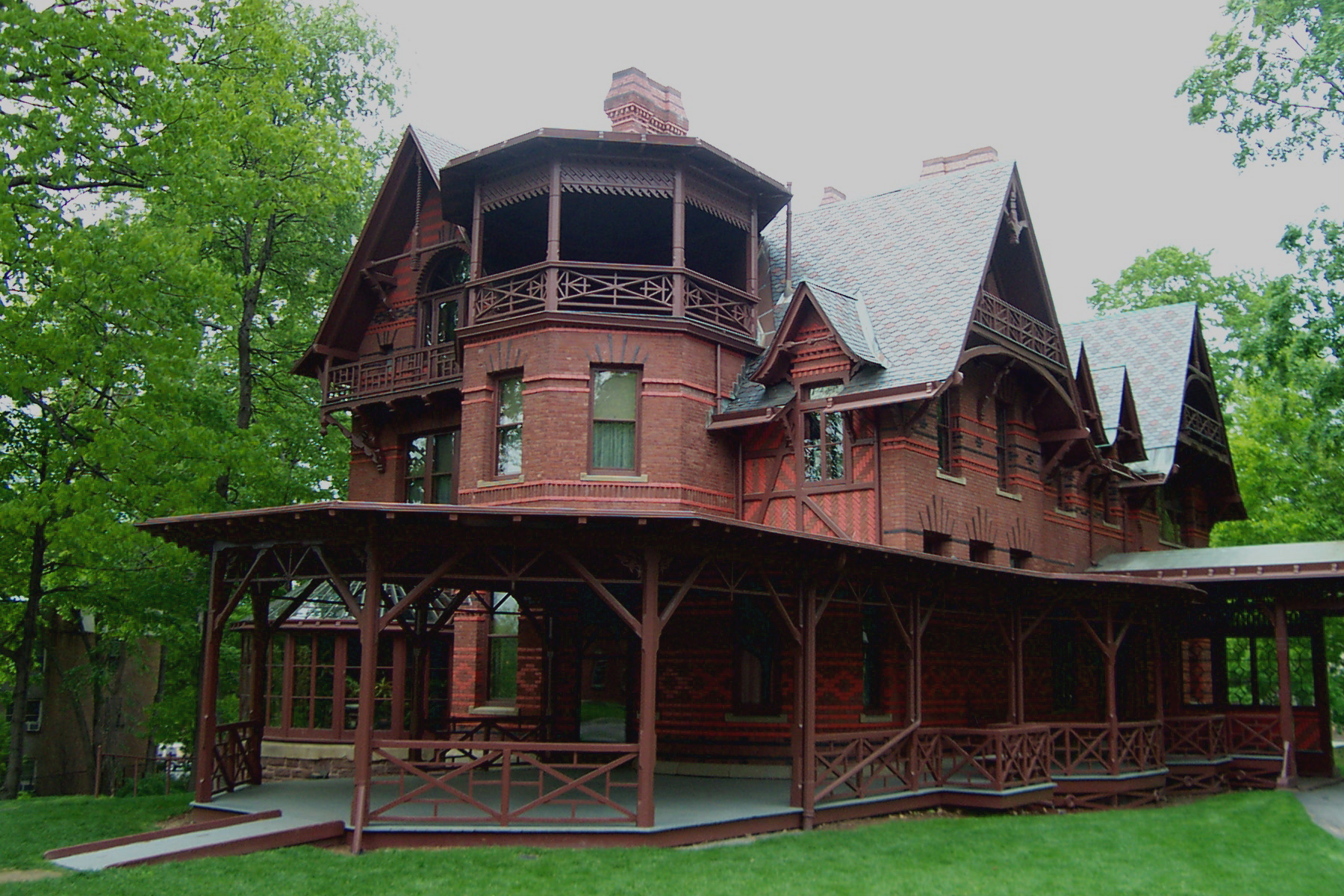
From the southeast, 2004

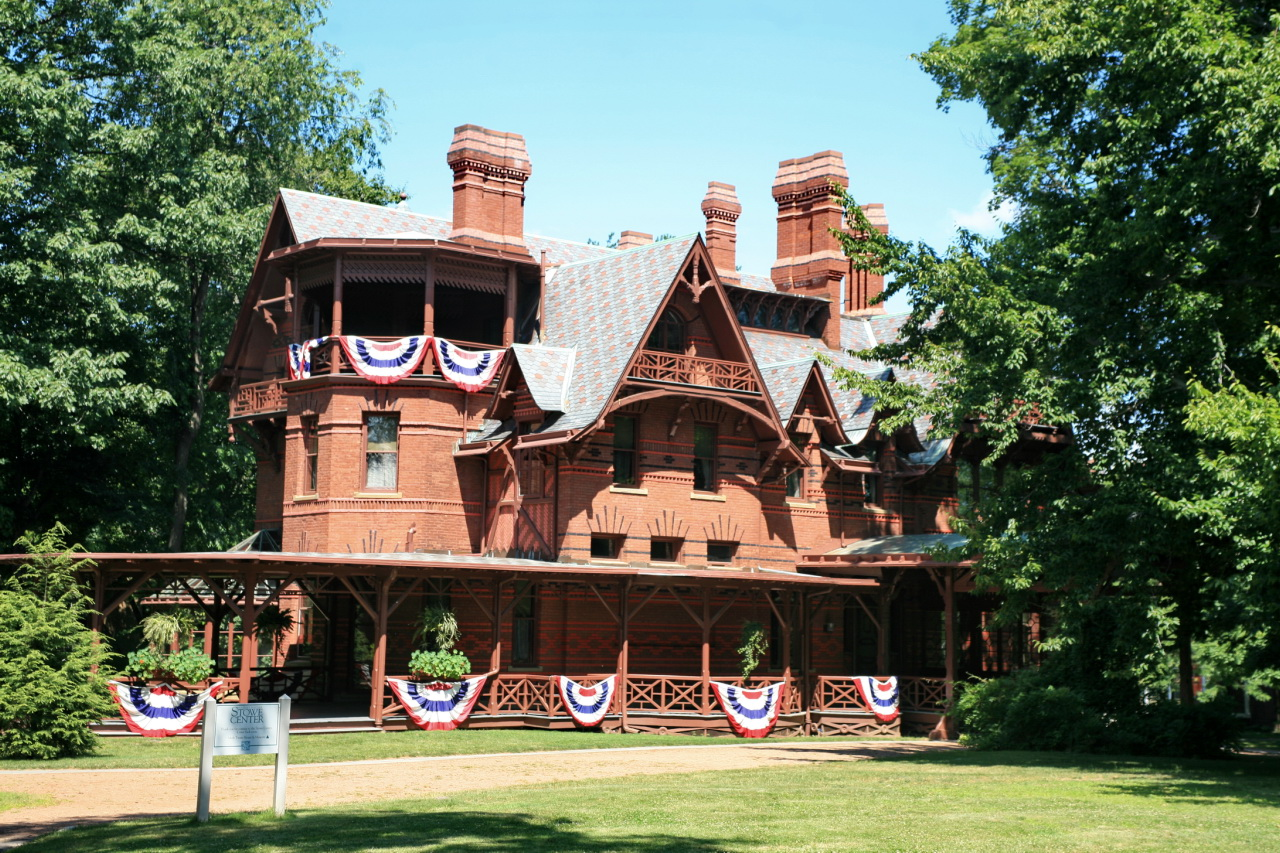
From the east, 2007

== See also ==
- Stormfield
- List of National Historic Landmarks in Connecticut
- List of residences of American writers
- National Register of Historic Places listings in Hartford, Connecticut
- North American Reciprocal Museums
