= Isabella Beecher Hooker =

American suffragist leader (1822–1907)

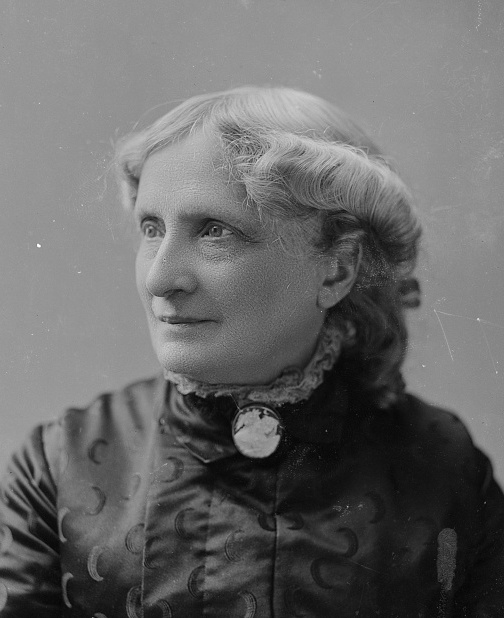
- Hooker's portrait by C. M. Bell Studio
- Born: Isabella Holmes Beecher; February 22, 1822; Litchfield, Connecticut
- Died: January 25, 1907 (aged 84); Hartford, Connecticut
- Occupation: Suffragist
- Spouse: John Hooker
- Children: Thomas Beecher Hooker; Mary Beecher Hooker; Alice Beecher Hooker; Edward Beecher Hooker
- Parent(s): Lyman Beecher and Harriet Porter

Isabella Beecher Hooker (February 22, 1822 – January 25, 1907) was an American lecturer and social activist in the American abolitionist and suffragist movements.

== Early life ==
Isabella Holmes Beecher was born in Litchfield, Connecticut, the fifth child and second daughter of Harriet Porter and the Reverend Lyman Beecher. As her father was called to new congregations, the family went to Boston, and then Cincinnati. In Cincinnati she attended her half-sister Catharine's Western Female Institute. The Western Female Institute closed during the Panic of 1837, not long after Isabella's mother Harriet died. Then, at age fifteen, she returned to Connecticut for an additional year of schooling at the Hartford Female Seminary, the first school her sister Catherine had founded, but was no longer involved with.

While studying in Hartford, Isabella met John Hooker, a young lawyer from an established Connecticut family. They married in 1841, and Isabella spent most of the following twenty-five years raising their three children. John brought a reformist attitude to the marriage; just before their marriage, John made his abolitionist sympathies known. Isabella did not immediately approve of her husband's position, but she gradually converted to the anti-slavery cause. Throughout the 1850s Isabella supported the abolitionist cause, but her primary activity was motherhood. These early tendencies toward domesticity were likely an influence of her sister Catherine's philosophy. The Hooker family moved to Hartford in 1853 and purchased land with Francis and Elisabeth Gillette, which formed the first homesteads of what would become the Nook Farm Literary Colony.

== Activism ==
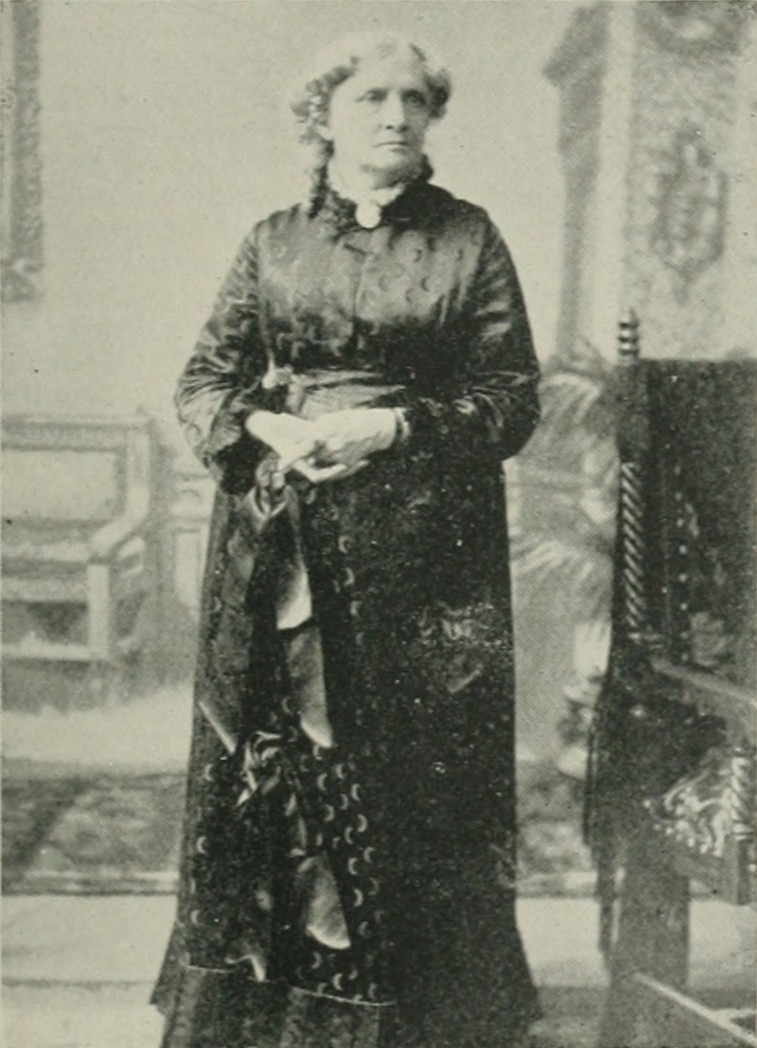
Isabella Beecher Hooker, undated

Following the Civil War, Isabella carefully ventured into the divided women's movement with the unsigned "A Mother's Letter to a Daughter on Women Suffrage," which relied on the idea that "women would raise the moral level of politics and bring a motherly wisdom to the affairs of government." Isabella first attended a few women's rights conventions in New York and Boston, and participated in the founding of the New England Women Suffrage Association. Then, she made her intentions known to her friends and neighbors in Hartford by founding the Connecticut Women Association and Society for the Study of Political Science. Isabella followed that up with a petition to the Connecticut General Assembly. With the legal aid of her husband, she wrote and presented a bill that provided married women with property rights. The bill was rejected, but she reintroduced it every year until it passed in 1877.

By 1870, Isabella Beecher Hooker was in the full swing of the suffragist movement traveling throughout the mid-west on her first speaking tour. This first of many tours was in preparation for the 1871 Washington convention on suffrage, which focused on suffrage alone, not women's rights in general. Isabella thought that by building the convention around one issue, she could reunite the divided women's movement. Isabella set the agenda by describing the situation as she saw it, a view in which the constitution provided women with citizenship, and Congress needed only to recognize that fact for women suffrage to be a done deal. This convention got the women's movement in the congressional door, for the first time Congress responded to the women activists with a hearing. Victoria Woodhull led the presentation to the House Judiciary Committee, and Isabella followed; they both presented the convention's argument.

Isabella maintained the constitutional argument for most of the 1870s and used it for the many additional times she spoke before the House Judiciary Committee. Isabella believed this argument partly because she thought it would be too difficult to get a constitutional amendment passed. However, most of the congressmen rejected the suffragists' notions and contended that Congress could not intervene in voter eligibility. However, Isabella felt so strongly that women could already technically vote that she and other women activists tried to vote in the election of 1872. While Susan Anthony succeeded and was arrested, Isabella was unable to penetrate the security at the polling station.

By the mid-1880s, Isabella advocated the more common position that women should vote because they would bring a new level of dignity to politics. Along with her drift in strategy, Isabella Hooker was campaigning for women's rights in general, instead of focusing on suffrage alone. During 1887, Isabella spoke on the need for women to have greater roles in society, including the benefits of female police officers. She digressed on a campaign for police reform than included complete reorganization of New York City's police department, with a woman as superintendent; for this she was mocked by the New York World and the Chicago Tribune.

While Isabella Hooker was derided in New York and Chicago, she had enough national stature that her speaking tours were regularly reported. Furthermore, she gained respect in Hartford, where The Hartford Courant published her lectures from around the country and her congressional addresses. As she wound down her travels she was able to use this avenue to continue her advocacy. By the turn of the century she journeyed less frequently to speak, but maintained her activity by writing letters, and her annual presentation of a voting bill to the Connecticut General Assembly. She made one last appearance before Congress in 1893, where she persuaded various senators to endorse a limited suffrage proposal. Isabella's last appearance before the General Assembly to present the voting bill was in 1901.

== Death ==
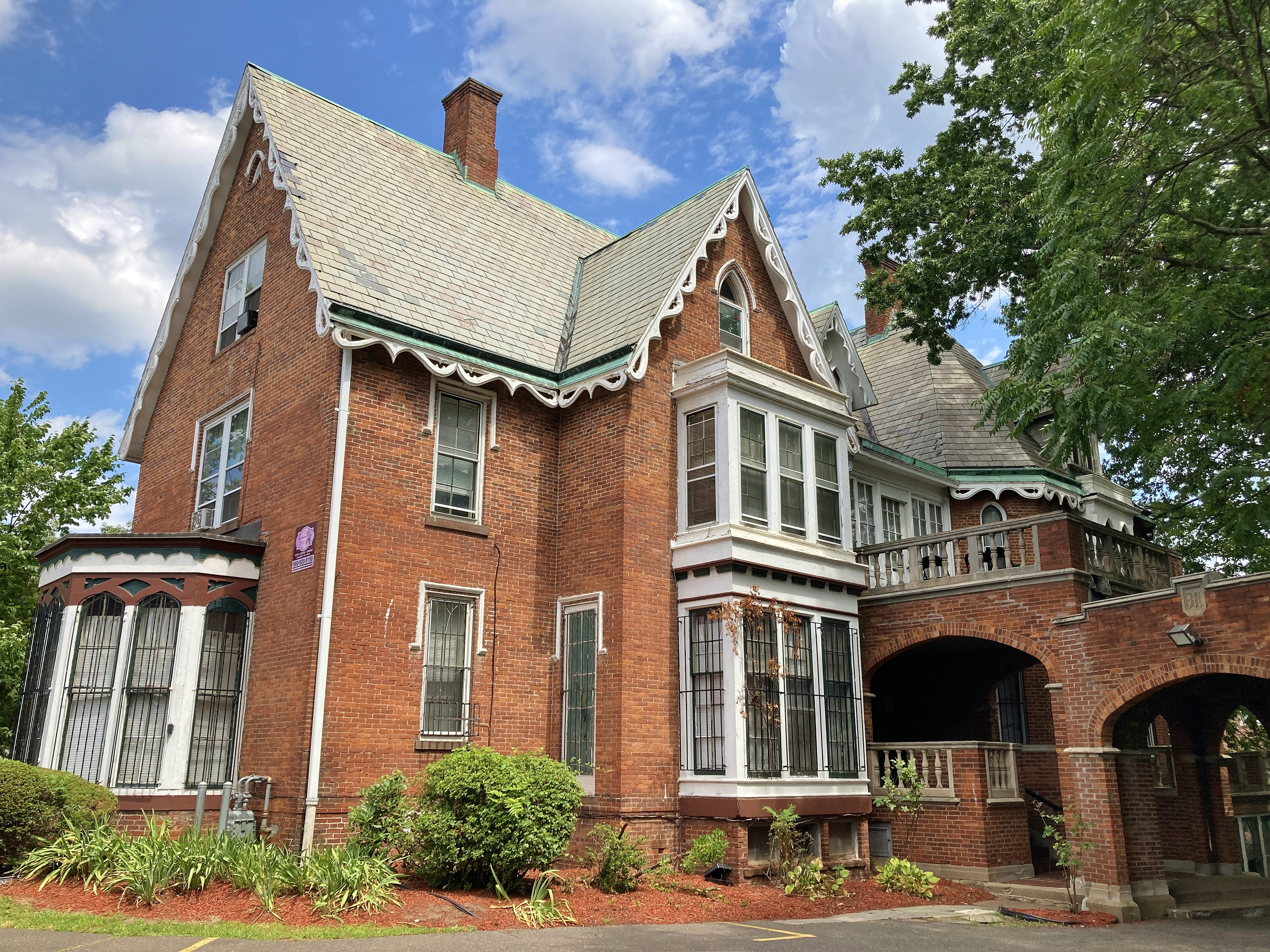
Hartford, Connecticut home where Isabella Beecher Hooker lived with her husband, John Hooker. (August 2022)

Isabella Beecher Hooker was at the side of her half-sister Harriet Beecher Stowe when she died at her Hartford home in 1896. Hooker was crippled by a stroke on January 13, 1907, and died twelve days later. While she died more than a decade before the nineteenth amendment was ratified, her participation in the women's movement saw it transformed from a fringe group to the respectable lobby that succeeded in 1920.
