= Mark Twain bibliography =

About the works of Mark Twain

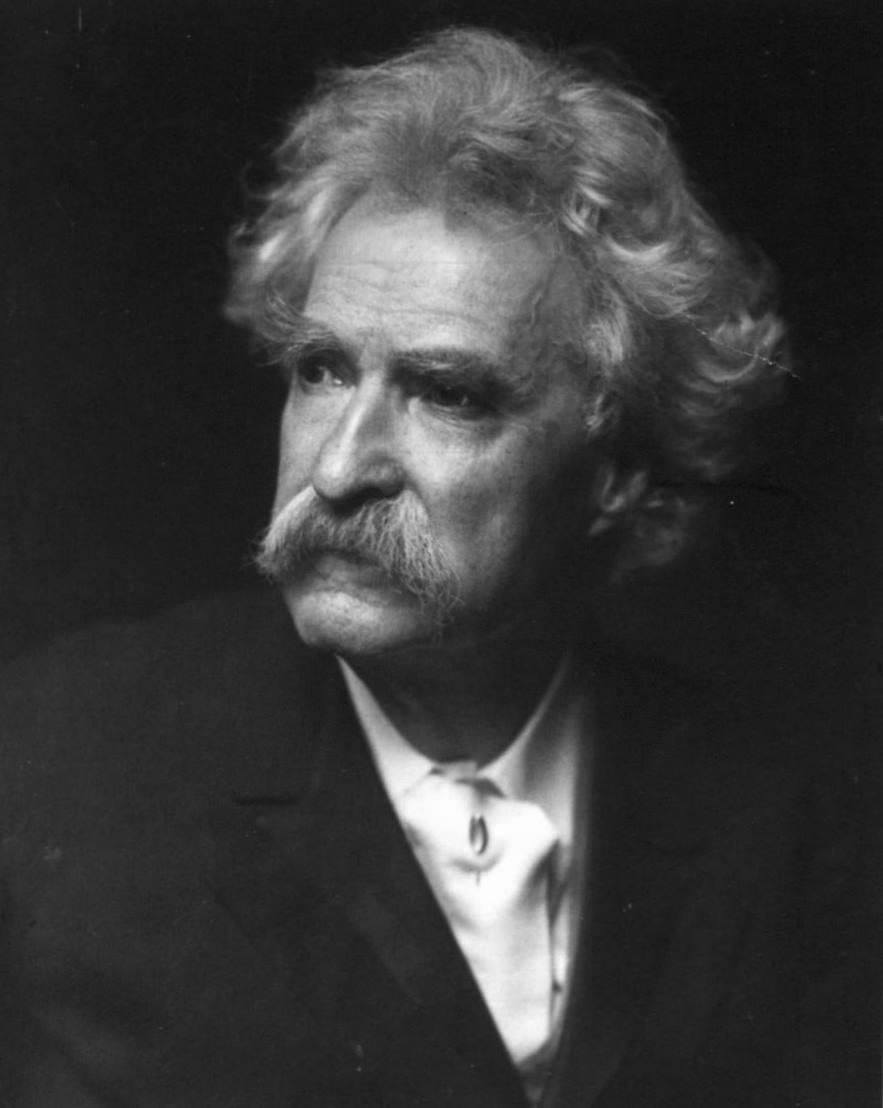
Mark Twain

Samuel Langhorne Clemens (November 30, 1835 – April 21, 1910),⁣ well known by his pen name Mark Twain, was an American author and humorist. Twain is noted for his novels Adventures of Huckleberry Finn (1884), which has been called the "Great American Novel," and The Adventures of Tom Sawyer (1876). He also wrote poetry, short stories, essays, and non-fiction. His big break was "The Celebrated Jumping Frog of Calaveras County" (1867).

== Novels ==
- The Gilded Age: A Tale of Today (1873) (Note: This novel was co-authored with Charles Dudley Warner.)
- The Prince and the Pauper (1881)
- A Connecticut Yankee in King Arthur's Court (1889)
- The American Claimant (1892)
- Pudd'nhead Wilson (1894)
- Personal Recollections of Joan of Arc (1896)
- A Horse's Tale (1907)
- The Mysterious Stranger (1916, posthumous)

== Tom Sawyer and Huckleberry Finn ==
1. The Adventures of Tom Sawyer (1876)
2. Adventures of Huckleberry Finn (1884)
3. Tom Sawyer Abroad (1894)
4. Tom Sawyer, Detective (1896)
5. "Huck Finn and Tom Sawyer Among the Indians" (c. 1884, 9 chapters, unfinished)
6. "Huck Finn" (c. 1897, fragment)
7. "Schoolhouse Hill" (in The Mysterious Stranger) (c. 1898, 6 chapters, unfinished)
8. "Tom Sawyer’s Conspiracy" (c. 1899, 10 chapters, unfinished)
9. "Tom Sawyer’s Gang Plans a Naval Battle" (c. 1900, fragment)

== Adam and Eve ==
- "Extracts from Adam's Diary", illustrated by Frederick Strothmann (1904)
- "Eve's Diary", illustrated by Lester Ralph (1906)
- "The Private Life of Adam and Eve: Being Extracts from Their Diaries, Translated from the Original Mss." (Harper, 1931), LCCN 31-27192 – posthumous issue of the 1904 and 1906 works bound as one, as Twain had requested in a recently discovered letter

== Short stories ==
- "The Celebrated Jumping Frog of Calaveras County" (1865)
- "The Story Of The Bad Little Boy" (1865)
- "General Washington's Negro Body-Servant" (1868)
- "Cannibalism in the Cars" (1868)
- "A Medieval Romance" [1868] (unfinished)
- "My Late Senatorial Secretaryship" (1868)
- Mark Twain vs Blondin 1869 satire letter
- "A Ghost Story" (1870)
- "A True Story, Repeated Word for Word As I Heard It" (1874)
- "Some Learned Fables for Good Old Boys and Girls" (1875)
- "The Story Of The Good Little Boy" (1875)
- "A Literary Nightmare" (1876)
- "A Murder, a Mystery, and a Marriage" (1876)
- "The Canvasser's Tale" (1876)
- "The Invalid's Story" (1877)
- "The Great Revolution in Pitcairn" (1879)
- "1601: Conversation, as it was by the Social Fireside, in the Time of the Tudors" (1880)
- "The McWilliamses and the Burglar Alarm" (1882)
- "The Stolen White Elephant" (1882)
- "Luck" (1891)
- "Those Extraordinary Twins" (1892)
- "Is He Living Or Is He Dead?" (1893)
- "The Esquimau Maiden's Romance" (1893)
- "The Million Pound Bank Note" (1893)
- "The Man That Corrupted Hadleyburg" (1900)
- "A Double Barrelled Detective Story" (1902)
- "A Dog's Tale" (1904)
- "The War Prayer" (1905)
- "Hunting the Deceitful Turkey" (1906)
- "A Fable" (1909)
- "Extract from Captain Stormfield's Visit to Heaven" (1909)
- "My Platonic Sweetheart" (1912, posthumous)
- "The Purloining of Prince Oleomargarine" (2017, posthumous)

== Collections ==
Short story collections

- The Celebrated Jumping Frog of Calaveras County and Other Sketches (1867), short story collection
- Mark Twain's (Burlesque) Autobiography and First Romance (1871), short story collection
- Sketches New and Old (1875), short story collection
- A True Story and the Recent Carnival of Crime (1877), short story collection
- Punch, Brothers, Punch! and Other Sketches (1878), short story collection
- Mark Twain's Library of Humor ("Humour" for the UK edition) (1888), short story collection
- Merry Tales (1892), short story collection
- The £1,000,000 Bank Note and Other New Stories (1893), short story collection
- The $30,000 Bequest and Other Stories (1906), short story collection
- The Curious Republic of Gondour and Other Whimsical Sketches (1919, posthumous), short story collection
- The Washoe Giant in San Francisco (1938, posthumous), short story collection
- Mark Twain's Fables of Man (1972, posthumous), short story collection
- Early Tales & Sketches: 1864-1865 (2 vols. 1981). Edited by Edgar Marquess Branch and Robert H. Hirst. Published for The Iowa Center for Textual Studies by the University of California Press.

Essay collections

- Memoranda (1870–1871), essay collection from Galaxy
- How to Tell a Story and other Essays (1897)
- Europe and Elsewhere (1923, posthumous), edited by Albert Bigelow Paine
- Letters from the Earth (1962, posthumous)
- A Pen Warmed Up In Hell (1972, posthumous)
- The Bible According to Mark Twain (1996, posthumous)

== Essays ==
- "Advice for Good Little Girls" (1865)
- "On the Decay of the Art of Lying" (1880)
- "The Awful German Language" (1880)
- "Advice to Youth" (1882)
- "The Private History of a Campaign That Failed" (1885). Twain's Civil War experiences.
- "Fenimore Cooper's Literary Offenses" (1895)
- "English As She Is Taught" (1897)
- "Concerning the Jews" (1898)
- "My First Lie, and How I Got Out of It" (1899)
- "A Salutation Speech From the Nineteenth Century to the Twentieth" (1900)
- "To the Person Sitting in Darkness" (1901)
- "To My Missionary Critics" (1901)
- "Edmund Burke on Croker and Tammany" (1901)
- "What Is Man?" (1906)
- "Christian Science" (1907)
- "Queen Victoria's Jubilee" (1910)
- "The United States of Lyncherdom" (1923, posthumous)

== Non-fiction ==
- The Innocents Abroad (1869), travel
- Roughing It (1872), travel
- Old Times on the Mississippi (1876), travel
- Some Rambling Notes of an Idle Excursion (1877), travel
- A Tramp Abroad (1880), travel
- Life on the Mississippi (1883), travel
- Following the Equator (sometimes titled "More Tramps Abroad") (1897), travel
- Is Shakespeare Dead? (1909)
- Moments with Mark Twain (1920, posthumous)
- Mark Twain's Notebook (1935, posthumous)

== Other writings ==
- Is He Dead? (1898), play - first published in 2003, and first performed in 2007
- The Battle Hymn of the Republic, Updated (1901), satirical lyric
- King Leopold's Soliloquy (1905), satire
- Little Bessie Would Assist Providence (1908), poem
- Slovenly Peter (1935, posthumous), children's book (Note: This is a translation of the popular German children's book Der Struwwelpeter by Heinrich Hoffmann.)
- Some Thoughts on the Science of Onanism (1879), a speech given to The Stomach Club
- The Mammoth Cod (1902), bawdy humor

== Autobiography and letters ==
- Mark Twain's Autobiography

Chapters from My Autobiography published by North American Review (1906–1907)
Posthumous edition compiled and edited by Albert Bigelow Paine (1924)
Posthumous edition named Mark Twain in Eruption compiled and edited by Bernard DeVoto (1940)
Posthumous edition compiled and edited by Charles Neider
Posthumous edition compiled and edited by Harriet Elinor Smith and the Mark Twain Project: Volume 1 (2010)
Posthumous edition compiled and edited by Robert Hirst and the Mark Twain Project: Volume 2 (2013)
Posthumous edition compiled and edited by Harriet Elinor Smith and the Mark Twain Project: Volume 3 (2015)

- Letters from Hawaii (letters written in 1866, published as a book in 1947)
- Mark Twain's Letters, 1853–1880 (2010, posthumous)
- The Selected Letters of Mark Twain, Charles Neider, ed. New York: Harper & Row, Publishers (1982)
- "Territorial Enterprise letters" being compiled for release in 2017.
- Mark Twain: San Francisco Virginia City Territorial Enterprise Correspondent: Selections from his Letters to the Territorial Enterprise, 1865-1866. Edited by Henry Nash Smith and Frederick Anderson. San Francisco: Book Club of California, 1957.
- Mark Twain's West. Edited by Walter Blair. Chicago: The Lakeside Press, 1983.
