= My Platonic Sweetheart =

- Short story by Mark Twain
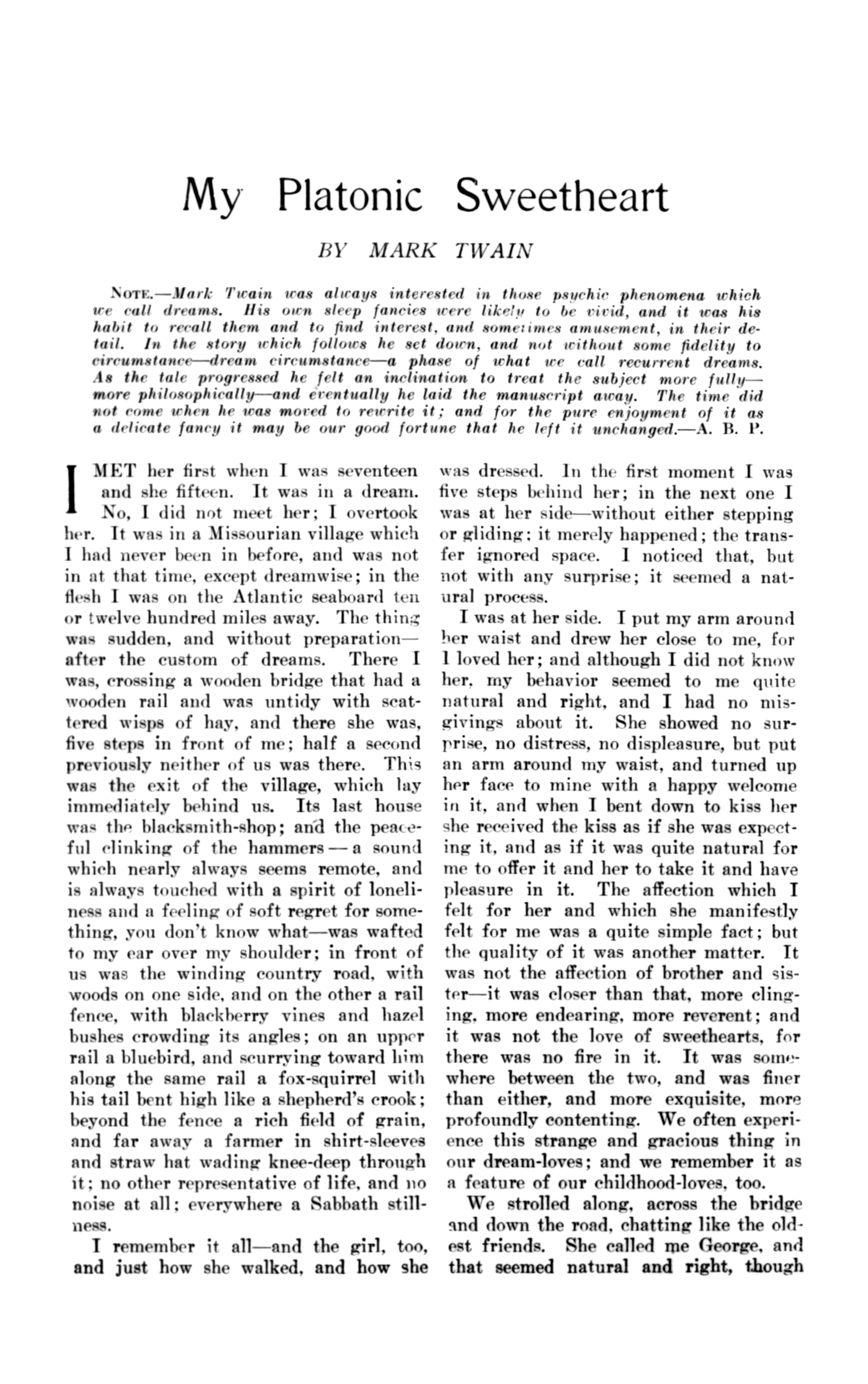
- First page of the story's publication in Harper's Magazine (December 1912)
- Country: United States
- Language: English
- Genre: Fiction

Publication
- Publisher: Harper's Magazine
- Media type: Print (Magazine)
- Publication date: December 1912
- Pages: 7

Chronology
Queen Victoria's Jubilee	The Mysterious Stranger

"My Platonic Sweetheart" is a short dream narrative written by American writer Mark Twain. It was originally titled "The Lost Sweetheart" and written during July and August 1898. It was published more than two years after Twain's death, in the December 1912 issue of Harper's Magazine. The main character (believed to represent Twain) has several dreams throughout his life about the same woman. The narrative depicts five of these dreams, and in each dream the main character and the woman take on different names. The woman's appearance (hair and eye color) also changes in each dream. However, the characters' ages in the dreams remain the same, he is seventeen and she is fifteen, and the two characters never fail to recognize each other.

== Summary ==
In the first dream, the main character's name is George and the woman's name is Alice. The dream takes place in a Missourian village. Alice has blonde hair and blue eyes. George describes their affection as being like "a natural process". They stroll along a country road after exiting a village, and enter an empty log house. Alice soon vanishes after passing through a door, and George follows suit only to find himself standing amidst a cemetery. The log house vanishes and darkness ensues. The main character abruptly awakens, realizes he's in Philadelphia and is actually nineteen years old.

In the second dream, the main character's name is Jack and the woman's name is Helen. Jack meets Helen in a forest near Mississippi. Helen has black hair and dark brown eyes. Jack carries Helen over a shallow stream and continues to carry her for miles on end, because he is "without some sense of fatigue or need of rest." They arrive at a plantation house, Helen's home, and Jack meets Helen's parents. Helen falls asleep and everything becomes pitch black. Then, Jack finds himself standing on a frozen lake. The main character wakes up in grief and is sitting at his workplace, a newspaper office in San Francisco. He is twenty nine years old and has been asleep for less than two minutes.

In the third dream, the main character's name is Robert and the woman's name is Agnes. The dream takes place in San Francisco and in Iao Valley in the Hawaiian Islands. The main character describes how a "dream-language" exists that "shaves meanings finer and closer than do the world's daytime dictionaries". For example, "Rax oha tal" translates to "When you receive this it will remind you that I long to see your face and touch your hand, for the comfort of it and the peace." Agnes passes away in Robert's arms as she is hit by an arrow. The dream ends and the main character is crossing Bond Street in New York with a friend as snow is falling.

In the fourth dream, the main character refers to the woman as Agnes again, but he is unnamed. They chat in a large house in Athens as Socrates passes by. Suddenly, the main character awakens and finds himself in his New York home.

In the fifth dream, the main character and the woman are unnamed. The dream takes place in India and Windsor Castle, England. By the end of their conversation they conclude that "England is the most beautiful of all the countries...because it is so marginal". Once again, the woman disappears. The main character wakes up from his dream and is going on sixty three years old.

The main character concludes that dreams are "deep and strong and sharp and real" while reality is a "vague and dull-tinted artificial world".

== Publication history ==
In August and September 1898, "My Platonic Sweetheart" was offered to the Ladies' Home Journal, Harper's Magazine and The Century Magazine. The first two magazines declined to publish it, and Twain withdrew the story from circulation. It was posthumously published by Harper's Magazine in December 1912, slightly abridged by biographer Albert Bigelow Paine.

== Reception ==
Dale W. Simpson from Missouri Southern State College suggests that the main character represents Mark Twain, as he says this work "may be interpreted as an important self-portrait of the artist," by evidence of Twain's notebook and autobiography. In addition, Simpson asserts that the woman in the narrative does not refer to Laura M. Wright (who allegedly had a brief love affair with Twain), but that the female character is a symbol of innocence, which serves as the "artistic inspiration" that is "representative of his art." It is said that Twain's "concern with the fading of his creative powers must have stirred him to write [this narrative]."

On the contrary, Howard G. Baetzhold of Butler University examines the relationship between Wright and Twain and argues that the woman in the narrative refers to Laura M. Wright, and that she is a source of inspiration for some of Twain's works. Ron Powers of Smithsonian Magazine agrees with Baetzhold, saying "scholar Howard Baetzhold has pieced together overwhelming evidence that the figure in the dream is Laura."

== See also ==
- Mark Twain bibliography
- Mark Twain's Library of Humor
