= What is man? =

What is man? may refer to:

== In literature ==
- Psalm 8, verse 4 begins with this question and may be the origin thereof.
- What Is Man? (Twain essay), essay written by Mark Twain and published in 1906
- What Is Man? (King essay), essay written by Martin Luther King Jr. and published in 1959
- What Is Man?, a book by Wolfhart Pannenberg
- What is Man, a 1970 book by David Jenkins
- What Is Man? a 1923 work by John Arthur Thomson

== In philosophy ==
- What is man?, a philosophical thought by Thomas Hill Green
- What is man?, a theme found in B. F. Skinner's 1971 book Beyond Freedom and Dignity

== In music ==
- "What Is Man", a song by Johnny Cash appearing on the album Personal File
- "What Is Man?", a four-part composition by Charles Lloyd and Billy Higgins appearing on the 2004 album Which Way Is East
