= Gilded Age (disambiguation) =

The Gilded Age is a period of American history from around 1870 to 1900.

Gilded Age may also refer to:

- History of the United States (1865–1918) more broadly
- The Gilded Age: A Tale of Today, an 1873 novel by Mark Twain and Charles Dudley Warner
- The Gilded Age (TV series), an American television series
