= The $30,000 Bequest and Other Stories =

Short story collection by Mark Twain

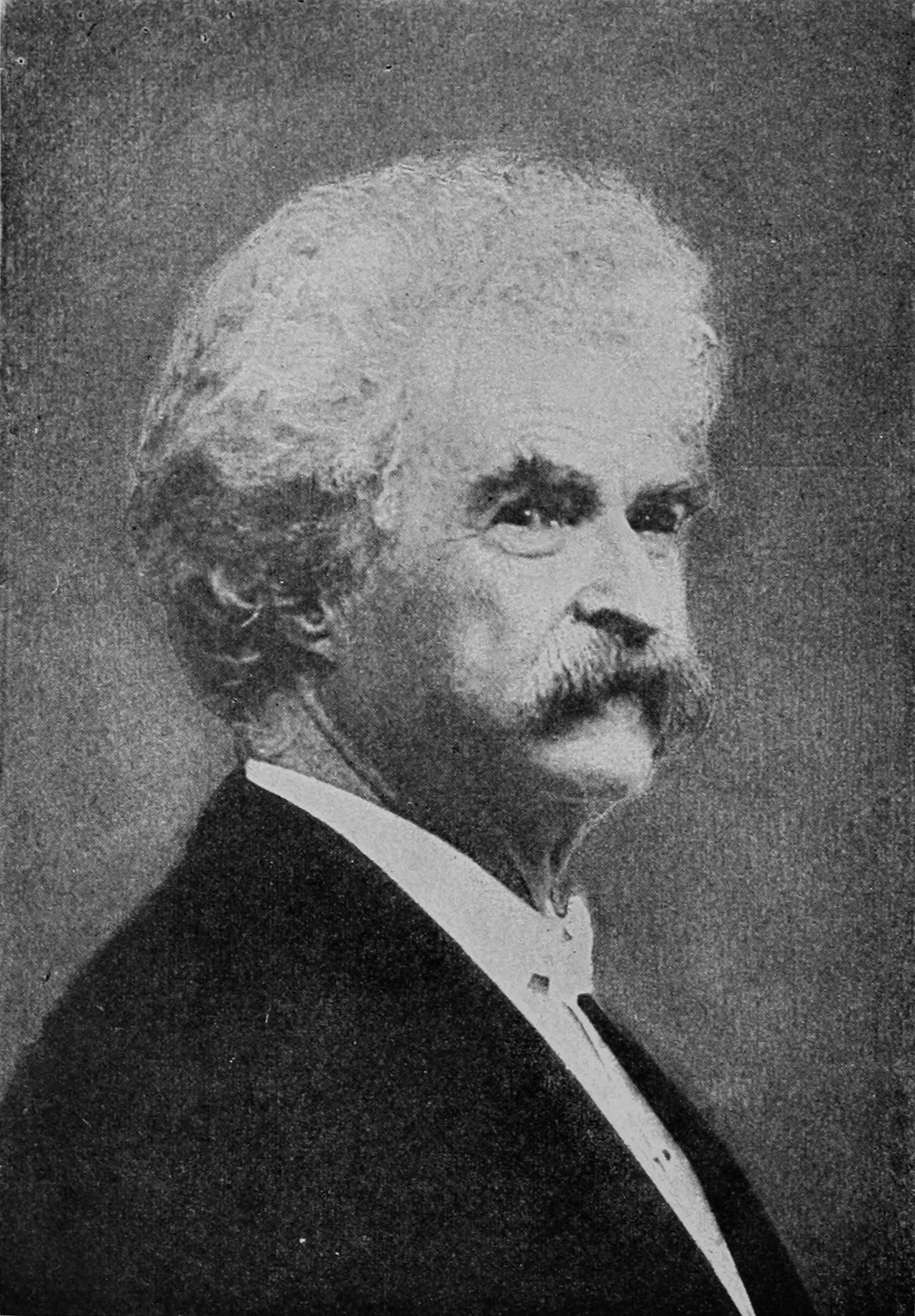
- Frontispiece
- Author: Mark Twain
- Language: English
- Genre: Short stories, comic stories
- Published: 1906
- Publication place: United States
- Media type: Print
- Pages: 523 pp
- Preceded by: The War Prayer
- Followed by: What Is Man?

The $30,000 Bequest and Other Stories (1906) is a collection of thirty comic short stories by the American writer Mark Twain. The stories contained span the course of his career, from "Advice to Young Girls" in 1865 to the titular tale in 1904. Although Twain had ample time to refine his short stories between their original publication date and this collection, there is little evidence to suggest he took an active interest in doing so. "A Burlesque Biography" contains only a few minor technical revisions which make it different from the 1871 version found in Mark Twain's "(Burlesque) Autobiography and First Romance". "Advice to Little Girls" shows slight revision from its earlier publication in The Celebrated Jumping Frog of Calaveras County.

== Publication history ==
In September 1906, Harper and Brothers created another collection of previously published short stories and essays by Mark Twain. They compiled two separate versions of this collection: a trade print issued in red cloth binding with gold cornstalks and an ongoing series for subscription book buyers who had first purchased their sets from American Publishing Company in 1899. By 1906, the American Publishing Company sets contained material that had not yet been incorporated in any of Harper's previous uniform series of books with red cloth bindings. With the publication of The $30,000 Bequest and Other Stories, Harper had the opportunity to even the offerings. Twain did not want either collection to contain duplicate material and ultimately approved Frederick Leigh's plan for the new volume's contents.

In order to accommodate the purchasers of American Publishing Company's uniform editions (issued from 1899–1903), Harper and Brothers bound Volume 24 to match the previous bindings of the earlier editions. Each volume for previous American Publishing Company customers contained the following statement: "This edition is printed by Harper & Brothers, the exclusive publishers of Mark Twain's works, as an accommodation to purchasers of earlier volumes with a view to making their sets uniform". It was up to the former buyers of the American Publishing uniform editions to continue adding volumes to their sets. However, a number of buyers stopped collecting the books. Any set found now that contains more than twenty-two volumes from American Publishing Company is considered rare.

== Contents ==
The collection includes the following stories:

- "The $30,000 Bequest"
- "A Dog's Tale"
- "Was It Heaven? Or Hell?"
- "A Cure for the Blues"
- "The Enemy Conquered; or, Love Triumphant"
- "The Californian's Tale"
- "A Helpless Situation"
- "A Telephonic Conversation"
- "Edward Mills and George Benton: A Tale"
- "The Five Boons of Life"
- "The First Writing Machines"
- "Italian Without a Master"
- "Italian With Grammar"
- "A Burlesque Biography"
- "How To Tell A Story"
- "General Washington's Negro Body-Servant"
- "Wit Inspirations of the "Two Year-Olds""
- "An Entertaining Article"
- "A Letter to the Secretary of the Treasury"
- "Amended Obituaries"
- "A Monument to Adam"
- "A Humane Word from Satan"
- "Introduction to "The New Guide of the Conversation in Portuguese and English""
- "Advice to Little Girls"
- "Post-Mortem Poetry"
- "The Danger of Lying in Bed"
- "Portrait of King William III"
- "Does the Race of Man Love a Lord?"
- "Extracts from Adam's Diary"
- "Eve's Diary"
