= Bernard L. Shientag =

American judge

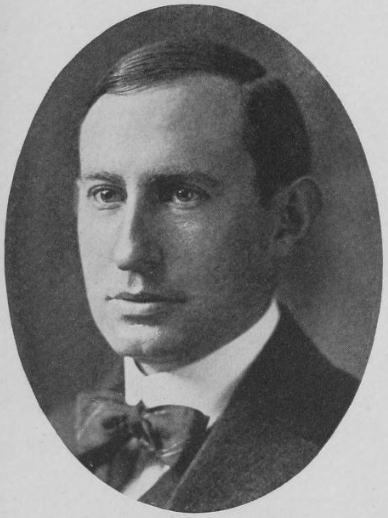
- Born: Bernard Lloyd Shientag; April 13, 1887; New York, New York, US
- Died: May 23, 1952 (aged 65); New York, New York, US
- Burial place: Mount Judah Cemetery
- Education: College of the City of New York; Columbia Law School; Columbia University School of Political Science
- Occupation(s): Lawyer, judge
- Spouse: Florence Perlow (m. 1938)

Bernard Lloyd Shientag (April 13, 1887 – May 23, 1952), was a Jewish-American lawyer and judge from New York.

== Life ==
Shientag was born on April 13, 1887, in New York City, New York, the son of Solomon Shientag and Fannie Jacobs.

Shientag graduated from the College of the City of New York with an A.B. in 1904, Columbia Law School with an LL.B. in 1908, and Columbia University School of Political Science with an A.M. in 1908. He was admitted to the bar in 1908 and practiced law in the office of James, Schell & Elkus. He then worked as associate counsel of the state factory investigating committee from 1911 to 1915. In 1913, he was an assistant in the bill drafting department. In 1918, he was an examiner in the office of the President of the New York City Board of Alderman, Al Smith. From 1919 to 1920, he was chief counsel of the New York State Industrial Commission.

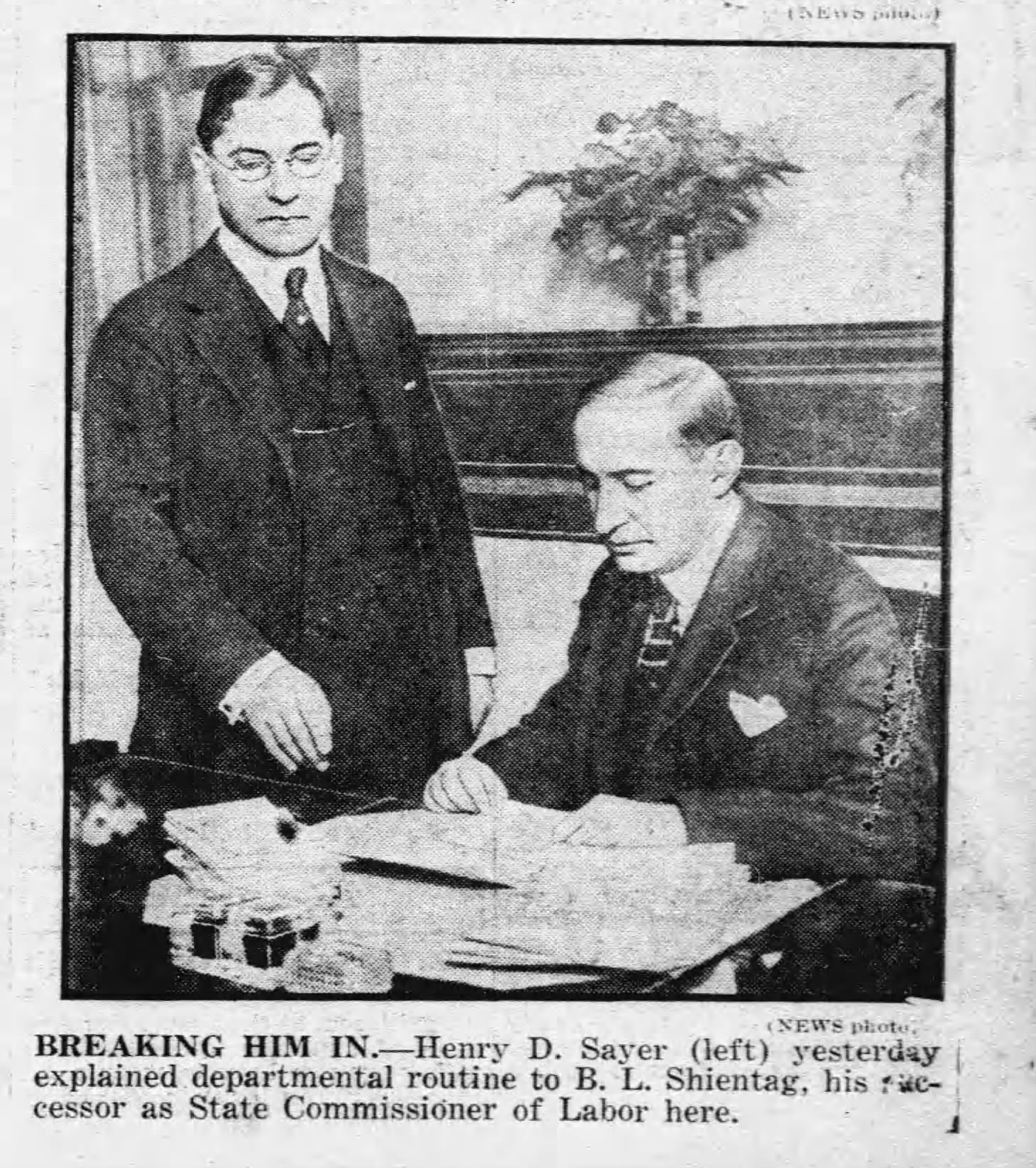
Henry D. Sayer (left) discussing the job with his successor, Shientag, as Industrial Commissioner

In 1923, Governor Smith appointed him Industrial Commissioner and head of the New York State Department of Labor. At different points during that time he served as a member and counsel of the State Housing Commission, the Child Welfare Commission, and the Cloak and Suit Industry Mediation Commission. He was also named Federal Director of Employment of the State of New York.

Shientag was in Governor Smith's inner circle of advisors in the governor's push for progressive legislation. In 1924, the governor appointed him a Justice on the City Court. He was elected to the office in 1925. In 1930, Governor Roosevelt appointed him to the New York Supreme Court. He was elected to a full term later that year. He was designated to the Appellate Term from 1934 to 1935 and 1938. In 1947, Governor Dewey appointed him to the Appellate Division, First Judicial Department. He sat as Justice on that court until his death. In 1950, he was one of the justices that disbarred Alger Hiss from practicing in the state of New York. In 1947, he ruled against when the latter tried to bar the publication of a biography. In 1949, he ruled the owners of the Mark Twain manuscript did not have the right to publish A Murder, a Mystery, and a Marriage.

Shientag was a trustee of the National Consumers League and a director of the Y.M.H.A. He was a member of the New York City Bar Association, the New York County Lawyers' Association, the New York State Bar Association, the American Bar Association, the Academy of Political Science, and the Independent Order of B'nai B'rith. He also wrote a number of books and essays on legal topics. In 1938, he married Florence Perlow. They had no children. Florence was a lawyer as well, serving as law secretary for Mayor LaGuardia, clerk for Special New York County Prosecutor Thomas Dewey, judge for the Domestic Relations Court, Assistant United States Attorney for the Southern District of New York, the first woman to successfully argue a First Amendment case before the U.S. Supreme Court, and president of the New York Women's Bar Association.

Shientag died at home from a heart attack on May 23, 1952. He was buried in Mount Judah Cemetery in Ridgewood.
