= Advice to Youth =

1882 satirical essay by Mark Twain

"Advice to Youth" is a satirical essay written by Mark Twain in 1882. Twain was asked by persons unspecified to write something "to [the] youth." While the exact audience of his speech is uncertain, it is most probably American; in his posthumous collected works, editor's notes have conjecturally assigned the address to the Boston Saturday Morning Club. In the essay, Twain speaks primarily of advice which can be broken into six specific topics. These include: selective obedience towards parents, respecting superiors, the wisdom of going to bed early and waking up early, lying, firearm etiquette, and the importance of good books.

This essay is a classic example of Juvenalian satire. This satirical mode can be seen in Mark Twain's recurrent employment of sarcasm while addressing the youth with his words of wisdom. Interpreted by scholars as a critique of authority, Twain's "Advice to Youth" may have been a topical response to the prohibition of alcohol in Kansas in 1881, a legislative action which many residents found deeply upsetting.

In "Advice to Youth," Mark Twain humorously advises young people on how to navigate life. His guidance touches on topics like obedience to parents, the importance of lying, and the use of firearms. Though the advice appears straightforward, Twain's underlying critique is aimed at exposing the absurdity of certain societal norms, including superstitions. Twain uses irony and exaggeration to make readers reflect on the irrationality of some beliefs that parents often pass down to their children.
