= A Double Barrelled Detective Story =

1902 novelette by Mark Twain

A Double-Barrelled Detective Story
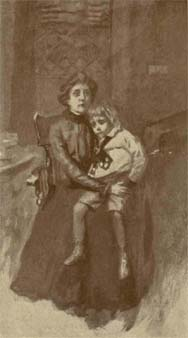
- Frontispiece of A Double-Barrelled Detective Story
- Author: Mark Twain
- Illustrator: Lucius Hitchcock
- Language: English
- Published: 1902 (Harper & Brothers)
- Publication place: United States
- Media type: Print (hardback)
- Pages: 179
- OCLC: 1824124

A Double Barreled Detective Story is a short story/novelette by Mark Twain (Samuel Clemens), in which Sherlock Holmes finds himself in the American west.

== Summary ==
The story contains two arcs of revenges. In the primary arc, a rich young woman is abused, humiliated and abandoned by her new husband, Jacob Fuller, whom she married against the wishes of her father. The young Fuller resents her father's rejection and dismissal of him as a ne'er-do-well and resolves to exact his revenge by mistreating his new bride. After his abandonment, she bears a son, whom she names Archy Stillman. When the child gets older, the mother discovers that he possesses an incredible ability of smell, like a bloodhound. The mother instructs her child, now sixteen, to seek out his biological father with the intent of destroying that man's peace and reputation, and hence extracting satisfaction for her.

Five years later in a second arc, at a mining camp in California, Fetlock Jones, a nephew of Sherlock Holmes, kills his master Flint Buckner, a silver-miner, by blowing up his cabin. Since this occurs when Holmes happens to be visiting, Holmes applies his skills to bear upon the case and derives a logically worked conclusion that is proved to be abysmally wrong by Archy Stillman using his sense of smell. This could be seen by the reader as yet another piece where Twain tried to prove that life does not quite follow logic.

This is a satire by Twain on the mystery novel genre. In the second arc, Sherlock Holmes is depicted in employing "scientific methods" to a ridiculous degree, yet arriving at a completely wrong assessment. On the other hand, the crime is solved with a supernatural ability that no normal human possesses. Yet even this fails to reveal the whole truth, as the final twist of the story indicates.

Furthermore, Sam Clemens/Mark Twain broke through the "fourth wall" and appeared as himself in the middle of the story, supposedly while the story was being serialized, and responded to letters sent in by readers to the newspaper editor. During the exchange, Twain made fun of/self-advertised some of his other famous short stories.

== See also ==
- Mark Twain bibliography
