= The American Claimant =

Novel by Mark Twain

- First edition
- Author: Mark Twain
- Illustrator: Dan Beard
- Language: English
- Genre: Humor, Satire, alternate history, science fiction, fantasy
- Publisher: Charles L. Webster
- Publication date: 1892
- Publication place: United States
- Media type: Print (Hardcover, Paperback)
- Pages: 291 pp

The American Claimant is an 1892 novel by American humorist and writer Mark Twain. Twain wrote the novel with the help of phonographic dictation, the first author (according to Twain himself) to do so. This was also (according to Twain) an attempt to write a book without mention of the weather, the first of its kind in fictitious literature (although the first sentence of the second paragraph references weather: "breezy fine morning"). Indeed, all the weather is contained in an appendix, at the back of the book, which the reader is encouraged to turn to from time to time.

== Plot ==
The American Claimant is a comedy of mistaken identities and multiple role switches. Its cast of characters include an American enamored of British hereditary aristocracy and a British earl entranced by American democracy.

== Characters ==
Colonel Mulberry Sellers: An eccentric white-headed old man who becomes the rightful heir to the Earl of Rossmore after the death of his relative, Simon Lathers. According to his wife, Sellers is a "scheming, generous, good-hearted, moonshiny, hopeful, no-account failure" who is well beloved for his generosity and approachability. Although many of his eccentric money-making schemes are failures, he occasionally "makes a strike," as he calls it, and makes quite a bit of money. One such strike is an exceedingly popular toy, "Pigs in the Clover," which he invents and patents.

According to the tin signs by his door, Sellers is an attorney at law and claim agent, a materializer, a hypnotizer, and a mind-cure dabbler. He has also been named "Perpetual Member of the Diplomatic Body representing the multifarious sovereignties and civilizations of the globe near the republican court of the United States of America."

The explanatory note at the beginning of the novel indicates that Colonel Sellers is the same character as Eschol Sellers in the first edition of Twain's earlier novel Gilded Age (1873) and Beriah Sellers in later editions. The note also identifies Colonel Sellers as the same character as Mulberry Sellers in John T. Raymond's dramatization of Gilded Age.

Washington Hawkins: The Congressional Delegate from Cherokee Strip in the far west, who partners with Colonel Sellers in several of his schemes. Hawkins is described as a "stoutish, discouraged-looking man whose general aspect suggested that he was fifty years old, but whose hair swore to a hundred." At the beginning of the novel he has been living with his wife, Louise, and their children for the last fifteen years.

Sally (Gwendolen) Sellers: Daughter of Colonel Mulberry Sellers and Polly Sellers. She attends Rowena-Ivanhoe College, "the selectest and most aristocratic seat of learning for young ladies" in the US. Like her father, Sally is given to Romantic aspirations and delusions of grandeur. She happily takes the name Gwendolen after her father becomes the rightful heir of the Earl of Rossmore. However, the narrative describes Sally as having a "double personality": She is both Sally Sellers, who is "practical and democratic," and Lady Gwendolen, who is "romantic and aristocratic." During the day she works hard designing and sewing dresses to help financially support her family, and in the evening she upholds the shadowy fantasy of the family's nobility. She falls in love with Howard Tracy (Viscount Berkeley) at first sight and later renounces her aspirations of aristocracy in order to be with him.

Berkeley Rossmore (Howard Tracy): The only son and heir of the Earl of Rossmore. According to the narrative, his full name is the Honourable Kirkcudbright Llanover Marjoribanks Sellers Viscount-Berkeley, of Cholmondeley Castle, Warwickshire(which the narrative tells us is pronounced "K'koobry Thlanover Marshbanks Sellers Vycount Barkly, of Chumly Castle, Warrikshr"). At the beginning of the novel, Berkeley announces his intention to go to America and "change places" with Simon Lathers, the man he considers the rightful heir. He wishes to "retire...from a false existence, a false position, and begin [his] life over again, begin it right--begin it on the level of mere manhood, unassisted by factitious aids, and succeed or fail by pure merit or the want of it. I will go to America, where all men are equal and all have an equal chance; I will live or die, sink or swim, win or lose as just a man—that alone, and not a single helping gaud or fiction back of it." Shortly after his arrival to the United States, the hotel in which he is staying catches fire. During his escape, Berkeley snatches up the cowboy hat and distinctive clothes of a bank robber from the Cherokee Strip whom, coincidentally, Hawkins has been ineffectually tracking. When Berkeley is seen in this garb, Hawkins and Colonel Sellers believe that this cowboy-hatted man is the desperado; everyone else believes that he is an English cowboy. After the newspapers announce that Berkeley has died in the fire, he decides to renounce his former identity and calls himself Howard Tracy, determining to work for his living according to democratic principles.

== Gallery ==
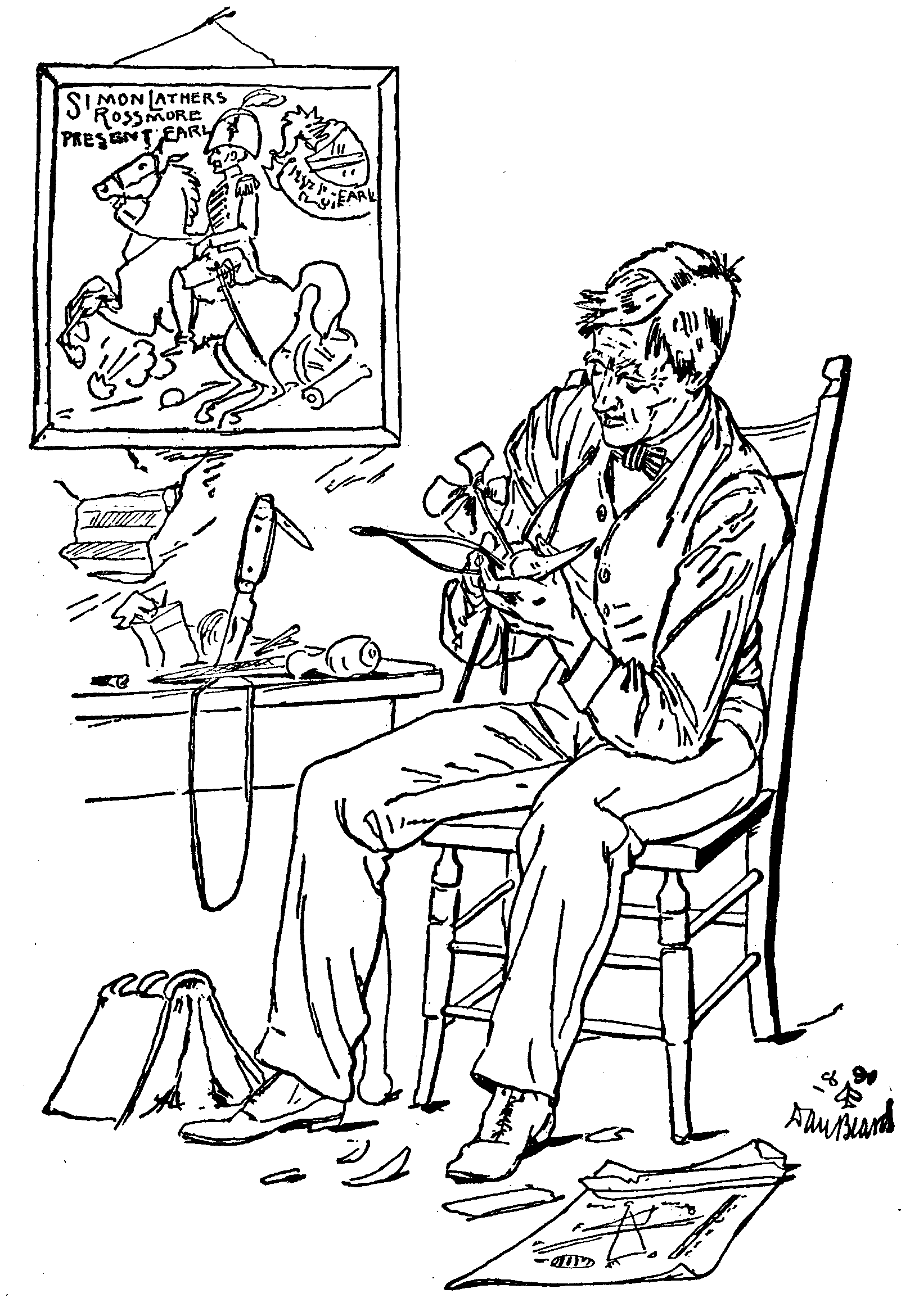
"He was constructing what seemed to be some kind of frail mechanical toy". Illustration to 1896 edition.

== See also ==
- Mark Twain bibliography
