= Advice for Good Little Girls =

Short story by Mark Twain

- Author: Mark Twain
- Illustrator: Vladimir Radunsky
- Language: English
- Publisher: Enchanted Lion Books
- Publication date: 2013-04-02
- ISBN: 9781592701292

"Advice for Good Little Girls" is a humorous essay by Mark Twain, first published in 1865, which lists satirical pieces of advice for how young girls should behave. The Routledge Encyclopedia of Mark Twain called it an early precursor to Twain's satirical youth novels Tom Sawyer and Huckleberry Finn.

== Background ==
"Advice for Good Little Girls" first appeared in the California Youth's Companion in 1865, as a companion piece to a similar but longer essay, "Advice for Good Little Boys." The essay was reprinted in The Celebrated Jumping Frog of Calaveras County, and Other Sketches (1867), and was later included in Twain's The $30,000 Bequest and Other Stories (1906), under the title "Advice to Little Girls".

As a satirical retort to the didactic child-rearing literature common at the time, Twain lists subversive, facetious pieces of advice for girls, often encouraging mischievous behavior. These include "You ought never to 'sass' old people unless they 'sass' you first" and "You ought never to take your little brother's 'chewing-gum' away from him by main force; it is better to rope him in with the promise of the first two dollars and a half you find floating down the river on a grindstone."

The essay was republished as a picture book by Enchanted Lion Press in 2013, under the title "Advice to Little Girls", with illustrations by Vladimir Radunsky. The re-release was praised by outlets including NPR and the Los Angeles Times, which called it "as essential today as it was a century-and-a-half ago."
