= Following the Equator =

1897 travelogue by Mark Twain

- Following the Equator cover
- Author: Mark Twain
- Language: English
- Genre: Travel literature
- Publisher: American Publishing Company
- Publication date: 1897
- Publication place: United States
- Media type: Print
- Pages: 718
- Preceded by: Personal Recollections of Joan of Arc
- Followed by: A Dog's Tale

Following the Equator (sometimes titled More Tramps Abroad) is a non-fiction social commentary in the form of a travelogue published by Mark Twain in 1897.

Twain was practically bankrupt in 1894 due to investing heavily into the failed Paige Compositor. In an attempt to extricate himself from debt of $100,000 (equivalent of about $2,975,000 in 2020) he undertook a tour of the British Empire in 1895 at age 60, a route chosen to provide numerous opportunities for lectures in English.

The first edition of this book was illustrated by Dan Beard, A. B. Frost, B .W. Clinedinst, Frederick Dielman, Peter Newell, F. M. Senior, C. H. Warren, A. G. Reinhart, F. Berkeley Smith and C. Allan Gilbert, many of whom had previously worked with Twain. In England the book was published under the title More Tramps Abroad.

American songwriter Jimmy Buffett mentions the book in his songs "Take Another Road" and "That's What Living Is To Me".

== Themes ==
Throughout the book, Twain uses the opportunity of visiting the various locations on his tour to espouse "perceptive descriptions and discussions of people, climate, flora and fauna, indigenous cultures, religion, customs, politics, food, and many other topics". The book contains a significant amount of social commentary, although much of it is done in a satirical manner.

Although this social commentary is the great import of the book, it is notable that Twain also included a number of fictional stories in the body of what is otherwise a non-fiction work. In particular, the story of how Cecil Rhodes made his fortune – by finding a newspaper in the belly of a shark – and the story of how a man named Ed Jackson made good in life out of a fake letter of introduction to Cornelius Vanderbilt, were anthologized in Charles Neider (ed) The Complete Short Stories of Mark Twain, (Doubleday, 1957) where they are presented as fiction.
