= Extract from Captain Stormfield's Visit to Heaven =

American short story

- Short story by Mark Twain
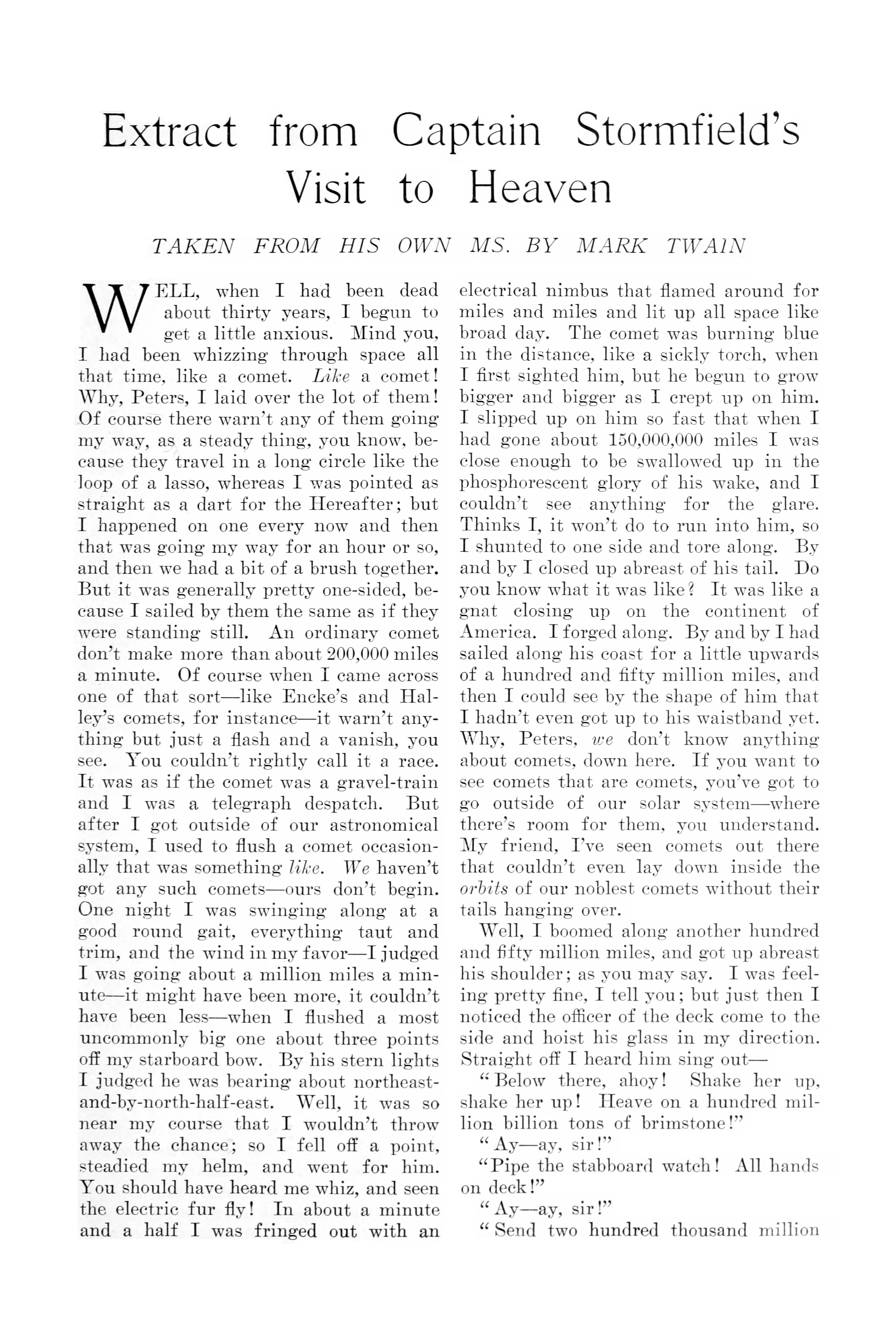
- First page from the first printing in Harper's Magazine, December 1907

Text available at Wikisource
- Country: United States
- Language: English

Publication
- Publisher: Harper & Brothers
- Media type: Print (hardback)
- Publication date: 1909
- Pages: 121

Chronology
Is Shakespeare Dead?	Letters from the Earth

"Extract from Captain Stormfield's Visit to Heaven" is a short story written by American writer Mark Twain. It first appeared in print in Harper's Magazine in December 1907 and January 1908, and was published in book form with some revisions in 1909. This was the last story published by Twain during his life.

== Description and plot outline ==
The story follows Captain Elias Stormfield on his decades long cosmic journey to Heaven; his accidental misplacement after racing a comet; his short-lived interest in singing and playing the harp (generated by his preconceptions of heaven); and the general obsession of souls with the celebrities of Heaven such as Adam, Moses, and Elijah, who according to Twain become as distant to most people in Heaven as living celebrities are on Earth. Twain uses this story to show his view that the common conception of Heaven is ludicrous, and points out the incongruities of such beliefs with his characteristic adroit usage of hyperbole.

Much of the story's description is given by the character Sandy McWilliams, a cranberry farmer who is very experienced in the ways of Heaven. Sandy gives Stormfield, a newcomer, the description in the form of a conversational question-and-answer session. The Heaven described by him is similar to the conventional Christian Heaven, but includes a larger version of all the locations on Earth, as well as of everywhere in the universe (the mention of which, albeit as a backdrop, is the last science fiction element). All sentient life-forms travel to Heaven, often through interplanetary or interstellar space, and land at a particular gate (which are without number), which is reserved for people from that originating planet. Each newcomer must then give his name and planet of origin to a gatekeeper, who sends him in to Heaven. Once inside, the being spends eternity living as they think fit, usually according to its true (sometimes undiscovered) talent. According to one of the characters, a cobbler who "has the soul of a poet in him won't have to make shoes here," implying that he would instead turn to poetry and achieve perfection in it. On special occasions a procession of the greatest people in history is formed; on this particular occasion this includes Buddha, William Shakespeare, Homer, Muhammed, Daniel, Ezekiel, and Jeremiah plus several otherwise unknown people whose talents far exceeded those of the world's pivotal figures, but who were never famous on Earth.

As Stormfield proceeds through Heaven he learns that the conventional image of angels as winged, white-robed figures bearing haloes, harps, and palm leaves is a mere illusion generated for the benefit of humans, who mistake "figurative language" for accurate description (the wings are part of their uniforms, and not functionally wings); that all of Heaven's denizens choose their ages, thus aligning themselves with the time of life at which they were most content; that anything desired is awarded to its seeker, if it does not violate any prohibition; that the prohibitions themselves are different from those envisioned on Earth; that each of the Earth-like regions of Heaven includes every human being who has ever lived on it; that families are not always together forever, because of decisions made by those who have died first; that white-skinned people are a minority in Heaven; that kings are not kings in Heaven (Charles II is a comedian while Henry VI has a religious book-stand), etc.

== Background ==
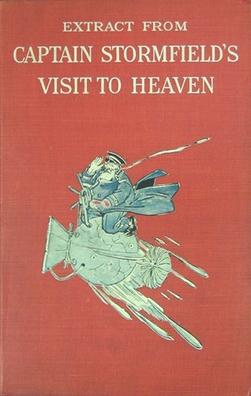
First edition 1909

Although not published until 1907 in Harper's Magazine, followed by a slim book version with some revisions in 1909, the story was quite old. The original manuscript dated back perhaps as far as 1868, and an 1873 version has survived. The story was revised several times, and chapters 3 and 4 of the manuscript became the Harper's story. Longer versions of the manuscript have subsequently been published, including one edited by Dixon Wector which appeared as part of Report from Paradise (1952), and in part 1 of Mark Twain's Quarrel with Heaven: "Captain Stormfield's Visit to Heaven" And Other Sketches" (Ray B. Browne, ed., 1970). Twain claimed that the story in its early version was a satire of Elizabeth Stuart Phelps Ward's The Gates Ajar, a very popular novel published in 1868.

== Cultural references ==
The story mentions several public figures who were widely known at the time of first publication, but are not as well known today. These include Moody and Sankey, Charles Peace, Thomas De Witt Talmage and Prince Gortschakoff.

== Adaptations ==
=== Film versions ===
In the 1985 claymation movie The Adventures of Mark Twain, "Extract from Captain Stormfield's Visit to Heaven" is one of the many adapted works, however the plot of the adaptation is very different to the original story. In it we are introduced to Stormfield as he is contacted by Mark Twain. While Stormfield is chasing 'his own comet' Twain asks him where he is going to which Stormfield says he's going to heaven. He then lands head-first into a cloud with a door marked 'heaven' (which is more akin to the entrance of a nightclub), and he is greeted by a blue, 3-headed, slug-like creature who asks him where he is from. When Stormfield says he is from San Francisco he is made fun of by the creature who mocks him for not understanding he meant what planet he was from. After some more misunderstandings the creature lets Stormfield into heaven but before he goes in he asks where his wreath, halo, hymnbook and palm branch are (all objects featured in stereotypical heaven descriptions) to which the creature tells him "Oh, trust me, you won't be conspicuous in this district without it". When he actually enters 'heaven' he is shocked and appalled to find out that everyone else is also one of the slug creatures and they partake in irreligious, immoral and degenerate acts such as drinking, smoking, raving etc. Stormfield leaves and comes to the realization that "A man has got to be in his own heaven to be happy". The slug creature agrees and tells him "Did you imagine that the same heaven would suit all sorts of people?". Stormfield then jumps to another cloud where he is met by Saint Peter in front of the stereotypical Pearly Gates who gives him all the items Stormfield expected. When Stormfield tries to talk he is constantly shushed by both Peter and the gates themselves. The segment ends with Twain saying "A harp, a hymnbook and wings? Good God, what a swindle. I'm led to consider a different path. Heaven for climate, hell for company."
