= Is Shakespeare Dead? =

1909 literary work by Mark Twain

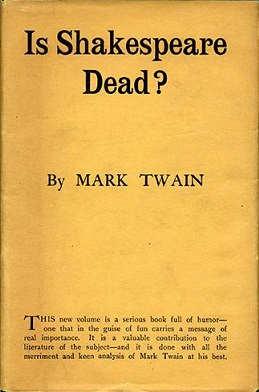
- First edition book cover
- Author: Mark Twain
- Language: English
- Genre: Non-fiction
- Publisher: Harper & Brothers
- Publication date: 1909
- Publication place: United States
- Media type: Print (hardback)
- Pages: 149
- OCLC: 751341
- Preceded by: A Horse's Tale
- Followed by: Extract from Captain Stormfield's Visit to Heaven

Is Shakespeare Dead? is a short, semi-autobiographical work by American humorist Mark Twain. It explores the controversy over the authorship of the Shakespearean literary canon via satire, anecdote, and extensive quotation of contemporary authors on the subject.

== Summary ==
In the book, Twain expounds the view that Shakespeare of Stratford was not the author of the canon, and lends tentative support to the Baconian theory. The book opens with a scene from his early adulthood, where he was trained to be a steamboat pilot by an elder who often argued with him over the controversy.

Twain's arguments include the following points:

- That little was known about Shakespeare's life, and the bulk of his biographies were based on conjecture.
- That a number of eminent British barristers and judges found Shakespeare's plays permeated with precise legal thought, and that the author could only have been a veteran legal professional.
- That in contrast, Shakespeare of Stratford had never held a legal position or office, and had only been in court over petty lawsuits late in life.
- That small towns lionize and celebrate their famous authors for generations, but this had not happened in Shakespeare's case. He described his own fame in Hannibal as a case in point.

Twain draws parallels and analogies from the pretensions of modern religious figures and commentators on the nature of Satan. He compares the believers in Shakespeare to adherents of Arthur Orton and Mary Baker Eddy.

== Reputation ==
The book has been described as "one of his least well received and most misunderstood works". Karen Lystra argues that the essay reveals satirical intentions that went beyond the Shakespeare-Bacon controversy of the time, although she admits that Twain appears to have been sincere in his beliefs concerning Shakespeare.

Though it is commonly assumed to be nothing more than a stale and embarrassing rehash of the Shakespeare-Bacon controversy, Twain was up to something more than flimsy literary criticism. He was using the debate over Shakespeare's real identity to satirize prejudice, intolerance, and self-importance—in himself as well as others.... But after his passionate diatribe against the "Stratfordolators" and his vigorous support of the Baconians, he cheerfully admits that both sides are built on inference. Leaving no doubt about his satirical intent, Twain then gleefully subverts his entire argument. After seeming to be a serious, even angry, combatant, he denies that he intended to convince anyone that Shakespeare was not the real author of his works. "It would grieve me to know that any one could think so injuriously of me, so uncomplimentarily, so unadmiringly of me," he writes mockingly. "Would I be so soft as that, after having known the human race familiarly for nearly seventy-four years?" We get our beliefs at second hand, he explains, "we reason none of them out for ourselves. It is the way we are made." Twain has set a trap—an elaborate joke at the expense of what he scornfully refers to as the "Reasoning Race." He is satirizing the need to win an argument when it is virtually impossible to convince anyone to change sides in almost any debate. His excessive rhetoric of attack is obviously absurd—calling the other side "thugs," for example—yet it has been taken at face value.
