= The Man That Corrupted Hadleyburg =

1899 satirical novella by Mark Twain

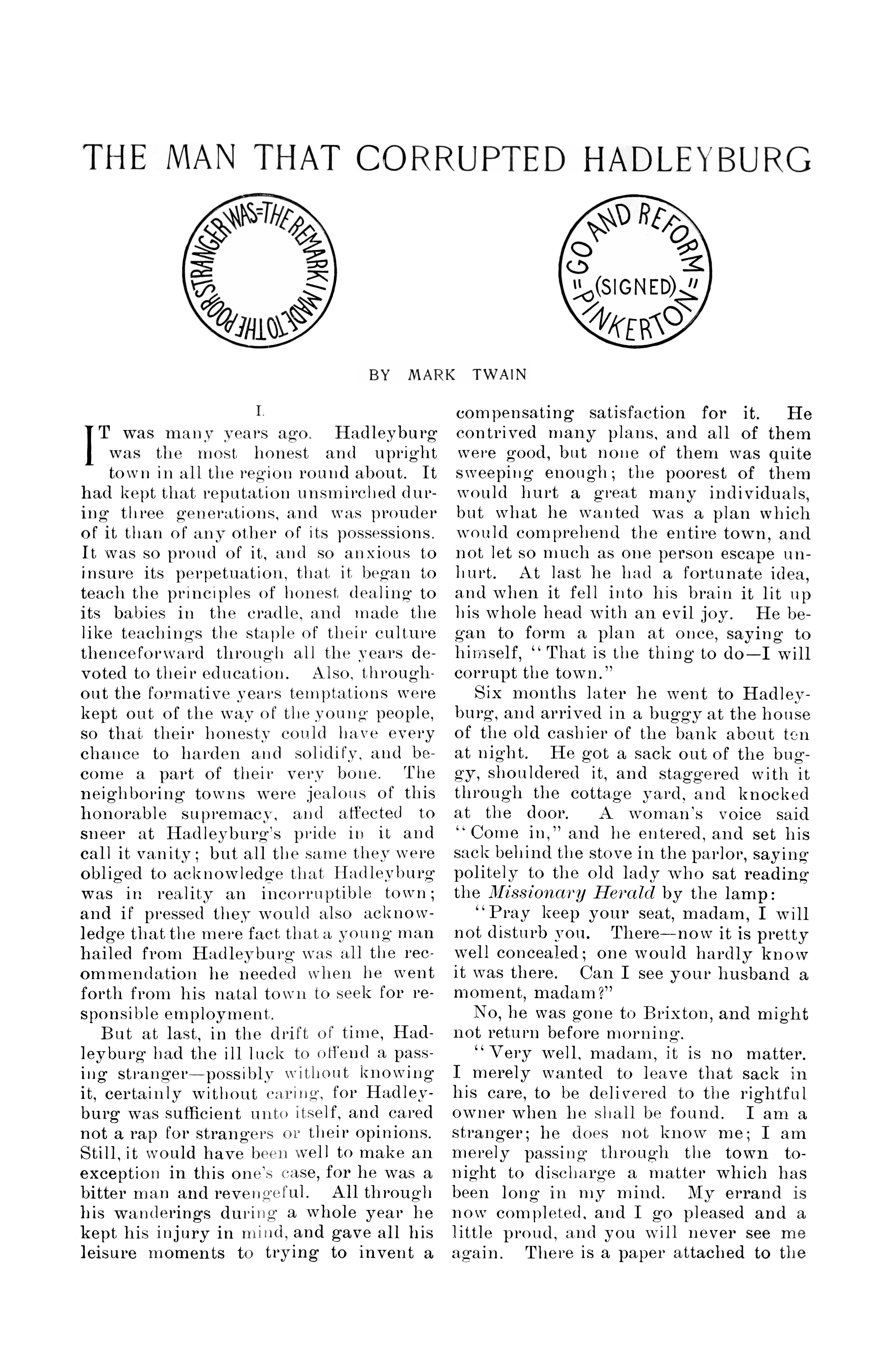
- First page of the first printing of the story in Harper's Magazine (December 1899)
- Author: Mark Twain
- Language: English
- Genre: Novella, satire
- Publisher: Harper's Magazine
- Publication date: December 1899
- Publication place: United States
- Media type: Print (magazine)
- Preceded by: Is He Dead?
- Followed by: A Salutation Speech From the Nineteenth Century to the Twentieth

"The Man That Corrupted Hadleyburg" is a satirical novella by Mark Twain. It first appeared in Harper's Monthly in December 1899, and was subsequently published by Harper & Brothers in the collection The Man That Corrupted Hadleyburg and Other Stories and Essays (1900). Some see this story "as a replay of the Garden of Eden story", and associate the corrupter of the town with Satan.

In the story, a town has gained a reputation for incorruptibility. Its population is trained to avoid temptation. An offended stranger seeks revenge against the town's population, and starts tempting them with a reward in gold coins for a supposedly forgotten act of kindness. After receiving anonymous tips from the stranger, nineteen of the town's most prominent couples claim the reward under false pretenses. Their dishonesty becomes evident in a public meeting, and they are publicly shamed. The stranger observes that the townspeople were actually easier than usual to corrupt, because their resolve had never been tested. The town's reputation is further ruined by an unintentional side-effect of the original plan.

== Plot summary ==
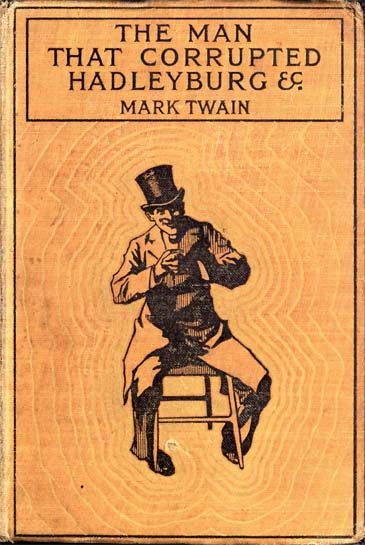
Cover of the Chatto & Windus first edition of The Man That Corrupted Hadleyburg and Other Stories and Sketches (1900)

Chapter I

Hadleyburg enjoys the reputation of being an "incorruptible" town known for its responsible, honest people who are trained to avoid temptation. However, at some point the people of Hadleyburg manage to offend a passing stranger, and he vows to get his revenge by corrupting the town.

The stranger drops off a sack in Hadleyburg, at the house of Edward and Mary Richards. It contains slightly over 160 pounds of gold coins and is to be given to a man in the town who purportedly gave the stranger $20 and some life-changing advice in his time of need years earlier. To identify the man, a letter with the sack suggests that anyone who claims to know what the advice was should write the remark down and submit it to Reverend Burgess, who will open the sack at a public meeting and find the actual remark inside. News of the mysterious sack of gold, whose value is estimated at $40,000, spreads throughout the town and even gains attention across the country.

Chapter II

The residents beam with pride as stories of the sack and Hadleyburg's honesty spread throughout the nation, but the mood soon changes. Initially reluctant to give in to the temptation of the gold, soon even the most upstanding citizens are trying to guess the remark.

Edward and Mary, one of the town's nineteen model couples, receive a letter from a stranger revealing the remark: "You are far from being a bad man: go, and reform." Mary is ecstatic that they will be able to claim the gold. Unbeknownst to one another, all nineteen couples have received identical letters. They submit their claims to Burgess and begin to recklessly purchase things on credit in anticipation of their future wealth.

Chapter III

The townspeople hold a meeting in the town hall to determine the rightful owner of the sack, drawing a large crowd of residents, outsiders, and reporters. Burgess reads the first two claims, and a dispute quickly arises between two townspeople who have submitted nearly the same remark. To settle which is right, Burgess cuts open the sack and finds the note that reveals the full remark: "You are far from being a bad man—go, and reform—or, mark my words—some day, for your sins you will die and go to hell or Hadleyburg—try and make it the former." Neither man's claim includes the entire remark.

The next claim reads the same, and the town hall bursts into laughter at the obvious dishonesty behind the incorrect claims. Burgess continues to read the rest of the claims, all with the same (partial) remark, and one by one the prominent couples of the town are publicly shamed. Edward and Mary await their names with anguish, but are surprised when Burgess does not call on them.

With all the claims presented, another note in the sack is opened. It reveals that the stranger fabricated the entire scenario in order to avenge himself for the offense he suffered while traveling through Hadleyburg. He says that it was foolish for the citizens to always avoid temptation, because it is easy to corrupt those who have never had their resolve tested. Burgess discovers that the sack contains not gold but gilded lead pieces. A townsperson proposes to auction the lead off and give the money to Edward and Mary, the only prominent couple in town whose names were not called. Edward and Mary are in despair, unsure whether to come clean and stop the auction or to accept the money. The stranger who set up the scheme is revealed to have been in the town hall the whole time. He wins the auction, then makes a deal to sell the sack to one of the townspeople for $40,000 and give $10,000 of that money to Edward and Mary. He gives them $1,500 cash at the meeting and promises to deliver the remaining $8,500 the next morning, once his buyer has paid him.

Chapter IV

The following day the stranger delivers checks totaling $38,500 to Edward and Mary - the remainder of the $40,000 selling price. Mary recognizes him as the man who dropped off the sack. As they fret over whether they should burn the checks, they find a note from the stranger explaining that he thought all nineteen model couples would fall to temptation; since Edward and Mary have remained honest, he is giving them all the money. A second message arrives from Burgess, explaining that he intentionally kept the Richardses' claim from being read as a way to return an old favor Edward had done for him. The buyer has the fake gold coins stamped with a message mocking his political rival and distributes them throughout the town, allowing him to win an election for a seat in the state legislature.

Edward and Mary become distraught over their situation, growing paranoid and starting to think Burgess has revealed their dishonesty to other people in the town. Their anxiety causes them both to fall ill, and Edward confesses their guilt shortly before he and Mary die. The checks are never cashed. With its reputation irreparably damaged, Hadleyburg decides to rename itself and remove one word from its official motto (originally "Lead Us Not Into Temptation" to "Lead Us Into Temptation"). The story ends with the comment, "It is an honest town once more, and the man will have to rise early that catches it napping again."

== Adaptations ==
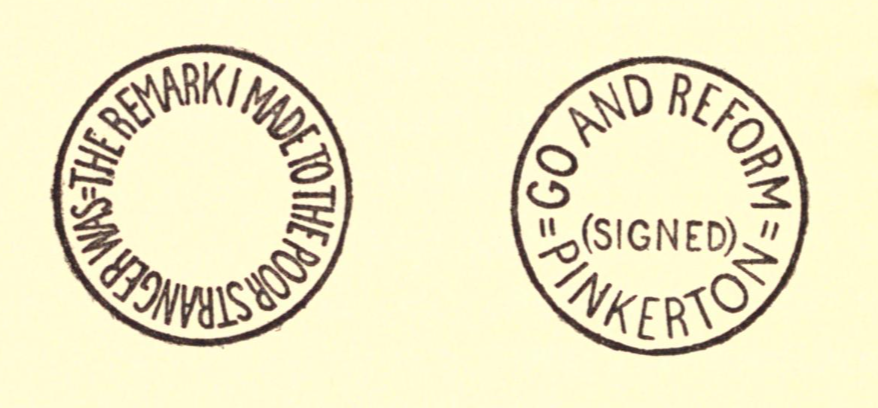
Illustration of the coins distributed at the end of the story, stamped with the book's catchphrase.

In 1967 the story was adapted by Polish Television into a 27-minute television film titled Człowiek, który zdemoralizował Hadleyburg. The film was later incorporated as a self-contained segment into a theatrical movie titled Komedie pomyłek (trans. Comedies of mistakes) shown in cinemas in Poland in 1968.

The story was adapted into a 39-minute television film as part of the PBS American Short Stories series, directed by Ralph Rosenblum and featuring performances by Robert Preston, Fred Gwynne, and Frances Sternhagen. It first aired on March 17, 1980. The ending is both altered and shortened for the film. A DVD version was released by Monterey Media on November 16, 2004.

A radio adaptation of the story was featured on the CBS Radio Mystery Theater on January 9, 1976, starring Fred Gwynne and Earl Hammond.

Another adaptation of the story, featuring the Persky Ridge Players and filmed at a theater in Glasgow, Montana, had a VHS release on October 2, 2000.

The Jiangsu Huai Opera based their opera, entitled The Small Town, on the story. The opera is directed by Lu Ang, written by Xu Xinhua, and stars award-winning actors Chen Mingkuang and Chen Cheng in lead. After a two-year tour of China, the company is set to perform the piece around Europe in 2019.

== Oberlin connection ==
Twain had given a lecture in a church at Oberlin College in 1885, and it was unpopular with the academic audience. The Hadleyburg story may allude to this event. Scholar Russel B. Nye wrote that the story "was Twain's way of taking revenge on the small town" after being jeered at and rejected by the academic audience. Writes Nye, "the story is coexistent with the publication of Twain's tale of exposed hypocrisy, the townspeople remembering his visit and noting the parallel situations. There are some interesting and provocative parallels between Twain's Oberlin experiences and the Hadleyburg of fiction". The town of Oberlin had been founded as a religious and educational settlement in 1833, and is and was known as an educational and religious center. Nye says that Twain read three stories that were received coolly by most of his Oberlin audience: "King Solomon" (an excerpt from Huckleberry Finn, ch. 14); "The Tragic Tale of a Fishwife," an excerpt from A Tramp Abroad; and "A Trying Situation." The fishwife tale is from Appendix D in A Tramp Abroad, subtitled "The Awful German Language."

== Vienna connection ==
Twain lived in Austria from 1897 to 1899. John Sutton Tuckey wrote in Mark Twain and Little Satan that "The Man That Corrupted Hadleyburg" (together with the "Eseldorf" version of The Mysterious Stranger and "Stirring Times in Austria") "all had a common origin in Twain's response to the events of his first two months in Vienna—particularly those that occurred on the floor of the Imperial Parliament". What is meant are parliament obstructions and riots following the adoption of Badeni language laws.
