= Saturday Morning Club =

- Formation: 1871
- Founder: Julia Ward Howe
- Founded at: Boston, Massachusetts
- Type: Woman's club

The Saturday Morning Club, established by Julia Ward Howe in 1871, is an organization for women's community and intellectual growth in Boston, Massachusetts. From the club's inception to the start of World War I, the club hosted prominent speakers, discussed academic subjects, and held theatrical performances. Presently operating out of the Harvard Club of Boston, The Saturday Morning Club is an exclusive organization for members to share written works on academic topics.

== Early years ==
The Saturday Morning Club, organized by Julia Ward Howe (1819–1910) in 1871, was one of the first women's clubs to be founded for young girls. Howe, the author of the "Battle Hymn of the Republic," was a writer of poems, essays, and children's books. She was also an abolitionist, social reformer, and a founding member of the New England Women's Club (1868), one of the first women's clubs in the nation. The idea for the Saturday Morning Club was inspired by Howe's daughter, Maud, who questioned her mother about the conspicuous lack of clubs for young girls. From its beginning, Howe sought a reasonable alternative to the sewing clubs and debutante balls that molded the lives of middle- and upper-class young girls. The club instead offered a broad range of intelligent, useful, and imaginative activities to enrich their lives and occupy their free time. As the Youth's Companion stated in 1910: "The Saturday Morning Club was born of Mrs. Howe's desire that her daughters and their friends should have wider education than the schools offered in 1870. Mrs. Howe chose the fortunate seventy young women, and made them a plan which has proved wonderfully workable through the advancing years". The first meeting of the club was held in Mrs. Howe's home on Thursday, November 2, 1871, at 4 o'clock with only eight young girls present. They voted to form a club which held meetings on Saturday mornings, each alternate Saturday being devoted to a discussion of the previous Saturday's lecture. Katherine C. Pierce, who wrote a history of the club in 1900 remembered the club's naming: "What would they name the club? The first suggestion was 'The Junior Brain Club'. Mrs. Howe did not favor it. The next suggestion was 'The Boston Association for Intellectual Improvement'. This Mrs. Howe turned this down as too pretentious. But, she said, since it was to meet on Saturday mornings, why not call it the 'Saturday Morning Club'? This was adopted, and the Saturday morning club was born". The first club members, which consisted of Maud, her friends, and her schoolmates, held informal meetings at Howe's home on Mt. Auburn Street, in Cambridge, Massachusetts, where they learned to draft a constitution, adopt bylaws, and elect club officers. Nicknamed the "Sat Morn Girls" by Howe, they also created groups to discuss mathematics, science, history, and the arts. By 1874, theatrical projects were added to their weekly meetings and club members were presenting monologues, staging classical plays, and performing musical skits for members and their distinguished guests. Scholarly and intellectual pursuits eventually became the central aspect of club activity. Howe led group discussions to introduce them to critical ways of thinking. As the girls matured and club membership expanded to include older women, they adopted the practice of writing and presenting their own original essays on topics of interest.

=== Constitution ===
From the moment of its founding, the club instituted a strict set of rules and regulations in order to maintain the high standard of the group and their work. The 1874 Constitution, available in the Schlesinger Library Collection at the Radcliffe Institute, contains the following set of rules:

1. The name of this Association shall be the SATURDAY MORNING CLUB.
2. The objects of this Association are to promote Culture and Social Intercourse.
3. The Officers of this Association shall consist of President, two vice-presidents, Secretary, Assistant Secretary, Treasurer, Assistant Treasurer, and Council.
4. The Officers shall be chosen annually, and shall come into office on the first Saturday of January.
5. This Association shall hold twenty-five weekly meetings each year, on Saturday mornings, which shall be alternately Lectures and Discussions, unless otherwise directed by the Officers.
6. There shall be chosen annually, a Lecture Committee of three, and Discussion Committee of three.
7. The Annual Meeting shall be held on the third Saturday in November, and the Officers and Committees for the ensuing year shall then be chosen; a two-thirds majority of the members present being necessary for a choice.
8. The Officers and Council shall form a Board of Direction and executive committee, who shall transact all business of the club.
9. If any Officer except the President resign during the year, the vacancy shall be filled by the executive committee. In case of the President's resignation, they shall order a special election.
10. The Nominating Committee to act at the Annual Meeting, shall be chosen as the last meeting in the spring.
11. The President shall take the chair at meetings of the club, and shall have power to call meetings of the Officers.
12. The Secretary shall send annual notices, with annual and weekly reports of the meetings held by the club, keep a list of the actual and proposed members, and have charge of the property of the club.
13. The Treasurer shall write an annual report, keep record of attendance, file all bills, have charge of all the moneys received and paid by the club, and keep the accounts in such order, as to give a statement of the condition of the funds, whenever the President shall so require.
14. To become a member it is necessary to be proposed by a member, and accepted by the Board of Direction.
15. The Constitution may be amended at any annual or special meetings, by a two-thirds vote of the members present, notice of the intention to amend having been given previously.
16. A quorum shall consist of thirty-five members.
17. By-laws may be amended by a majority of two-thirds, a quorum being present.

This was then followed by a list of 36 by-laws. According to the Youth's Companion, in 1910, "The Club meets each Saturday morning. A survival of its founder's vigorous method is its invariable roll-call, and its fine of five cents for absence and ten cents for tardiness". Katherine C. Pierce, a former club member, described in her written history of the club: "December 27th, 1879, a vote was passed that 'if any member appointed to lead the discussion cannot be present, she shall either send a paper or provide a substitute'. At the two hundred and twenty-fifth meeting it was voted 'that all new members shall take part in one discussion, either actively or by writing a paper, within a year of their admission, or forfeit their membership'. At the three hundred and forty-second meeting March 7, 1885, members were urged to bring suggestions and criticisms to promote the welfare of the club. Miss Noyes then made a motion, and a vote was passed: That six members should be chosen to prepare papers on a given subject one month before that subject was to come up for discussion. These six members are to constitute a committee, one of the six to be appointed chairman. They are to meet during the month one of more times to prepare the discussion. The papers to be read as formerly, and a general discussion opened." Pierce went into great detail regarding how the Constitution of the club was constantly changing to adapt to the welfare of the club, and how closely they adhered to the voted rules. Katherine C. Pierce continued on in her writing, "Growth is essential to prosperity; and we have certainly grown and prospered along the two main lines marked out by our constitution, literary and social. Should the question be asked of any of our Presidents, "what do you consider the most valuable characteristic of the Saturday Morning Club?" I feel sure each one would answer, Its loyalty, or espirit de corps. I wish we had a good Anglo-Saxon word for this essentially Anglo-Saxon virtue. It is a virtue traditional in our club; and to my thinking, it is the best legacy we can leave to future years". The guidance of the Constitution was crucial to the club's success and longevity, according to Pierce and other members.

=== Performances ===
Over time, as the Saturday Morning Club's membership grew steadily, more diverse activities developed. At the January 31, 1874, meeting, Mrs. Howe proposed that the club offer entertainment, both literary and musical. The first of these, held at Mrs. Howe's residence, consisted of vocal and instrumental music, an essay, and a play in two acts, all of which was followed by a "collation" prepared by the cookery group. By 1874, club members were presenting monologues, staging classical plays, and performing musical skits for members and their guests. Members dressed in costume as both men and women and performed successfully in front of numerous large audiences. By the 1890s, the club had more than a hundred members who dedicated much of their time and energy to staging amateur productions of plays such as Antigone, Pride & Prejudice, and The Arabian Nights for audiences of up to 850 people. Of their staging of A Winter's Tale in 1895, The Boston Transcript stated that the club's members performed with "a genuine Shakespearean spirit, and with distinction worthy of the difficult task attempted" The Youth's Companion notes of their performances: "Occasionally the club undertakes some piece of acting. The 'Antigone' of Sophocles, 'The Winter's Tale,' 'In a Balcony' have had remarkable presentations to audiences of women. Once a year the club has a frolic—usually in costume, and enlivened by some witty 'skit' by some clever girl".

=== Lectures ===
As the Centennial Remembrance of the Saturday Morning Club states, the Saturday Morning Club was born out of the larger women's club movement, which "offered to women a new instrument of activity outside the home, for self-improvement and self-education at a time when higher education had not yet opened its doors to women." Julia Ward Howe, "The Queen of the Clubs," wrote of the movement's purpose: "In advising with all women's clubs, I always urged them to include in their programs pressing questions of the day." Lectures were a primary and vital component of the club, rooted in Howe's original educational purpose. The Youth's Companion commented on the lectures: "Every other Saturday the club hears a lecture, and the list of lecturers would be the history of scholarship, philanthropy, and literature for forty years. On the alternate Saturdays the morning is given to a discussion conducted by four club members and participated in by many others. The selection of subjects for the debates was Mrs. Howe's perennial interest...Tendencies in literature, music, art, education, society are all studied. Today the club may have a fervid discussion as to the industrial employment of women, and a fortnight hence they may be equally animated in their advocacy of the classics in education or of Shakespeare for the modern stage". The Centennial Remembrance Report notes that between the first meeting on the club in 1870 and the second, Mrs. Howe was able to line up five lecturers for the coming weeks, due to her acquaintance with the Boston luminaries of her day. Among the first lecturers was Ralph Waldo Emerson. Following his lecture, it was reported in the Boston Post of 1872 that Emerson found the "Sat Morn Girls" to be "the keenest in perception, and the most appreciative of good things, of any audience he ever spoke before, and...he begged the privilege of reading his new papers to them before they were read elsewhere". In addition, Amos Bronson Alcott, Dean of the Concord School of Philosophy lectured on Plato. Lectures of all topics were covered with incredibly notable speakers in attendance. Some of the most prominent thinkers to lecture to the Saturday Morning Club include: Samuel Clemens (Mark Twain; 1882) on "Mental Telegraphy," the lawyer and future Supreme Court Justice Louis B. Brandeis on "Civil Rights of Women" (1883), the African American educator Maria Baldwin on the writings of Harriet Beecher Stowe (1904), and abolitionist William Lloyd Garrison (1905) on the necessity of free speech. A full list of these lectures and their dates is written and recorded in the Saturday Morning Club records at the Schlesinger Library in Cambridge, MA.

== World War I involvement ==
With the onset of the First World War in 1914, the members of the Saturday Morning Club faced a dilemma: did they follow the precedent of the American government and remain neutral in the conflict, or did their intellectual engagement demand further engagement? Inspired by the words of Howe—who died several years earlier, in 1910—the members decided to devote some club activities to the support of the Allied Powers. Though they did not cease during this time, Club activities subsided as members threw their efforts into war service. Some members volunteered in traditional military support efforts, as they raised money, knit, sewed, and ran drives for the Red Cross, The American Fund for French Wounded, and other organizations. Some also took to workrooms to manufacture bandages and other medical supplies. Still other members volunteered in more individualized and specific projects, such as running the Army & Navy Canteen on the Boston Common, staging amateur theatricals to support the Polish Relief Fund, and writing over 200 letters a week to soldiers abroad. One member achieved the rank of Yeoman (F.) in active service with the U.S. Naval Reserve Force's Radio School, and two others facilitated the adoption of orphans from France. Another member was even awarded the Croix de Guerre from the French government for her work nursing and feeding wounded soldiers on the front lines, sometimes under shell fire.

== Post-World War I period ==
The war effort took a serious toll on club membership, which dwindled from its high of 61 members prior to the war. Many women, now more involved in activities outside the club, had little time to participate, while other older members looked to hand over the reins to new leadership. As the club celebrated its 50th anniversary on December 9, 1921, at the Hotel Brunswick in Boston, it faced a critical point of transition in its history. Once an organization primarily for well-bred young women, the club was increasingly in competition with other similar organizations, which cut into their membership. The club's interests were tailoring more towards an older demographic, which altered the dynamic of the club. In short, the Saturday Morning Club had shifted from a "young girl's organization," as the president wrote in 1931, to a "group of older women...valiantly upholding early traditions." In response to these changes, the club concentrated less on consuming other people's expert opinions, and more on discussing and refining their own—a focus which still defines the club's activities today.

== Contemporary Club (1931–present) ==
The Saturday Morning Club continues to meet at the Harvard Club of Boston. The club's season runs from October to April of each year, during which time there are about a dozen club meetings.

=== Purpose ===
The modern-day Saturday Morning Club is a private organization where adult professional women can socialize and discuss intellectual ideas. Each year, a committee of club members chooses a new conceptual topic to guide discussion during that year's meetings. Past topics have included technology, ciphers, and memory. After meeting with the club's president, each member crafts a short research paper, story, memoir, or essay on some aspect of the year's discussion topic. The topic selection committee attempts to choose topics that are broad enough to invite diversity of thought and discussion, but narrow enough to promote a uniform theme for the year. During each club meeting, two members present their essays, papers, stories, or memoirs to the group. Presentations are between twelve and fifteen minutes long. The floor is then opened for questions, feedback, and discussion.

=== Membership ===
An applicant must be sponsored by two current club members and must participate in club activities as a provisional member for two years. After these two years, Club members vote on whether to extend full membership to the provisional member.
