= The Gilded Age: A Tale of Today =

1873 satirical and political novel by Mark Twain and Charles Dudley Warner

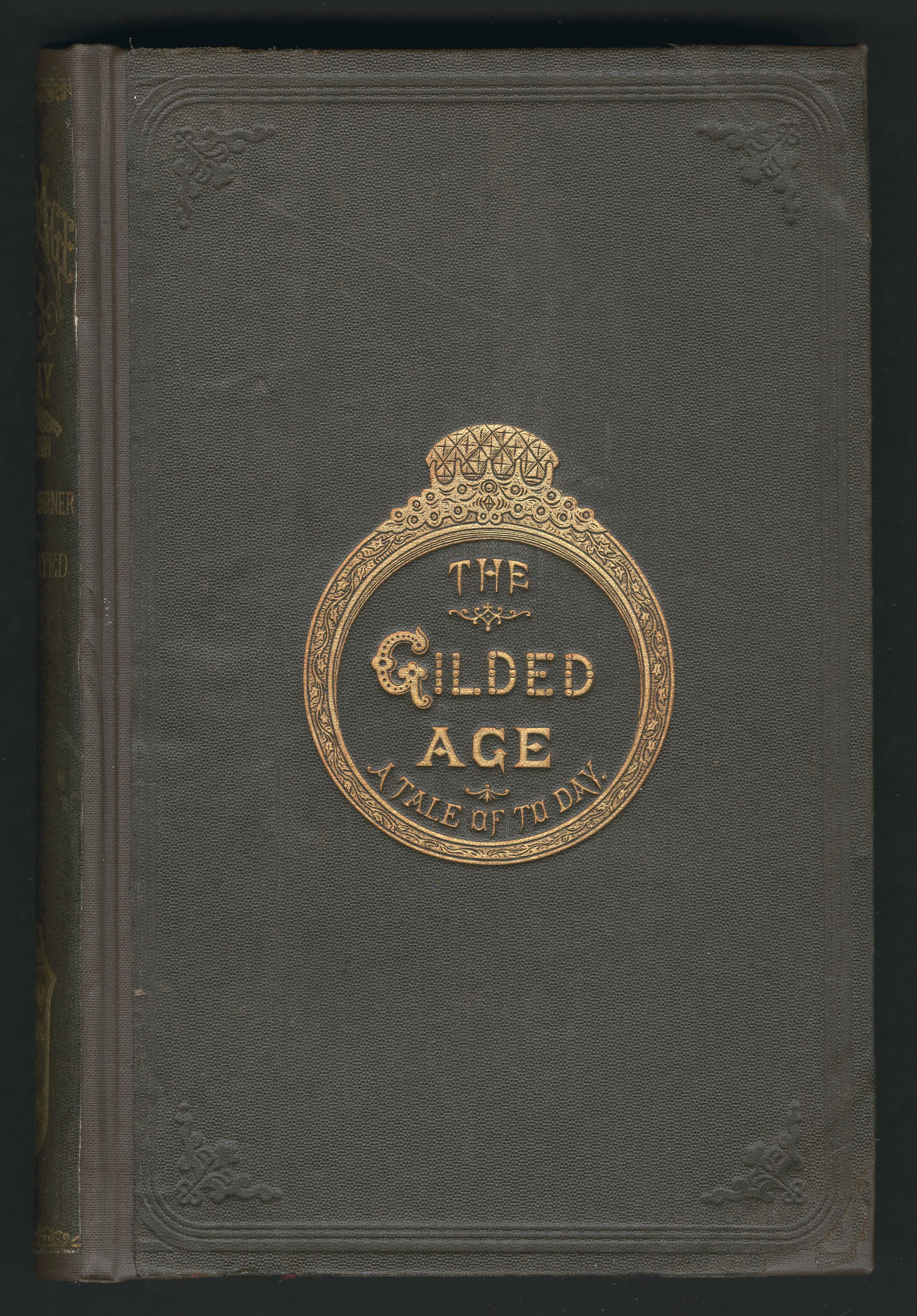
- First edition book cover
- Author: Mark Twain, Charles Dudley Warner
- Language: English
- Genre: Novel, satire, political fiction
- Publisher: American Publishing Company
- Publication date: 1873
- Publication place: United States
- Media type: Print (Hardback)
- Pages: 630

The Gilded Age: A Tale of Today is a satirical and political novel by Mark Twain and Charles Dudley Warner first published in 1873. It satirizes greed and political corruption in post-Civil War America. Although not one of Twain's best-known works, it has appeared in more than 100 editions since its original publication. Twain and Warner had originally planned to issue the novel with illustrations by Thomas Nast.

The book is notable for two reasons as it is the only novel Twain wrote with a collaborator and its title became synonymous with graft, materialism, and corruption in public life. The novel gave the era its nickname: the period of U.S. history from the 1870s to about 1900 is now referred to as the Gilded Age.

== Synopsis ==
The novel concerns the efforts of a poor rural family to become affluent by selling in a timely manner the 75,000 acres (300 km^{2}) of unimproved land acquired by their patriarch, Silas "Si" Hawkins. After several adventures in Tennessee, the family fails to sell the land and Si Hawkins dies. The rest of the Hawkins story line focuses on their beautiful, adopted daughter Laura. In the early 1870s, she travels to Washington, D.C. to become a lobbyist. With a senator's help, she enters society and attempts to persuade congressmen to require the federal government to purchase the land.

A parallel story written by Warner concerns two young upperclass men, Philip Sterling and Henry Brierly, who seek their fortunes in land in a novel way. They make a journey with a group intent on surveying land in Tennessee in order to acquire it for speculation. Philip is good-natured but plodding. He is in love with Ruth Bolton, an aspiring physician and feminist. Henry is a born salesman, charming but superficial.

The Hawkins sections, including several humorous sketches, were written by Twain. Examples are the steamboat race that leads to a wreck (Chapter IV) and Laura's toying with a clerk in a Washington bookstore (Chapter XXXVI). Notable too is the comic presence throughout the book of the eternally optimistic and eternally broke Colonel Beriah Sellers, a Micawber-like character. The character was named Escol Sellers in the first edition and changed to Beriah when an actual George Escol Sellers of Philadelphia objected. A real Beriah Sellers then turned up, causing Twain to use the name Mulberry Sellers in The American Claimant. The Sellers character was modeled after James Lampton, Twain's maternal cousin, and the land-purchase plot parallels Twain's father's purchase of a Tennessee parcel whose prospective sale, Twain wrote in his autobiography "kept us hoping and hoping, during 40 years, and forsook us at last."

The main action of the story takes place in Washington, D.C., and satirizes the greed and corruption of the governing class. Twain also satirizes the social pretensions of the newly rich. Laura's Washington visitors include "Mrs. Patrique Oreille (pronounced O-relay)", the wife of "a wealthy Frenchman from Cork", indicating the O'Reilly family has altered their last name to hide their Irish origins.

In the end, Laura fails to convince Congress to purchase the Hawkins land. She kills her married lover but is found not guilty of the crime, with the help of a sympathetic jury and a clever lawyer. However, after a failed attempt to pursue a career on the lecture circuit, her spirit is broken, and she dies regretting her fall from innocence. Washington Hawkins, the eldest son, who has drifted through life on his father's early promise that he would be "one of the richest men in the world", finally gives up the family's ownership of the still-unimproved land parcel when he cannot afford to pay its $180 of taxes. He also appears ready to overcome his passivity: "The spell is broken, the life-long curse is ended!" Philip, drawing upon his engineering skills, discovers coal on Mr. Bolton's land, wins Ruth Bolton's heart and appears destined to enjoy a prosperous and conventionally happy marriage. Henry and Sellers, presumably, will continue to live daily by their wits while others pay their bills.

== Major themes ==
The theme of the novel is that the lust for getting rich, powerful and famous through land speculation pervades society, illustrated by the Hawkinses as well as Ruth's well-educated father, who nevertheless cannot resist becoming enmeshed in self-evidently dubious money-making schemes.

The book does not touch upon other themes now associated with the "Gilded Age", such as industrialization, monopolies, and the corruption of urban political machines.

== Development history ==
Charles Dudley Warner, a writer and editor, was a neighbor and good friend of Mark Twain in Hartford, Connecticut. According to Twain's biographer, Albert Bigelow Paine, their wives challenged Twain and Warner at dinner to write a better novel than what they were used to reading. Twain wrote the first 11 chapters, followed by 12 chapters written by Warner. Most of the remaining chapters were also written by only one of them, but the concluding chapters were attributed to joint authorship. The entire novel was completed between February and April 1873.

Contemporary critics, while praising its humor and satire, did not consider the collaboration a success because the independent stories written by each author did not mesh well. A review published in 1874 compared the novel to a badly mixed salad dressing, in which "the ingredients are capital, the use of them faulty."

Twain acquired the rights to a stage adaptation of The Gilded Age from G.B. Densmore. He renamed it Colonel Sellers and it was first performed in 1874. John T. Raymond played the title character.

Constance Congdon wrote a 1986 adaptation of The Gilded Age.

== Literary significance and criticism ==
The term Gilded Age, commonly given to the era, comes from the title of this book. Twain and Warner got the name from William Shakespeare's King John (1595): "To gild refined gold, to paint the lily... is wasteful and ridiculous excess" (Act IV, scene 2). Gilding gold, which would be to put gold on top of gold, is excessive and wasteful, characteristics of the age Twain and Warner wrote about in their novel. Another interpretation of the title, of course, is the contrast between an ideal "Golden Age" and a less worthy "Gilded Age", as gilding is only a thin layer of gold over baser metal, so the title now takes on a pejorative meaning as to the novel's time, events and people.

Historian Garry Wills called it America's best political novel, noting that Twain "understood the peculiarly American brand of folly as no one before or after."

Playwright and screenwriter David Mamet, speaking of his book Bambi Meets Godzilla: On the Nature, Purpose and Practice of the Movie Business, used The Gilded Age as a metaphor for Hollywood. On an NPR call-in show, Mamet drew comparisons between the Hawkins family's 40-year quest to win funding for a dam in their hometown and the plight of a young filmmaker trying to sell a script in the unforgiving studio system.

== See also ==
- Mark Twain bibliography
