= Letters from the Earth =

Book of essays by Mark Twain (c. 1909)

- First edition
- Author: Mark Twain
- Language: English
- Publisher: Harper & Row
- Publication date: 1962 (written c. 1909)
- Publication place: United States
- Media type: Print
- Pages: 303

Letters from the Earth is a posthumously published work of American author Mark Twain (1835–1910) edited by Bernard DeVoto. It comprises essays written during a difficult time in Twain's life (1904–1909), when he was deeply in debt and had recently lost his wife and one of his daughters. The content concerns morality and religion and strikes a tone that is sarcastic—Twain's own term throughout the book. Initially, Twain's sole surviving child, Clara Clemens, objected to its publication in March 1939, probably because of its controversial and iconoclastic views on religion, claiming it presented a "distorted" view of her father. Henry Nash Smith helped change her position in 1960. Clara explained her change of heart in 1962 saying that "Mark Twain belonged to the world" and that public opinion had become more tolerant. She was also influenced to release the papers by her annoyance with Soviet reports that her father's ideas were being suppressed in the United States. The papers were selected, edited and sequenced for the book in 1939 by Bernard DeVoto.

== Content ==
Letters from the Earth consists of a series of commentaries in essay and short story form. Many of these pieces express Twain's discomfort with and disdain for Christianity, both as a theological position and a lifestyle. The title story consists of eleven letters written by the archangel Satan to archangels Gabriel and Michael, about his observations on the curious proceedings of earthly life and the nature of Man's religions. Other pieces in the book include a morality tale told as a bedtime discussion with Twain's children, Susy and Clara, about a family of cats, and an essay explaining why an anaconda is morally superior to Man.

== Date of writing ==
Letters from the Earth was written after the deaths of Twain's daughter Suzy (1896) and of his wife Olivia (1904). Textual references make clear that sections, at least, of Letters from the Earth were written shortly before his death in April 1910. (For instance, Letter VII, in discussing the ravages of hookworm, refers to the $1,000,000 gift of John D. Rockefeller Jr. to help eradicate the disease, a gift that was announced on October 28, 1909, less than six months before Twain's death.) However, the following excerpt appears in a discussion of the Palestinian town of Nablous, in The Innocents Abroad. This passage was written more than four decades before his death, in 1867 or 1868 and appears to be an oblique reference to the idea that later became Letters from the Earth:

Carefully preserved among the sacred archives of this curious community is a MSS. copy of the ancient Jewish law, which is said to be the oldest document on earth. It is written on vellum, and is some four or five thousand years old. Nothing but bucksheesh can purchase a sight. Its fame is somewhat dimmed in these latter days, because of the doubts so many authors of Palestine travels have felt themselves privileged to cast upon it. Speaking of this MSS. reminds me that I procured from the high priest of this ancient Samaritan community, at great expense, a secret document of still higher antiquity and far more extraordinary interest, which I propose to publish as soon as I have finished translating it.

Louis J. Budd, editor of Mark Twain: Collected Tales, Sketches, Speeches, and Essays: Volume 2: 1891–1910 (1992), a volume in the Library of America series, places Letters from the Earth sequentially in 1909.

== Dramatic adaptations ==
A stage adaptation of Letters from the Earth by Dan Savage was produced in Seattle in 2003.

== Selected quotations ==
The Creator sat upon the throne, thinking. Behind him stretched the illimitable continent of heaven, steeped in a glory of light and color; before him rose the black night of Space, like a wall. His mighty bulk towered rugged and mountain-like into the zenith, and His divine head blazed there like a distant sun. At His feet stood three colossal figures, diminished to extinction, almost, by contrast—archangels—their heads level with His ankle-bone.

In time, the Deity perceived that death was a mistake; a mistake, in that it was insufficient; insufficient, for the reason that while it was an admirable agent for the inflicting of misery upon the survivor, it allowed the dead person himself to escape from all further persecution in the blessed refuge of the grave. This was not satisfactory. A way must be conceived to pursue the dead beyond the tomb.

Man is a marvelous curiosity. When he is at his very, very best he is a sort of low grade nickel-plated angel; at his worst he is unspeakable, unimaginable; and first and last and all the time he is a sarcasm.

He took a pride in man; man was his finest invention; man was his pet, after the housefly....

(On the Bible) It is full of interest. It has noble poetry in it; and some clever fables; and some blood-drenched history; and some good morals; and a wealth of obscenity; and upwards of a thousand lies.

Letter VIII on "the law of God" expressed by each gender's physical construction:

(women) There shall be no limit put upon your intercourse with the other sex sexually, at any time of life.... During twenty-three days in every month (in absence of pregnancy) from the time a woman is seven years old till she dies of old age, she is ready for action, and competent. As competent as the candlestick is to receive the candle. Competent every day, competent every night. Also she wants that candle—yearns for it, longs for it, hankers after it, as commanded by the law of God in her heart.... her plant has to be out of service three days in the month, and during a part of her pregnancy. These are times of discomfort, often of suffering. For fair and just compensation she has the high privilege of unlimited adultery all the other days of her life (on a 50-year-old man's great-grandmother) as good as new. There is nothing the matter with her plant. Her candlestick is as firm as ever.

(men) During your entire life you shall be under inflexible limits and restrictions, sexually ... man is only briefly competent; and only then in the moderate measure applicable to the word in his sex's case. He is competent from the age of sixteen or seventeen thence-forward for thirty-five years. After fifty his performance is of poor quality, the intervals between are wide, and its satisfactions of no great value to either party ... his candle is increasingly softened and weakened by the weather of age, as the years go by, until at last it can no longer stand, and is mournfully laid to rest in the hope of a blessed resurrection which is never to come.

== See also ==
- The Mysterious Stranger
