= Frederick Strothmann =

American illustrator (1872–1958)

Frederick Strothmann (1872 – 1958) was an American illustrator of magazines and books. He also drew political cartoons and posters.

== Early life ==
Strothmann was born in 1872, in New York City, although some sources say in 1879, in Philadelphia. Little is known about his early life, except that his parents were migrants to the United States from Germany. He studied art at the Carl Hecker School of Art in New York, the Royal Academy in Berlin and in Paris.

== Career ==
By 1900, Strothmann was established as an illustrator, working for The Saturday Evening Post, Collier's, Life, Harper's Magazine, and Good Housekeeping. He also illustrated many books.

Strothmann created a well-known poster for the Liberty Bond drive of 1918, "Beat back the Hun with Liberty Bonds", showing a German soldier with blood on his hands, holding a bayonet and coming over the Atlantic Ocean towards burning ruins, which became an iconic image of the First World War.

Strothmann and his family were living in Manhattan at the time of the censuses of 1910, 1920, 1930, and 1940, and he ended his life living in Flushing, Queens, where he died in 1958.

Strothmann continued to work as an illustrator until 1956. He died in 1958.

== Books illustrated ==
- Mark Twain, The Celebrated Jumping Frog of Calaveras County (1903)
- Mark Twain, Extracts from Adam's Diary (1904)
- Harry Graham, Misrepresentative Men (1904)
- Mark Twain, Editorial Wild Oats (1905)
- Thornton W. Burgess, The Bride's Primer (1905)
- Carolyn Wells, Rubaiyat of a Motor Car (1906)
- Ellis Parker Butler, That Pup (1908)
