= A Murder, a Mystery, and a Marriage =

Short story by Mark Twain

- Author: Mark Twain
- Published: privately 1945, Norton edition 2001
- ISBN: 0393043762

"A Murder, a Mystery, and a Marriage" is a short story written by Mark Twain in 1876. It was published in a very small, unauthorized edition in 1945, with an authorized edition not appearing until 2001.

== Composition and publication history ==
Initially Twain proposed to William Dean Howells that they entice twelve authors, including himself, to each write a short story to the same plot. A similar project was proposed later, resulting in the 1908 collaborative work The Whole Family, though Twain declined the offer to participate. The scheme for "A Murder, a Mystery, and a Marriage" failed, and Twain was the only one to flesh out the plot.

The resulting manuscript remained unpublished until it was purchased by Lew D. Feldman. Feldman held that ownership of the original manuscript gave him the right to publish. To test this theory, in 1945 he brought out a limited edition of 16 copies of the printed story. The case went all the way to the U.S. Court of Appeals before it was determined that "Ownership of a manuscript does not include the right of publication".

It was not until 2001 that publication rights were settled, and the story was finally published in the Atlantic Monthly. This was followed by a book edition by W.W. Norton (ISBN 0393043762).
