= A Dog's Tale =

Short story by Mark Twain

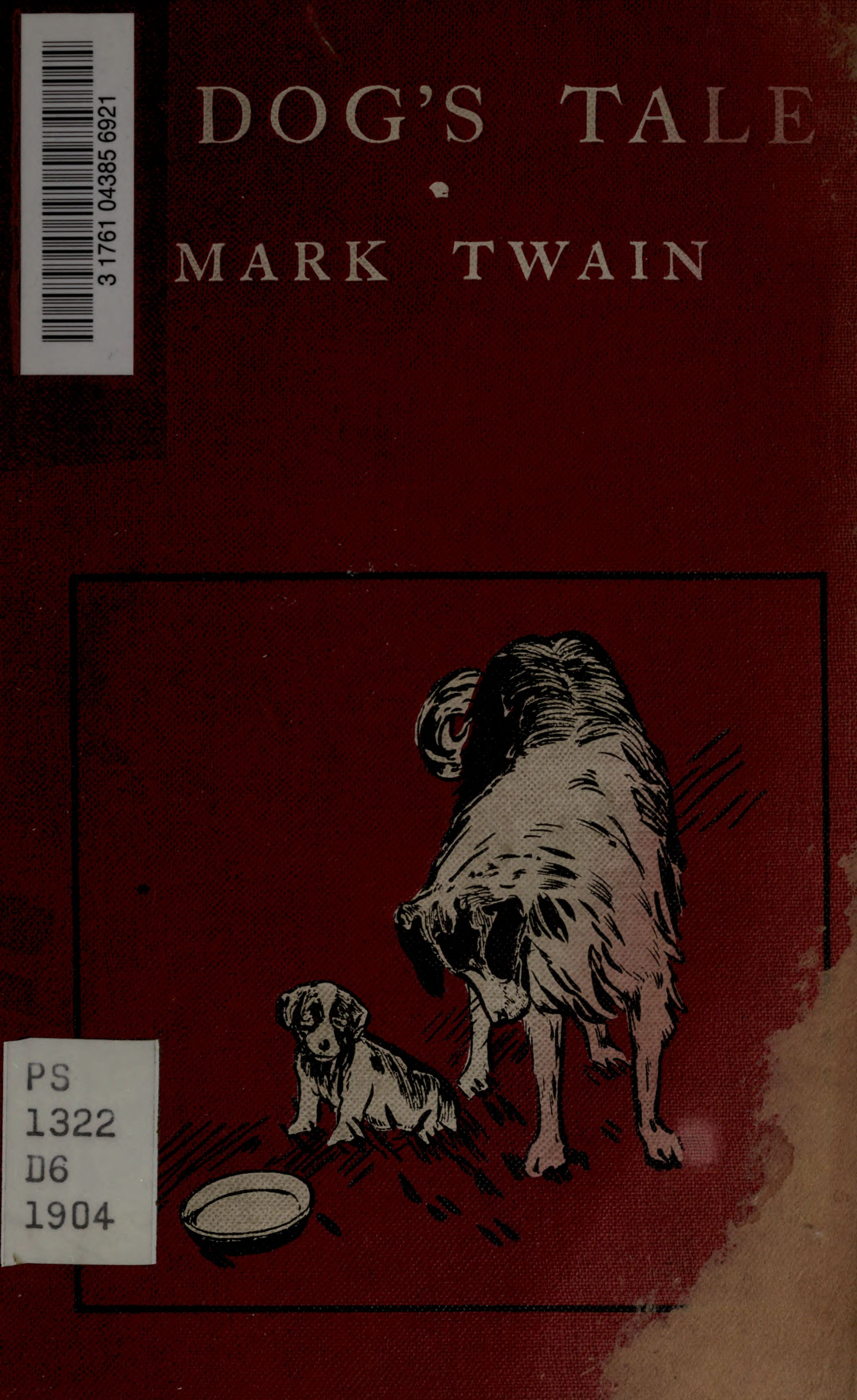
- First edition
- Author: Mark Twain
- Illustrator: W.T. Smedley
- Language: English
- Published: 1904 (Harper & Brothers)
- Publication place: United States
- Media type: Print (Hardback)
- Pages: 55
- Preceded by: Edmund Burke on Croker and Tammany
- Followed by: A Horse's Tale

"A Dog's Tale" is a short story written by Mark Twain. It first appeared in the December 1903 issue of Harper's Magazine. In January of the following year it was extracted into a stand-alone pamphlet published for the National Anti-Vivisection Society. Still later in 1904 it was expanded into a book published by Harper & Brothers.

== Plot ==
The book is told from the standpoint of a poor household pet, a dog self-described by the first sentence of the story: "My father was a St. Bernard, my mother was a collie, but I am a Presbyterian." The story begins with a description of the dog's life as a puppy and her separation from her mother, which to her was inexplicable. Her puppy and her owner's new child were soon added to her new home. When a fire breaks out in the nursery, the dog risks her life to drag the baby to safety. In the process, her motives are misunderstood and she is cruelly beaten by the father of the family with a cane, resulting in her leg getting broken. Soon, however, the truth of the situation is discovered and she receives no end of praise. Later in the story, her puppy dies, killed by the father of the family to prove his opinion on optics to his scientist peers. Only a servant seems to realize the irony of this, exclaiming, "Poor little doggie, you saved HIS child!" In the end, the dog (who does not realize her puppy is dead until her own hour is upon her) pines inconsolable over the grave of the puppy with the clear implication that she will do so until death.
