= Extracts from Adam's Diary =

1893 short story by Mark Twain

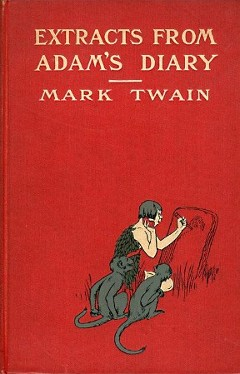
- Front cover of the 1904 first edition published by Harper & Brothers
- Author: Mark Twain
- Illustrator: Frederick Strothmann
- Genre: Humor
- Publisher: Harper & Brothers
- Publication date: 1904
- Publication place: United States
- Media type: Print
- Pages: 89
- OCLC: 187966
- LC Class: PS1309 .A1 1904
- Preceded by: A Dog's Tale
- Followed by: King Leopold's Soliloquy
- Text: Extracts from Adam's Diary at Wikisource

"Extracts from Adam's Diary: Translated from the Original Ms." is a comic short story by the American humorist and writer Mark Twain. The story was first published in The Niagara Book (1893), and was collected in Twain's 1903 book My Debut as a Literary Person with Other Essays and Stories. "Extracts from Adam's Diary" was first published as a book in 1904 by Harper & Brothers, with numerous illustrations by Frederick Strothmann.

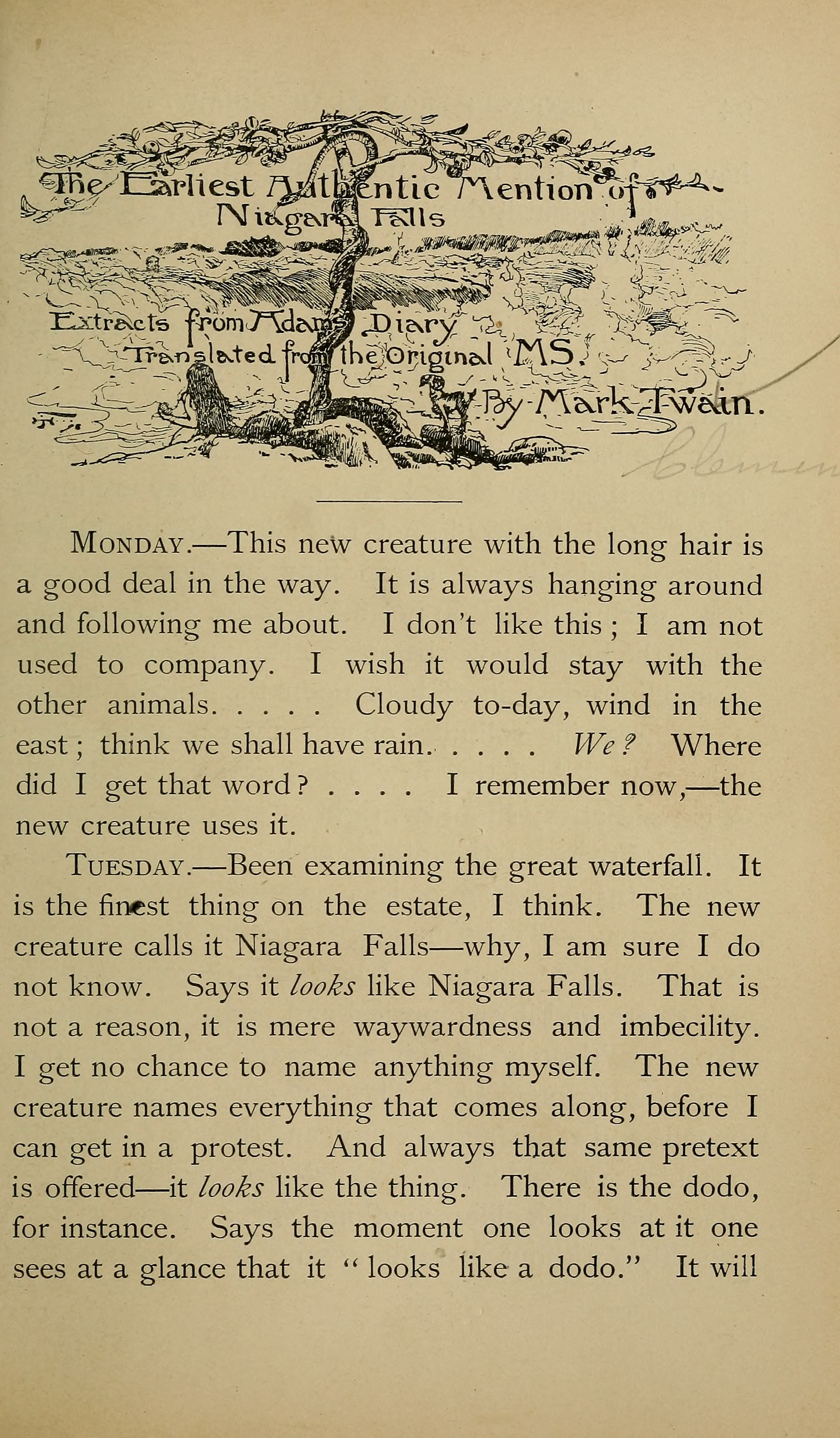
"The Earliest Authentic Mention of Niagara Falls" — First publication in The Niagara Book: A Souvenir of Niagara Falls (1893)

== Plot ==
Adam (based on Twain himself) describes how Eve (modeled after his wife Livy) gets introduced into the Garden of Eden, and how he has to deal with "this new creature with the long hair." The piece gives a humorous account of the Book of Genesis. It begins with the introduction of Eve, described as an annoying creature with a penchant for naming things, which Adam could do without. It moves on to detail Eve eating the apple and finding Cain, a perplexing creature which Adam can not figure out. He devotes his ironically scientific mind to demystifying Cain's species, thinking it a fish, then a kangaroo, then a bear. Eventually he figures out it is a human, like himself.

== Analysis ==
The work is humorous and ironic, and gives a new spin on Genesis: few people have considered what life must have been like for Adam, who is discovering everything anew. The work does not consider God's role at all, and eventually, despite his initial deep annoyance with Eve, Adam finds himself in love with her.

== Publication history ==
- 1893, The Niagara Book. Buffalo : Underhill and Nichols, pp. 93–109.
- 1903, My Debut as a Literary Person with Other Essays and Stories. Hartford, Connecticut: American Publishing Company, pp. 260–275.
- 1904, Extracts from Adam's Diary. New York and London: Harper & Brothers.
