= Edmund Burke on Croker and Tammany =

"Edmund Burke on Croker and Tammany" is an earnest satire by Mark Twain. It was first written for the North American Review, and with their permission was given as a pre-publication address by Twain on October 17, 1901. It was published that same year as a pamphlet under the auspices of a reform committee known as The Order of Acorns. The essay arose from Twain's involvement in a campaign to defeat the Tammany Hall candidate for mayor of New York City. Twain's squib was widely credited with helping to defeat Richard Croker's candidate, Edward M. Shepard.
