= A Horse's Tale =

1906 novel by Mark Twain

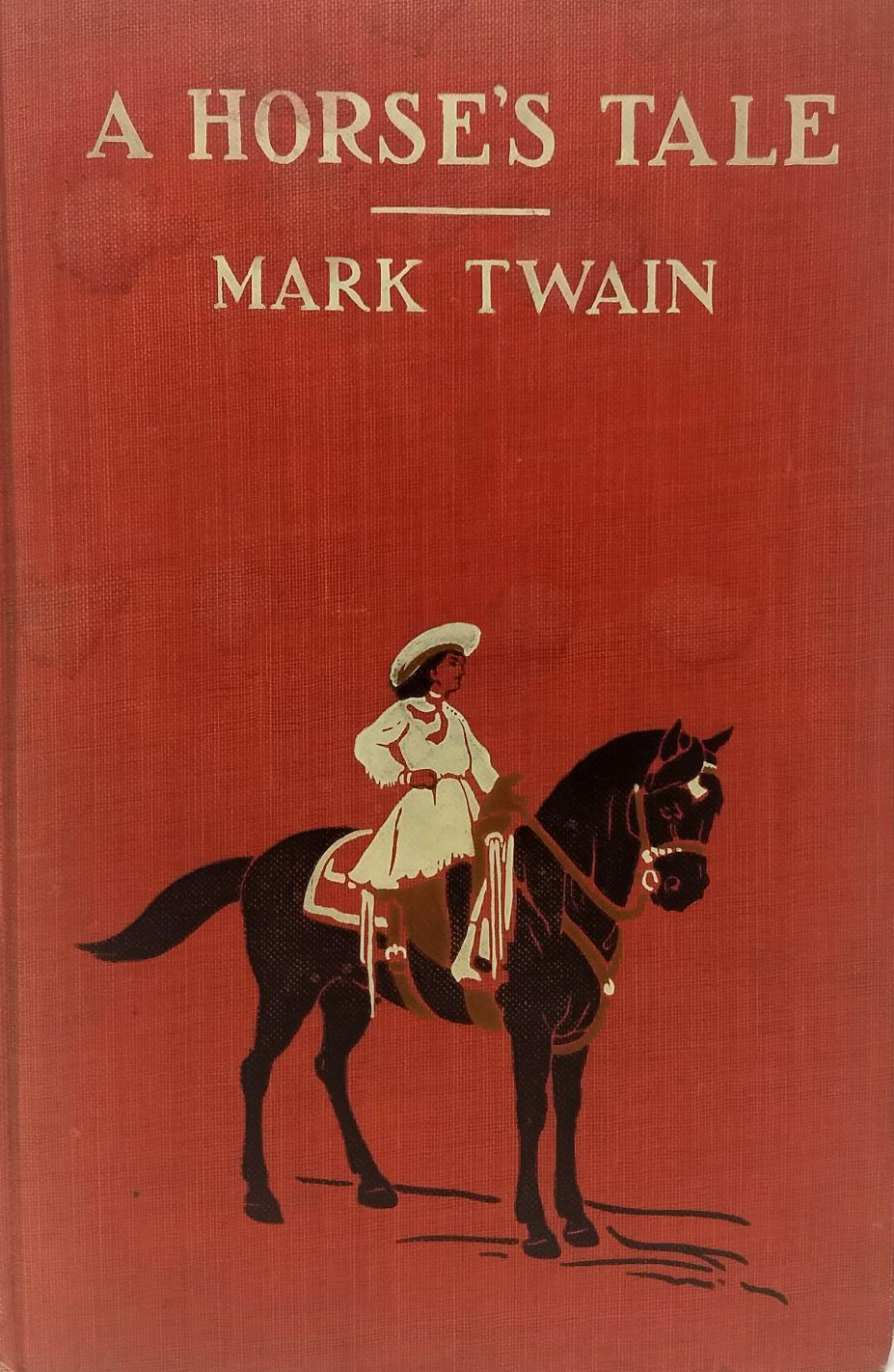
- First edition
- Author: Mark Twain
- Illustrator: Lucius Wolcott Hitchcock
- Language: English
- Publisher: Harper & Brothers
- Publication date: 1907
- Publication place: United States
- Media type: Print (hardback)
- Pages: 153
- OCLC: 262628

A Horse's Tale is a 1907 novel written by American author Mark Twain (Samuel Clemens), written partially in the voice of Soldier Boy, who is Buffalo Bill's favorite horse, at a fictional frontier outpost with the U.S. 7th Cavalry.

== Background ==
Harper's Magazine originally published the story in two installments in August and September 1906. Clemens wrote the story after receiving a request from actress Minnie Maddern Fiske to assist in her drive against bullfighting. Harper's published the story as a 153-page book in October 1907.

Clemens's daughter Susy Clemens, who died in 1896 at age 24 of spinal meningitis, is understood to be the inspiration for lead character Cathy Alison. When Clemens provided the story to Harper's, he included a photograph of Susy for the illustrator to use for Cathy.

== See also ==
- Mark Twain bibliography
