= Mark Twain's Library of Humor =

1888 anthology of short humorous works by Mark Twain

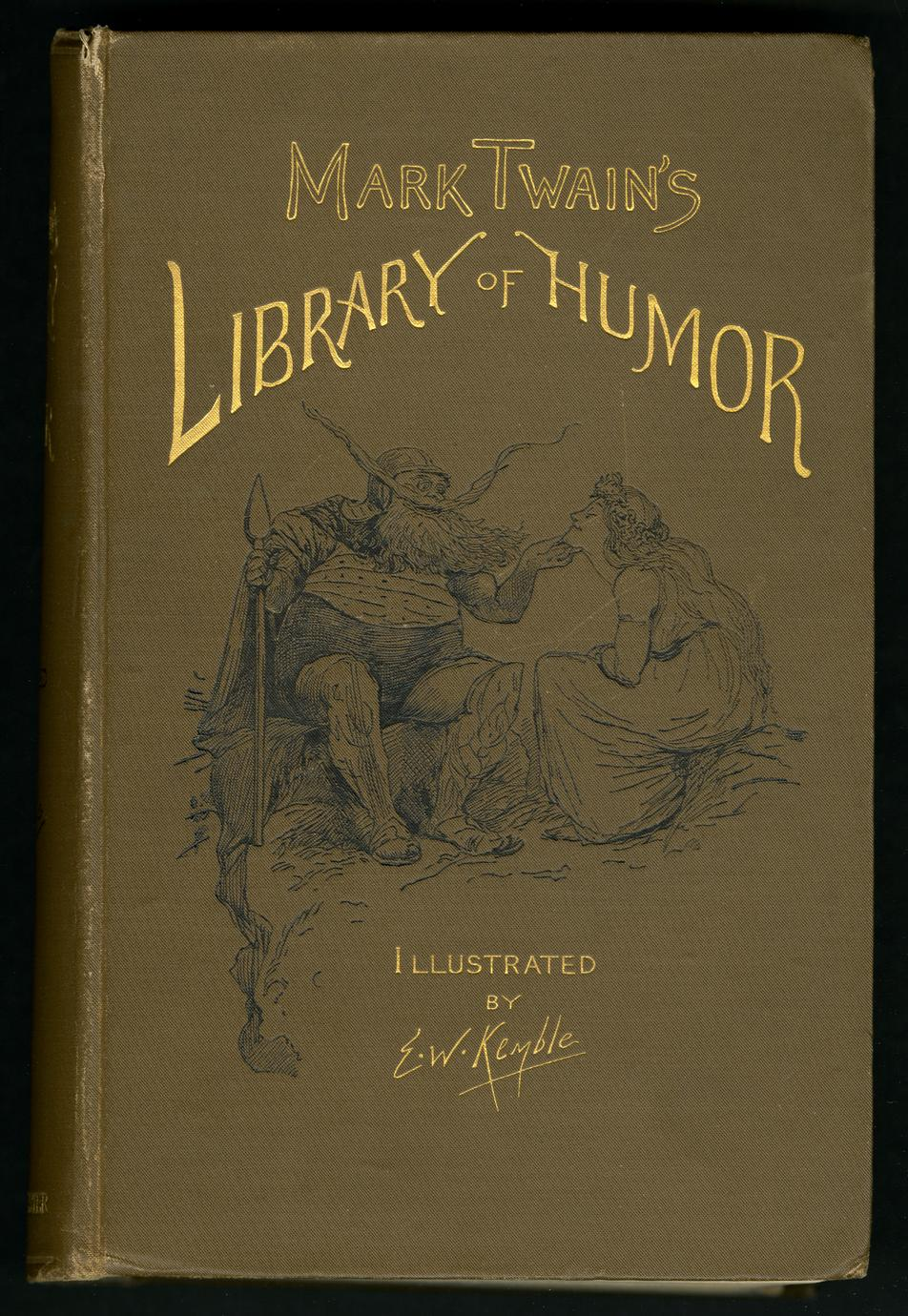
- 1st edition (publ. Charles L. Webster & Co.
- Author: Mark Twain
- Language: English
- Publication date: 1888

Mark Twain's Library of Humor is an 1888 anthology of short humorous works compiled by Mark Twain, pen name of Samuel Langhorne Clemens, William Dean Howells and Charles Hopkins Clark.

In 1880, George Gebbie suggested to Mark Twain that he publish an anthology of humorous works. The idea evolved into a project financed by Clemens to produce an anthology of American humor with himself as editor and Howells and Clark assisting. Clemens did the least work on the project but remained in control and had the final say in everything. He realized how minor his role had been and wanted to put Howells's name on the title page. However, a legal agreement with Harper and Brothers prevented this, stipulating that Howells' name would only appear on their publications. Harper and Brothers wanted US$2,500 (approximately $50,000 with inflation) for a release, compelling Howells to sign the Introduction as "The Associate Editors." The book was published in 1888 by Charles L. Webster & Company. When that firm collapsed in 1894, Harper and Brothers took over the publication of all of Clemens' work. The Library of Humor was a valuable piece, containing many copyrighted works by many distinguished and popular authors. Secretary of Harper and Brothers Frederick A. Duneka had it revamped and expanded by Burges Johnson for a multi-volume revival in 1906. The title and Apology were kept, but the result was wildly different; Clemens's reaction is suggested by the title of Johnson's Fall 1937 article in the Mark Twain Quarterly, "When Mark Twain Cursed Me." One authority has even stated that it should be called The Harper Library of Humor.
