= What Is Man? (Twain essay) =

1906 short story by Mark Twain

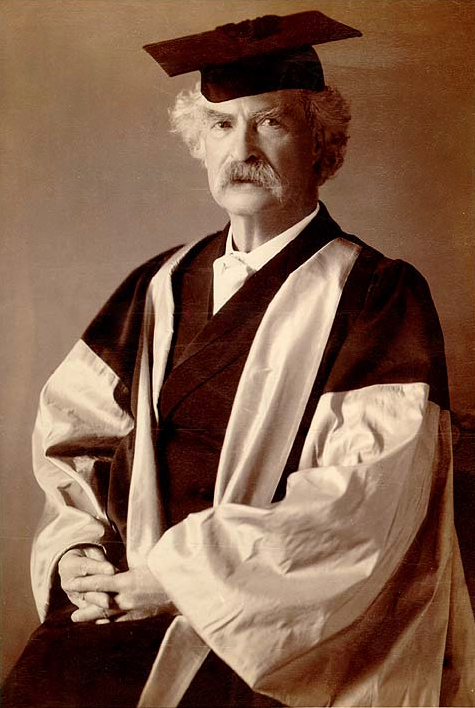
Official portrait of Mark Twain in his DLitt (Doctor of Letters) academic dress, awarded by Oxford University.

"What Is Man?" is a short story by American writer Mark Twain, published in 1906. It is a dialogue between a Young Man and an Old Man regarding the nature of man. The title refers to Psalm 8:4, which begins "what is man, that you are mindful of him...".

It involves ideas of determinism and free will, as well as of psychological egoism. The Old Man asserts that the human being is merely a machine, and nothing more, driven by the singular purpose to satisfy his own desires and achieve peace of mind. The Young Man objects and asks him to go into particulars and furnish his reasons for his position.

The work appears to be a genuine and earnest debate of his opinions about human nature, rather than satirical. Twain held views similar to that of the Old Man prior to writing "What is Man?". However, he seems to have varied in his opinions of human freedom.

It was published anonymously in 1906 and received such little attention Twain claimed to have regretted its publication. After his death in 1910, the New-York Tribune published a feature on it. Criticism at that time focused on its dark and anti-religious nature.
