= The Mysterious Stranger =

Unfinished novella by Mark Twain

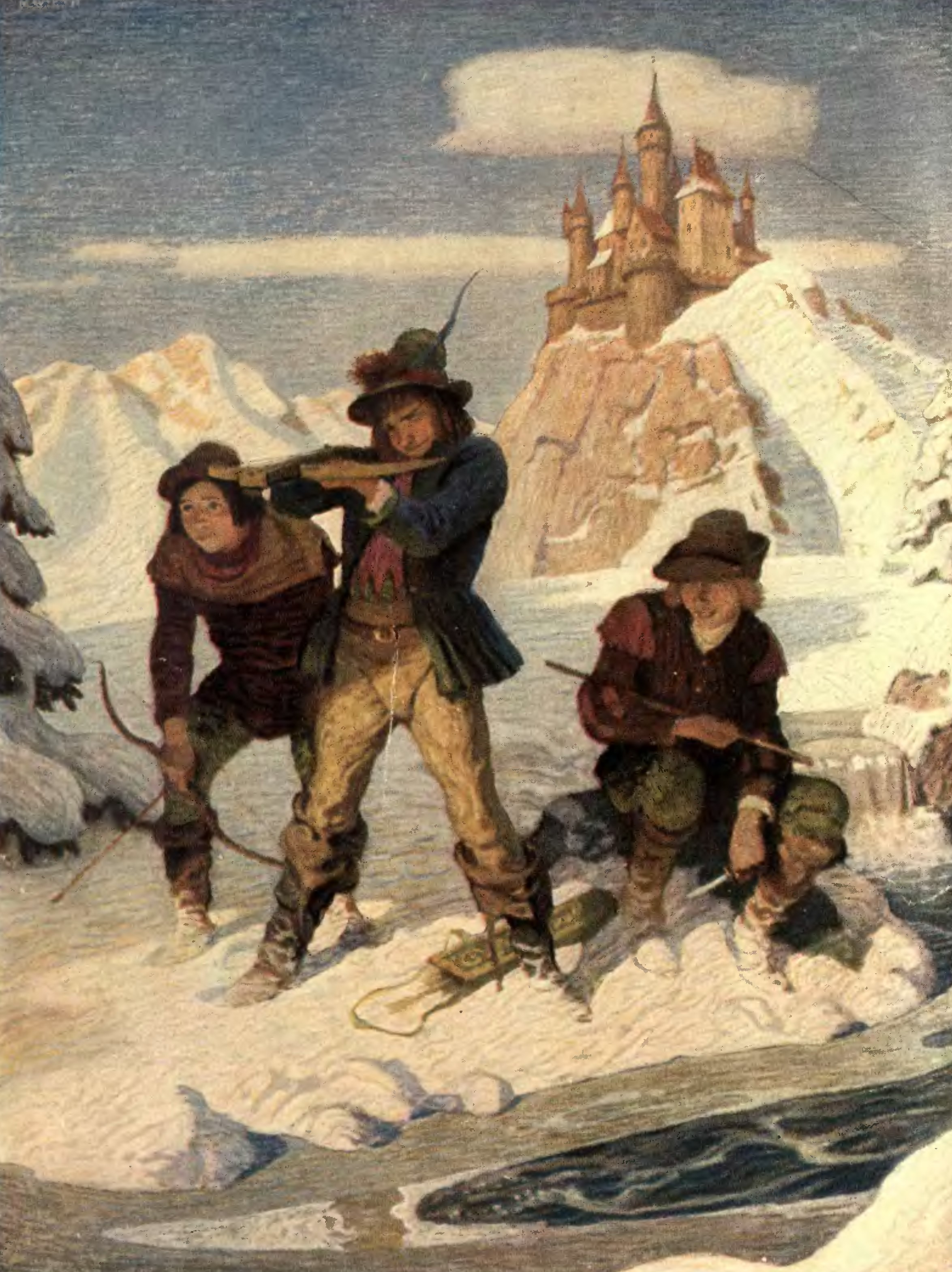
- Frontispiece of the 1st edition: "Eseldorf was a paradise for us boys"
- Author: Mark Twain
- Illustrator: N. C. Wyeth
- Language: English
- Publisher: Harper & Brothers
- Publication date: 1916, posthumously
- Publication place: New York City, New York, United States
- Media type: Hardcover
- Pages: 176

The Mysterious Stranger is a novella by the American author Mark Twain. He worked on it intermittently from 1897 through 1908. Twain wrote multiple versions of the story; each involves a supernatural character called "Satan" or "No. 44", encountering children. In one version, the children are Huckleberry Finn and Tom Sawyer.

== Versions ==
The three stories differ in length: The Chronicle of Young Satan has about 55,000 words, Schoolhouse Hill 15,300 words and No. 44, the Mysterious Stranger 65,000 words.

=== "St. Petersburg Fragment" ===
Mark Twain wrote the "St. Petersburg Fragment" in September 1897. It was set in the fictional town of St. Petersburg, a name Twain often used for Hannibal, Missouri. Twain then revised this version, removing references to St. Petersburg, and used the text for The Chronicle of Young Satan.

=== The Chronicle of Young Satan ===
The first substantial version is entitled The Chronicle of Young Satan (also referred to as the "Eseldorf" version) and relates the adventures of Satan, the sinless nephew of the biblical Satan, in Eseldorf, a village in Austria, in the year 1702. Twain wrote this version between November 1897 and September 1900. "Eseldorf" is German for "Assville" or "Donkeytown".

=== Schoolhouse Hill ===
The second substantial text Twain attempted to write is known as Schoolhouse Hill or the "Hannibal" version. It is set in the U.S., and concerns the adventures of the familiar characters Huckleberry Finn and Tom Sawyer with Satan, referred to in this version as "No. 44, New Series 864962". Twain began writing it in November 1898 and, like the "St. Petersburg Fragment", set it in the fictional town of St. Petersburg.

=== No. 44, the Mysterious Stranger ===
The third text, called No. 44, the Mysterious Stranger: Being an Ancient Tale Found in a Jug and Freely Translated from the Jug, also known as the "Print Shop" version, returns to Austria, this time in the year 1490, not long after the invention of printing. It tells of No. 44's mysterious appearance at the door of a print shop and his use of heavenly powers to expose the futility of mankind's existence. This version also introduces an idea that Twain was toying with at the end of his life, involving a duality of the "self", composed of the "Waking Self" and the "Dream Self". Twain explores these ideas through the use of "Duplicates", copies of the printshop workers made by No. 44. This version contains an actual ending, but the text still has many flaws and it is debatable whether it can be considered finished. Twain wrote this version between 1902 and 1908.

== Paine-Duneka text of 1916 ==
The edition published in 1916 (in seven parts in Harper's Magazine, and separately as a book published by Harper & Brothers) is composed mainly of a heavily edited Chronicle of Young Satan, with a slightly altered version of the ending from No. 44 tacked on. Albert Bigelow Paine, who had sole possession of Twain's unfinished works after Twain's death and kept them private, claimed that he had searched through Twain's manuscripts and had found the proper intended ending for The Mysterious Stranger. After Paine's death in 1937, Bernard DeVoto became the possessor of Twain's manuscripts and released them to the public. In the 1960s, critics studied the original copies of the story and found that the ending Paine chose for The Mysterious Stranger referred to the characters from different versions of the story (such as No. 44 instead of Satan) and the original names had been crossed out and written over in Paine's handwriting.

In 1963, scholars led by researcher John S. Tuckey carefully examined Twain's papers and manuscripts and discovered that Paine had not only tampered with and patched together three previously unfinished manuscripts but also had with assistance from Frederick Duneka added passages not written by Twain in order to complete The Mysterious Stranger. The book version that was published nonetheless maintains Twain's criticisms of what he believed to be the hypocrisy of conventional religion.

According to editor W. M. Gibson, Paine's volume was a literary fraud that went undetected for more than 40 years. Nevertheless, Gibson also admits that "the cut, cobbled-together, partially falsified text has the power to move and to satisfy esthetically despite its flaws."

=== Summary ===
In 1590, three boys, Theodor, Seppi, and Nikolaus, live relatively happy simple lives in a remote Austrian village called Eseldorf (German for "Assville" or "Donkeytown"). The story is narrated by Theodor, the village organist's son. Other local characters include Father Peter, his niece Marget, and the astrologer.

One day, a handsome teenage boy named Satan appears in the village. He explains that he is an angel and the nephew of the fallen angel whose name he shares. Young Satan performs several magical feats. He claims to be able to foresee the future and informs the group of unfortunate events that will soon befall those they care about. The boys do not believe Satan's claims until one of his predictions comes true. Satan proceeds to describe further tragedies that will befall their friends. The boys beg Satan to intercede. Satan agrees but operates under the technical definition of mercy. For instance, instead of a lingering death due to illness, Satan simply causes one of Theodor's friends to die immediately.

In the village and in other places around the world where Satan transports them magically, the boys witness religious fanaticism, witch trials, burnings, hangings, deaths and mass hysteria. Finally, Satan vanishes after explaining:

Strange, indeed, that you should not have suspected that your universe and its contents were only dreams, visions, fiction! Strange, because they are so frankly and hysterically insane—like all dreams: a God who could make good children as easily as bad, yet preferred to make bad ones; who could have made every one of them happy, yet never made a single happy one; who made them prize their bitter life, yet stingily cut it short; who gave his angels eternal happiness unearned, yet required his other children to earn it; who gave his angels painless lives, yet cursed his other children with biting miseries and maladies of mind and body; who mouths justice and invented hell—mouths mercy and invented hell—mouths Golden Rules, and forgiveness multiplied by seventy times seven, and invented hell; who mouths morals to other people and has none himself; who frowns upon crimes, yet commits them all; who created man without invitation, then tries to shuffle the responsibility for man's acts upon man, instead of honorably placing it where it belongs, upon himself; and finally, with altogether divine obtuseness, invites this poor, abused slave to worship him!... [T]here is no God, no universe, no human race, no earthly life, no heaven, no hell. It is all a dream—a grotesque and foolish dream. Nothing exists but you. And you are but a thought—a vagrant thought, a useless thought, a homeless thought, wandering forlorn among the empty eternities!

== University of California Press editions ==
In 1969, the University of California Press published, as part of The Mark Twain Papers Series, a scholarly edition of all three unaltered manuscripts, edited by William M. Gibson and titled Mark Twain's Mysterious Stranger Manuscripts; it was republished in 2005. The same publisher released a final version of No. 44, The Mysterious Stranger in a popular edition in 1982.

== Adaptations ==
=== Film versions ===
In 1982, a film version of No. 44, The Mysterious Stranger was shot by The Great Amwell Company and shown in the United States on PBS, and later on HBO and was directed by Peter H. Hunt. The role of 44 was played by Lance Kerwin, and August was played by Chris Makepeace.

A scene from The Chronicle of Young Satan was adapted in the 1985 claymation film The Adventures of Mark Twain, wherein Satan invites Tom Sawyer, Huck Finn, and Becky Thatcher to his company, displaying his powers to manifest things at will. He invites them to construct small clay people, which he brings to life and places in a small kingdom. Satan expresses curiosity and eventually spite toward their creations when the clay people display infighting and inflict cruelty on one another. He causes plagues and natural disasters to destroy the small community, buries the ruins with an earthquake, and causes wild vegetation to engulf the spot where the clay people once lived, demonstrating the futility and insignificance of mankind—much to the horror of the children, with Huck Finn uttering "You murdered them!" Satan advises them that "people are of no value" and that more could be made "if we need them". The scene also quotes Satan's last line from the book. In this version, Satan appears playful and friendly when he constructs the small kingdom, slowly revealing himself as cruel and hateful as he destroys it (although he claims he "can do no wrong" since he does not understand the word's meaning). He appears as a robed, headless figure with a mask where his head would be. As his true nature is revealed, the mask gradually changes from a pleasant appearance to a demonic visage and finally a grinning skull. The film also gives a paraphrased line from No. 44, The Mysterious Stranger to Mark Twain as his parting remark to the children: The human race in all its poverty has only one truly effective weapon: Laughter. Against the assault of laughter nothing can stand.

In 1989, a film adaptation of this book was shot in the Soviet Union by Igor Maslennikov and released under the title Filipp Traum. Philipp Traum is the name Satan comes to use amongst humans, traum being the German word for "dream".

The 2019 acid western movie Day of the Stranger is a loose adaptation of the story in a western setting.

=== Opera ===
Kevin Malone's opera Mysterious 44 is inspired by the work. The premiere, performed by Manchester Opera Project with a narrated introduction and conclusion by evolutionary biologist Richard Dawkins, was at the residence of the Hallé Orchestra at St Peter's Church, Ancoats, Manchester, on 24 May 2014.

=== Pop culture ===
Artist Ted Richards drew a comic-strip adaptation of "The Mysterious Stranger" for his "Dopin' Dan" character in "Rip-Off Comix No. 1" (Rip-Off Press, San Francisco, 1977).

The story of The Mysterious Stranger is loosely adapted for a side quest in the 2010 video game Red Dead Redemption and its 2018 prequel, with a similar character who sends the protagonist John Marston on various morality-based quests.

A character called The Mysterious Stranger whose signature weapon is a .44 Magnum appears throughout the Fallout series of games released by Bethesda Softworks. While the character has consistently sported a trench coat and fedora hat, their true nature and origins remain unexplained. A running theme is that the stranger appears at random times to aid the player character, and then disappears.

== See also ==
- Mark Twain bibliography
