= Chapters from My Autobiography =

Autobiographical stories by Mark Twain

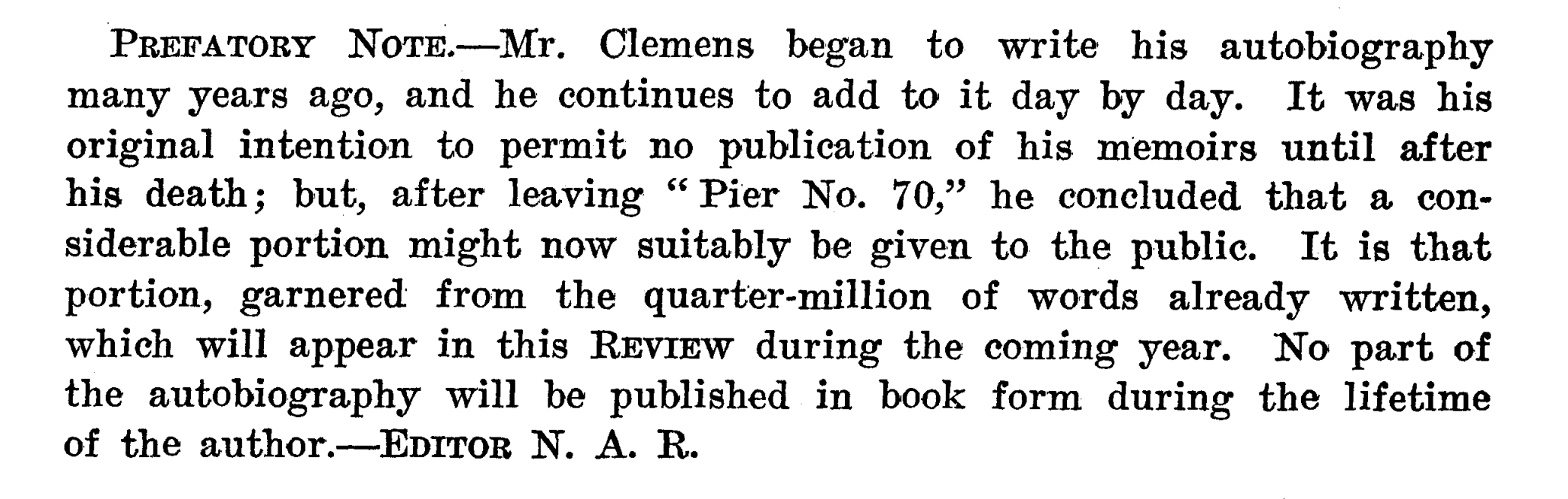
Prefatory note to the Chapters in the North American Review

Chapters from My Autobiography are 25 pieces of autobiographical work published by American author Mark Twain in the North American Review between September 1906 and December 1907. Rather than following the standard form of an autobiography, they comprise a rambling collection of anecdotes and ruminations. Much of the text was dictated.

These chapters comprise only a fraction of the autobiographical work written by Twain. Other material, which was unpublished and in a disorganised state at the time of Twain's death in 1910, was progressively collated and published over the next 100 years in various forms.

== Chapters ==
=== Chapter 1 ===
Chapter 1 appeared in the September 7, 1906 issue of the North American Review. Twain tells his readers that his autobiography won't be about “showy episodes” in his life, but rather about common experiences from the life of an average person. Then he writes about a conversation he has with American author and lifelong friend, William Dean Howells, and tells him that this autobiography will help set the standard for future autobiographies and will still be read for thousands of years to come. Howells agrees with him that this work will indeed be that revolutionary. Then he goes on to talk about how his family grew up in Jamestown.

=== Chapter 2 ===
Chapter 2 appeared in the September 21, 1906 issue of the North American Review. This Chapter focuses mostly on Twain's first experiences as an author, which started in 1867, when Charles H. Webb, editor and reporter, suggested that he published a volume of sketches. He knew him through the story called “The Celebrated Jumping Frog of Calaveras County,” which was published in The Saturday Press, and later copied in newspapers in America and England. However, even though people knew this story, Twain was not famous yet. After Carleton refused to publish Twain's work, the sketches ended up being published by Webb himself. In 1868, Elisha Bliss, from the American Publishing Company of Hartford, asked Twain to publish a book recounting the Quaker City Excursion he just went on. The company did not publish it right away because they thought that it might have an impact on the house's reputation. Twain insisted, and they ended up publishing it in 1869, which, according to Bliss, took the publishing house out of debt. When he was fourteen years old, Twain's sister had a party at their house, and was supposed to dress up as a bear in order to perform in a small play. He went to change in a room, and practiced his role, not knowing that there were two girls in that room, who saw him. When he understood what happened, he was ashamed. He never knew who the girls were, and after this event, he suspected all the girls he knew.

=== Chapter 3 ===
Chapter 3 appeared in the October 5, 1906 issue of the North American Review. This chapter focuses on two of the most important women in the author's life: his wife Olivia, and one of his three daughters: Susy. Twain begins this chapter by reminiscing on his deceased wife: he is writing the day before their thirty-sixth anniversary. The first two pages of this chapter can be considered as a eulogy of Twain's wife. He then draws a parallel between her death and that of his daughter Susy who succumbed to meningitis at age 24. A significant detail about her death is that her last word was “Mamma.” Twain relies on the bond which existed between his wife and his daughter to write an even longer (eight pages) eulogy of his Susy, emphasizing her intelligence and quick thinking even as young child, and her having inherited her mother's positive qualities (thoughtfulness, altruism, maturity, honesty). He almost apologizes for only wanting to focus on the positive aspects of her life. Very interestingly, Twain's other children Langdon, Clara, and Jean are only mentioned for context, and Twain does not give the reader many details about himself. Therefore, this chapter is mostly a biography of his deceased wife and daughter.

=== Chapter 4 ===
Chapter 4 appeared in the October 19, 1906 issue of the North American Review. This chapter begins with Twain remarking on how honored he felt when his daughter Susy started compiling a biography of him. He then begins explaining some of the entries from it, saying that he will not be making any alternations to her text in order to maintain its purity. He details how reviewers often misjudged him during this time (specifically accusations of plagiarism and comments against his physical appearance). Susy chooses to spend part of her biography defending him against these criticisms. Twain then goes on to explain how Susy captured his temper. She does this specifically by describing a situation in which Twain becomes frustrated and sarcastic about the security system in his home never working efficiently. Other stories are summarized, such as Twain's ability to tell a story based on images/paintings in their home, as well as tales of Twain's interactions with their peculiarly named cats (Satan and Sin). Twain ends the chapter by again praising Susy's honesty, saying about her, “This is a frank historian.” He seems generally delighted and flattered throughout the chapter that his daughter chose to become his biographer at such a young age as 15.

=== Chapter 5 ===
Chapter 5 appeared in the November 2, 1906 issue of the North American Review. This chapter provides some context about Twain's siblings: Orion, Margaret, Pamela, Benjamin, and Henry. Margaret and Benjamin both died young. Twain then goes on to tell a lot of Orion's life story, mainly dealing with his internal struggles. He was a very eager man, but he also suffered from “deep glooms.” He was also very indecisive in what sort of career he wanted. He attempted to learn the printer's trade, how to be a lawyer, and how to be an orator. His indecisiveness carried into his religion and politics as well. It's mentioned several times throughout the chapter that although he was indecisive, he was always sincere, truthful and honest. He had an incredible drive to please others. After his father's death, he returned home to help support his mother and youngest brother, Henry. Twain then moves into a brief description of his apprenticeship during this time, describing its benefits along with his relationship with his boss and his fellow apprentices.

=== Chapter 6 ===
Chapter 6 appeared in the November 16, 1906 issue of the North American Review.

=== Chapter 7 ===
Chapter 7 appeared in the December 7, 1906 issue of the North American Review.

=== Chapter 8 ===
Chapter 8 appeared in the December 21, 1906 issue of the North American Review.

In this chapter, Mark Twain describes living and working in Nevada as the City Editor for Mr. Goodman's Virginia City Enterprise. He was 29 years old at the time. Dueling was in fashion, and several of his coworkers at the paper got involved and encouraged him to as well, which he eventually did while working on an editorial for Shakespeare's birthday in 1864. Another editor, Mr. Laird the for the Virginia City Union, working on a similar editorial. Issuing a challenge for a duel in traditional fashion, the men met to duel, but did not go through with it. Shortly after Twain's failed attempt at a duel, a new law was passed that carried a two-year jail sentence with dueling. Since Twain had engaged in challenging someone to a duel on several occasions, he fled the territory and did not engage in dueling activities again.

=== Chapter 9 ===
Chapter 9 appeared in the January 4, 1907 issue of the North American Review. This chapter centers on Twain's ideas about how humans are designed for monarchical rule over democracy. He discusses how “the human race was always intended to be governed by kingship, not by popular vote” due to people's inclination toward power. To get this idea across, he tells the story of how he pretended to be hypnotized by a “mesmerizer,” a hypnotist referred to as Hicks, who visited his hometown when he was fifteen. He eventually became the only participant in his show because of his convincing performance, even though his hypnosis was only an act. He started to crave the attention he received, and he wanted the crowd to favor him over Hicks. Thirty-five years after the fact, he decided to tell his mother that it was a lie. To his surprise she said, “You were only a child then, and could not have done it.” He admitted to his faults, but his mother refused to believe that it was true.

=== Chapter 10 ===
Chapter 10 appeared in the January 18, 1907 issue of the North American Review. This chapter discusses Orion Clemens (born July 17, 1825 in Jamestown, Tennessee), who was Twain's eldest brother, antedating him by ten years. After a series of moves, he and his family found themselves living in Hannibal, Missouri, when he was twelve years old. At the age of fifteen, Orion had moved to St. Louis to learn the printing trade. During his apprenticeship, Orion would become good friends with Edward Bates, who later served in President Lincoln’s first cabinet. During his time in St. Louis, Orion was known to change his ventures to match his ever-changing interests. He would set out to be a lawyer one week, and next an orator. Despite his constant change of interest and desire, Orion would always put forth his best effort and maximum concentration, even if the interest changed after a week’s time.

=== Chapter 11 ===
Chapter 11 appeared in the February 1, 1907 issue of the North American Review.

=== Chapter 12 ===
Chapter 12 appeared in the February 15, 1907 issue of the North American Review.

=== Chapter 13 ===
Chapter 13 appeared in the March 1, 1907 issue of the North American Review. Twain touches on his youth but focuses mainly on the summers he spent on his uncle’s farm a couple miles outside of Florida, Missouri, the town of his birth. The summers he spent here from about ages 6-13 were highly influential on his writing and his development as a person. It is here that he was exposed to the African American slave life, which affected him deeply. A slave, "Unc'l Daniel," had the most impact, serving as an inspiration for the character Jim in the Adventures of Huckleberry Finn, and shaping his view of African Americans. He states: “It was on the farm that I got my strong liking for his race and my appreciation of certain of its fine qualities.” This farm was the model for the farm used in Huck Finn. In the town of Florida, he would also draw inspiration from people he met, developing them into characters such as General and Injun Joe.

=== Chapter 14 ===
Chapter 14 appeared in the March 15, 1907 issue of the North American Review. This chapter begins with an excerpt from Susy's biography of him in which she talks about how her sister Clara was always opposite from her. Clara always seemed to be braver than she was as she would stand perfectly still when having a sliver of wood removed from her finger while Susy would be very cowardly. Twain remarks on how Susy had a knack for remembering things very accurately. He then goes on to exclaim his pride in Clara's saying that she was brave, but nobody was braver than God. He was proud that Clara was becoming a great thinker and observer. Twain then moves into a long story about how his family once moved to Berlin, Germany, where he was invited to a dinner with Emperor Wilhelm II. Before going to the party, Twain became friends with one of the officials at the Foreign Office who he would call Smith. Smith was tired of having to work all the time and was considering resigning without getting a vacation. In the end during the party, Smith got his vacation and Twain was honored by the Kaiser, who praised "Old Times on the Mississippi". Twain then explains that he had broken the unspoken law in Germany that if someone entered a house after ten, they must pay a toll to the doorman for waking him. In the later entries Twain would reflect back on the imperial dinner with the Kaiser.

=== Chapter 15 ===
Chapter 15 appeared in the April 5, 1907 issue of the North American Review. This chapter begins with Twain describing his experience renting kittens for the summer time. He relates the three kittens he had at the time to the people around him. Twain claims that conformity is inevitable within most living creatures, especially in man: “They are afraid to be outside; whatever the fashion happens to be, they conform to it.” Twain then describes his innate desire to stand out in a conforming world. He mentions his old age briefly and ponders the thought that this quality could in fact benefit his hope to express himself freely, specifically through the act of potentially wearing a colorful wardrobe in the dead of winter. “We all conform to the prevailing insanity,” he writes, “and go about in dreary black, each man doing it because the others do it.” The chapter concludes with a few stories of young men he defeated in the game of billiards, discussing his secret behind winning so often. This streak went on until George Robertson visited from Boston and defeated Twain at last after doubling the bet four times in a row.

=== Chapter 16 ===
Chapter 16 appeared in the April 19, 1907 issue of the North American Review. In this chapter, Twain recounts having his word discounted since he was young. Somewhere between the ages of 7 and 12, he believes his mother learned the art of interpreting his stories. Twain quotes her by saying, "I discount him thirty percent for embroidery, and what is left is perfect and priceless truth, without a flaw in it anywhere." Approximately forty years later, as part of The Monday Evening Club, Twain told a story of a dream he had foreshadowing the death of his brother, Henry. In his dream, he saw his brother dressed in one of Twain's suits, in a metallic casket, lying across two chairs, with a bouquet of roses on his breast, mostly white with a red rose in the center. Three weeks later, Henry had actually died and all of the details from his dream were present. Another member, Dr. Burton, asked how long he'd been telling the story and how often, explaining that he used to tell a story of his own and found pleasure in astonishing his audience. After 10 to 15 years, he reexamined the tale and found it to be one part fact and 24 parts embroidery. Even after the confrontation, Twain believed the accuracy of his tale.

=== Chapter 17 ===
Chapter 17 appeared in the May 3, 1907 issue of the North American Review. The initial sections of this chapter contain recollections written by daughter Susy around age thirteen. In one significant moment, he discusses how the innocent memory of bubble blowing has transformed in his mind, coming to represent the fragility of Susy's life. Twain laments the passing of his daughter, commenting, “Susy... was as lovely a bubble as any we made that day -- and as transitory. She passed... and nothing of her is left but a heartbreak and a memory.” Shifting focus from his daughter, Twain recounts brief memories of dangerous situations he witnessed as a young man. Years later, these moments have morphed into anxieties revisited during sleepless nights. Twain tells the reader of his eventual conclusion: “They were inventions of Providence to beguile me to a better life.” A final section of the chapter recalls the inspiration for Twain's short story “Jim Wolf and the Cats.” This piece was eventually disseminated far enough that other authors began to take credit for it. Twain recounts one such writer who played upon sympathies, successfully finding a way to submit the story as his own.

=== Chapter 18 ===
Chapter 18 appeared in the May 17, 1907 issue of the North American Review. This chapter covers Twain's history with schoolmates. He reflects on their stories that he remembers and even acknowledges times of envy and sympathy for his fellow pupils, recalling their past and explaining their present if he knew of it. He speaks of old crushes, past envies of hair and attraction, and those whom he knows have since passed. If a schoolmate is mentioned, there is an accompanying story of varying length. These stories are scattered throughout the chapter, but the majority of the longer ones are collected toward the end of it. As the chapter continues, Twain starts discussing others in his past not just his schoolmates. Sometimes he even finds relevance in relatives and descendants of those who made up his past.

=== Chapter 19 ===
Chapter 19 appeared in the June 7, 1907 issue of the North American Review. This chapter primarily recounts anecdotes about Twain's children and their personalities, borrowing some passages from Susy's biography to aid this. It opens with Susy recalling one of her birthday parties at which her father and some of his friends passionately played charades. When his writing returns, he notes that their passion for acting in this way transitioned into a love for putting on plays. Around the age of ten Susy had begun to write plays that she, a friend, and Clara would put on for themselves and the servants around the house. Another portion of Susy's biography has her thinking on how Twain takes his stories to Olivia to expurgate, sometimes with despair at what is taken out. Twain responds by noting that it would be a shame to take Susy's “free spelling” out, before transitioning to a discussion of Andrew Carnegie and his attempts to reform the English language to be more phonetic. He then offers several stories about his children, admiring that Susy seems to be “a thinker, a poet, and a philosopher” along with Clara's creativity shown through her musical interest.

=== Chapter 20 ===
Chapter 20 appeared in the July 5, 1907 issue of the North American Review.

In this chapter, Twain uses the phrase "Lies, damned lies, and statistics", attributing it to Benjamin Disraeli. This usage is believed to have popularised the phrase.

=== Chapter 21 ===
Chapter 21 appeared in the August 2, 1907 issue of the North American Review. This chapter has an overall theme of memory and remembrance. Twain discusses how he believes this to be the last book of his lifetime and takes the reader on a journey of random memories and inspirations for his famous novels. He begins with an excerpt from his daughter Susy's biography of him. She is worried he will not continue writing but believes that her mother, Olivia, can convince him to do so. Her writings are most likely very precious to Twain since they are something she left behind after her death. He is becoming increasingly fed up with writing and even believes he is a slave to the pen. Twain continues through the chapter being worried his memory is failing him, and therefore discusses random things he can remember. He ends with thoughts of death.

=== Chapter 22 ===
Chapter 22 appeared in the September 1907 issue of the North American Review. Twain begins this chapter with a recollection of the way he subdued a chaotic and noisy dinner conversation into a more enjoyable one, by comically showing the other attendees just how off-putting their volume was. This get-together is mentioned in his daughter Susy's biography of him. He goes on to tell a story of one of the many jokes Dean Sage, another of the guests assembled, played on a Rev. Mr. Harris. Twain spends much of the chapter discussing duels and his fascination with them, mentioning in passing his “unmaterialized” and “ineffectual” duel that he discusses in greater detail in chapter 8. He contrasts the danger of the Austrian style of dueling with the safety of the French style, though he discusses Austrian duels to a greater extent. He suggests that if the families of the duellists were required to be in attendance, duels would slow to a halt faster and more efficiently than outlawing them. He mentions his interest in the particular case of Felice Cavallotti, an Italian “poet, orator, satirist, statesman, patriot.” He had also fought in thirty Austrian-style duels, and died with his head skewered by a sword in one.

=== Chapter 23 ===
Chapter 23 appeared in the October 1907 issue of the North American Review. Twain spends most of this chapter discussing old schoolmates and people he grew up with. He considers the fact that many are now dead or very old, contrasting with the youths he had once known. He also discusses how Mr. Richmond, Twain's old Sunday school teacher, came to possess “Tom Sawyer’s cave in the hills three miles from town, and had made a tourist-resort out of it. This chapter deals quite a bit with death—not only in the deaths of his schoolmates, but the death of a twelve-year-old girl from heart disease, as well as the many deaths caused by measles in his hometown in 1845. He relates the story of how he managed to give himself the disease, how close he came to death, and the vanity and gratification felt by his young self at having all of his relatives give him so much emotional attention. Twain states that one of the proudest moments of his life was reading Sydney Brooks’ “England’s Ovation to Mark Twain.” He ends the chapter with an even prouder moment of his, that of attending the Oxford Historical Pageant Day in 1907.

=== Chapter 24 ===
Chapter 24 appeared in the November 1907 issue of the North American Review. The first half of this chapter is Twain discussing the people and small scenes that took place throughout his life. This deals with Twain's vacationing spot in Onteora Park in the Catskills Mountains where the natives were constantly surprised by the resorters’ enthusiasm for their taken-for-granted scenery. It also deals with Twain's time in Hartford, Connecticut, where he made important social and literary friends such as Charles Dudley Warner and Joel Chandler Harris. He also briefly mentions a shy fellow he knew when he was fourteen: Jim Wolf, his brother's apprentice in Hannibal, Missouri. Lastly is James Redpath, who was a publicist and friend of John Brown during the Bleeding Kansas days. Redpath would also become Twain's agent when Twain became a public lecturer since Redpath had opened a lecture business. The second half of the chapter deals with Twain's devotion to studying the human race by using himself as an example. In one of his studies, Twain compares old and broken pool tables and bowling alleys to new and improved gaming outfits. He claims that the older game outfits should be more interesting as it takes more skill to play old and broken games than new games.

=== Chapter 25 ===
Chapter 25 appeared in the December 1907 issue of the North American Review.

== Collected edition ==
In 1990 (republished February 2010) scholar Michael Kiskis edited Mark Twain’s Own Autobiography: The Chapters from the North American Review.
