= Lies, damned lies, and statistics =

Phrase criticising misuse of statistics

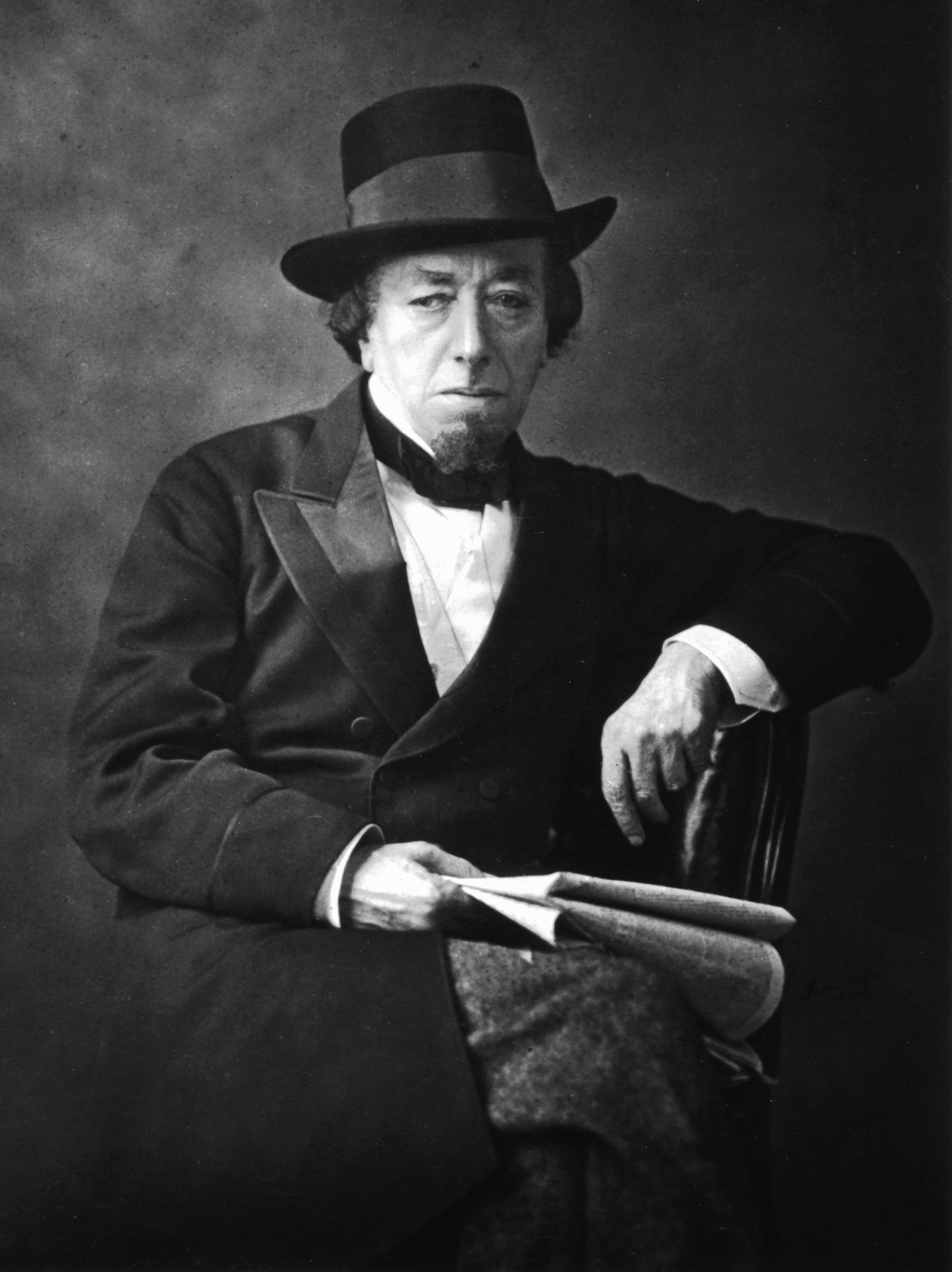
The origin of the phrase "Lies, damned lies, and statistics" is unclear, but Mark Twain attributed it to Benjamin Disraeli

"Lies, damned lies, and statistics" is a phrase describing the persuasive power of statistics to bolster weak arguments, "one of the best, and best-known" critiques of applied statistics. It is also sometimes colloquially used to doubt statistics used to prove an opponent's point.

The phrase was popularized in the United States by Mark Twain (among others), who attributed it to the British prime minister Benjamin Disraeli. However, the phrase is not found in any of Disraeli's works and the earliest known appearances were years after his death. Several other people have been listed as originators of the quote, and it is often attributed to Twain himself.

== History ==
Mark Twain popularized the saying in Chapters from My Autobiography, published in the North American Review in 1907. "Figures often beguile me," Twain wrote, "particularly when I have the arranging of them myself; in which case the remark attributed to Disraeli would often apply with justice and force: 'There are three kinds of lies: lies, damned lies, and statistics.'"

Alternative attributions include, among many others (for example Walter Bagehot and Arthur James Balfour), the radical English journalist and politician Henry Du Pré Labouchère (1831–1912), Jervoise Athelstane Baines, and British politician and scholar Leonard H. Courtney, who used the phrase in 1895 and two years later became president of the Royal Statistical Society. Courtney is quoted by Baines (1896) as attributing the phrase to a "wise statesman", but he may have been referring to a future statesman rather than a past one. The phrase has also been attributed to Arthur Wellesley, 1st Duke of Wellington.

The phrase is quoted frequently in 1895, but there is an example from 1894: "His less enthusiastic neighbor thinks of the proverbial kinds of falsehoods, “lies, damned lies, and statistics,” and replies: “Reports of large numbers of cases subjected to operation seldom fail to beget a suspicion of unjustifiable risk.”"

A Dictionary of English Folklore claims that the earliest instance resembling the phrase found in print is a letter written in the British newspaper National Observer on June 8, 1891, published June 13, 1891, p. 93(–94): NATIONAL PENSIONS [To the Editor of The National Observer] London, 8 June 1891 "Sir, —It has been wittily remarked that there are three kinds of falsehood: the first is a 'fib,' the second is a downright lie, and the third and most aggravated is statistics. It is on statistics and on the absence of statistics that the advocate of national pensions relies ..." Later, in October 1891, as a query in Notes and Queries, the pseudonymous questioner, signing as "St Swithin", asked for the originator of the phrase, indicating common usage even at that date. The pseudonym has been attributed to Eliza Gutch.

The American Dialect Society list archives include numerous posts by Stephen Goranson that cite research into uses soon after the above. They include:

- Sir Charles Wentworth Dilke (1843–1911) is reported twice in October 1891 to have used the phrase, without attributing it to others:

"Sir Charles Dilke [1843–1911] was saying the other day that false statements might be arranged according to their degree under three heads, fibs, lies, and statistics." The Bristol Mercury and Daily Post, Monday, October 19, 1891
The Derby Mercury (Derby, England), October 21, 1891; Issue 9223 "Sir Charles Dilke and the Bishops" "A mass meeting of the slate quarry-men of Festiniog [Ffestiniog, Wales] was held Wednesday night [Oct. 14] to protest against certain dismissals from one of the quarries ...." He [Dilke] observed that the speeches of the Bishops on the disestablishment question reminded him that there were three degrees of untruth—a fib, a lie, and statistics (Laughter)"

- The phrase, as noted by Robert Giffen in 1892, was a variation on a phrase about three types of unreliable witnesses, a liar, a damned liar, and an expert from The Economic Journal the paper was previously read at a meeting of the Australasian Association for the Advancement of Science at Hobart in January 1892. Robert Giffen (1837–1910, Walter Bagehot's assistant editor at The Economist 1868 ff.; 1882–4 President of the Statistical Society): "An old jest runs to the effect that there are three degrees of comparison among liars. There are liars, there are outrageous liars, and there are scientific experts. This has lately been adapted to throw dirt upon statistics. There are three degrees of comparison, it is said, in lying. There are lies, there are outrageous lies, and there are statistics."
- That phrase can be found in Nature, page 74 November 26, 1885: "A well-known lawyer, now a judge, once grouped witnesses into three classes: simple liars, damned liars, and experts. He did not mean that the expert uttered things which he knew to be untrue, but that by the emphasis which he laid on certain statements, and by what has been defined as a highly cultivated faculty of evasion, the effect was actually worse than if he had."
- A minute of the X Club meeting held on 5 December 1885, recorded by Thomas Henry Huxley, noted "Talked politics, scandal, and the three classes of witnesses—liars, d—d liars, and experts." Quoted in 1900 in Leonard Huxley's The Life and Letters of Thomas Henry Huxley.

Colin White traces the origins to François Magendie (1783–1855). According to White, while arguing against using blood-letting to treat fever and confronted with statistical numbers he believed to be manufactured, this French physiologist stated: "Thus the alteration of the truth which is already manifesting itself in the progressive form of lying and perjury, offers us, in the superlative, the statistics." In White's opinion, the world had a need of this phrase, many people "would have been proud" to coin it, and the origins are now obscured, as the phrase passed "from wit to wit". White is referring to the work of Paul Delaunay, however, Delaunay's text, while using the phrase, does not explicitly attribute it to Magendie. John Bibby and David R. Bellhouse also mention Magendie's authorship.

== Uses ==
The phrase has been used in the title of a number of popular expositions, including:

- Lies, Damned Lies, and Statistics: The Manipulation of Public Opinion in America, by Michael Wheeler (W. W. Norton & Co. 1976; Dell paperback 1978).
- Quotes, Damned Quotes ..... some of them to do with statistics (1985), by John Bibby – an attempt to untangle the history of this quotation.
- Damned Lies and Statistics: Untangling Numbers from the Media, Politicians, and Activists (2001), by University of Delaware sociologist Joel Best (ISBN 978-0520219786).
- Lies, Damned Lies, and Drug War Statistics: A Critical Analysis of Claims Made by the Office of National Drug Control Policy (2014), by Matthew B. Robinson & Renee G. Scherlen SUNY Press; ISBN 9781438448381

The essay The Median Isn't the Message by Stephen Jay Gould begins by repeating this quote. Gould explains how the statistic that peritoneal mesothelioma, the form of cancer with which he was diagnosed in 1982, has a "median survival time of eight months" is misleading.

"Lies, Damn Lies and Statistics" is the title of episode 21 in the first season of NBC drama The West Wing.

== Sources ==
- White, Colin (December 1964). "Unkind Cuts at Statisticians". The American Statistician. 18 (5): 15–17. doi:10.1080/00031305.1964.10482634. eISSN 1537-2731. ISSN 0003-1305. JSTOR 2682462.
- Velleman, Paul F. (July 2008). "Truth, Damn Truth, and Statistics". Journal of Statistics Education. 16 (2): 97. doi:10.1080/10691898.2008.11889565. eISSN 1069-1898. S2CID 117611755.
- Деружинский, Григорий Викторович (2015). "Существуют три вида обмана: ложь, наглая ложь и статистика. Этимология афоризма" [There are three kinds of lies: lies, damned lies, and statistics. Etymology of the aphorism]. Вопросы статистики (in Russian) (6): 85–88. doi:10.34023/2313-6383-2015-0-6-85-88 (inactive 12 July 2025).
- Delaunay, Paul (1953). "Les doctrines médicales au début du XIXe siècle. Louis et la méthode numérique". In Underwood, E.A. (ed.). Science, Medicine, and History (in French). Oxford University Press. ISBN 978-0-598-60762-1.
- Bibby, John (1986). Quotes, Damned Quotes, And-: An Anthology of Sayings, Epithets, and Witticisms - Several of Them Something to Do with Statistics. J. Bibby. p. 30. ISBN 978-0-946544-01-1.
- Bellhouse, David R. (1987). "Un jour, ce fut mon tour ..." (PDF). Liaison. 1 (3). Statistical Society of Canada: 43–45.
