= Isabel Lyon =

Photographer and Mark Twain's secretary (1863–1958)

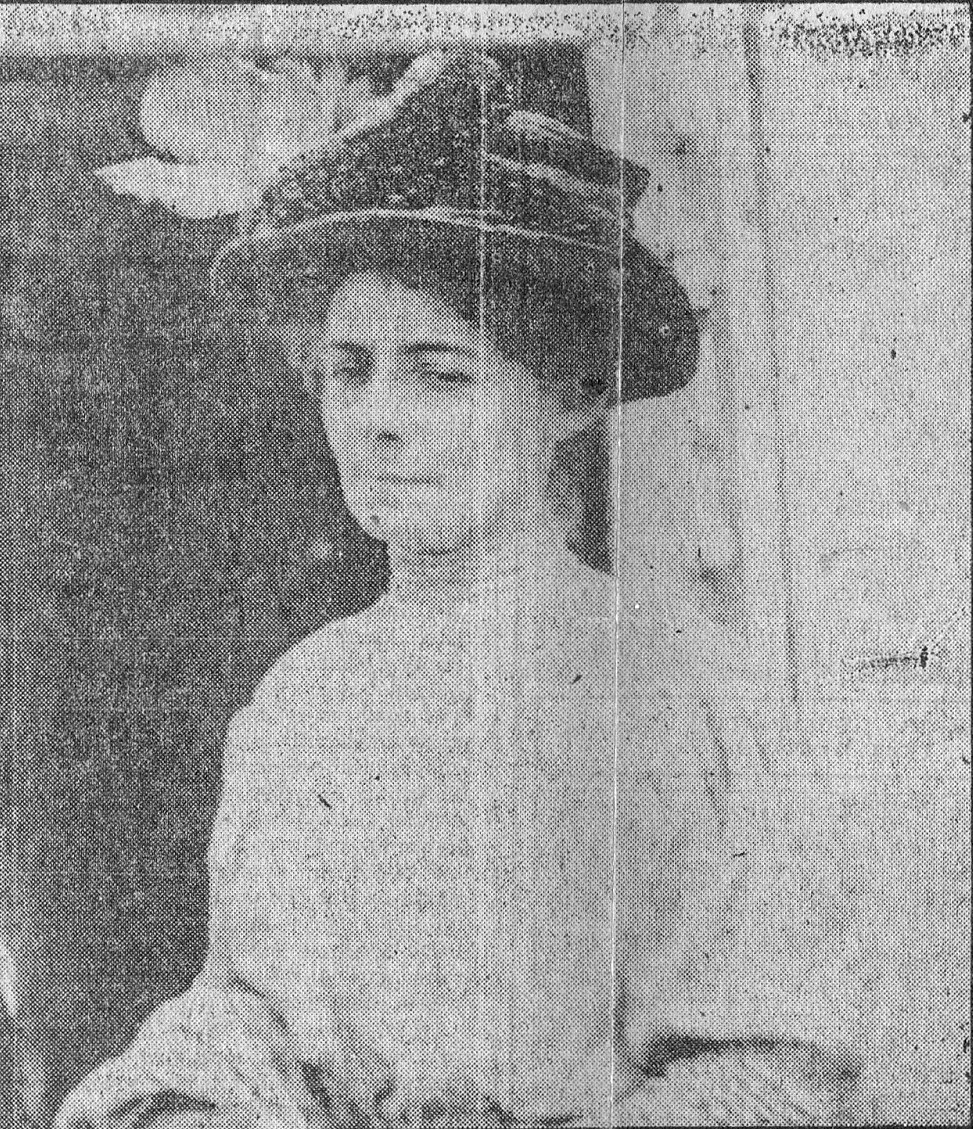
1909 newspaper photo

Isabel Van Kleek Lyon (December 15, 1863 – December 4, 1958) was Mark Twain's secretary for most of his final years. While in this position, she gained significant influence over Twain's personal and business affairs. Twain fired her in 1909 for reasons that remain in dispute.

== Mark Twain's secretary ==
Lyon was born in Tarrytown, New York, to a well-off family. Her father's early death plunged the family into poverty, and Lyon became a governess. She became acquainted with Twain in the 1890s and often played whist with him. In 1902, Twain hired Lyon as a secretary because his wife, Olivia, was becoming too ill to handle his correspondence. After Olivia's death in 1904, Lyon moved into Twain's house and assisted him with his autobiography. She also disbursed allowances to Twain's daughters Clara and Jean. Lyon helped to supervise the construction of Stormfield, Twain's estate in Redding, Connecticut, and managed the property afterwards. Twain bought Lyon a house, called The Lobster Pot, near Stormfield to keep her close by. Twain's trust in Lyon caused him to grant her a power of attorney in 1907.

== Dismissal ==
In March 1909, Lyon married Ralph Ashcroft, a business associate of Twain. At about this time, Twain allegedly began to suspect Lyon of using her position to help herself to his money, particularly for remodeling her house. He also alleged that Lyon was scheming to marry him. Detailed research indicates that Clara Clemens, an aspiring singer, turned Twain against Lyon out of fear that Lyon would expose Clara's extramarital affair with her married accompanist. Another researcher who relied heavily upon Twain's papers stated that Twain's charges were accurate and that Lyon was trying to isolate Twain from his daughters, especially Jean, who was epileptic and dependent on Twain for support.

Biographer Hamlin Hill defends Lyon in his book, Mark Twain, God's Fool. He states "Isabel probably did expend $2,000 more on the renovations of her cottage than the $1,500 she officially borrowed. That she did so as premeditated embezzlement could only be persuasive to a mind so confused that logical counterargument was unacceptable...She could well have claimed that a fee for the interior decorating of a $45,000 house [Stormfield] would have more than covered the costs of her own cottage...Her mistake was in not questioning whether Clemens' loyalty to her was as compelling and powerful as her loyalty to him".

Twain fired Lyon in April 1909 and forced her to return the property, called The Lobster Pot, that he had given her. Twain was bitter over the affair; he denounced Lyon as "a liar, a forger, a thief, a hypocrite, a drunkard, a sneak, a humbug, a traitor, a conspirator, a filthy-minded & salacious slut pining for seduction." He wrote a 429-page manuscript outlining his complaints against Lyon and Ashcroft. This "Ashcroft-Lyon Manuscript" was kept private by Twain with his intention being to publish it if Lyon were to go public with details of the relationship. It was published in 2015 as part of the third volume of Twain's autobiography.

== Later years ==
Lyon and Ashcroft moved to Canada and divorced in 1927, after which Lyon moved to New York and resumed work as a secretary. She seldom spoke of her years with Twain, but she met regularly with Hal Holbrook, who was developing his one-man show Mark Twain Tonight.

Lyon died of a heart attack in her Greenwich Village apartment on December 4, 1958, two weeks before her 95th birthday.
