= Woodlawn Cemetery (Elmira, New York) =

Historic cemetery in Chemung County, New York, United States

- Woodlawn Cemetery and Woodlawn National Cemetery
- U.S. National Register of Historic Places
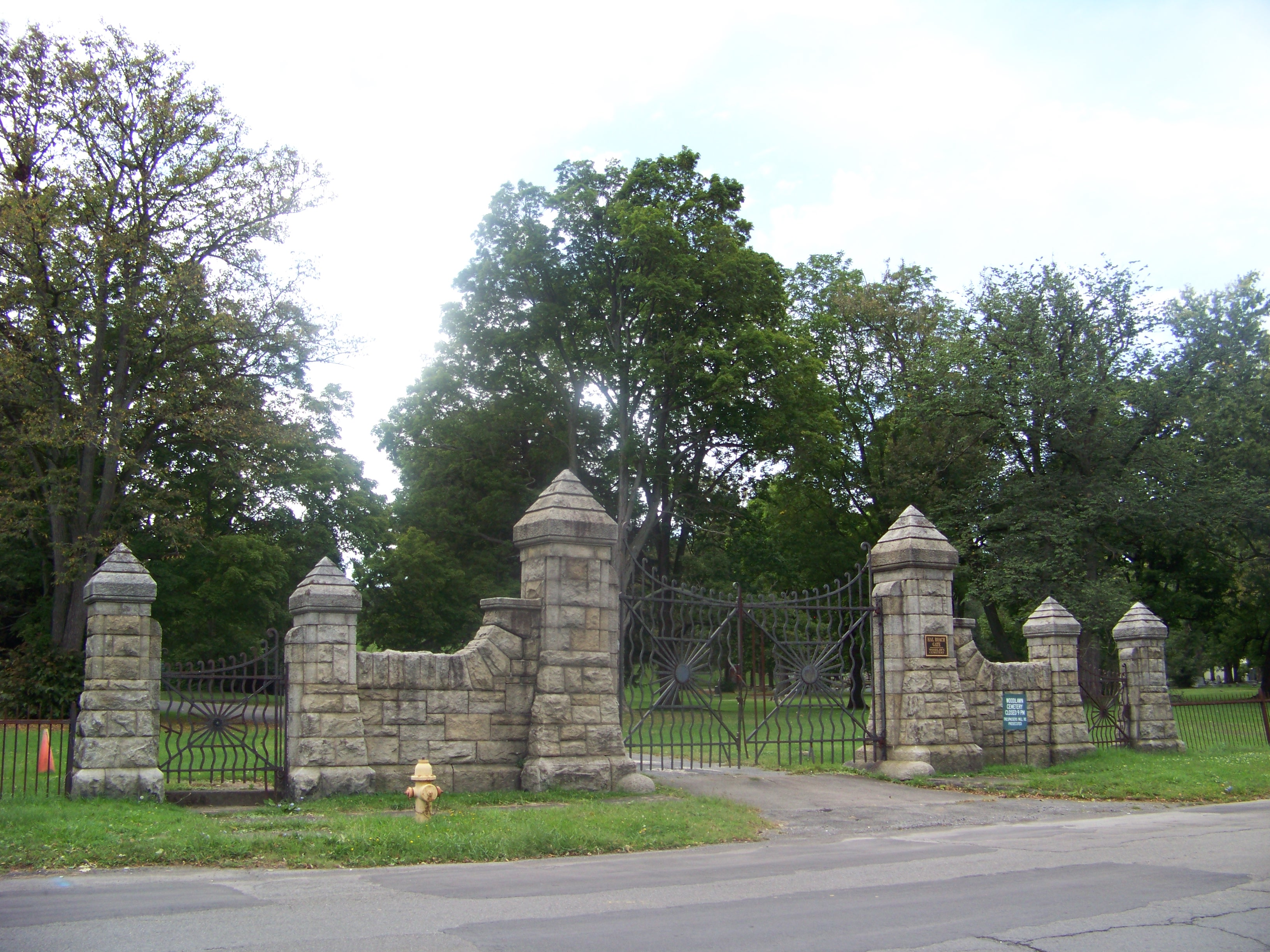
- Historic Davis Street gate to Woodlawn Cemetery

- Location within New York Location within the United States
- Location: Elmira, New York
- Coordinates: 42°06′12″N 76°49′50″W
- Built: 1864
- Architect: Pierce & Bickford
- NRHP reference No.: 04001117
- Added to NRHP: October 6, 2004

Woodlawn Cemetery is the name of a cemetery in Elmira, New York, United States. Its most famous burials are Mark Twain and his wife Olivia Langdon Clemens. Many members of the United States Congress, including Jacob Sloat Fassett are also interred there.

Within Woodlawn Cemetery is the distinct Woodlawn National Cemetery, begun with the interment of Confederate prisoners from the nearby Elmira Prison (dubbed "Hellmira" by its inmates) during the American Civil War. It is run by the United States Department of Veterans Affairs.

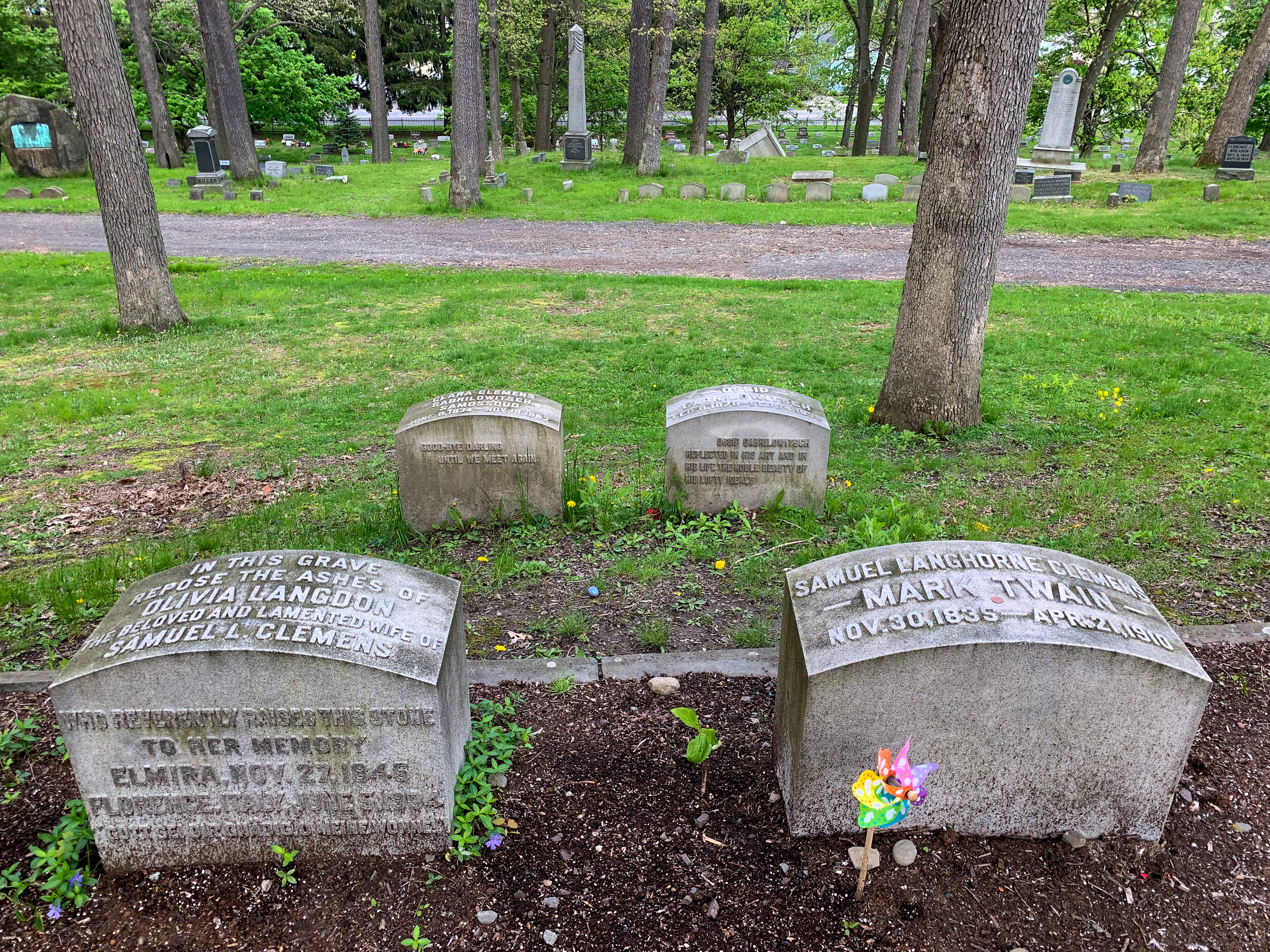
Graves of Olivia Langdon Clemens and Mark Twain

Both cemeteries are still active and together were added to the National Register of Historic Places in 2004.

== Notable burials ==
- John Arnot, Jr. (1831–1886), US Representative, mayor, Civil War veteran, businessman
- Tracy Beadle (1808–1877), member of the New York State Assembly
- James Chaplin Beecher (1828–1886), Civil War general
- Frank LaMar Christian (1876–1955), prison warden
- Clara Clemens (1874–1962), concert singer and Mark Twain's only surviving child and widow of Ossip Gabrilowitsch
- Jean Clemens (1880–1909), Mark Twain's youngest daughter
- Olivia Langdon Clemens (1845–1904), Mark Twain's wife and editor
- Susy Clemens (1872–1896), Mark Twain's eldest daughter and a biographer of him
- Ernie Davis (1939–1963), Heisman Trophy winner from Syracuse University
- Alexander S. Diven (1809–1896), Civil War general
- Jacob Sloat Fassett (1853–1924), US Representative
- Thomas S. Flood (1844–1908), US Representative
- Ossip Gabrilowitsch (1878–1936), Russian-born American pianist married to Clara Clemens.
- Hiram Gray (1801–1890), US Representative
- Edward M. Hoffman (1857–1901), Adjutant General of New York
- John W. Jones (1817–1900), ex-slave and sexton of Woodlawn National Cemetery
- Thomas Maxwell (1792–1864), US Representative
- Anna Campbell Palmer (1854–1928), novelist
- Samuel Partridge (1790–1883), US Representative
- Alexander W. Randall (1819–1872), 6th Governor of Wisconsin
- Hal Roach (1892–1992), comedy film & television producer
- Lucius Robinson (1810–1891), Governor of New York
- Hosea H. Rockwell (1840–1918), US Representative
- Horace B. Smith (1826–1888), US Representative
- Esther Baker Steele (1835–1911), educator, author, editor, philanthropist
- Mark Twain (Samuel L. Clemens) (1835–1910), author
- Asher Tyler (1798–1875), US Representative
- Jonas S. Van Duzer (1846–1918), creamery manufacturer and assemblyman

== Gallery ==
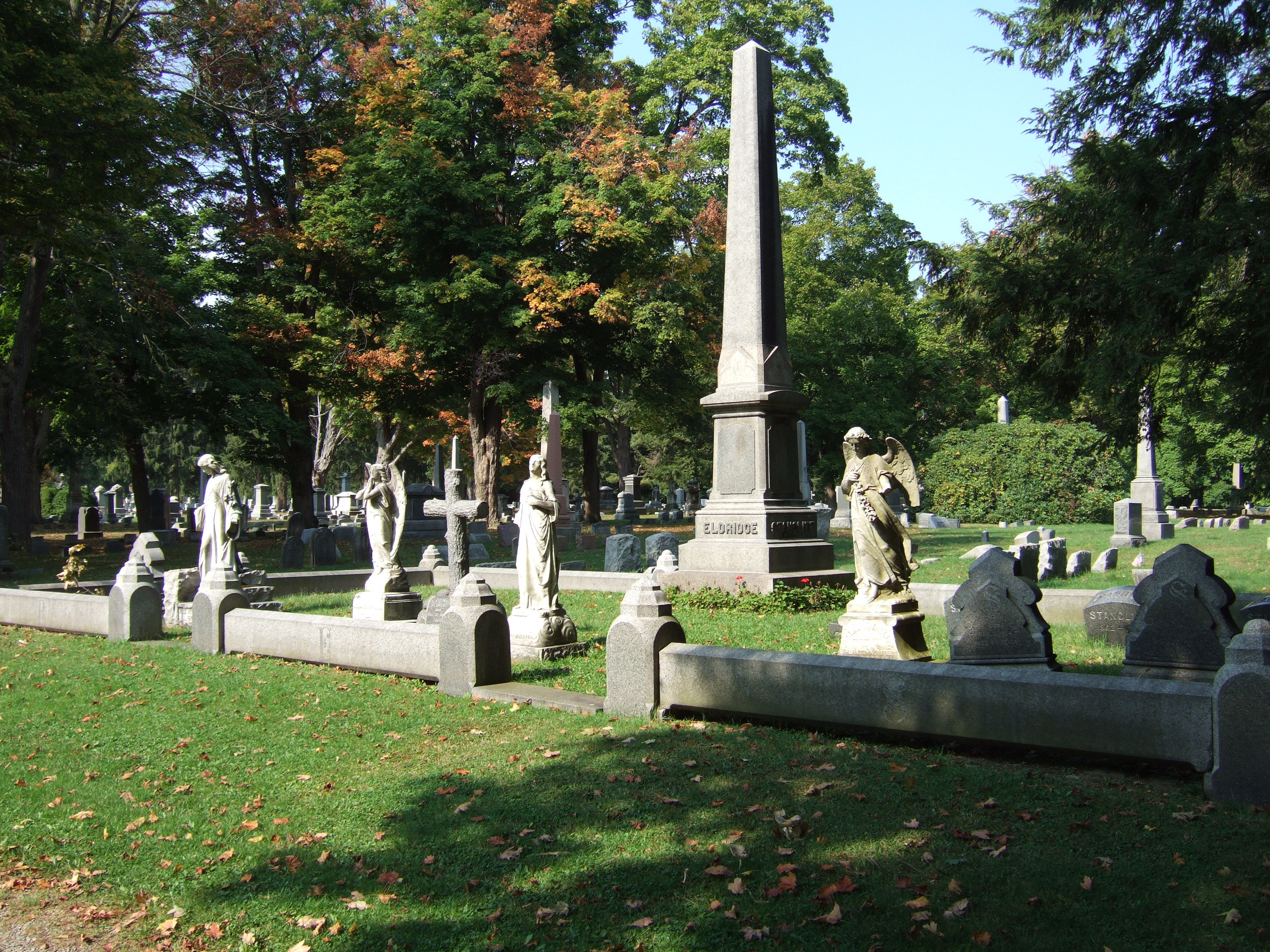

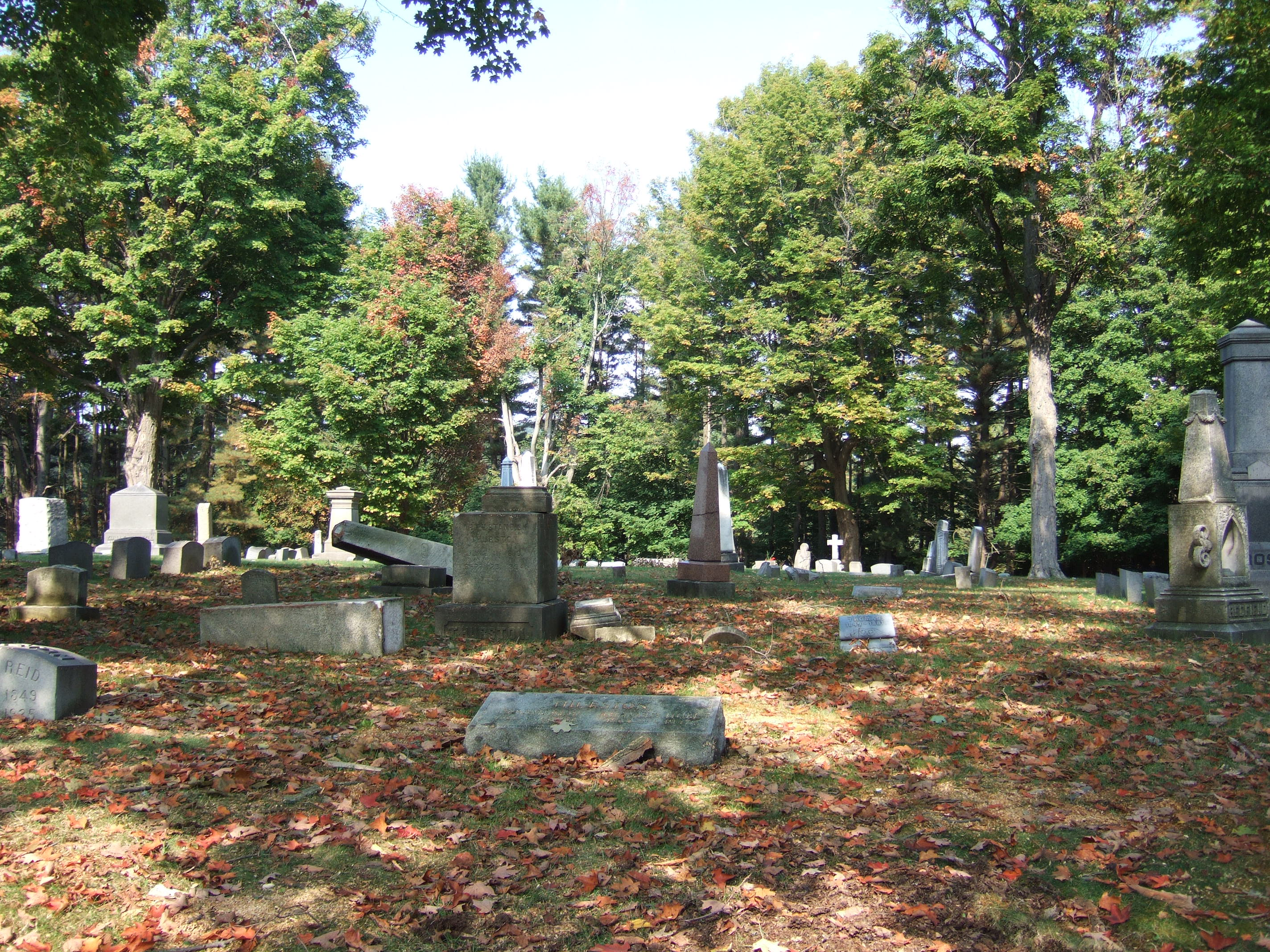

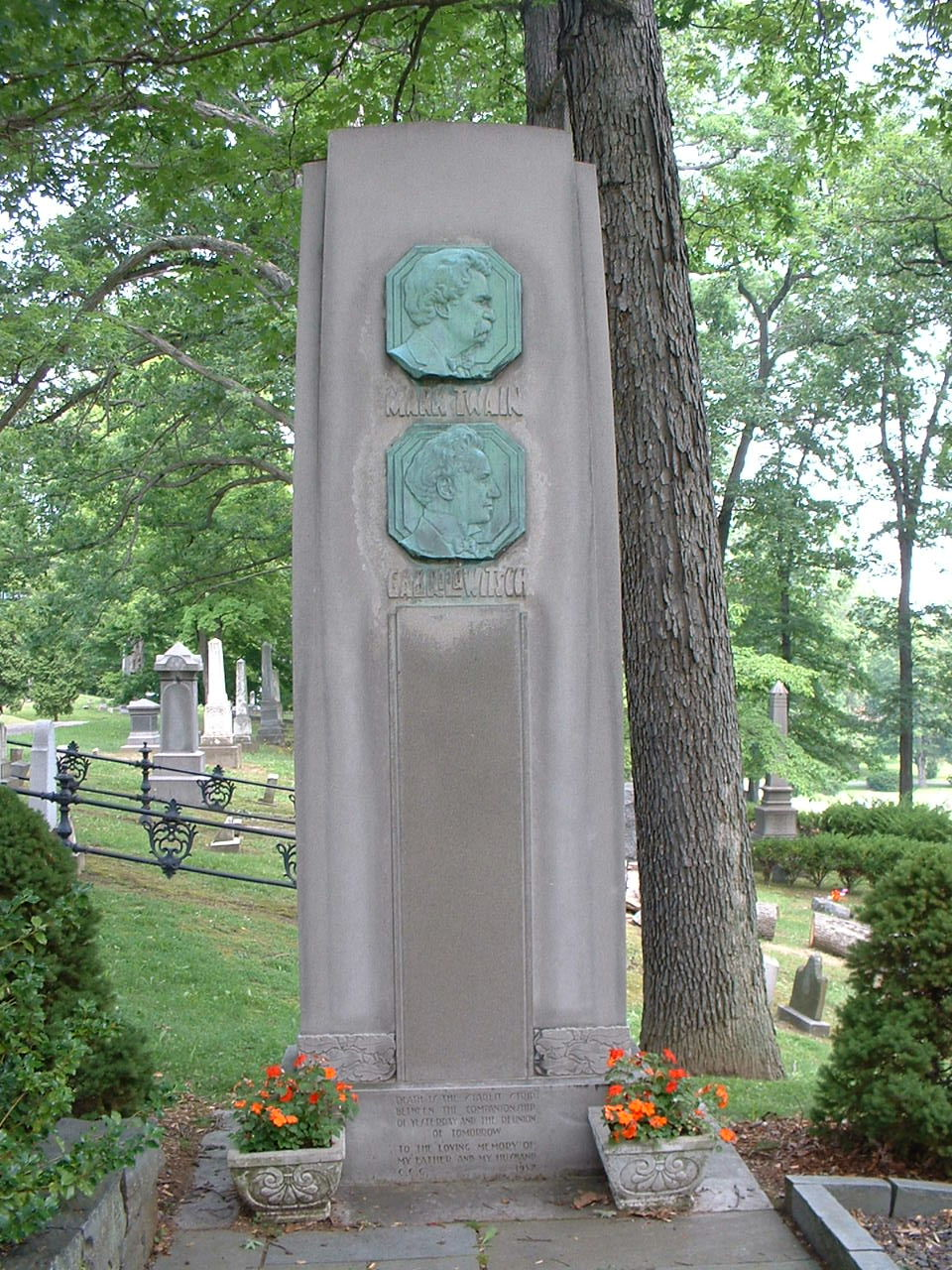
