= Olivia Clemens =

Olivia Clemens may refer to:

- Olivia Langdon Clemens (1845–1904), wife of Mark Twain
- Olivia Susan Clemens (1872–1896), usually known as Susy Clemens, daughter of Mark Twain
