= Personal Recollections of Joan of Arc =

1896 novel by Mark Twain

- First edition cover
- Author: Mark Twain
- Illustrator: Frank DuMond
- Language: English
- Genre: Historical fiction
- Publisher: Harper & Brothers
- Publication date: 1896
- Publication place: United States
- Media type: Print (hardcover, paperback)
- Pages: 260 pp

Personal Recollections of Joan of Arc, by the Sieur Louis de Conte is an 1896 novel by Mark Twain which recounts the life of Joan of Arc.

The novel is presented as a translation by "Jean Francois Alden" of memoirs by Sieur Louis de Conte, a fictionalized version of Joan of Arc's page Louis de Contes. He has the same initials as Samuel Langhorne Clemens, Mark Twain's real name. The novel is divided into three sections according to Joan of Arc's development: a youth in Domrémy, a commander of the army of Charles VII of France, and a defendant at trial in Rouen. They are entitled "In Domremy", "In Court and Camp", and "Trial and Martyrdom".

The novel was first published as a serialization in Harper's Magazine beginning in April 1895. Twain was aware of his reputation as a comic writer and he asked that each installment appear anonymously so that readers would treat it seriously. Regardless, his authorship soon became known, and Harper and Brothers published the book edition with his name in May 1896.

Many events in the novel are fictionalized; however, the main events in the life of Joan are rendered faithfully.

== Synopsis ==
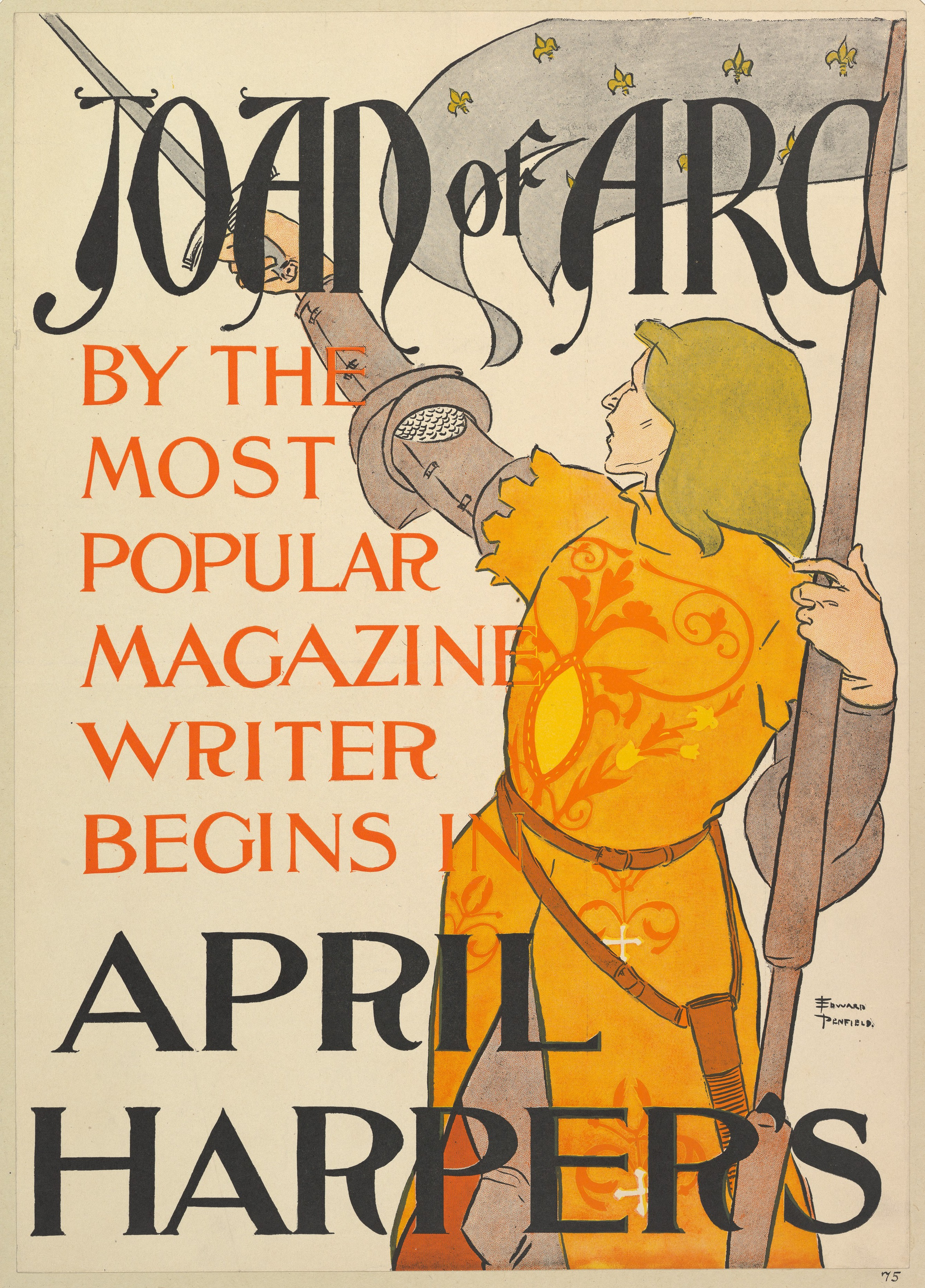
Harper's Magazine poster by Edward Penfield for the debut of Personal Recollections of Joan of Arc (April 1895)

=== Introduction ===
The novel begins with "the Translator's Preface"; then follows a short note entitled "A Peculiarity of Joan of Arc's History" also written by "The Translator". Finally, a foreword is presented by "The Sieur Louis de Conte", who represents an actual person in the life of Joan of Arc but here is fictionalized by the author Mark Twain as a childhood playmate of Joan who later serves as her page and secretary. The "Translator's Preface" offers an overview of Joan of Arc's life, with heavy praise: "the character of Joan of Arc ... occupies the loftiest possible to human attainment". The short "Peculiarity" note explains, first, that many actual details about (the long-ago) life of Joan of Arc are uniquely established and known, having been recorded under oath in court documents that are preserved in the National Archives of France; and, that the "mass of added particulars" here are provided by Sieur de Conte, whom, the (fictional) Translator assures us, is reliable.

In the foreword, Twain's fictional Sieur Louis de Conte presents himself in the year 1492—more than 60 years after Joan of Arc's death in 1431—as writing his "Personal Recollections ..." about the life of Joan of Arc and his intimate relation to it: "I was with her from the beginning until the end". Here author Twain assigns his character Sieur de Conte to serve as the first-person narrator of his Joan of Arc story, and perhaps to serve as an alter-ego of the author in that role.

=== Book One: In Domrémy ===
Book One begins with the first-person narrator Sieur Louis de Conte relating that he was born on January 6, 1410, in Neufchâteau, France—after his family "...had fled to those distant regions from the neighborhood of Paris in the first years of the century." He relates that Paris was then tormented by mobs, criminals, and other instabilities and that his parents had been persecuted there because they supported the King of France against his enemies the English and Burgundians. Even so, when de Conte was but five, his native village was devastated and his family massacred by a Burgundian raiding party. Now orphaned, he was sent to a small, rural, rudimentary village called Domrémy to live with the parish priest there, (who taught young de Conte to read and write). In that village, he meets the young Joan d’Arc, an illiterate peasant girl who was exactly two years younger than him. Recalling the ordinary times as well as the extraordinary events of Joan's childhood life in Domrémy, de Conte now tells of multiple incidents where Joan is shown to be precocious: the wisest, bravest, most virtuous child in the small village. He details her arguments in defense of the village fairies (made to the priest); also in support of a homeless soldier and of a criminal madman.

In Chapters VI through VIII, de Conte recounts seeing Joan converse with a divine entity, then learning (from her explanation) that she has been chosen by God to "win back France, and set the crown upon the head of His servant that is Dauphin and shall be King." When she publicly announces this mission the local governor and the villagers mock her, and her parents put her under "strict watch." Nonetheless, Joan remains adamant.

At age sixteen Joan is confronted with a lawsuit claiming breach of promise to marry, filed by a delusional youth of the village. She declines to seek legal counsel, electing to conduct her own defense. She adroitly cross-examines the young man, reducing his testimony "rag by rag to ruin," and prompting the judge to throw the complaint out of court.

=== Book Two: In Court and Camp ===
Book Two begins with the elimination of Joan's hindrances. With support from her visions, Joan leaves the village at age 17 to request control of the army from the king. In Chapter IX, after Joan successfully defends herself in trial for witchcraft, the king appoints Joan "General-in-Chief of armies."

In Chapter X, Joan begins to organize her campaign, writing a letter to the English commanders at Orléans, demanding they vacate France. The English refuse, and Joan attacks immediately and aggressively despite the generals' and counselors' advice that France remain on the defensive. Through this military campaign, Joan secures several victories over the English. On July 5, the English forces surrender at Rheims, allowing the Bloodless March and coronation of Charles to take place. During the coronation, asked by the king to name her reward for her services to France, Joan requests the taxes on Domremy be remitted.

After the coronation, Joan requests permission to attack Paris, saying that the move would cripple the English forces. The king's counselors, however, oppose her in the attempt. The king initially grants Joan permission to attack, but just as Joan is on the verge of victory, the king announces a long-term truce, which indicates a ceasefire and leaves Paris in enemy hands. Joan and de Conte are upset at the lost opportunity.

The final chapter relates the events of May 24, 1430, in which Joan and the French lose a battle to the English and Burgundian troops, resulting in Joan's capture.

Throughout Book 2, de Conte speaks of Joan's virtue (her ban on prostitution, gambling, and profanity in the army; her requirement that each man attend church; and her mercy toward English prisoners) as well as Joan's divine powers (her recognizing the king without notice, finding a hidden sword in the church, foreseeing war-wounds and her impending death).

=== Book Three: Trial and Martyrdom ===
The third and final book opens with Joan d’Arc's imprisonment at Marguy. For five and a half months, the Burgundians hold Joan, waiting for King Charles to provide a ransom of 61,125 francs. When no attempt is made, she is sold to the English. For two more months, Joan remains imprisoned while her enemies, led by Bishop Pierre Cauchon of Beauvais, prepare her trial. In an attempt to lessen her influence over the French people, they decide to try Joan for crimes against religion.

Beginning in Chapter IV, the novel provides a detailed account of Joan's three-month-long trial starting on February 21, 1431. de Conte, secretly serving as clerk to the chief recorder, describes the trial as unfair on multiple fronts, including the biased judges and the lack of advocates on her behalf.

The questions at trial focus on topics such as the visions, her cross-dressing, and her upbringing. de Conte stresses that Joan, the illiterate peasant, fared extremely well, providing well-spoken answers that could not be twisted against her. Chapter VII recounts her most well-known answer after being asked by Beaupere, “Are you in a state of Grace?” (This is a trick question asked by Beaupere. According to Catholic teaching, only God knows who is in a state of Grace. By answering either yes or no, Joan can be accused of blasphemy.) Conte states that with simple gravity she answers, “If I be not in a state of Grace, I pray God place me in it; if I be in it, I pray God keep me so.”

In Chapter XX, Joan finally submits to her captors before she is about to die at the stake. Unable to read, Joan unknowingly signs a document “confessing herself a sorceress, a dealer with devils, a liar, a blasphemer of God and His angels…and this signature of hers bound her to resume the dress of a woman." At the end of Chapter XXI, readers may think that de Conte insinuates Joan d'Arc was raped in prison by the English guards due to the vague wording. It is important, however, to note that at the end of Chapter XXIII, this interpretation is directly gone against by Joan's own statements, relayed by de Conte, during a passionate outburst of indignation and despair by Joan to those dooming her, specifically referring to herself as one who has "never been defiled." If this were the case, she would have taken them to task for this cruelty at that time, and it would have been reflected in the narrative.

In Chapter XXII, de Conte accuses the English of treachery. While Joan slept, one of the guards removed her female apparel and put male apparel in its place. "For modesty's sake," Joan put on the male clothes, "the forbidden garments, knowing what the end would be."

For breaking the condition that she not wear men's clothing again, Joan is convicted as a "relapsed heretic." She burns at the stake on the following Wednesday, May 30, 1431.

=== Conclusion ===
The fictional biographer, de Conte, ends his presentation in the year 1492, when he is 82 years of age. He summarizes the lives and deaths of many of the characters, including Joan's family and King Charles the VII. He closes with a salute to the legacy of Joan, citing her impact on the country she loved so much.

== Writing process ==
I like Joan of Arc best of all my books; and it is the best; I know it perfectly well. And besides, it furnished me seven times the pleasure afforded me by any of the others; twelve years of preparation, and two years of writing. The others needed no preparation and got none.

— Mark Twain

Joan of Arc largely lacks the humor prevalent in Twain's other works, and it has a different tone and flow. He had a personal fascination with Joan of Arc which began in the early 1850s when he found a leaf from her biography and asked his brother Henry if she was a real person. Cultural historian Ted Gioia notes that Twain was "raised in a Southern culture that was deeply suspicious of – and sometimes openly hostile to – Roman Catholicism", but that in the novel Twain comes across as passionately Catholic.

Twain claimed to have worked harder on this book than any other. He wrote to H.H. Rogers, "I have never done any work before that cost so much thinking and weighing and measuring and planning and cramming." The published book lists 11 official sources as "authorities examined in verification of the truthfulness of this narrative". Historians today agree that Twain conducted the bulk of his investigation during his prolonged stay in Europe during the early 1890s, which included multiple stops in France. He apparently drew most of his information from the fifth volume of Jules Michelet's Histoire de France and Jules Quicherat's Proces de condamnation et de rehabilitation de Jeanne d’Arc. Joan of Arc's story was relatively unknown at that time, especially in English-speaking nations, which makes Twain's research noteworthy.

Twain based Joan of Arc's physical appearance on his daughter Susy Clemens, as he remembered her at age 17. He began writing the novel late in 1892, then set it aside until 1894; he finished the manuscript in 1895. He serialized an abridged version for magazine publication, then published the full-length book in 1896.

== Reception ==
=== Twain's self-evaluation, and contemporary critics ===
Twain considered this work to be his best and most important. It was fairly well received in 1895 when first published. In her biography of her father, Twain's daughter Clara Clemens reported a positive review of the work in The Morning Leader:

We meet a dignified, ennobled, hero-worshipping Mark Twain. His language has undergone a startling change. Not flippancy, but pathos, meets us on every page; the sardonic mocking spirit has been conquered by the fair Maid of Orleans, and where aforetime we met laughter, we now meet tears.

And she wrote that "Andrew Lang so much admired Father’s Joan that he suggested dedicating to him his own biography of the Maid."

As a child, Coley Taylor was Twain's neighbor in Redding, Connecticut, where Twain lived from 1908 until his death in 1910. He told the story of the day when he approached Twain as a young boy to profess his adulation for Tom Sawyer and Huckleberry Finn. Upon hearing the boy's praises, Twain suddenly took on the mien of a vexed schoolteacher. "You shouldn’t read those books about bad boys," he said, wagging his finger in Taylor's face. "My best book is my Recollections of Joan of Arc."

=== 20th-century critics ===
However, 20th-century critics have not favored Recollections, and it is hardly read or acknowledged in the mainstream today, especially compared to Twain's comedic works such as Huckleberry Finn, Pudd'n Head Wilson, and Tom Sawyer.

In the preface to his play Saint Joan, G. B. Shaw accused Twain of being "infatuated" with Joan of Arc. Shaw says that Twain "romanticizes" the story of Joan, reproducing a legend that the English deliberately rigged the trial to find her guilty of witchcraft and heresy. Recent study of the trial transcripts, however, suggests that Twain's depiction may have been closer to the truth than Shaw was willing to accept.

American author and historian Bernard DeVoto was also critical of Joan of Arc, calling it "mawkish". De Voto also claims that Twain "was uncomfortable in the demands of tragedy, formalizing whatever could not be sentimentalized." Maxwell Geismar delivered a scathing review, describing it as Twain's worst book: "It is difficult to find anything of interest in Joan of Arc – except its badness". Twain scholar Louis J. Budd said that Personal Recollections of Joan of Arc "has disgraced Twain posthumously with several levels of readers", even though "it met general approval in 1896".

Susan Harris (Note: Susan K. Harris is a Twain expert who teaches at the University of Kansas, who helped produce the novel's 1996 edition by Oxford University Press.) expresses befuddlement at this work's placement in Twain's body of works: "By the time Twain is writing Recollections, he's not a believer. He is anti-Catholic, and he doesn't like the French. So he writes a book about a French-Catholic-martyr? Ostensibly, it doesn't make a lot of sense."

== See also ==
- Mark Twain bibliography

== Sources ==
- Ward, Geoffrey C., Duncan, Dayton, and Burns, Ken, (2001). Mark Twain: An Illustrated Biography. Alfred A. Knopf. ISBN 0-375-40561-5.
- Long, E. Hudson (1957). Mark Twain Handbook. New York: Hendricks House, Inc.
- Twain, Mark (1989). Personal Recollections of Joan of Arc. San Francisco: Ignatius Press. ISBN 0-89870-268-2.
- Gerber, John (1988). Mark Twain. Boston: Twayne Publishers. ISBN 0-8057-7518-8.
- Bloom, Harold (1986). Mark Twain. New York: Chelsea House Publishers. ISBN 0-87754-698-3.
- Bellamy, Gladys Carmen (1950). Mark Twain As a Literary Artist. Norman: University of Oklahoma Press.
- Geismar, Maxwell (1970). Mark Twain An American Prophet. New York: McGraw-Hill Book Company.
- Budd, Louis (1983). Our Mark Twain The Making of His Public Personality. Philadelphia: University of Pennsylvania Press. ISBN 0-8122-1204-5.
- Clemens, Clara (1931). My Father Mark Twain. New York: Harper & Brothers Publishers.
- Blanck, Jacob (1957). Bibliography of American Literature. Vol. 2: George W. Cable to Timothy Dwight. New Haven: Yale University Press.
