= Jean Clemens =

Youngest daughter of Mark Twain (1880–1909)

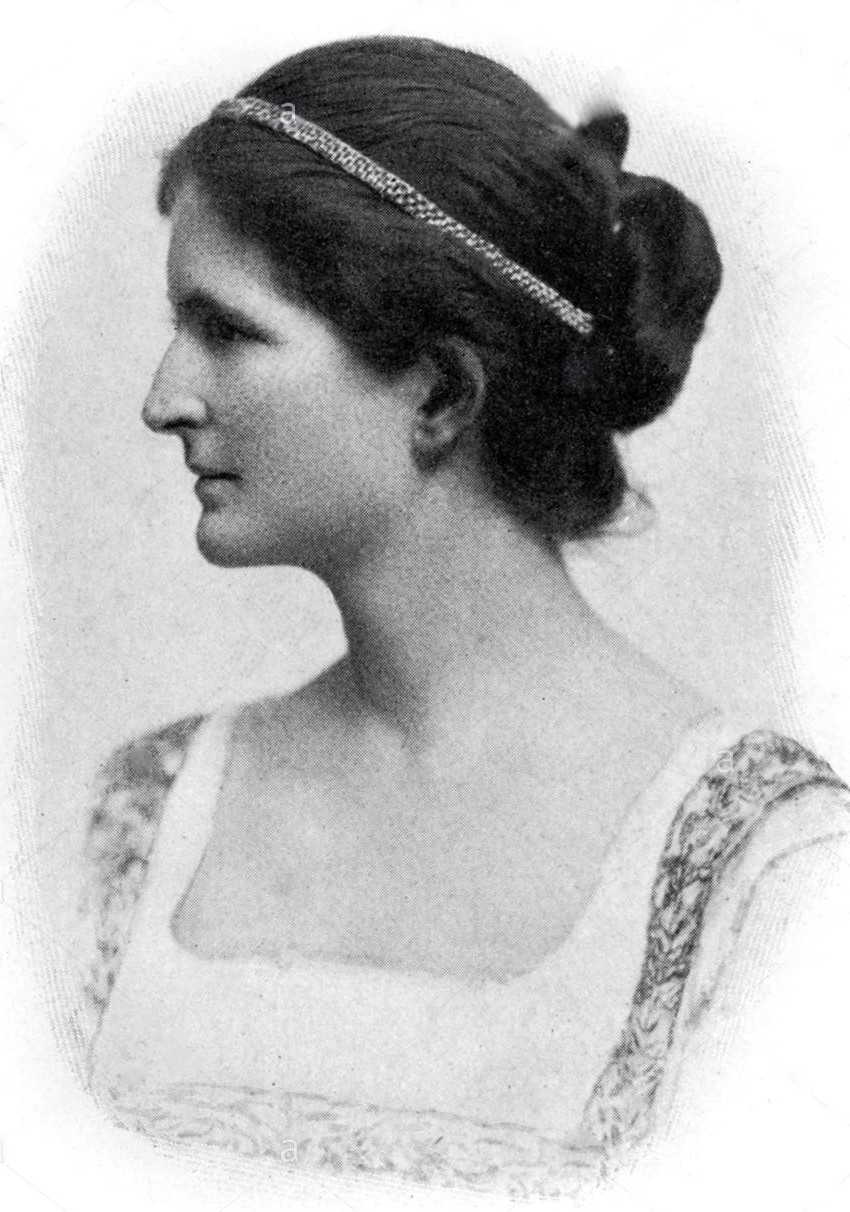
- Born: Jane Lampton Clemens; July 26, 1880; Elmira, New York U.S.
- Died: December 24, 1909 (aged 29); Redding, Connecticut U.S.
- Cause of death: Drowning
- Resting place: Woodlawn Cemetery
- Parent(s): Mark Twain; Olivia Langdon Clemens
- Relatives: Clara Clemens (sister); Susy Clemens (sister)

Jane Lampton "Jean" Clemens (July 26, 1880 – December 24, 1909) was the daughter of Samuel Langhorne Clemens (better known by his pen name Mark Twain) and Olivia Langdon Clemens. She founded or worked with a number of societies for the protection of animals.

== Character and early life ==
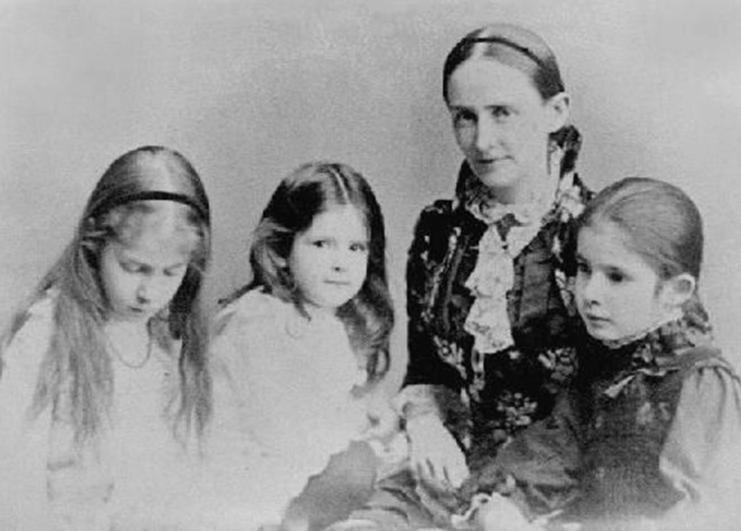
Jean Clemens as a young child with her mother, Olivia Langdon Clemens, and her older sisters, Susy and Clara Clemens.

Jean Clemens was born in Elmira, New York, the youngest of four children born to author and humorist Mark Twain and Olivia Langdon Clemens. Twain wrote from Elmira to his friend, William Dean Howells, reporting she "arrived perfectly sound but with no more baggage than I had when I was on the river," referring to his Life On The Mississippi. According to Mark Twain's Autobiography, Jean was kind-hearted and particularly fond of animals, like Olivia. She founded or worked with a number of societies for the protection of animals in the various locations where she lived.

== Epilepsy ==
Jean had epilepsy from age 16 which Twain attributed to a head injury from when she was age 10 or 11. The family spent years seeking cures in the United States and Europe. Twain also attributed her mood swings and sometimes erratic behavior to her uncontrolled epilepsy.

Jean's mother tried to include her in family life despite her illness, but Olivia died in 1904 and it was left to Twain and Jean's older sister, Clara, to help Jean to manage the difficulties which her illness caused. Twain's secretary Isabel Lyon claimed that Jean physically attacked family maid Katy Leary on two occasions in 1906, saying that she wanted to kill her. In her 2004 biography Dangerous Intimacy: The Untold Story of Mark Twain's Final Years, historian Karen Lystra questions the accuracy of Lyon's account of Jean's violent behavior and suggests that Lyon manipulated a separation between father and daughter because Lyon hoped to marry Twain. Jean was sent to an epilepsy colony in Katonah, New York in the fall of 1906 and despite requesting to return home, Twain refused as he doubted his ability to care for her. Twain fired Lyon and her new husband in 1909, stating that they were guilty of embezzlement, and Jean was able to return home in April 1909. Jean and her father got along well, though she found him stubborn and temperamental.

== Death ==
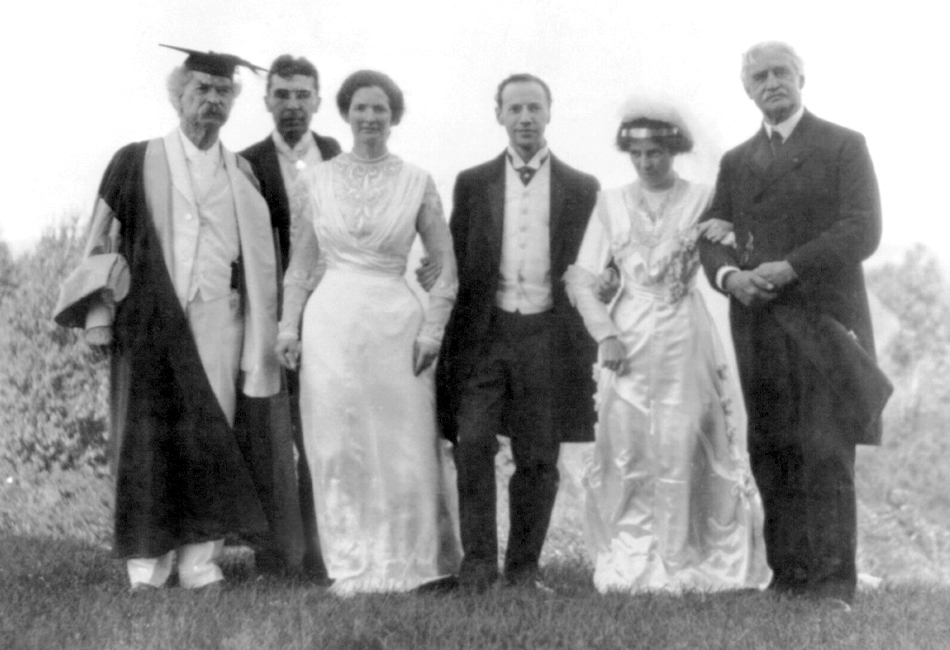
Photograph taken by Frank J. Sprague on October 6, 1909 at the wedding of Clara Clemens and Ossip Gabrilowitsch. From left: Mark Twain, Jervis Langdon Jr., Clara Clemens, Ossip Gabrilowitsch, Jean Clemens, Rev. Dr. Joseph Twichell.

Jean was staying at her father's home Stormfield in Redding, Connecticut in December 1909, and she had decorated the home for the upcoming Christmas holiday. When she had not come down for breakfast a maid found her dead in the bathtub on the morning of December 24, 1909. While it was initially reported she had drowned during a seizure, an investigation showed she had not died directly from drowning but more probably from possibly strangulation due to epilepsy or from heart failure; the body was found in the bathtub only partly submerged and the lungs contained very little water. She was carried to Woodlawn Cemetery in Elmira. Her father did not travel with the casket, unable to bring himself to return to the place where he had already buried two children and his wife. He commemorated her death by having his authorized biographer play her favorite piece of music, Impromptu No. 2 in A-flat major by Schubert. That night he wrote the final entry in his Autobiography, titling it "The Death of Jean." Twain died four months later on April 21, 1910.
