= Stormfield =

Final residence (1908–1910) of Mark Twain in Redding, Connecticut, US

Coordinates: 41.2911°N 73.4011°W

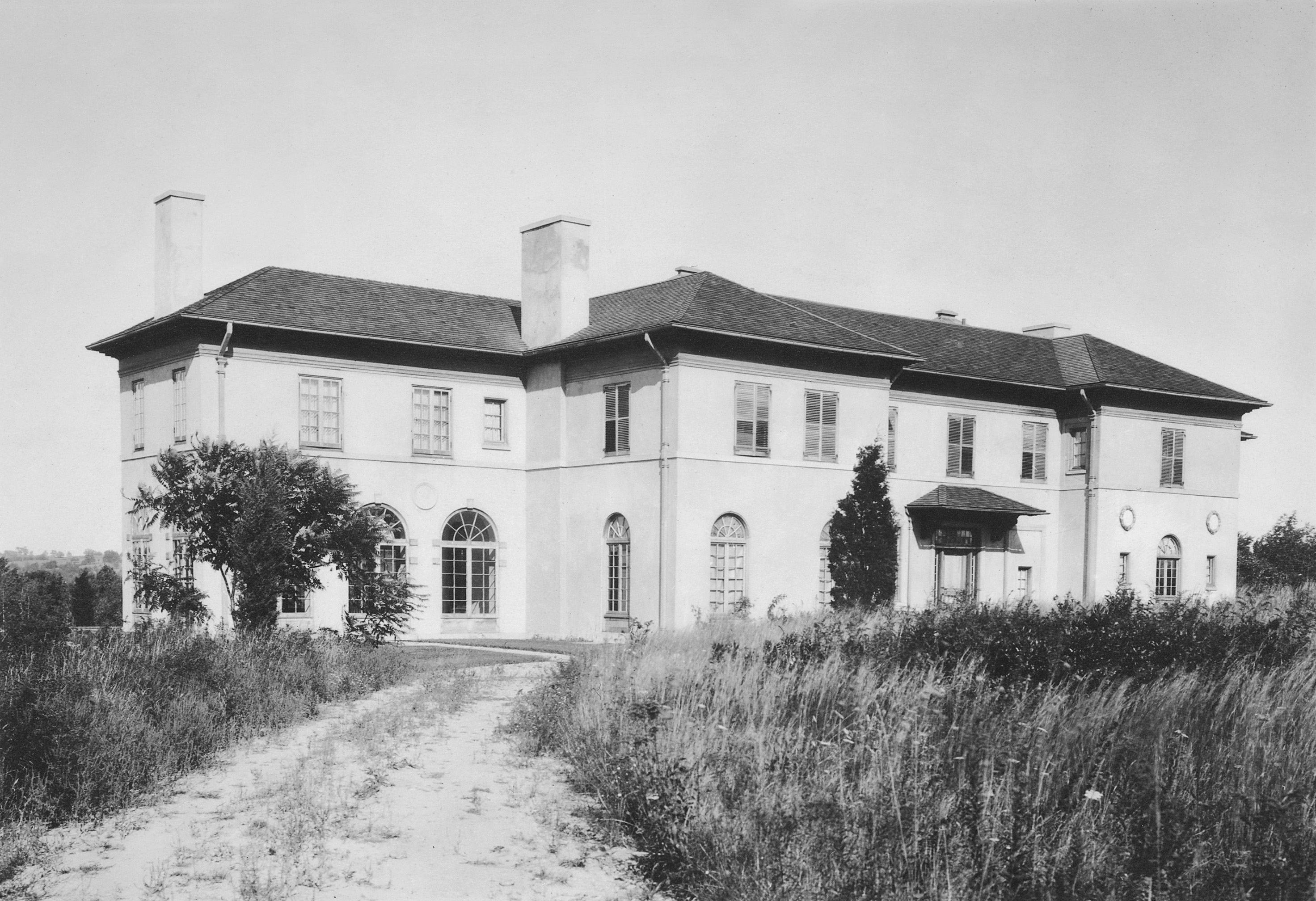
1914 photograph of Stormfield, Mark Twain's home from June 1908 until his death

Stormfield was the mansion built in Redding, Connecticut for author Samuel Clemens, best known by his pen name, Mark Twain, who lived there from 1908 until his death in 1910. He derived the property's name from the short story "Extract from Captain Stormfield's Visit to Heaven". The building was destroyed in a 1923 fire.

== Conception, architecture, and construction ==
Twain met biographer Albert Bigelow Paine in 1906 while living in New York City. He decided to purchase 195 acres of land in Redding where Paine lived, purchasing his first parcel there March 24, 1906, and buying additional acreage in May and September that year.

Twain hired architect John Mead Howells of Howells & Stokes, son of the author William Dean Howells who was a friend and collaborator for 45 years. Twain stipulated the house should be built in the style of a Tuscan villa, after having lived at Villa Viviani (1891–1892) in Settignano and Villa di Quarto (1903–1904) in Sesto Fiorentino outside Florence, Italy. Construction began in 1907; the project was nearly abandoned later that year due to cost and Twain's misgivings about Redding's relative isolation, but the younger Howells convinced him that he would suffer a financial loss on work already underway. The house was completed in June 1908, built on elevated land known at the time as Birch Spray Hill on the west bank of the Saugatuck River.

The exterior of the house featured a gray stucco finish and green-colored roof, with the foundation measuring 70 feet by 40 feet, flanked by wings measuring 20 feet by 18 feet. Howells designed the interior ground floor to include a central dining room, opening onto garden terraces and a fountain. In one wing was a drawing room opening onto an outdoor seating area; the other wing contained a billiards room decorated with caricatures of Twain. The hand-carved mantel for the billiards room fireplace was a gift from the Sandwich Islanders. Twain had purchased a second, ornate mantel from Ayton Castle in Scotland that was installed in the living room; that mantel was damaged in the fire but restored, and is located today at the Mark Twain House & Museum in Hartford, Connecticut where Twain lived from 1874 to 1891.

Residents of Redding met Twain and Paine and Paine's daughter Louise at the West Redding train station on June 18, 1908, and accompanied them to the new house. It was the first time that Twain had seen the house in person. Dan Beard was a nearby Redding resident whose illustrations appeared in several Mark Twain books. He helped set off fireworks to commemorate Twain's arrival, describing a scene in which "sticks from the rockets fell in the pastures and sent the cattle and horses tearing around the fields."

== Life at Stormfield ==
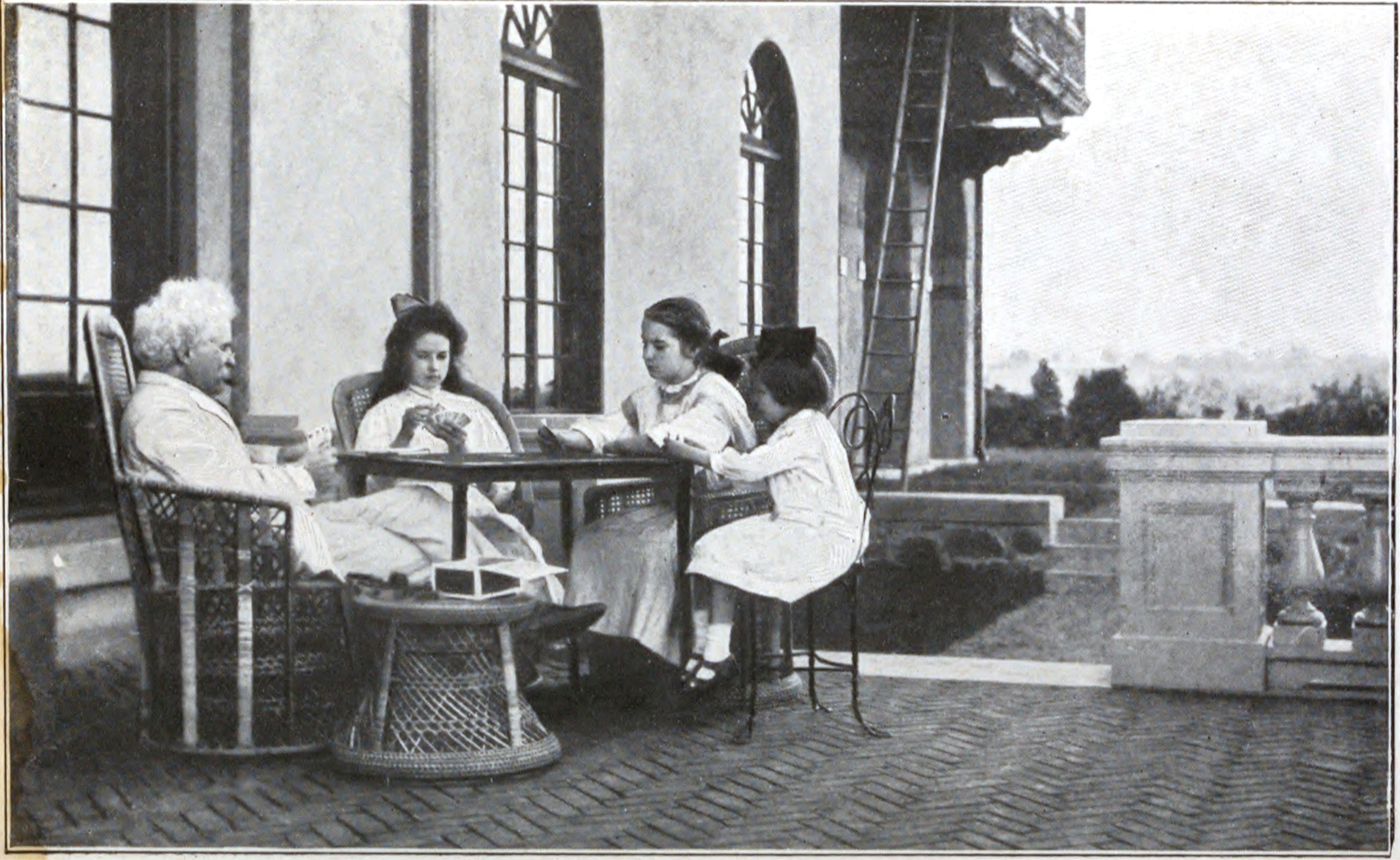
A card game during the first week at Stormfield (June 1908)

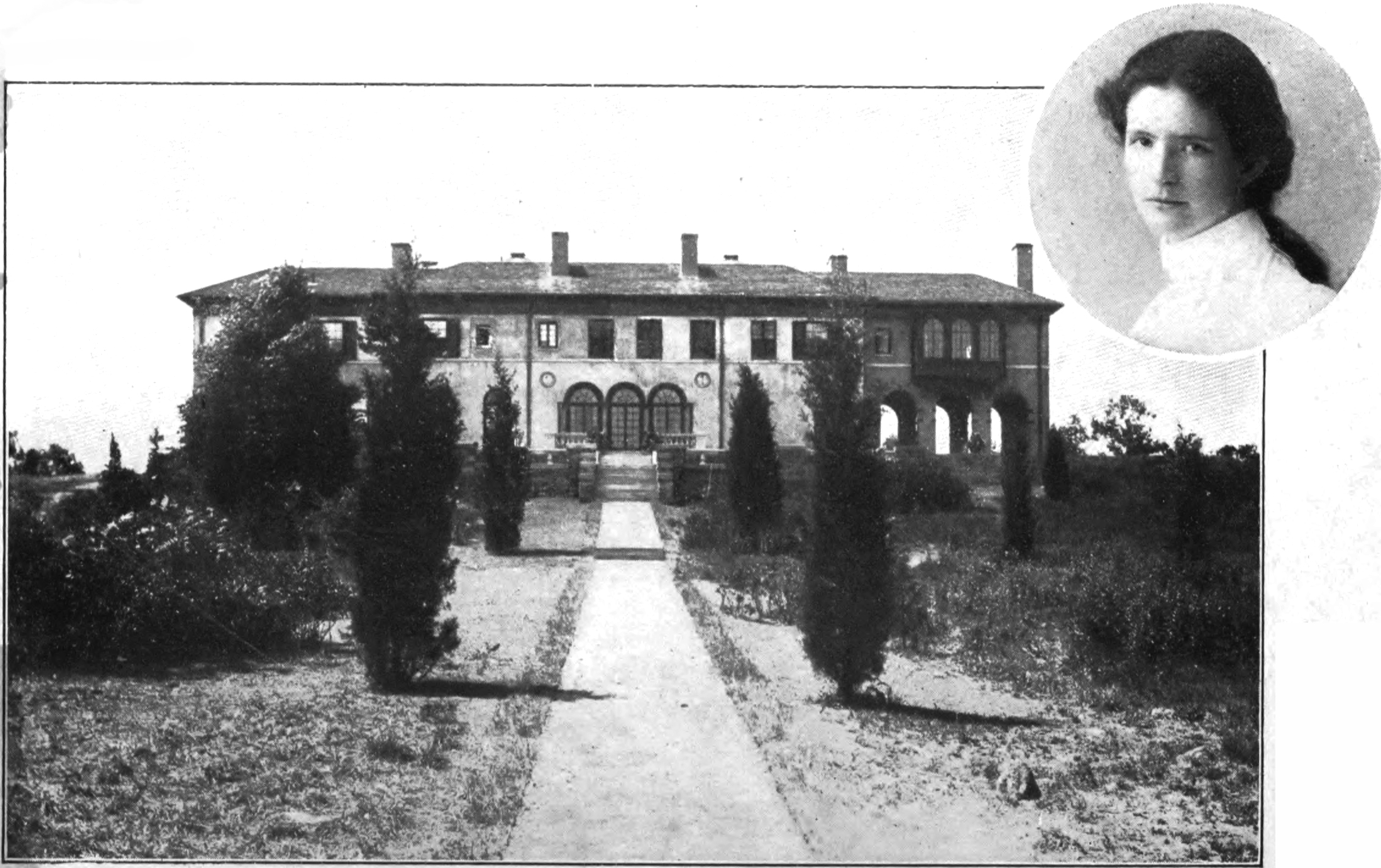
Photograph of Jean Clemens at age 18, and Stormfield

Twain initially called the villa "Autobiography House", and then "Innocents at Home" in reference to his European travel memoir The Innocents Abroad. He changed the name to Stormfield that autumn following a storm which alluded to his short story "Extract from Captain Stormfield's Visit to Heaven" and to the profits from it which he used to finance the construction. Two burglars broke into the house in September 1908 and stole silver; they also exchanged shots with a deputy sheriff who was wounded. They were later apprehended aboard a train in Bethel, Connecticut and sentenced to prison. Twain briefly met the men while they were in custody and subsequently posted a note on the front door of Stormfield addressed "To the next Burglar", advising them that the house contained "nothing but plated ware" which they could find "in that brass thing" by a basket of kittens; to make no noise to disturb the family; and to leave the kittens. He also added an entry in his guest book to note the burglars' arrival "without permission."

In his leisure time at Stormfield, Twain enjoyed playing billiards and the card game hearts, reading, writing, smoking, and strolling the grounds. He hosted numerous famous visitors at Stormfield, including Thomas Edison who filmed the only surviving motion picture of Twain, showing him walking the grounds of Stormfield. Others included Helen Keller, who lived in nearby Easton, Connecticut, and muckraker journalist Ida Tarbell, also an Easton resident. Twain decided to endow a library in Redding, and he began charging visitors one dollar to raise funds for it. As a host, he was "dignified, courteous, and prodigal in his hospitality," Beard wrote, "possessing all of the admirable characteristics of the best type of the old-fashioned Southern gentleman." On October 6, 1909, Clara Clemens married pianist Ossip Gabrilowitsch, in a ceremony held on the grounds of Stormfield. Twain had given a farmhouse on property that he called the Lobster Pot to his secretary, household manager and social companion Isabel Lyon as a Christmas present in 1907. He dismissed her in 1909 and regained ownership of the property.

In 1909 Twain purchased a nearby farm as a home for his daughter Jean, who worked as his secretary after the departure of Isabel Lyon. Jean died at Stormfield December 24, 1909, the cause of death believed to be a heart attack during an epileptic seizure while taking a bath. Clemens wrote "The Death of Jean", believed to be the last work he ever completed.

Twain was suffering from a heart ailment in the spring of 1910 and sought to recuperate in Bermuda. He returned to Stormfield April 12, 1910, and died there April 21.

== Legacy ==
Officials in Connecticut and New York estimated the value of Twain's estate at $471,000 ($11.9 million today). The Gabrilowitschs listed Stormfield for sale in 1910 for $50,000, and the Twain estate sold off several pieces of land between 1910 and 1923.

Clara Clemens Gabrilowitsch gave birth at Stormfield to daughter Nina on August 19, 1910, who was Twain's last descendant; she died in 1966. Clara offered Stormfield for use as a convalescent facility for wounded soldiers and sailors in 1918. Margaret Given bought it and the remaining property in 1923. The mansion caught fire during renovations that year and was destroyed. An exterior garden stone wall is thought to be the lone remaining structure from the original Stormfield.

Mary Millett bought the property in 1924 and built a small replica of Stormfield. She sold the house and property in 1927 to Doreen Danks. That house stands today on property totaling 28.5 acres on Mark Twain Lane in Redding. The town of Redding appraised the property at $1.9 million as of 2017.

== Stormfield Preserve ==
Over the years, the Town of Redding spent some $575,000 to acquire more than 160 acres of the original Stormfield property, which today is maintained as a preserve including 4 miles of hiking trails open to the public. In 1986, a Redding town meeting voted not to commission a study assessing whether to designate the Stormfield area a historic district.
