= Anna Campbell Palmer =

American journalist

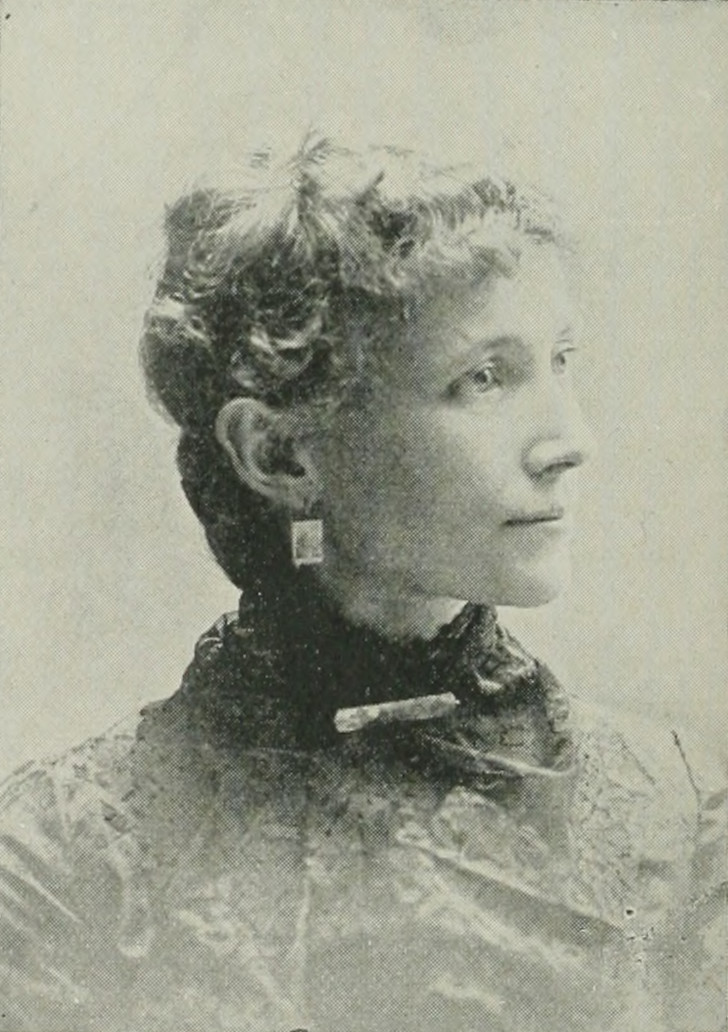
- Photo in A Woman of the Century
- Born: Anna Campbell; February 3, 1854; Elmira, New York, U.S.
- Died: June 18, 1928 (aged 74); Elmira, New York
- Resting place: Woodlawn Cemetery, Elmira, New York
- Occupations: author, editor
- Spouse: George Archibald Palmer (m. 1880; died 1912)
- Children: 2 daughters
- Writing career
- Pen name: "Mrs. George Archibald"
- Genres: poetry, fiction, biography

Anna Campbell Palmer (née, Campbell; pen names, Mrs. George Archibald and Mrs. George Archibald Palmer; February 3, 1854 – June 18, 1928) was an American author and editor. Disliking publicity, she wrote constantly under a great number of nom de plumes, adopting a new one when she began to be identified. Sometimes she had intervals of complete silence, distrustful of her powers and displeased with her efforts. After her marriage, she was known as "Mrs. George Archibald". In 1901, she began to use her full married name, Mrs. George Archibald Palmer, on all her books and articles in periodicals. She wrote a number of poems which appeared in the principal magazines of her day. She was also a successful author of fiction and biography. Palmer served as editor of Young Men's Journal, a YMCA magazine, from 1889 until 1898, at the time being the only woman editor of a young men's journal in the world.

== Early life and education ==
Anna Campbell was born in Elmira, New York, February 3, 1854. Her parents were James Barbour and Sally Peck (Carpenter) Campbell. She was of Scottish and Irish ancestry. All of her several siblings died early in life. She passed her life, except four years of childhood, in Ithaca, New York, in the Chemung River valley. She was an author while still a child. When she was ten years old, she published a poem in The Ithaca Journal, which received the commendation of the editor of that newspaper.

She was educated in the public and private schools in Elmira and Ithaca, including the Lancasterian School of Ithaca and Miss Guile's Seminary.

In 1868, at the age of fourteen, she was left an orphan. Her mother's last words to her were: "Be a good girl."

== Career ==
In 1870, Palmer became a teacher at School No. Two, in the Elmira public schools. She taught successfully for a number of years. On September 28, 1880, in Elmira, she married George Archibald Palmer (d. 1912), a singer, cornet player, and choir director, active in Sunday School work.

Palmer held an editorial position on the Elmira Advertiser, and was a member of the editorial staff of the Elmira Evening Star, 1895–99. She was a correspondent to Buffalo Express, and on the staff of the Elmira Advertiser, 1901. She served as editor of Young Men's Journal (Y. M. C. A. magazine), and Key-Note, a musical and social magazine. She did a large amount of work for newspapers of all sorts, and contributed to: Judge, The Youth's Companion, Harper's Bazar, Ladies' Home Journal, Delineator, and other publications. She published "Which Was the Progressive Woman?" serial in Northern Christian Advocate. Some of her best work appeared in the Magazine of Poetry.

Her published works included The Summerville Prize (New York, 1890), a book for girls; A Little Brown Seed (New York, 1891); Lady Gay (Boston, 1891); Lady Gay and Her Sister (Chicago, 1892); A Dozen Good Times (1893); Three Times Three (in collaboration); Joel Dorman Steele (biography, 1900); and Verses from a Mother's Corner (Elmira, N. Y.).

Palmer's musical compositions included the text for :Life's sunny day; a service for children's day (music was by E. S. Lorenz and Charles H. Gabriel); Of course (1911, music composed by her daughter, Georgianna Palmer); and A Christmas berry gathering; a Christmas cantata for children (1906, libretto by Palmer, music by Ira B. Wilson).

== Personal life ==
Mr. and Mrs. Palmer had two daughters, Georgianna (d. 1968) and Sally (d. 1926).

In religion, Palmer affiliated with the Methodist Episcopal Church. She was allied to various clubs and philanthropies in Elmira, where she made her residence. She served on the Press and Publicity Committee of the New York State Board of Charities, and was the General Secretary of Literature of the Woman's Foreign Missionary Society of the Methodist Episcopal Church.

Palmer died on June 18, 1928, after an extended illness. Her writings and correspondence are held by the Chemung County Historical Society.

== Selected works ==
=== Poetry ===
- Verses from a Mother's Corner (1889)

=== Prose ===
- The Summerville Prize (1890)
- A Little Brown Seed (1891)
- Lady Gay; the story of a little girl and her friends (1891)
- Lady Gay and Her Sister (1892)
- A Dozen Good Times (1893)
- Lady Gay (1898)

=== Biographies ===
- Joel Dorman Steele, teacher and author (1900)

=== Chapters in books ===
- "A Surprise Visit", in Three Times Three (1899)

=== Musical compositions ===
- Life's sunny day; a service for children's day
- A Christmas berry gathering; a Christmas cantata for children (1906)
- Of course (1911)
