= Susy Clemens =

Eldest daughter of Mark Twain (1872–1896)

- Clemens as a young teenager, c. 1885
- Born: Olivia Susan Clemens; March 19, 1872; Elmira, New York, U.S.
- Died: August 18, 1896 (aged 24); Hartford, Connecticut, U.S.
- Resting place: Woodlawn Cemetery
- Education: Bryn Mawr College
- Occupations: Writer, literary critic
- Parent(s): Mark Twain; Olivia Langdon Clemens
- Relatives: Clara Clemens (sister); Jean Clemens (sister)

Olivia Susan Clemens (March 19, 1872 – August 18, 1896) was the second child and eldest daughter of Samuel Clemens, who wrote under the pen name Mark Twain, and his wife Olivia Langdon Clemens. She inspired some of her father's works, at 13 wrote her own biography of him, which he later published in his autobiography, and acted as a literary critic. Her father was heartbroken when she died of spinal meningitis at age 24.

Her biography of her father was published in 1988 in its entirety as Papa: An Intimate Biography of Mark Twain, a volume which also included a biography of Susy Clemens and her correspondence with her father.

== Life ==
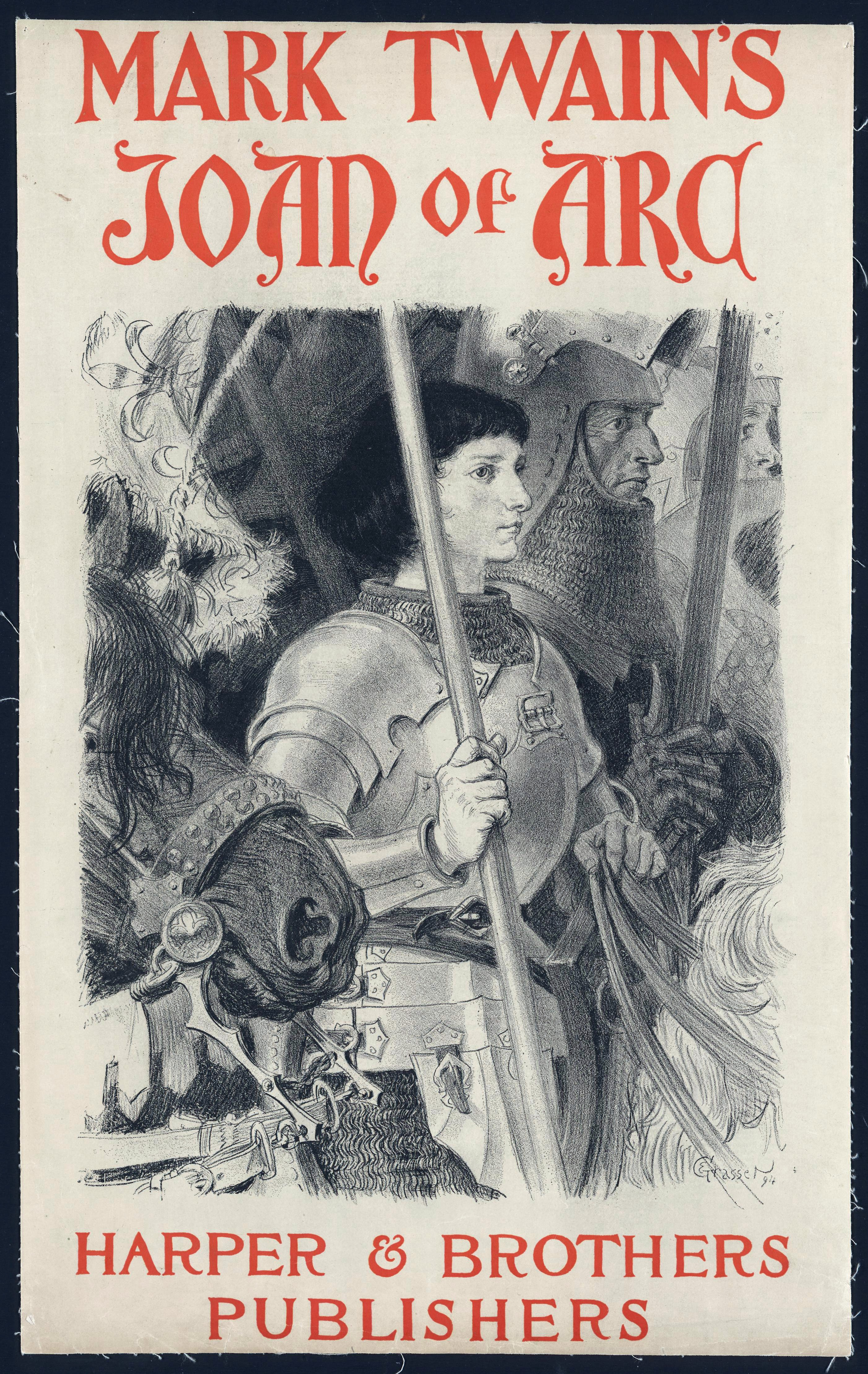
Susy Clemens was the inspiration for the character of Joan of Arc in her father's novel Personal Recollections of Joan of Arc.

Born in Elmira, New York, Clemens was largely raised in Hartford, Connecticut, but went abroad with her family to England in 1873 and again in 1878–79. At age 13, she wrote a biography of her father that Twain later included in his Chapters from my Autobiography. The biography described her impressions of her father and her happy family life. Her father wrote: "I had had compliments before, but none that touched me like this; none that could approach it for value in my eyes." Like her father, she was interested in writing, and wrote her own plays and acted in them during her childhood and adolescence. Twain later described his favorite daughter as intelligent, thoughtful, sensitive and vivacious and said he had regarded her as a prodigy. "She was a magazine of feelings and they were of all kinds and of all shades of force; she was so volatile, as a little child, that sometimes the whole battery came into play in the short compass of a day," he wrote after her death. "She was full of life, full of activity, full of fire, her waking hours were a crowding and hurrying procession of enthusiasms ... Joy, sorrow, anger, remorse, storm, sunshine, rain, darkness – they were all there: They came in a moment and they were gone as quickly. In all things she was intense: in her this characteristic was not a mere glow, dispensing warmth, but a consuming fire." He based the character of Joan of Arc in his book Personal Recollections of Joan of Arc on his eldest daughter as he remembered her at age seventeen.

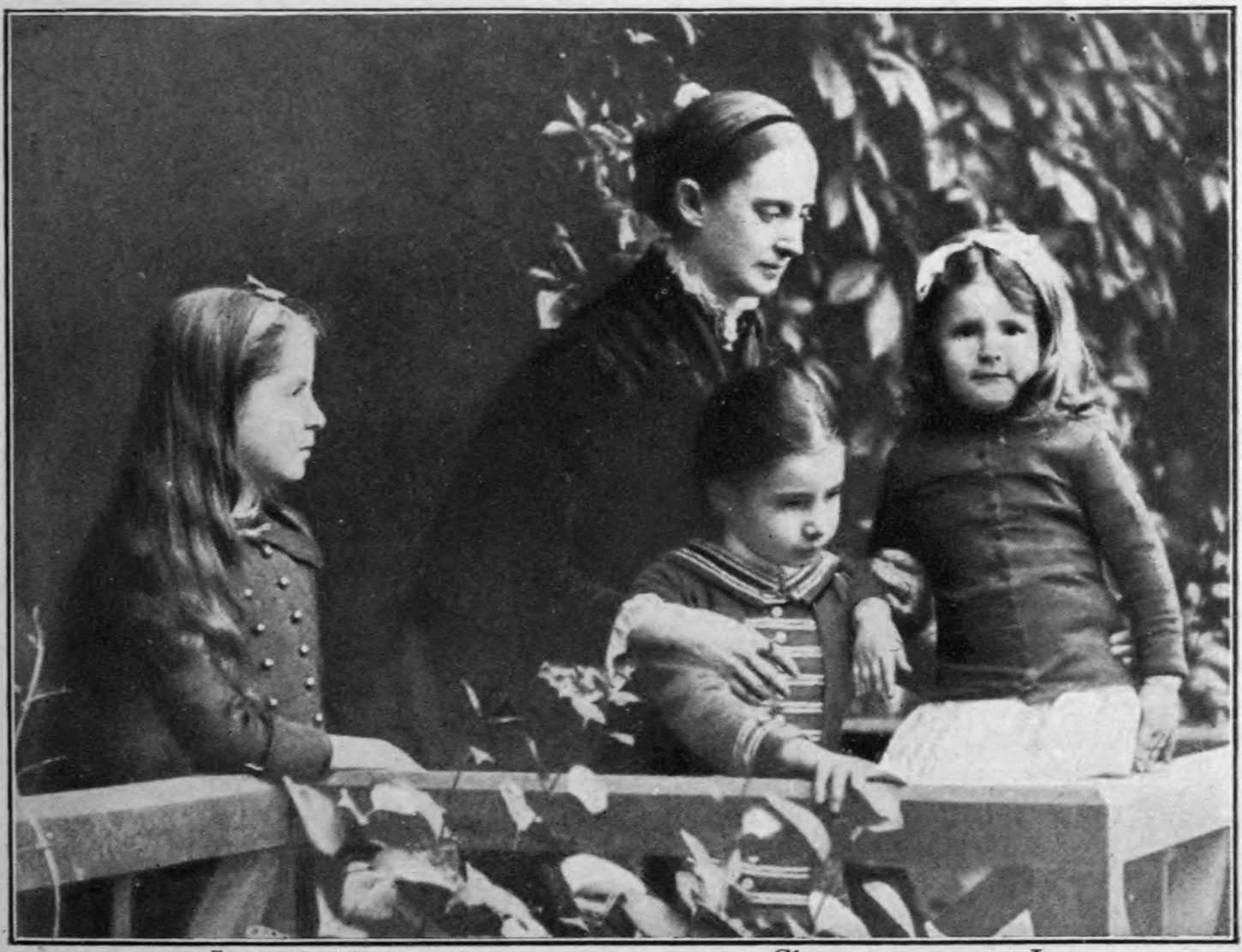
Susy Clemens, left, with her mother, Olivia Langdon Clemens, and younger sisters Clara and Jean in 1884.

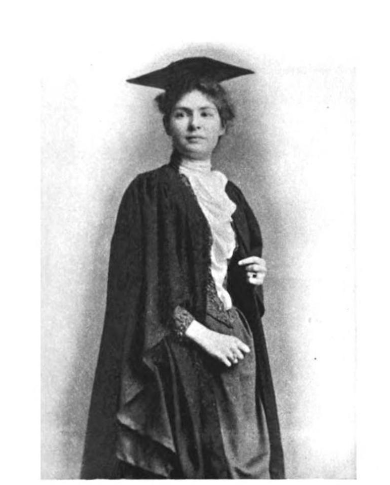
Susy Clemens at Bryn Mawr in 1890–91

In the fall of 1890, Clemens attended Bryn Mawr College, where she was given the starring role of Phyllis in the play Iolanthe, began calling herself by her real first name "Olivia" and developed a close friendship with fellow student Louise Brownell that some biographers have speculated may have been romantic in nature. Clemens left the college after one semester, possibly because of her family's financial difficulties, because she found the studies too difficult, or because of her relationship with Brownell.

As she grew older, she became frustrated with her father's fame, which sometimes left her in the shadows. She was annoyed by her father's reputation as a "mere humorist" and felt he should represent himself as a serious writer instead of just as a funny man. She was embarrassed when Twain performed the ghost story The Golden Arm for an audience at Bryn Mawr. She had begged him not to tell the story, thinking it too unsophisticated for her worldly classmates, and ran out of the hall crying when her father told the story anyway. She later accompanied her family abroad and attended schools in Geneva and Berlin, where she took language and voice lessons, though she was disappointed when her voice teacher, Mathilde Marchesi, told her she had a lovely soprano voice but did not have the strength or stamina for grand opera. Marchesi observed that Clemens was anemic, sleep-deprived, and anorexic. She had Clemens stop singing lessons for the time being and encouraged her to restore her health first. She recommended hydrotherapy and proper diet and exercise, while Twain thought Susy might also be helped by hypnotism. However, she was never able to acquire enough lung capacity to project her voice from the stage. In Europe she was at loose ends, bored by her family's evenings at home and annoyed by her father's frequent temperamental outbursts. She wrote to her friend Brownell that she sometimes had trouble finding a reason for existence. She was also frustrated by society's refusal to see her as anything other than the daughter of Mark Twain. In Florence, the then nineteen-year-old Clemens became infatuated with a married Italian count. Her physical and mental health suffered, and she again sought cures ranging from hydrotherapy to "mind cures". She felt she was helped by Mental Science, a less structured version of Christian Science, and to some extent by Spiritualism.

== Death ==
Clemens chose not to accompany the family to Europe on Twain's lecture tour of 1895–1896, citing seasickness and a desire to recover her health and become an opera singer. She stayed in Elmira, at the home of her aunt Susan Crane. In August 1896, while visiting her former home in Hartford, Clemens developed a fever that turned into spinal meningitis. Clemens was moved to her family home, and stayed in her parents' mahogany bed, which had detachable angels on each post, a bed that she and her sisters had fond memories of playing with as children. Katy Leary, the family's Irish maid, took care of her, sleeping on a sofa in the room. Clemens developed delirium, at one point clutching an article of her mother's clothing and crying because she thought her mother had died, and at another looking out the windows at the traffic and singing, "Up go the trolley cars for Mark Twain's daughter. Down go the trolley cars for Mark Twain's daughter." She spent several days writing a 47-page prose poem partially addressed to the opera singer Maria Malibran, whom she had taken as a kind of role model. Eventually she lost her sight and lapsed into a coma. On August 18, 1896, she died at age twenty-four. Her family was devastated.

Clemens was buried in Woodlawn Cemetery in Elmira. The poem on her headstone was an adapted extract from an 1893 poem, Annette, by Australian poet Robert Richardson:

Warm summer sun
shine kindly here,
Warm southern wind
blow softly here,
Green sod above
lie light, lie light –
Good night, dear heart
Good night, good night.

— Robert Richardson, Annette

== Popular culture ==
A children's book, The Extraordinary Mark Twain (According to Susy), features excerpts of Susy's biography of her father with smaller journal-style pages inserted between the main pages.

Mark Twain: Words & Music is a double-CD that tells the life story of Samuel Clemens in spoken word and song and features segments about his family. The project was produced by Carl Jackson as a benefit for the Mark Twain Boyhood Home & Museum. The story line was written by Cindy Lovell and is narrated by Garrison Keillor with Clint Eastwood performing as Twain and Angela Lovell performing as Susy.

== Sources ==
- Clemens, Susy (1988). Papa: An Intimate Biography of Mark Twain. Doubleday Books. ISBN 0-385-23245-4.
- Kerley, Barbara (2010). The Extraordinary Mark Twain (According to Susy). Scholastic Press. ISBN 978-0545125086.
- Lovell, Cindy (2011). Mark Twain: Words & Music. Mailboat Records. ASIN B005MR4P6Q.
- Lystra, Karen (2004). Dangerous Intimacy: The Untold Story of Mark Twain's Final Years. University of California Press Ltd. ISBN 0-520-23323-9.
- Paine, Albert Bigelow (1912). Mark Twain: A Biography. Harper & Bros.
- Pilkington, Ed (April 21, 2010). "Mark Twain manuscript reveals author's pain at losing his daughter". theguardian.com.
- Rushmore, Robert (1971). The Singing Voice. Dodd, Mead.
- Ward, Geoffrey C.; Duncan, Dayton; Burns, Ken (2001). Mark Twain: An Illustrated Biography. Alfred A. Knopf. ISBN 0-375-40561-5.
