= Autobiography of Mark Twain =

Collection of reminiscences by Mark Twain

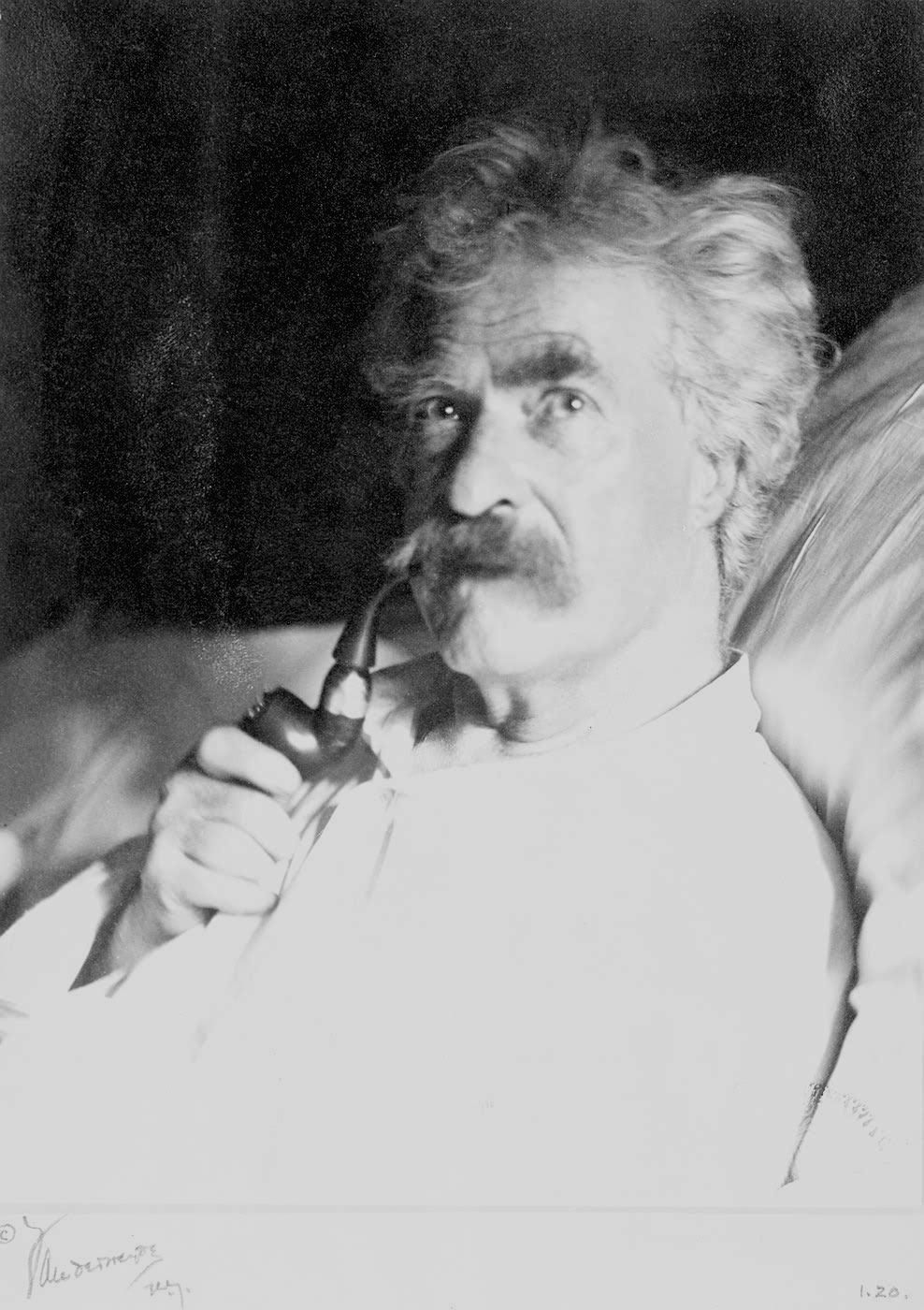
Twain circa 1906. The majority of the Autobiography was composed during this time period.

The Autobiography of Mark Twain is a written collection of reminiscences, the majority of which were dictated during the last few years of the life of the American author Mark Twain (1835–1910) and left in typescript and manuscript at his death. The Autobiography comprises a collection of anecdotes and ruminations rather than a conventional autobiography. Twain never compiled the writings and dictations into a publishable form in his lifetime. Despite indications from Twain that he did not want his autobiography to be published for a century, he serialized selected chapters during his lifetime; in addition, various compilations were published during the 20th century. However, it was not until 2010 that the first volume of a comprehensive three-volume collection, compiled and edited by The Mark Twain Project of the Bancroft Library at University of California, Berkeley, was published.

== Twain's writings and dictations ==
Twain started the composition of an autobiography in 1870, but proceeded intermittently, abandoning the work and resuming it sporadically, accumulating a total of 30-40 of these “false starts” over the subsequent 35 years.

The majority of the autobiography was dictated rather than written directly—this was described by a reviewer in 2010 as "[having] a secretary follow him around and take down his every passing thought". In a 1904 letter to William Dean Howells, Twain wrote, "I’ve struck it! And I will give it away—to you. You will never know how much enjoyment you have lost until you get to dictating your autobiography." These dictations were made frequently in 1906 and 1907. Over the two subsequent years, Twain appeared to have neglected the book, scarcely adding new material; in 1909, following the death of his youngest daughter, Jean Clemens, he proclaimed the project completed. His experimental conception—to “talk only about the thing which interests you for the moment”—implied that his thoughts could wander freely. Twain surmised his autobiography would be most captivating if he deviated on whims and tangents in non-sequential order.

Twain's papers, including the autobiographical works, were left as part of a trust for the benefit of his surviving daughter, Clara Clemens. These papers passed through the control of a number of editors, and have been held by the Bancroft Library at the University of California, Berkeley since 1971.

=== Plans for posthumous publication ===
Twain intended for the majority of the material to be published posthumously. In an interview for The Times in 1899, Twain was reported to be considering a work which would be unpublished for a century.

Twain wrote instructions for future "editors, heirs, and assigns" in 1904, in which he outlined a century-long plan of publications 25 years apart from each other, with each subsequent release featuring progressively potentially-controversial material. In addition to these instructions, Twain celebrated posthumous publication allowing him to speak with his "whole frank mind." In the introduction to the second edition of Mark Twain's Own Autobiography: The Chapters from the North American Review, however, scholar Michael Kiskis suggests that these delays were less due to Twain's purported concern for those who could be aggrieved by the text, and more likely an attempt to extend the copyright.

Various modern reports refer to a "100 year embargo", imposed by Twain on his own autobiography's release, which expired in 2010.

== 20th-century publications ==
1924 edition

Twain had published Chapters from My Autobiography in 25 installments in the North American Review from 1906 to 1907. Since Twain’s death in 1910, various editors have attempted to impose order on the entirety of the material by selection and reorganization, producing several different published versions of The Autobiography. Constructing a publishable Autobiography from the disordered mass of Twain’s unpublished writings posed a significant challenge; in addition, access to the physical materials of Twain’s papers was restricted to limited numbers of scholars for the first half-century after Twain's death.

The partial Autobiography was published in 1924 by Harper & Brothers, consisting of approximately two-fifths of the material. It was compiled by personal friend and literary executor Albert Bigelow Paine, who at the time had exclusive access to Twain's papers.

Editor and historian Bernard DeVoto succeeded Paine as literary executor for the Clemens estate and used his access to the material to produce a book collection of Autobiography material: Mark Twain in Eruption (1940), containing only passages Paine had not previously used and arranging them topically. In 1959 Charles Neider rejected both Paine's chronological-composition compilation and DeVoto's topic-organized compilation, re-arranging material to match the chronology of a standard autobiography and adding thirty thousand words in the process: The Autobiography of Mark Twain, Including Chapters Now Published for the First Time (1959). In 1990, scholar Michael Kiskis edited Mark Twain’s Own Autobiography: The Chapters from the North American Review.

== Mark Twain Project edition ==
Volume 1 of The Mark Twain Project edition

The Mark Twain Project of The Bancroft Library undertook to produce a complete autobiography of Twain, based upon material within their collection. The stated goal was "to publish the complete text as nearly as possible in the way Mark Twain intended it to be published after his death". This was published in three volumes between 2010 and 2015, with the first installment being released on the 100th anniversary year of Twain's death. All three volumes feature introductions and historical annotation from the editors of the work. The head editor for this work was Harriet Elinor Smith.

The first of the three volumes in the edition comprises 760 pages. Apart from the transcripts of his autobiographical dictations, Volume 1 also contains introductory material that elucidates the process of the autobiography's composition, in addition to primary documents such as Twain’s initial [incomplete] drafts. The dictations span a period of three months, from January 10 to March 13, in the year 1906.

The second volume, published in October 2013, comprises 736 pages and collects dictations spanning eleven months, from April 2, 1906, to February 28, 1907.

The Mark Twain Project edition’s third and final volume comprises 792 pages, and was published in October 2015. It contains dictations spanning thirty-one months, from March 1, 1907, to October 21, 1909. The autobiography concludes with a piece composed in December 1909 in which Twain expresses his sorrow over the death of his youngest daughter and states that, along with her, his incentive for writing the autobiography has perished.

The third volume is followed by the 429-page “Ashcroft-Lyon Manuscript”, composed in 1909, in which Twain accuses his secretary, Isabel Lyon, and business manager, Ralph Ashcroft, of purported embezzlement of money from the author and of interference with Twain’s relationship with his youngest daughter, causing her distress. It is written as a letter to William Dean Howells, although it was neither sent nor intended to be so. It was not Twain’s intention to incorporate this as part of his autobiography, and it remained unpublished until 2015—though it was accessible to scholars as part of his papers. The 21st-century editors deemed it sufficiently significant to include within the publication.

=== Copyright status ===
The 2010 edition, which reflects Twain’s attempts from 1906 and earlier, would have entered the public domain by 2023 under standard circumstances. The Copyright Act of 1976 determined that unpublished works created before January 1, 1978 would have entered the public domain by 2003; nevertheless, the publishers, the Mark Twain Foundation and the University of California Press, surreptitiously published the 2010 edition on microfilm in 2001, selling all three forthcoming volumes for $50,000. As a result, the 2010 edition carries copyright marks for 2001 and 2010, and will not enter the public domain until 2047. David Bollier criticized the Mark Twain Foundation and the University of California Press for this action, stating, "So is the argument that academic presses have a special entitlement to game the usual terms of copyright law because they are doing God's work as academic presses? Copyright industries frequently inveigh against the 'theft' of sharing copyrighted works online, solemnly intoning that 'the law is the law.' So is a theft not a theft when the victim is the public, and not a private copyright holder?".
