= Paul Delaunay =

French physician and historian (1878–1958)

Paul-Marie Delaunay (16 February 1878, Mayenne – 3 February 1958) was a French physician and historian. During World War I, he served as a medical officer. Following the war, he returned to practicing medicine in Le Mans. He made significant contributions to the history of medicine.
