= Clara Clemens =

American; daughter of Mark Twain; opera singer (1874–1962)

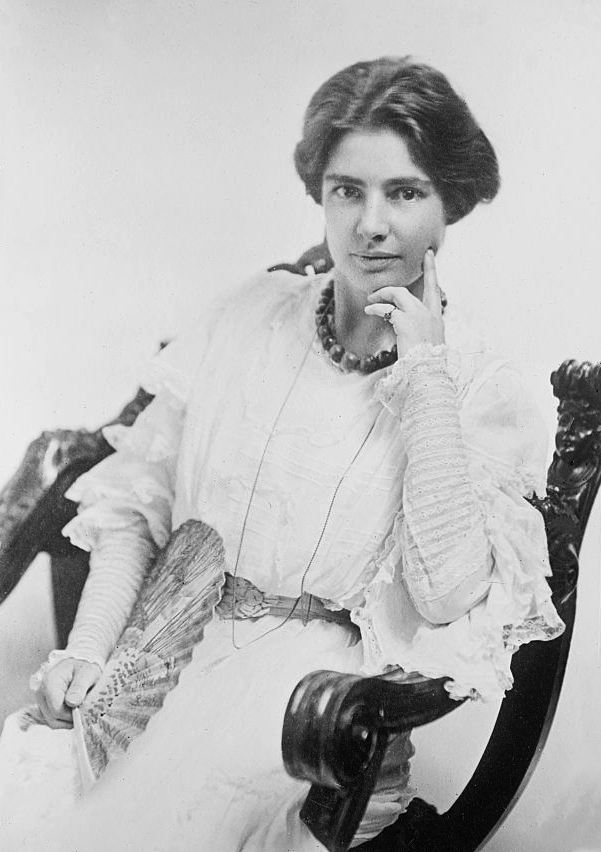
- Clemens c. 1907

Background information
- Born: Clara Langhorne Clemens; June 8, 1874; Elmira, New York, U.S.
- Died: November 19, 1962 (aged 88) San Diego, California, U.S.
- Genre: Concert singer
- Instrument: Piano
- Years active: 1906–1908
- Spouses: Ossip Gabrilowitsch (m. 1909; died 1936); Jacques Samossoud (m. 1944)

Clara Langhorne Clemens Samossoud (formerly Gabrilowitsch; June 8, 1874 – November 19, 1962), was an American concert singer, and the daughter of Samuel Clemens, who wrote as Mark Twain. She managed his estate and guarded his legacy after his death as his only surviving child. She was married first to Ossip Gabrilowitsch, then to Jacques Samossoud after Gabrilowitsch's death. She wrote biographies of Gabrilowitsch and of her father. In her later life, she became a Christian Scientist.

== Family and childhood ==
Clara was the second of three daughters born to Samuel Clemens and his wife Olivia Langdon Clemens in Elmira, New York. Her older sister Susy died when Clara was 22. Her brother Langdon died as an infant before she was born. Her younger sister was Jean who suffered from epilepsy. Clara had a serious accident as a child while riding a toboggan; she was hurled into a tree, resulting in a severe leg injury that almost led to amputation.

== Early career ==
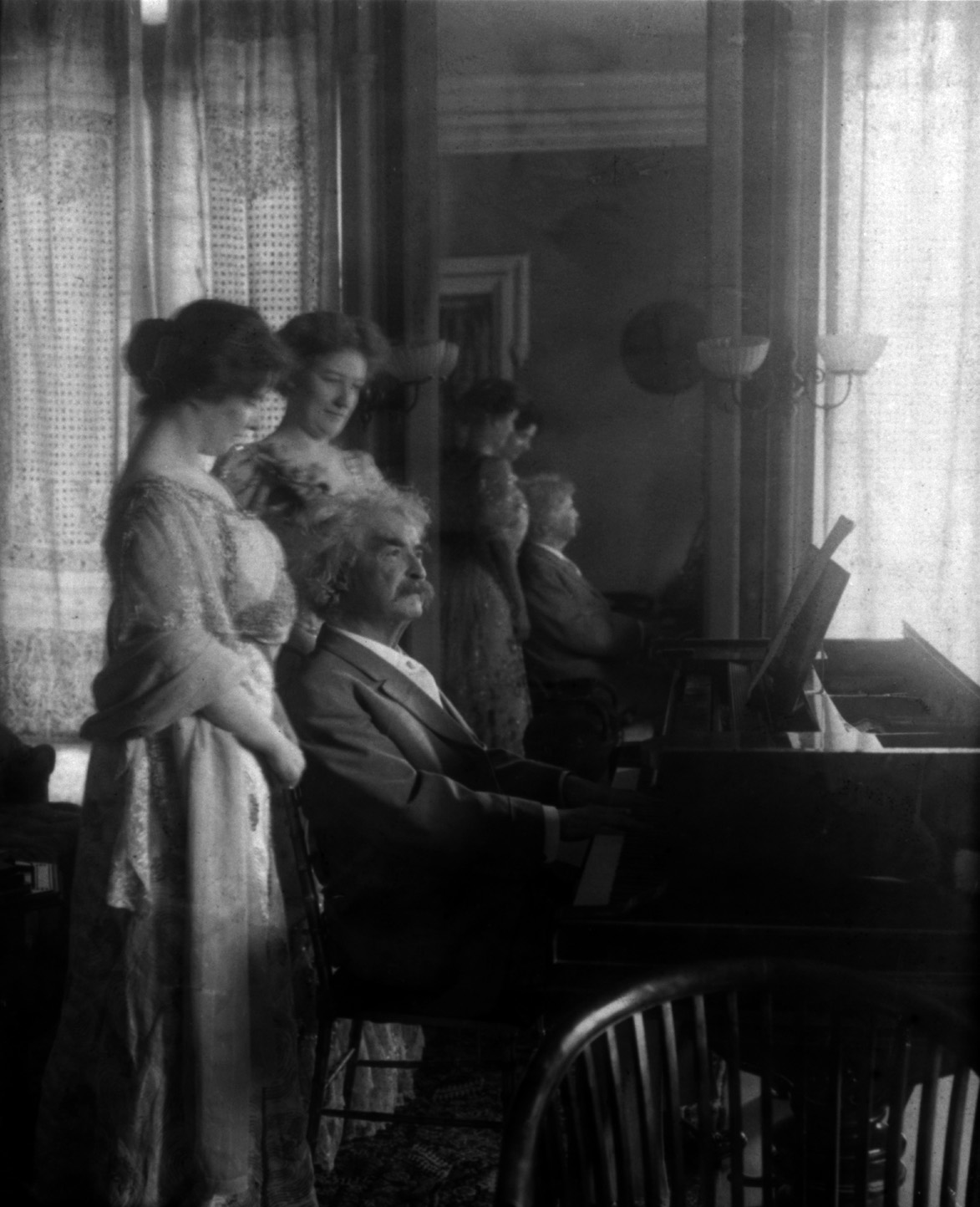
Twain playing the piano, with his daughter Clara and her friend behind him

Clara lived in Vienna with her parents from September 1897 to May 1899 where she cultivated her voice for the concert stage. Contemporaries characterized her voice as unusually sweet and attractive. She also studied piano in 1899 under Theodor Leschetizky, who had been a pupil of Carl Czerny. In December 1900, she was invited by the people of Hartford to perform at a grand concert given by the Boston Symphony Orchestra. She studied for several years under masters in Europe before making her professional debut in Florence. One of her voice teachers was Giorgio M. Sulli.

Clemens made her American debut as a contralto concert singer on the evening of September 22, 1906, at the Norfolk Gymnasium in Norfolk, Connecticut, assisted by violinist Marie Nichols. She rented Edgewood there in 1905, and she used the proceeds from the concert to purchase a memorial window for her mother in the Norfolk Church of the Transfiguration. Charles Edmund Wark (1876-1954) was a classical pianist from Cobourg, Ontario, and he became Clemens' piano accompanist from the winter of 1906 to late in 1908. Clemens and Nichols also continued to perform together, including a series of concerts in London and Paris in 1908. On May 30, Clemens debuted in London at a benefit concert, raising money for American girls to attend Oxford and Cambridge Universities.

== Marriage and inheritance ==
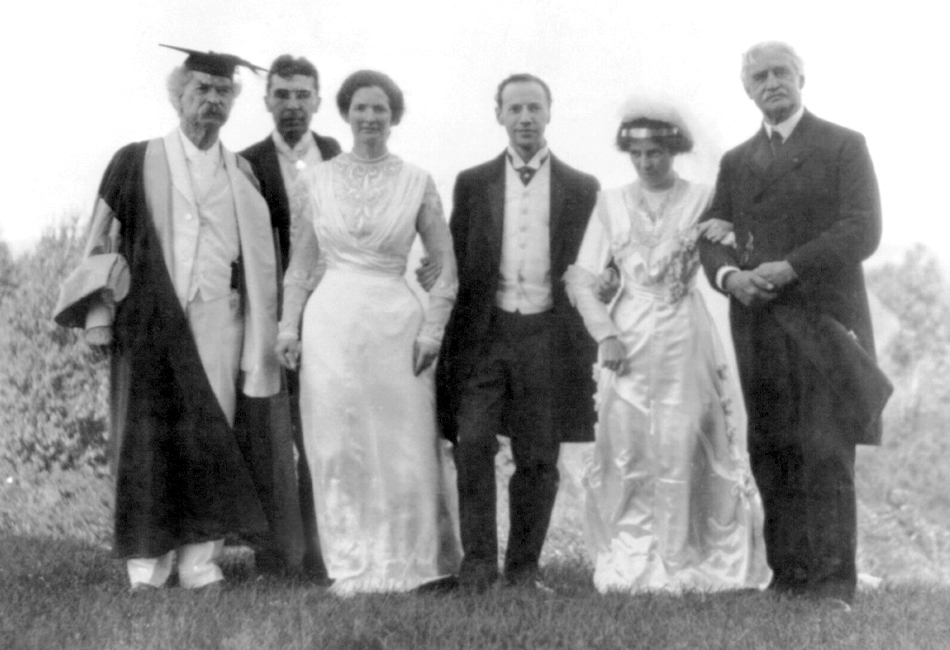
Photograph taken by Frank J. Sprague at the wedding of Clemens and Ossip Gabrilowitsch. From left: Mark Twain, Jervis Langdon Jr., Clara Clemens , Ossip Gabrilowitsch, Jean Clemens, Joseph Twichell.

Clemens went for a sleigh ride on December 20, 1908, with Russian concert pianist Ossip Gabrilowitsch who was staying with her father at his residence "Innocents at Home" in Redding, Connecticut. The horse was frightened by a flapping newspaper and it bolted, causing Gabrilowitsch to lose control. The sleigh overturned at the top of a hill near a 50-foot (15 m) drop, throwing Clemens out. Gabrilowitsch saved both her and the horse from plunging over the edge, spraining an ankle in his exertions. He returned Clemens home unharmed except for the shock of the accident. Twain biographer Michael Shelden doubts the truth of this heroic tale and suggests that the story was planted in the press to quiet rumors that Clara was having an affair with Charles Wark, her former accompanist and a married man.

Theodor Leschetizky was training Gabrilowitsch in Vienna in 1899, and he introduced him to Clemens. They were married on October 6, 1909, in the drawing room at Stormfield, the Clemens home, with her father's friend Rev. Joseph Twichell presiding. Her father said that the engagement was not new, having been "made and dissolved twice six years ago". He also said that the marriage was sudden because Gabrilowitsch had just recovered from a surgical operation which he had undergone in the summer and they were about to head off to their new house in Berlin where he would begin his European season.

Samuel Clemens died on April 21, 1910, leaving his estate to be equally divided between his surviving daughters in a will dated August 17, 1909. However, his youngest daughter Jean Clemens died in the bathtub on December 24, 1909, after having an epileptic seizure. Clara inherited the entire estate, which provided quarterly payments of interest to keep it "free from any control or interference from any husband she may have." On July 9, Clara announced that she was donating her father's library of nearly 2,500 books to the Mark Twain Free Library.

On August 19, 1910, Clara's only child Nina was born at Stormfield. Nina Gabrilowitsch (1910–1966) was Twain's last descendant, and she died January 16, 1966, in a Los Angeles hotel. She had been a heavy drinker, and bottles of pills and alcohol were found in her room.

== Later life ==
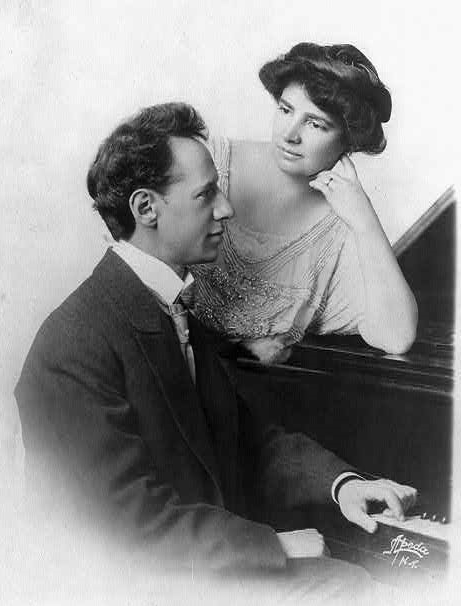
Clara Clemens with her husband Ossip Gabrilowitsch

On April 23, 1926, Clara played the title role in a dramatization of Twain's 1896 novel Personal Recollections of Joan of Arc at Walter Hampden's Broadway theater. This adaptation and her performance were not very well received by critics.

It was again produced in 1927, opening on April 12 for a series of special morning and afternoon performances at the Edyth Totten Theatre.

Gabrilowitsch was conductor of the Detroit Symphony Orchestra from 1918 until 1935, when he fell ill. He entered the Henry Ford Hospital on March 25, 1935, where he stayed until he was released to his home to convalesce on September 28, 1935. He died at home on September 14, 1936, age 58. Clara married Jacques Samossoud on May 11, 1944, a Russian-born symphony conductor 20 years her junior. They were married in her Hollywood home.

Clara explored eastern religions for several years before embracing Christian Science, but there are questions as to her seriousness and commitment to it. She wrote Awake to a Perfect Day on the subject, published in 1956. She also published biographies of her father (My Father, Mark Twain in 1931) and of her first husband (My Husband: Gabrilowitsch in 1938).

She objected in 1939 to the release of her father's Letters from the Earth, but she changed her stance and allowed them to be published shortly before her death on November 20, 1962. She prevented Charles Neider from including certain of her father's dictations from June 1906 (the 19th, 20th, 22nd, 23rd, and 25th) in the version of The Autobiography of Mark Twain that was in preparation into 1958.

== Published works ==
- My Father, Mark Twain (1931)
- My Husband, Gabrilowitsch (1938)
- Awake to a Perfect Day (1956)
