= Museum of Appalachia =

Museum in Norris, Tennessee

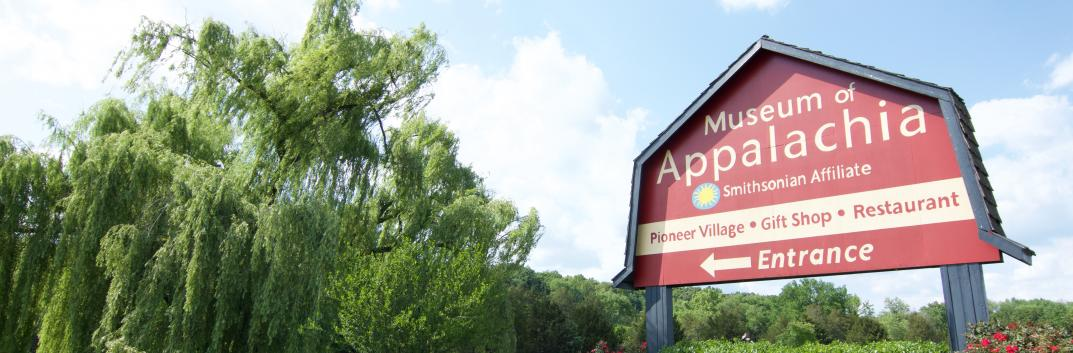
Entrance sign at the Museum of Appalachia

The Museum of Appalachia, located in Norris, Tennessee, 20 miles (32 km) north of Knoxville, is a living history museum that interprets the pioneer and early 20th-century period of the Southern Appalachian region of the United States. Recently named an Affiliate of the Smithsonian Institution, the museum is a collection of more than 30 historic buildings rescued from neglect and decay and gathered onto 63 acres (25 ha) of picturesque pastures and fields. The museum also preserves and displays thousands of authentic relics, maintains one of the nation's largest folk art collections, and hosts performances of traditional Appalachian music and annual demonstrations by hundreds of regional craftsmen.

The museum was established in the 1960s by John Rice Irwin, an East Tennessee educator and businessman, who has followed the basic philosophy of preserving not only structures and artifacts relevant to the region's history, but also preserving each item's individual history— who owned it, when and how it was created or obtained, and how it was used. These oral histories and recollections are housed, along with thousands of photographs, in the museum's archives. Starting from a single log structure, the museum has grown over four decades to include buildings such as the National Register of Historic Places-listed Arnwine Cabin, a rare Appalachian cantilever barn, and a cabin once inhabited by the parents and elder siblings of author Mark Twain. Relics on display include items owned by several notable or colorful Appalachian natives and thousands of tools detailing all aspects of rural life in Southern Appalachia. The museum's grounds mimic a working pioneer Appalachian farm, with gardens growing typical crops and animals such as goats, chickens, turkeys, and peacocks roaming the grounds freely. “What better way is there to know a people,” Irwin asked, “than to study the everyday things they made, used, mended, and cherished. . . And cared for with loving hands.”

== Background ==
Museum founder John Rice Irwin, a descendant of the region's early settlers (his ancestor, James Rice, built the Rice Gristmill that now stands at Norris Dam State Park), was born at his grandparents' farm along Bull Run Creek in Knox County, Tennessee in 1930. His family eventually relocated to the Big Valley area of Union County, but were forced to move when the Tennessee Valley Authority acquired their land for the construction of Norris Lake. His family spent several years in the Gamble Valley community (now part of Oak Ridge), but were forced to move again in the early 1940s when their land was needed for the Manhattan Project. Irwin was always fascinated by his community's elders, and gathered much of his knowledge of old tools and Appalachian agrarian life from spending time on his grandparents' farm. Irwin eventually graduated from Lincoln Memorial University and the University of Tennessee, and spent several years as a businessman and educator, including a stint as superintendent of Anderson County public schools.

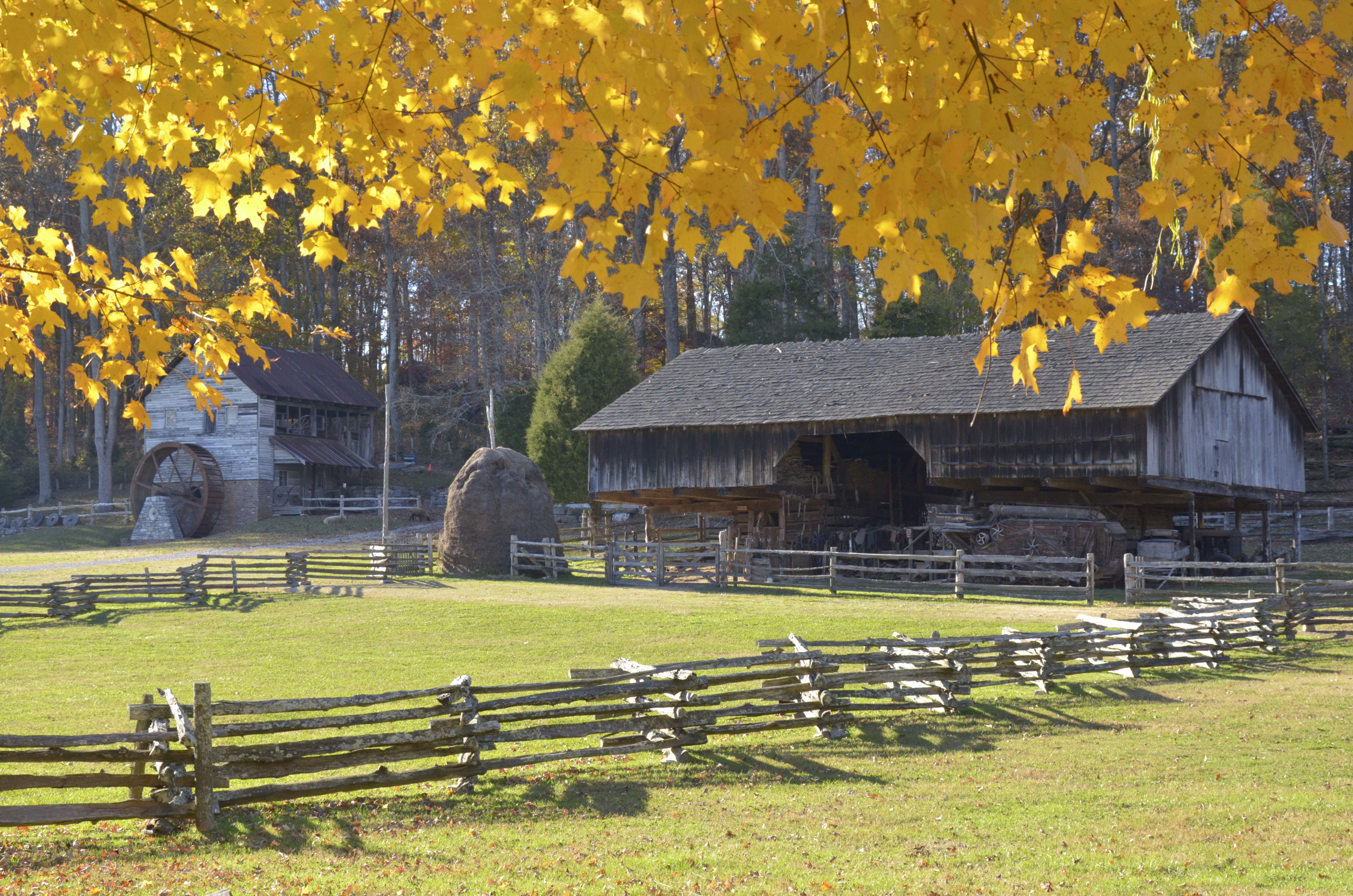
Cantilever Barn and Hacker Martin Grist Mill

At an auction of an old local farm in 1962, Irwin noticed that many of the buyers would forever be removing the items from their historical context. Deciding that the items' true value lay in the history of their usage, Irwin purchased several items, including a horse-shoeing box that had been fished out of the Clinch River in the aftermath of the legendary Big Barren Creek Flood of 1916. Shortly thereafter, he acquired his first log structure—the General Bunch House—and moved it from its original location in the county's remote New River section. Irwin spent his weekends seeking out remote communities around the region in search of pioneer relics, which he displayed in his yard and garage. In 1969, he officially opened the Museum of Appalachia and began charging a nominal admission fee.

In 1977, one of the museum's cabins—the Patterson cabin (also from the New River area)—was used in the television series Young Dan'l Boone, and has since been renamed the "Dan'l Boone Cabin" (although it has no real relation to the famous explorer). Articles in Parade and Reader's Digest and an appearance by Irwin on the Today Show in the mid-1980s greatly boosted attendance. In the 1980s, Alex Haley visited the museum, and immediately decided to move to East Tennessee (he bought the farm across the street from the museum). Haley was inspired by the museum's Steve Parkey exhibit, and made plans to write a novel about this African-American blacksmith from Southern Appalachia. Haley brought many celebrities to the museum, including Oprah Winfrey, Jane Fonda, Brooke Shields, Lou Gossett Jr., Quincy Jones, and more.

Several episodes of WBIR-TV's documentary program The Heartland Series were taped at the museum, including episodes titled "1791," "Just Another Day," "The Music Tale," "The Toggins," "Frontier Music, Frontier Foods," and "Gift for Jacob." The final show of the series was taped at the museum on August 8, 2009, before an audience estimated at 10,000 people, one of the largest crowds in the museum's history.

== Displays ==
=== Open-air and log building displays ===
Along with cabins and barns, the museum displays most types of buildings that would be found on a typical pioneer Appalachian farm, including smokehouses, corn cribs, animal pens, mills, an underground dairy and cellar, and a loom house. Blacksmith shops, a working saw mill, a rural schoolhouse, a log church, a broom and rope shop, and a leather shop— all fully equipped with contemporary materials— are also on display and are occasionally used for demonstrations.

=== Display Barn ===
The museum's two-story Display Barn houses one of the nation's largest collections of pioneer frontier relics. Along with thousands of relics, the barn contains a fully stocked general store setting and a rural post office from Arthur, Tennessee (near Harrogate). Tools on display include an axe that may have been used at colonial Fort Loudoun, the shoeing box fished out of the Clinch in the wake of the Big Barren Creek Flood, and thousands of other tools related to all aspects of rural life in pioneer and early-20th century Appalachia. The collection includes photographs and short descriptions that detail each item's original owner and usage.

=== The People's Building ===
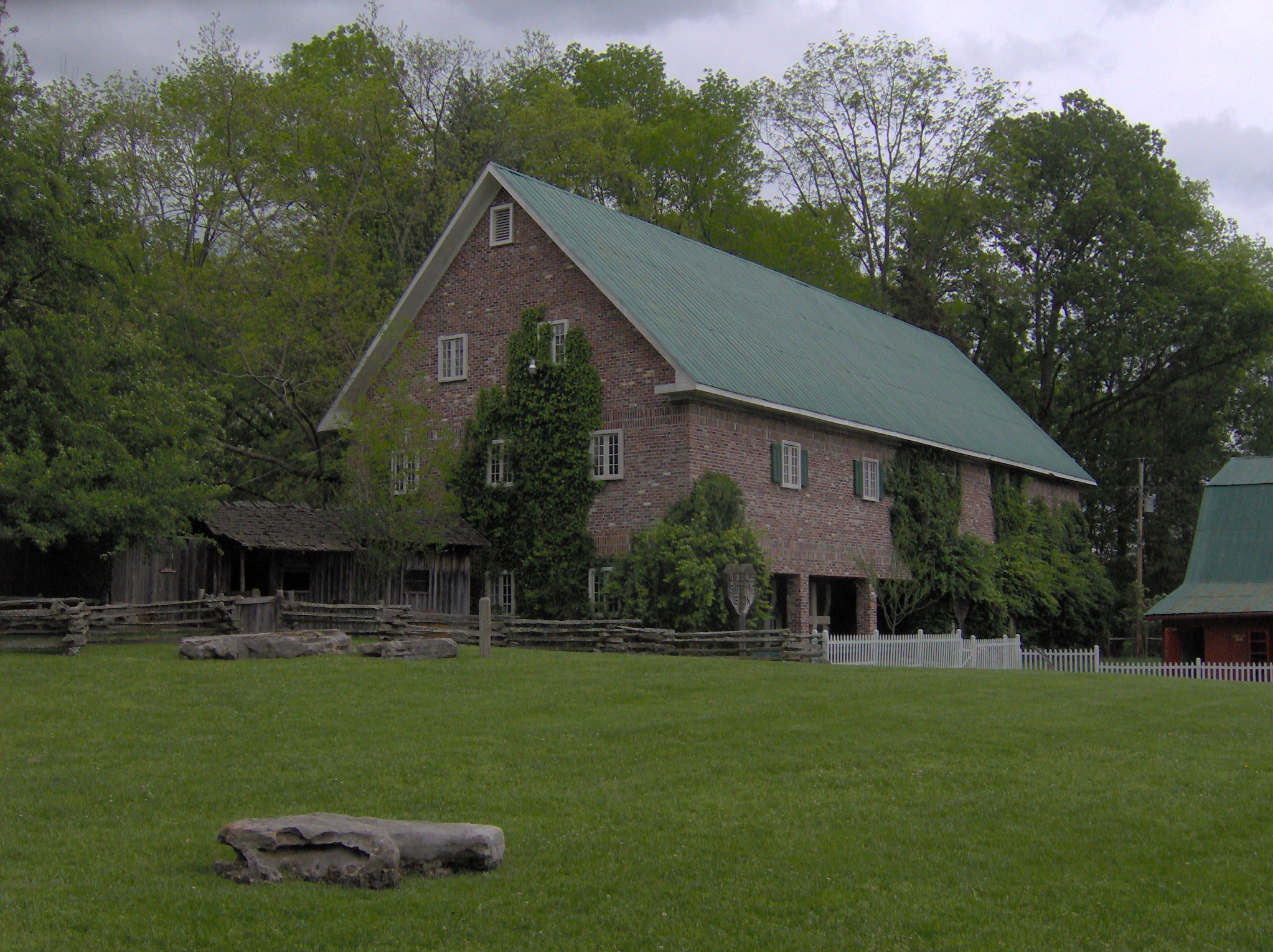
The People's Building

== Events and festivals ==
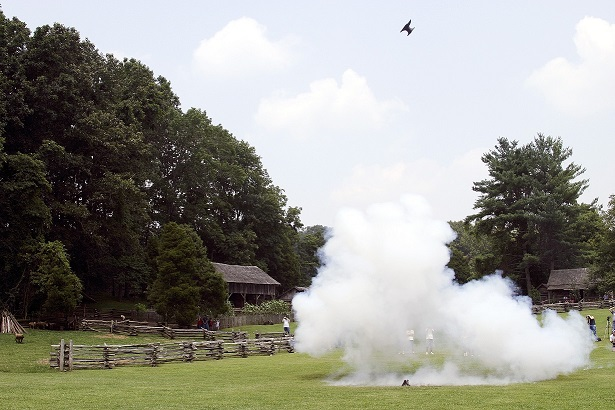
An anvil is blown sky-high during an "anvil shoot" at the museum's July 4 celebration.

For 38 years, the museum hosted an event called "Tennessee Fall Homecoming." Considered one of the nation's largest, most authentic music and folk festivals, Homecoming featured dozens of acclaimed musicians performing all-day on four outdoor stages, as well as evening performances by headlining artists. Bill Monroe, Earl Scruggs, Marty Stuart, Old Crow Medicine Show, Lee Ann Womack, Jerry Douglas, The SteelDrivers, Ralph Stanley, John Hartford, Doc Watson, and Rhonda Vincent are a few of the artists that performed at Homecoming.

== Notable buildings ==
=== Arnwine Cabin ===
- Arnwine Cabin
- U.S. National Register of Historic Places
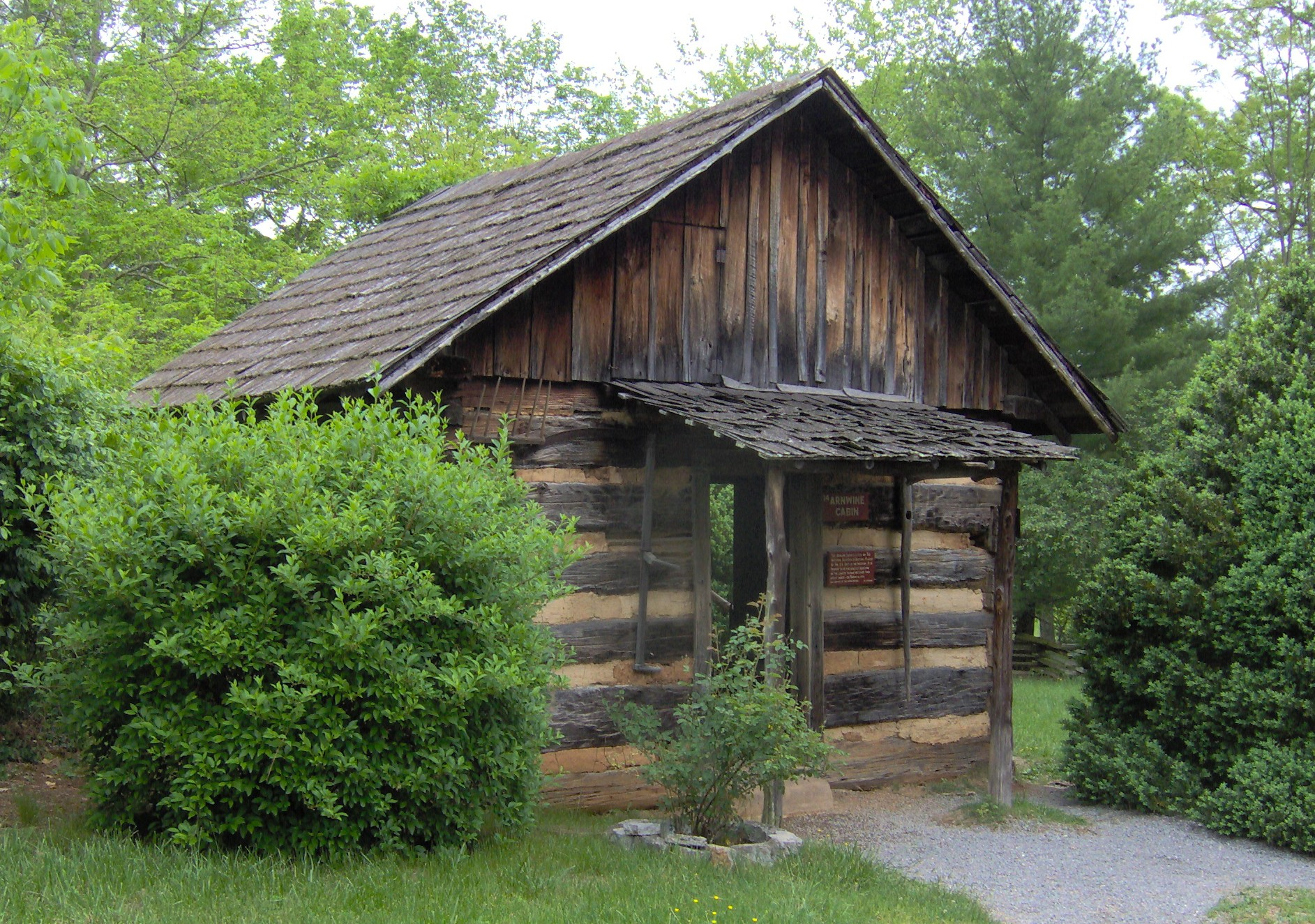
- Location: TN 61
- Nearest city: Norris, Tennessee
- Built: 1800s
- NRHP reference No.: 76001760
- Added to NRHP: 1976

The Arnwine Cabin was built using hewn poplar logs between 1795 and 1820, and its first known occupant was John Wesley Arnwine. The cabin was originally located along the Clinch River near the Liberty Hill community in Grainger County. In the early 1930s, the Tennessee Valley Authority acquired the cabin's 20-acre (8.1 ha) tract for the construction of Norris Lake, and the cabin was moved a short distance. Two of Arnwine's daughters, Polly Anne (d. 1923) and Eliza Jane (d. 1936) lived in the cabin their entire lives, and after Eliza Jane's death the cabin was used for storage and fell into ruin. John Rice Irwin acquired the cabin in 1964 and moved it to the present museum site.

Irwin decided the roof could not be salvaged, so he and two associates split 5,400 shingles from a single red oak tree and built the present roof. The cabin's floor was also missing, so Irwin located a contemporary puncheon floor at a smokehouse near Sneedville and moved it to the Arnwine Cabin. The stone part of the cabin's chimney was moved from the ruins of a contemporary house in the Laurel Grove community just north of the museum, and a stick-and-mud section was added. Over several years, the cabin was outfitted with authentic furniture, tools, and utensils from the region's pioneer period.

=== Mark Twain family cabin ===
The "Mark Twain family cabin" is believed to have belonged to Twain's father, John Clemens, where he lived with Twain's mother, Jane Lampton Clemens, and it may have been where the author's older siblings (including Orion Clemens) were born and where the author himself was conceived (the Clemens family moved to Missouri a few months before he was born). The cabin was originally located in the Possum Trot community in Fentress County, Tennessee, where John Clemens served as a post master and circuit court clerk. The cabin's chimney was added around 1905. The Museum of Appalachia purchased and moved the cabin to the museum in 1995.

== Comprehensive list of historical structures ==
| Structure | Image | Constructed | Original location | Builder/principal owner |
|---|---|---|---|---|
| Tom Cassidy house | | | Union County, Tennessee | Tom Cassidy |
| Gwen Sharp Playhouse | | 1929 | Loyston, Tennessee | Sharp family neighbor |
| Jail cells | | 1874 | Madisonville, Tennessee | |
| Leather and saddle shop | | | Near Rogersville, Tennessee | Hobart Hagood (d. 1961) |
| Mark Twain family cabin | | 1830s | Near Pall Mall, Tennessee | John Clemens (1798–1847) |
| Wilson Barn | | | Union County, Tennessee | |
| Blacksmith and wheelwright shop | | | Near Andersonville, Tennessee | |
| Bunch smokehouse | | c. 1830 | Grainger County, Tennessee | |
| General Bunch House | | 1898 | Anderson County, Tennessee | Pryor Bunch (1852–1931) |
| Arnwine Cabin | | c. 1795-1820 | Grainger County, Tennessee | John Wesley Arnwine |
| Old Sharp corn mill | | | Union County, Tennessee | Sharp family |
| McClung Cabin | | 1790s | Knoxville, Tennessee | McClung family |
| Broom and rope shop | | | Clinchport, Virginia | Mary Carter |
| Cox corn crib | | | Near Norris, Tennessee | Bunk Cox |
| Longworth corncrib | | | Claiborne County, Tennessee | Longworth family |
| Dan'l Boone Cabin | | Early 19th century | Anderson County, Tennessee | Patterson family |
| Sheep pen | | | Near Clinton, Tennessee | Wilshire family |
| Big Tater Valley School | | early 19th century | Grainger County, Tennessee | Crockett Skeen |
| Irwin's Chapel Church | | c. 1840 | Madison County, North Carolina | Thomas Tweed |
| Peters Homestead house | | c. 1790-1838 | Near Luttrell, Tennessee | John Peters, Nathaniel Peters |
| Homestead loom house | | | Near Maynardville, Tennessee | Bishop Hatmaker |
| Homestead smokehouse and granary | | | Powell Valley, Tennessee | Childress family |
| Parkey blacksmith shop | | | Hancock County, Tennessee | Steve Parkey |
| Whiskey still | | | | Marvin "Popcorn" Sutton (set up) |
| Joe Diehl Sawmill | | Early 20th century | Knox County, Tennessee | |
| Cantilever barn | | | Seymour, Tennessee | Unknown |
| Hacker Martin Gristmill | | 1790s | Near Gray, Tennessee | Coonrod Dove |

== See also ==
- Great Smoky Mountains Heritage Center – Museum in Tennessee
- List of music museums
- Open-air museum – Museum that exhibits collections of buildings and artifacts out-of-doors
