= Governor Clements =

Governor Clements may refer to:

- Bill Clements (1917–2011), 42nd & 44th Governor of Texas
- Earle Clements (1896–1985), 47th Governor of Kentucky

== See also ==
- Orion Clemens (1825–1897), Acting Governor of Nevada Territory
- Governor Clement (disambiguation)
