= Jane Lampton Clemens =

Mother of author Mark Twain

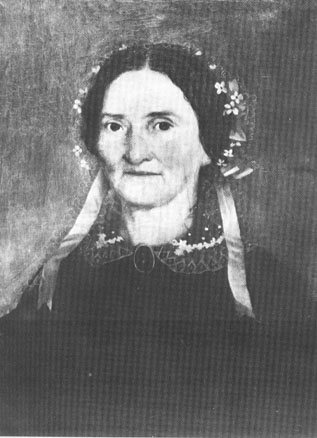
- Born: Jane Lampton; June 18, 1803; Adair County, Kentucky, U.S.
- Died: October 27, 1890 (aged 87); Keokuk, Iowa, U.S.
- Spouse: John Marshall Clemens (m. 1823)
- Children: 7, including Orion and Samuel

Jane Lampton Clemens (June 18, 1803 – October 27, 1890) was the mother of author Mark Twain. She was the inspiration of the character "Aunt Polly" in Twain's 1876 novel The Adventures of Tom Sawyer. She was regarded as a "cheerful, affectionate, and strong woman" with a "gift for storytelling" and as the person from whom Mark Twain inherited his sense of humor.

== Early life and family ==
Jane Lampton was born on June 18, 1803, in Adair County, Kentucky, the daughter of Benjamin Lampton and Margaret Casey Lampton. She grew up in Columbia, Kentucky, and was known to be a good horsewoman and dancer. Her maternal grandfather was Colonel William Casey, an early Kentucky pioneer and the namesake of Casey County, Kentucky. When Colonel Casey became ill, Lampton learned medical skills from her grandfather, but he died when she was sixteen years old. One year later, Lampton's mother, Margaret, died.

She married John Marshall Clemens on May 26, 1823, in Columbia, Adair County, Kentucky. She was a religiously conservative Presbyterian, while her husband was an agnostic freethinker who admired Thomas Paine. Together, they had seven children, however four of them died before reaching the age of 20. Three of their children lived into adulthood, including Orion (1825–1897), Pamela (1827–1904), and Samuel (1835–1910).

== Later life ==
The Clemens family moved to Fentress County, Tennessee, where her husband practiced law, operated a general store, and served as a county commissioner, county clerk, and acting attorney general as a conservative Whig.

The Clemens family owned several enslaved persons, and Twain later reflected on his mother's attitudes towards slavery, writing, "Kind-hearted and compassionate as she was, I think she was not conscious that slavery was a bald, grotesque, and unwarranted usurpation. She had never heard it assailed in any pulpit, but had heard it defended and sanctified in a thousand. As far as her experience went, the wise, the good, and the holy were unanimous in the belief that slavery was right, righteous, sacred, the peculiar pet of the Deity, and a condition which the slave himself ought to be daily and nightly thankful for."

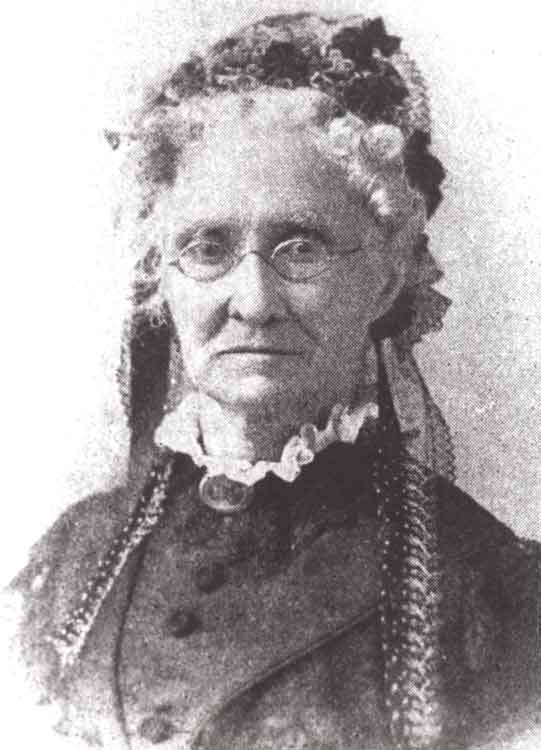
Photograph of Clemens later in life, circa 1870s

The cabin in which the Clemens family is believed to have lived in Fentress County is displayed as part of the collection of the Museum of Appalachia in Norris, Tennessee. In 1835, the Clemens family moved to Florida, Missouri, where their son Samuel, who was to become famous as the author Mark Twain, was born on November 30, 1835 (now preserved as the Mark Twain Birthplace State Historic Site)

In 1839, the Clemens family moved to Hannibal, Missouri, a port town on the Mississippi River which was to eventually inspire some of Mark Twain's stories. The home in Hannibal is now known as the Mark Twain Boyhood Home & Museum.

In the years following her husband's death in 1847, Clemens moved around living with her surviving children. During the American Civil War in the 1860s, Clemens was supportive of the cause of the Confederacy and was described as a "fierce secessionist." After Samuel married in 1870, Clemens went to live with her daughter Pamela, who like Samuel lived in upstate New York.

When she lived in Keokuk, Iowa, in the 1880s, Clemens was a neighbor and friend of feminist and suffragette Ida Hinman. In 1880, Twain named his newborn daughter Jane Lampton "Jean" Clemens after his mother.

== Death ==
Clemens died on October 27, 1890, in Keokuk at the age of 87. She was buried in Mount Olivet Cemetery in Hannibal, Missouri. After her death, her son Mark Twain wrote, "The greatest difference which I find between her and the rest of the people whom I have known, is this, and it is a remarkable one: those others felt a strong interest in a few things, whereas to the very day of her death she felt a strong interest in the whole world and everything and everybody in it."

== Legacy ==
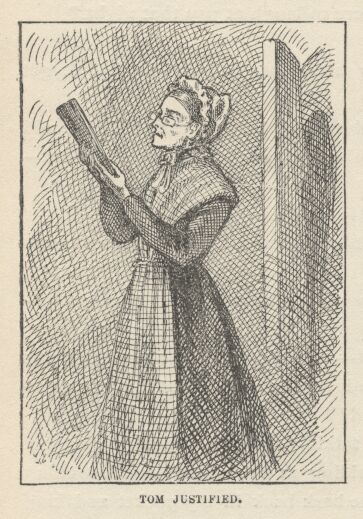
Illustration of "Aunt Polly" by True Williams in The Adventures of Tom Sawyer, 1876.

The influence of Clemens on her son Mark Twain's writings has been the subject of scholarly debate and analysis. She has been described as the person from whom Twain inherited his sense of humor and gift of storytelling.

Twain wrote a memoir to his mother that was published in Mark Twain's Hannibal, Huck, and Tom. In 1868, he delivered a speech in Washington, D.C., which served as a tribute to his mother and to mothers around the world.

Clemens was the inspiration behind the character of "Aunt Polly" in her son's novels The Adventures of Tom Sawyer and Adventures of Huckleberry Finn.

State Historical Marker #128 in Columbia, Kentucky, notes the location of the childhood home of Clemens. Clemens is also the namesake of the Columbia chapter of the Daughters of the American Revolution.

There is a display about the life of Clemens at the Mark Twain Birthplace State Historic Site Museum.

Clemens is portrayed by Kay Johnson in the 1944 film, The Adventures of Mark Twain.

Clemens' story is shared in the 2001 Ken Burns documentary Mark Twain, and she is portrayed by a female voice actor in the series.
