= Governor Clement =

Governor Clement may refer to:

- Frank G. Clement (1920–1969), 41st Governor of Tennessee
- Percival W. Clement (1846–1927), 57th Governor of Vermont

== See also ==
- Governor Clements (disambiguation)
