= Roughing It =

1872 travel memoir by Mark Twain

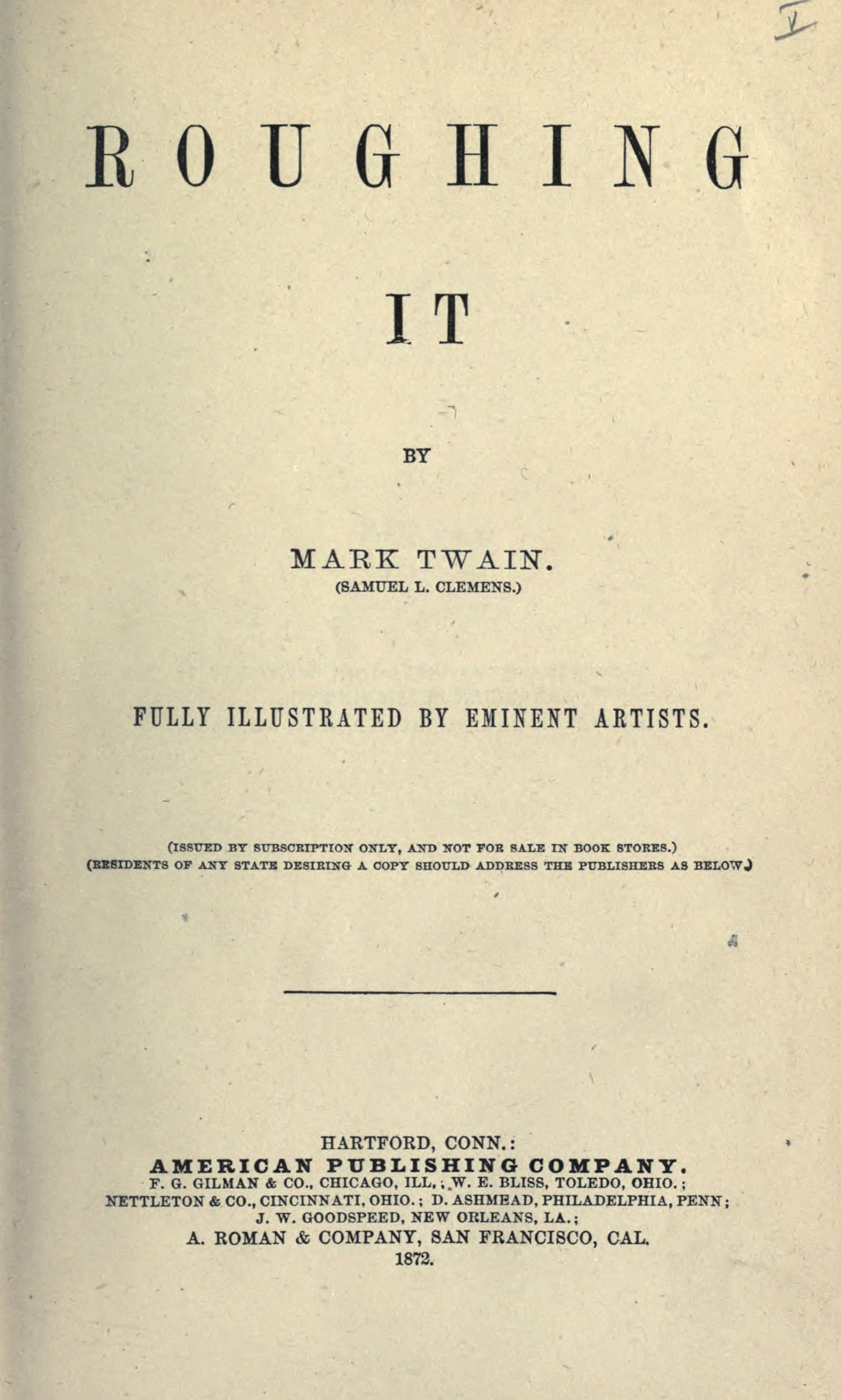
- Title page from first edition
- Author: Mark Twain
- Language: English
- Genre: Travel literature
- Publisher: American Publishing Company
- Publication date: 1872
- Publication place: United States
- Media type: Print
- Pages: 608 (including title page)
- Preceded by: The Innocents Abroad (1869)
- Followed by: The Gilded Age: A Tale of Today (1873)

Roughing It is a book of semi-autobiographical travel literature by Mark Twain. It was written in 1870–71 and published in 1872, following his first travel book The Innocents Abroad (1869). Roughing It is dedicated to Twain's mining companion Calvin H. Higbie, later a civil engineer who died in 1914.

The book follows the travels of young Mark Twain through the American West during the years 1861–1867. He joined his brother Orion Clemens, who had been appointed Secretary of the Nevada Territory, on a stagecoach journey west. Twain consulted his brother's diary to refresh his memory and borrowed heavily from his imagination for many stories in the book.

Roughing It illustrates many of Twain's early adventures, including a visit to Salt Lake City, gold and silver prospecting, real-estate speculation, a journey to the Kingdom of Hawaii, and his beginnings as a writer. This memoir provides examples of Twain's rough-hewn humor, which became a staple of his writing in later books such as The Adventures of Tom Sawyer (1876), Adventures of Huckleberry Finn (1884), and A Connecticut Yankee in King Arthur's Court (1889).

== In popular culture ==
U.S. astronauts Frank Borman and Jim Lovell read Roughing It aloud to pass the time aboard NASA's Gemini VII, a 14-day-long Earth orbital mission in December 1965.

== Adaptations ==
Various sections of Roughing It were borrowed by television series such as Bonanza. In 1960, an hour-long adaptation was broadcast on NBC starring Andrew Prine and James Daly.

A four-hour 2002 mini-series adaptation was broadcast on Hallmark Channel. Directed by Charles Martin Smith, it starred James Garner as an elderly Samuel Clemens and Robin Dunne as a young Clemens.

Roughing It recounts midway through the book that a rich "blind lead" gold strike was discovered and claimed by a partnership of Twain, Calvin Higbie, and a mine foreman A.D. Allen, giving them well-founded hopes of being millionaires. To establish a claim, it was required that any or all of the claimants do a reasonable amount of work on the claimed strike within ten days. Due to chance happenings and failed communications between the three, the work requirement was left unfulfilled, and the forfeited but rich claim was quickly seized by others ten days after it was discovered. In the dedication of the book, Twain refers to Higbie as an "Honest Man, a Genial Comrade, and a Steadfast Friend … dedicated in Memory of the Curious Time When We Two Were Millionaires for Ten Days". The prospecting story is also covered in a 1968 episode of the syndicated television anthology series Death Valley Days, hosted by Robert Taylor. In the television dramatization, Tom Skerritt plays Twain, and Dabney Coleman was cast as Higbie.
