= Old Times on the Mississippi =

1876 book by Mark Twain

- First Canadian edition, 1876
- Author: Mark Twain
- Language: English
- Genre: Memoir
- Publication date: 1876

Old Times on the Mississippi is a memoir by Mark Twain. It was published in 1876. A serialized version of the work first appeared in the Atlantic Monthly Magazine published in 1875. It was later incorporated into his 1883 work, Life on the Mississippi.
