= John Marshall Clemens =

American lawyer (1798–1847)

- Born: August 11, 1798; Campbell, Virginia
- Died: March 24, 1847 (aged 48); Marion, Missouri
- Known for: being the father of Mark Twain and Orion Clemens
- Spouse: Jane Lampton Clemens

John Marshall Clemens (August 11, 1798 – March 24, 1847) was the father of author Mark Twain and of journalist and politician Orion Clemens, who was the first and only Secretary of the Nevada Territory.

== Biography ==
Clemens was the scion of a Virginia family that owned both land and slaves in that state. The Clemenses were said to be a Cornish American family originally from Looe in Cornwall, England. However, the Looe museum provides evidence showing that they instead emigrated from Corby, in Northamptonshire. He was born in Campbell County, Virginia, the eldest of five children, to Samuel B. and Pamela Goggin Clemens. He was named after future U.S. Chief Justice John Marshall.

His father died in 1805, whereupon the family moved to Kentucky. Pamela Clemens remarried in 1809, and John Clemens started working at age 11, as a clerk at an iron mine. He undertook the study of law in a local law office and became a licensed lawyer at the age of 21. At that same age, he became legally responsible for financial obligations deemed to be owed to his Kentucky stepfather for the costs of supporting the Clemens children and keeping family slaves. The burden of this debt left him without financial resources.

He married Jane Lampton on May 6, 1823, in Columbia, Adair County, Kentucky. She was a religiously conservative Presbyterian, while he was an agnostic freethinker who admired Thomas Paine. They moved to Fentress County, Tennessee, where he practiced law, operated a general store, and served as a county commissioner, county clerk, and acting attorney general as a conservative Whig. From 1832 to 1835 he was postmaster in Pall Mall. He speculated unsuccessfully in land and opened four stores which were unsuccessful.

In 1835 the Clemens family, which by then included five children, moved to Missouri, initially to the town of Florida, where his son Samuel, who was to become famous as the author Mark Twain, was born on November 30, 1835. John Clemens practiced law and operated a general store in Florida for several years before moving to Hannibal in 1839. His retail business ventures were not successful, but he was active in civic affairs. He served as a steamboat and railroad commissioner and became a county judge. He served in the Missouri militia but did not serve in the debacle of the Honey War.

John Clemens was the father of five sons (including Orion) and two daughters. He died in March 1847 from pleurisy and pneumonia. His widow suspected syphilis was involved and ordered an autopsy which the young Samuel Clemens may have witnessed.

Writing in his 1897 travelogue Following the Equator, Mark Twain remembered his father as "a refined and kindly gentleman, very grave, rather austere, of rigid probity, a sternly just and upright man". Twain recalled that Clemens only physically disciplined him twice, "yet every now and then he cuffed our harmless slave boy, Lewis, for trifling little blunders and awkardnesses."

== Cabin ==
The cabin in which the Clemens family is believed to have lived in Fentress County, Tennessee, is displayed as part of the collection of the Museum of Appalachia in Norris, Tennessee.
