= Mark Twain =

American author and humorist (1835–1910)

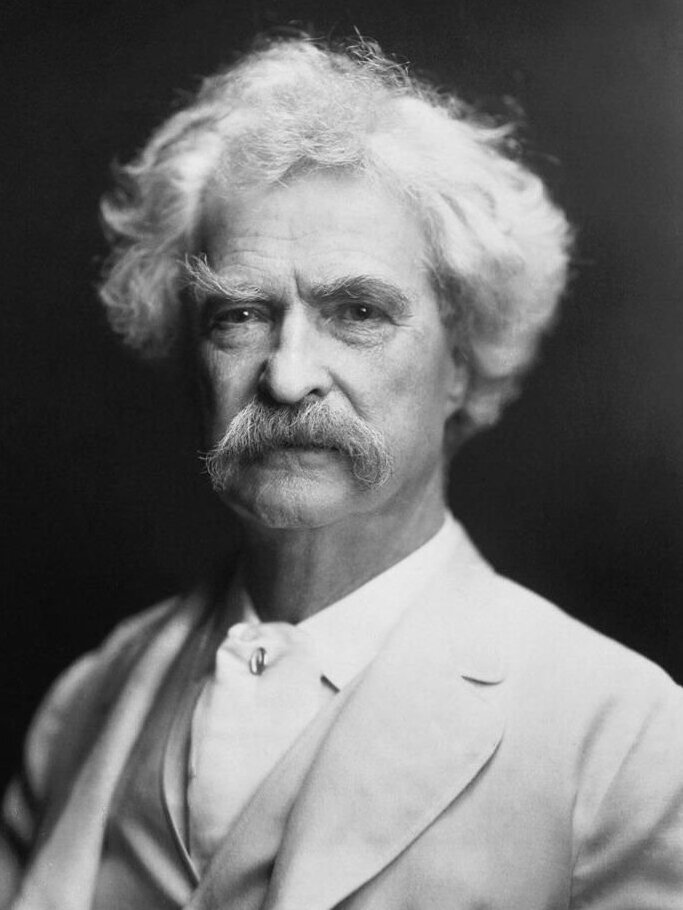
- Twain in 1907
- Born: Samuel Langhorne Clemens; November 30, 1835; Florida, Missouri, U.S.
- Died: April 21, 1910 (aged 74); Redding, Connecticut, U.S.
- Resting place: Woodlawn Cemetery, Elmira, New York, U.S.
- Occupations: Writer; humorist; entrepreneur; publisher; lecturer
- Employers: Territorial Enterprise; The Sacramento Union; The Alta California; New-York Tribune
- Spouse: Olivia Langdon (m. 1870; died 1904)
- Children: 4, including Susy, Clara, and Jean
- Parents: John Marshall Clemens; Jane Lampton Clemens
- Relatives: Orion Clemens (brother)
- Writing career
- Pen name: Mark Twain; Josh; Thomas Jefferson Snodgrass
- Language: American English
- Years active: 1863–1910
- Genres: Adventure fiction; speculative fiction; travelogue; opinion journalism; literary criticism; polemic; essay; autobiography; correspondence; oration
- Movement: American Realism

Samuel Langhorne Clemens (November 30, 1835 – April 21, 1910), known by the pen name Mark Twain, was an American writer, humorist, and essayist. He has been praised as the "greatest humorist the United States has produced", with William Faulkner calling him "the father of American literature". Twain's novels include The Adventures of Tom Sawyer (1876) and its sequel, Adventures of Huckleberry Finn (1884), with the latter often called the "Great American Novel". He also wrote A Connecticut Yankee in King Arthur's Court (1889) and Pudd'nhead Wilson (1894) and cowrote The Gilded Age: A Tale of Today (1873) with Charles Dudley Warner.

Twain was raised in Hannibal, Missouri, which later provided the setting for both Tom Sawyer and Huckleberry Finn. He served an apprenticeship with a printer early in his career, and then worked as a typesetter, contributing articles to his older brother Orion Clemens's newspaper. Twain then became a riverboat pilot on the Mississippi River, which provided him the material for Life on the Mississippi (1883). Soon after, Twain headed west to join Orion in Nevada. He referred humorously to his lack of success at mining, turning to journalism for the Virginia City Territorial Enterprise.

Twain first achieved success as a writer with the humorous story "The Celebrated Jumping Frog of Calaveras County," which was published in 1865; it was based on a story that he heard at the Angels Hotel in Angels Camp, California, where Twain had spent some time while he was working as a miner. The short story brought Twain international attention. He wrote both fiction and non-fiction. As his fame grew, Twain became a much sought-after speaker. His wit and satire, both in prose and in speech, earned praise from critics and peers, and Twain was a friend to presidents, artists, industrialists, and European royalty.

Although Twain initially spoke out in favor of American interests in the Hawaiian Islands, he later reversed his position, going on to become vice president of the American Anti-Imperialist League from 1901 until his death in 1910, coming out strongly against the Philippine–American War and American colonialism. Twain published a satirical pamphlet, "King Leopold's Soliloquy", in 1905 about Belgian atrocities in the Congo Free State.

Twain earned a great deal of money from his writing and lectures, but invested in ventures that lost most of it, such as the Paige Compositor, a mechanical typesetter that failed because of its complexity and imprecision. He filed for bankruptcy after these financial setbacks, but in time overcame his financial troubles with the help of Standard Oil executive Henry Huttleston Rogers, who helped Twain manage his finances and copyrights. Twain eventually paid all his creditors in full, even though his declaration of bankruptcy meant he was not required to do so. One hundred years after his death, the first volume of his autobiography was published.

Twain was born shortly after an appearance of Halley's Comet and predicted that his death would accompany it as well, writing in 1909: "I came in with Halley's Comet in 1835; it's coming again next year, and I expect to go out with it. It would be a great disappointment in my life if I don't. The Almighty has said, no doubt: 'Now here are these two unaccountable freaks; they came in together, they must go out together.'" He died of a heart attack the day after the comet was at its closest to the Sun.

== Biography ==
=== Early life ===
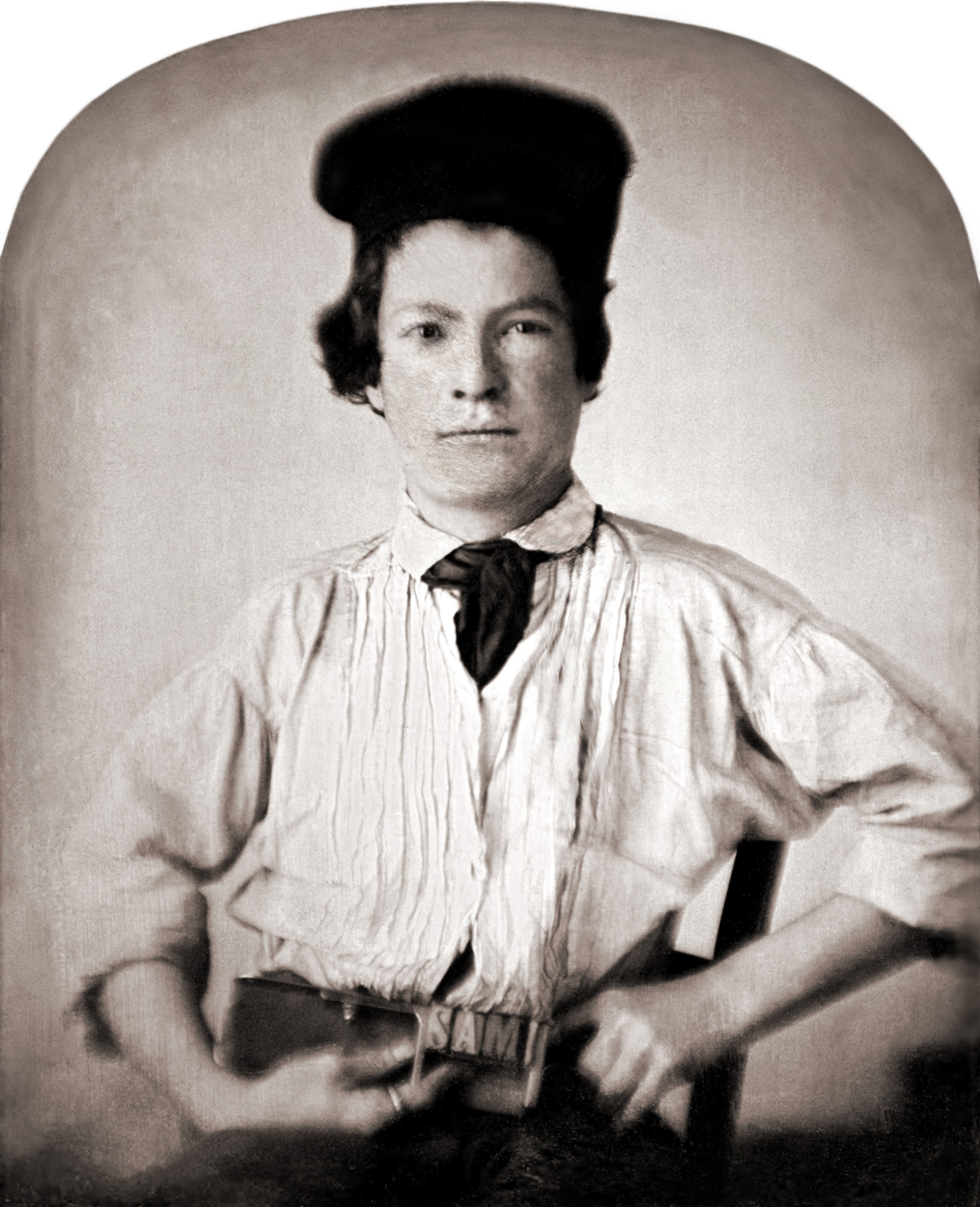
Samuel Clemens, age 15 holding metal type in a composing stick that spells out his first name. As a daguerreotype, whose creation involved no intermediate negative, the image is laterally reversed. Hence the type, which, in actuality, was backward, is readable, though Twain himself is flipped.

Samuel Langhorne Clemens was born on November 30, 1835, in Florida, Missouri. He was the sixth of seven children of Jane (née Lampton; 1803–1890), a native of Kentucky, and John Marshall Clemens (1798–1847), a native of Virginia.

His parents met when his father, a lawyer called to the bar in Kentucky, tried to help Jane's father and uncle avoid bankruptcy. They were married in 1823. Twain was of English and Scots-Irish descent. Only three of his siblings lived beyond childhood: Orion (1825–1897), Pamela (1827–1904), and Henry (1838–1858). His brother Pleasant Hannibal (1828) died at three weeks of age, his sister Margaret (1830–1839) died when Twain was three, and his brother Benjamin (1832–1842) died three years later.

When he was four, Twain's family moved to Hannibal, Missouri, a port town on the Mississippi River that inspired the fictional town of St. Petersburg in The Adventures of Tom Sawyer and The Adventures of Huckleberry Finn. Slavery was legal in Missouri at the time, and it became a theme in these writings. His father was an attorney and judge who died of pneumonia in 1847, when Twain was only 11. The following year, Twain left school after the fifth grade to become a printer's apprentice. In 1851, he began working as a typesetter, contributing articles and humorous sketches to the Hannibal Journal, a newspaper that Orion owned. When Twain was 18, he left Hannibal and worked as a printer in New York City, Philadelphia, St. Louis, and Cincinnati, joining the newly formed International Typographical Union, the printers' trade union. Twain educated himself in public libraries in the evenings, finding wider information than at a conventional school.

Twain describes his boyhood in Life on the Mississippi, stating that "there was but one permanent ambition" among his comrades: to be a steamboatman. "Pilot was the grandest position of all. The pilot, even in those days of trivial wages, had a princely salary – from a hundred and fifty to two hundred and fifty dollars a month, and no board to pay." As Twain described it, the pilot's prestige exceeded that of the captain. The pilot had to "get up a warm personal acquaintanceship with every old snag and one-limbed cottonwood and every obscure wood pile that ornaments the banks of this river for twelve hundred miles; and more than that, must... actually know where these things are in the dark". Steamboat pilot Horace E. Bixby took Twain on as a cub pilot to teach him the river between New Orleans and St. Louis for $500 (equivalent to $19,000 in 2025), payable out of Twain's first wages after graduating. Twain studied the Mississippi, learning its landmarks, how to navigate its currents effectively, and how to read the river and its constantly shifting channels, reefs, submerged snags, and rocks that would "tear the life out of the strongest vessel that ever floated". It was more than two years before he received his pilot's license. Piloting also gave Twain his pen name from "mark twain", the leadsman's cry for a measured river depth of two fathoms (12 feet), which was safe water for a steamboat.

As a young pilot, Clemens served on the steamer A. B. Chambers with Grant Marsh, who became famous for his exploits as a steamboat captain on the Missouri River. The two liked and admired each other, and maintained a correspondence for many years after Clemens left the river.

While training, Samuel convinced his younger brother Henry to work with him, and even arranged a post of mud clerk for him on the steamboat Pennsylvania. On June 13, 1858, the steamboat's boiler exploded; Henry succumbed to his wounds eight days later. Twain claimed to have foreseen this death in a dream a month earlier, which inspired his interest in parapsychology; Twain was an early member of the Society for Psychical Research. Twain was guilt-stricken and held himself responsible for the rest of his life. Twain continued to work on the river and was a river pilot until the Civil War broke out in 1861, when traffic was curtailed along the Mississippi River.

At the start of hostilities, he enlisted briefly in a local Confederate unit, the Marion Rangers as a Second Lieutenant. Twain later wrote the sketch "The Private History of a Campaign That Failed", describing how he and his friends had been Confederate volunteers for two weeks before their unit disbanded.

Twain then left for Nevada to work for his brother Orion, who was Secretary of the Nevada Territory. Twain describes the episode in his book Roughing It.

=== In the American West ===
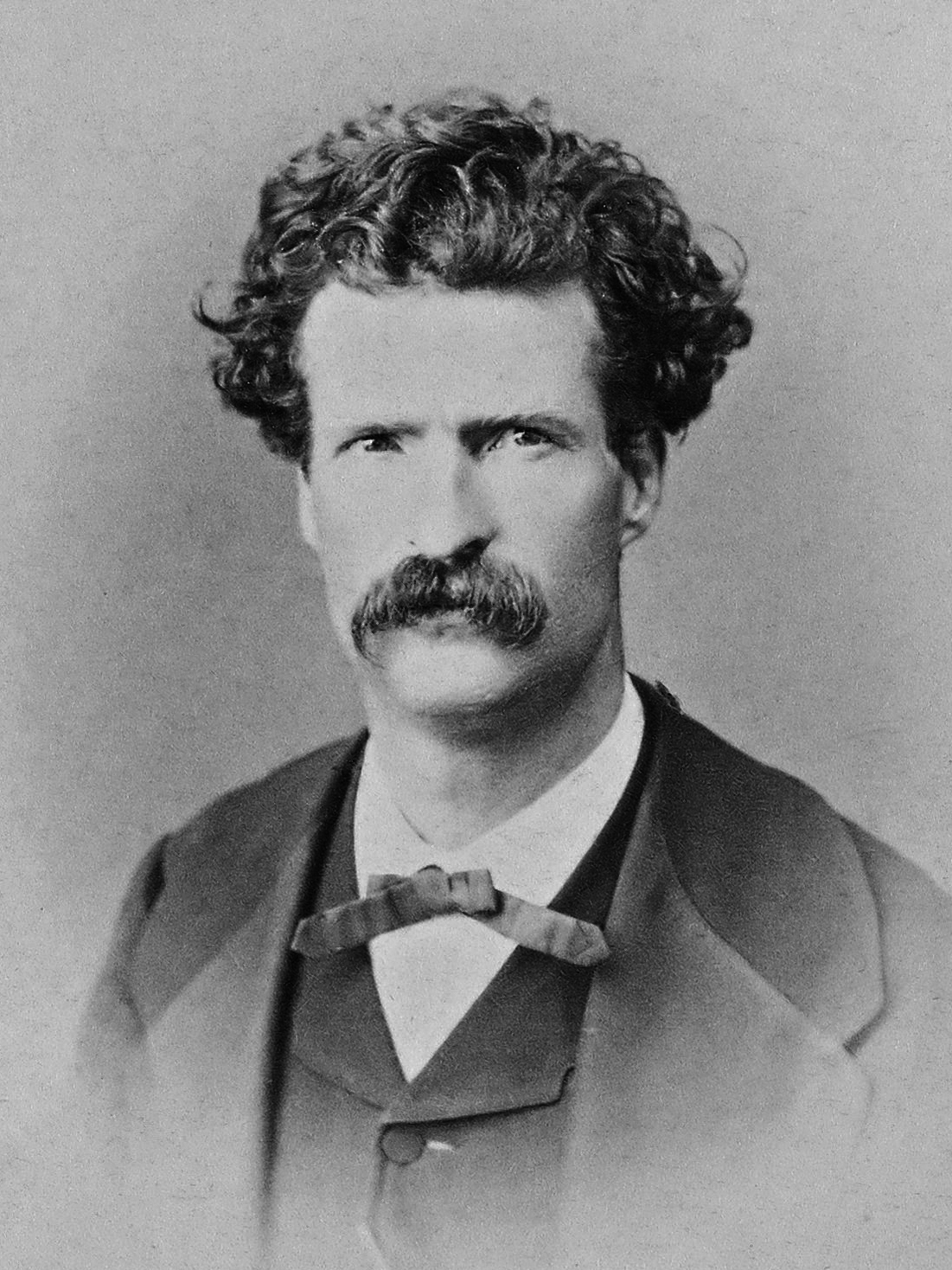
Twain, age 31

Orion became secretary to Nevada Territory governor James W. Nye in 1861, and Twain joined him when he moved west. The brothers traveled more than two weeks on a stagecoach across the Great Plains and the Rocky Mountains, visiting the Mormon community in Salt Lake City.

Twain's journey ended in the silver-mining town of Virginia City, Nevada, where he became a miner on the Comstock Lode. Twain failed as a miner and went to work at the Virginia City newspaper Territorial Enterprise, working under a friend, the writer Dan DeQuille. Twain first used his pen name here on February 3, 1863, when he wrote a humorous travel account titled "Letter From Carson – re: Joe Goodman; party at Gov. Johnson's; music" and signed it "Mark Twain".

Twain's experiences in the American West inspired Roughing It, written during 1870–71 and published in 1872. His experiences in Angels Camp (in Calaveras County, California) provided material for "The Celebrated Jumping Frog of Calaveras County" (1865).

Twain moved to San Francisco in 1864, still as a journalist, and met writers such as Bret Harte and Artemus Ward. He may have been romantically involved with the poet Ina Coolbrith.

Twain's first success as a writer came when his humorous tall tale "The Celebrated Jumping Frog of Calaveras County" was published on November 18, 1865, in the New York weekly The Saturday Press, bringing him national attention. A year later, Twain traveled to the Sandwich Islands (present-day Hawaii) as a reporter for the Sacramento Union. His letters to the Union were popular and became the basis for his first lectures.

In 1867, local newspapers The Alta California and New-York Tribune funded Twain's trip to the Mediterranean aboard the Quaker City, including a tour of Europe and the Middle East. He wrote a collection of travel letters which were later compiled as The Innocents Abroad (1869). It was on this trip that Twain met fellow passenger Charles Langdon, who showed him a picture of his sister Olivia. Twain later claimed to have fallen in love at first sight.

Upon returning to the United States, Twain was offered honorary membership in Yale University's secret society Scroll and Key in 1868.

=== Marriage and children ===
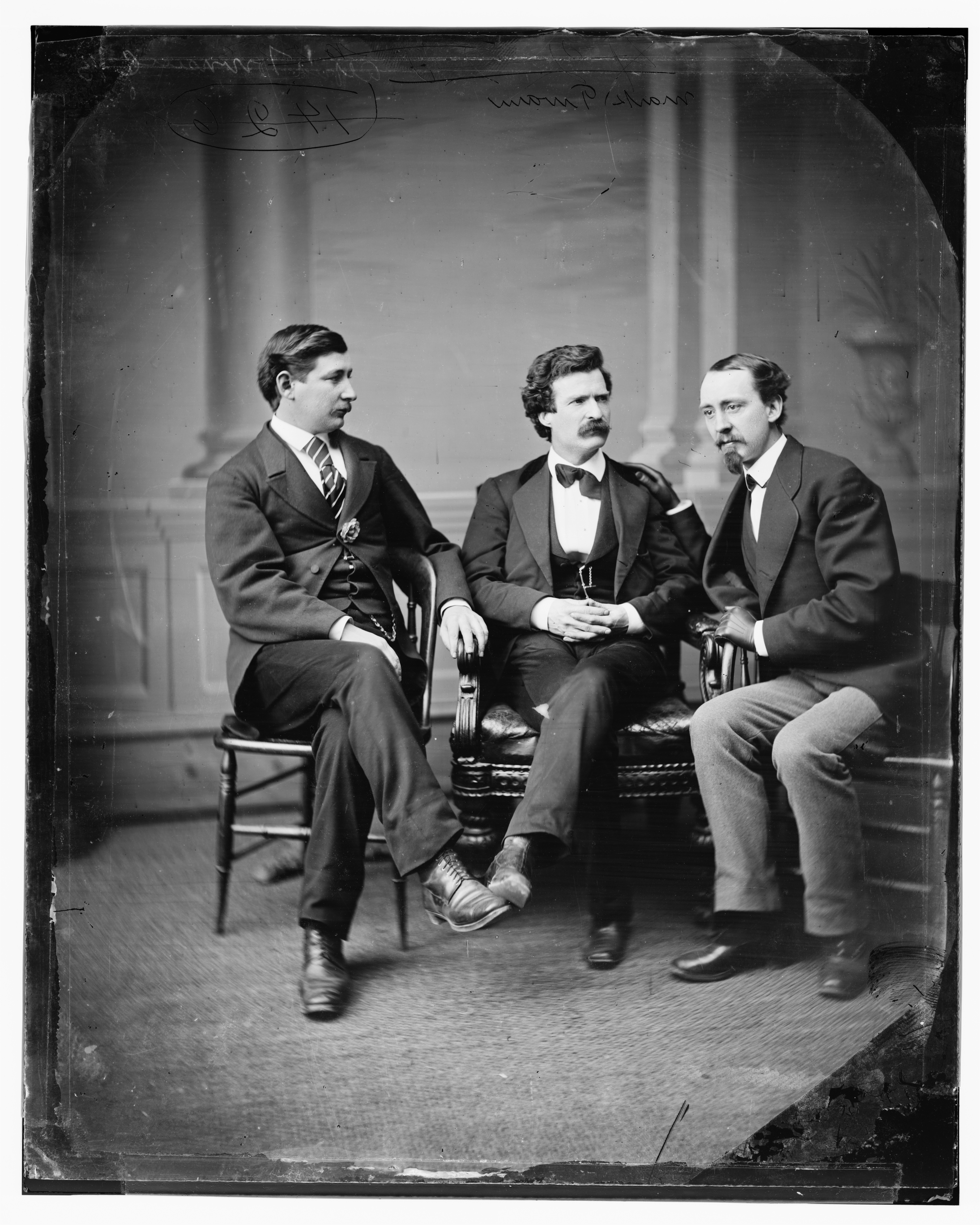
(From l. to r.) American Civil War correspondent and author George Alfred Townsend, Mark Twain and David Gray, editor of the rival Buffalo Courier

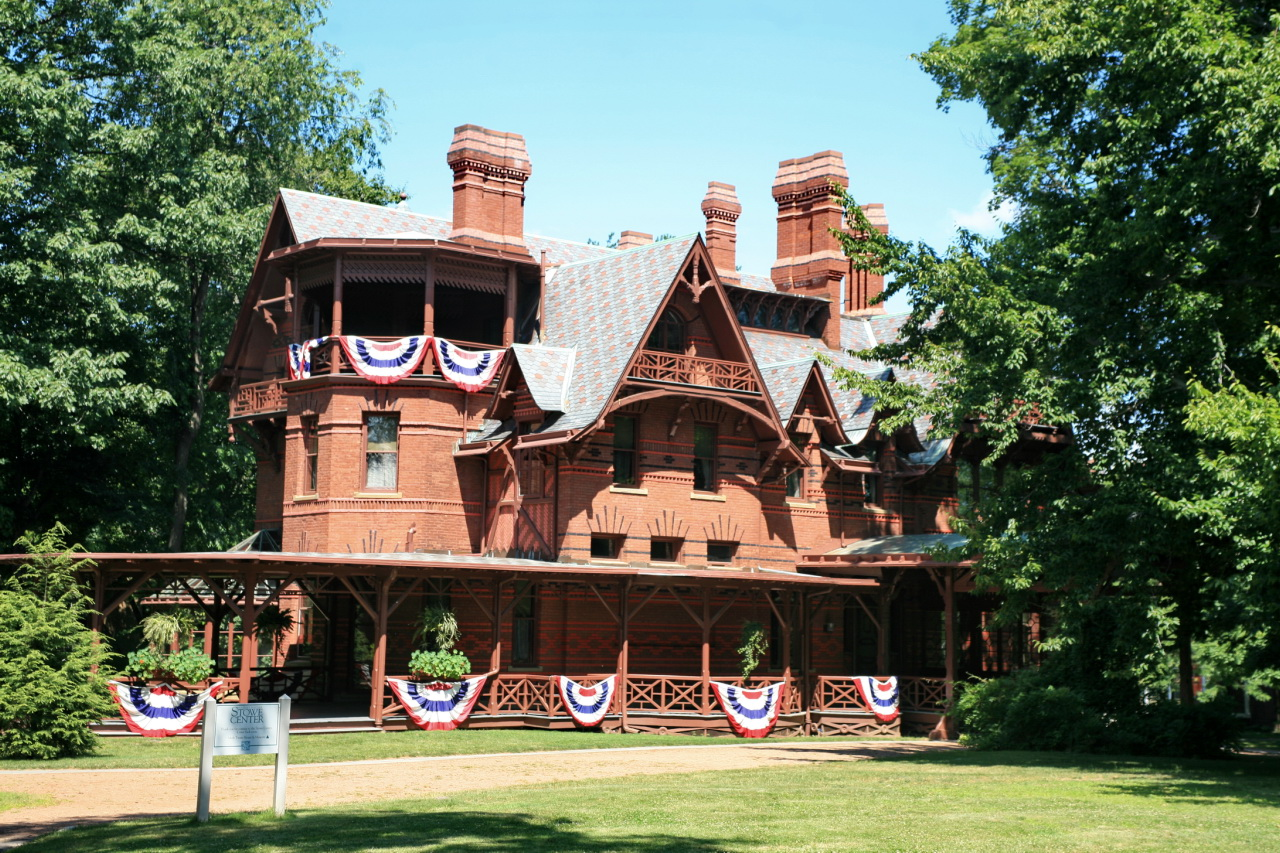
Twain House in Hartford, Connecticut

Twain and Olivia Langdon corresponded throughout 1868. She rejected his first marriage proposal, but Twain continued to court her and managed to overcome her father's initial reluctance. They were married in Elmira, New York, in February 1870. She came from a "wealthy but liberal family"; through her, Twain met abolitionists, "socialists, principled atheists and activists for women's rights and social equality", including Harriet Beecher Stowe, Frederick Douglass, and utopian socialist writer William Dean Howells, who became a long-time friend. The Clemenses lived in Buffalo, New York, from 1869 to 1871. Twain owned a stake in the Buffalo Express newspaper and worked as an editor and writer. While they were living in Buffalo, their son Langdon died of diphtheria in 1872 at the age of 19 months. They had three daughters: Susy (1872–1896), Clara (1874–1962), and Jean (1880–1909). The Clemenses formed a friendship with David Gray, who worked as an editor of the rival Buffalo Courier, and his wife Martha. Twain later wrote that the Grays were "'all the solace' he and Livy had during their 'sorrowful and pathetic brief sojourn in Buffalo'", and that Gray's "delicate gift for poetry" was wasted working for a newspaper.

Starting in 1873, Twain moved his family to Hartford, Connecticut, where he arranged the building of a home next door to Stowe. In the 1870s and 1880s, the family summered at Quarry Farm in Elmira, the home of Olivia's sister, Susan Crane. In 1874, Susan had a study built, an octagonal gazebo set apart from the main house, as a surprise to Twain so that he would have a quiet place in which to write and enjoy his cigars.

Twain wrote many of his classic novels during his 17 years in Hartford (1874–1891) and over 20 summers at Quarry Farm. They include The Adventures of Tom Sawyer (1876), The Prince and the Pauper (1881), Adventures of Huckleberry Finn (1884), and A Connecticut Yankee in King Arthur's Court (1889).

The couple's marriage lasted 34 years until Olivia's death in 1904. All of the Clemens family are buried in Elmira's Woodlawn Cemetery.

=== Love of science and technology ===
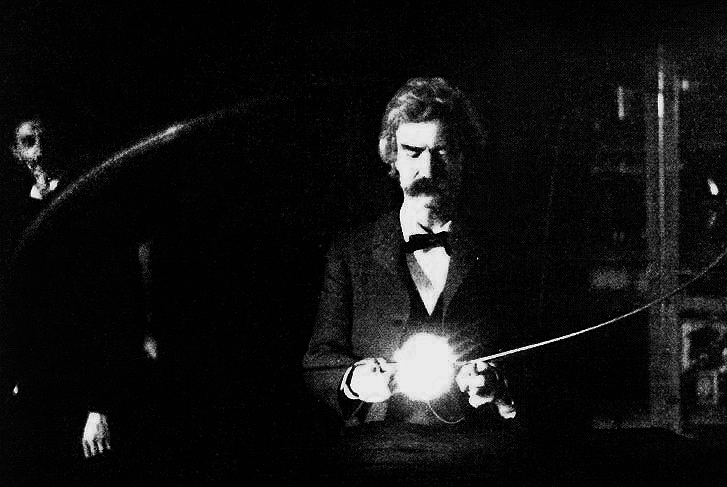
Twain in the laboratory of Nikola Tesla, early 1894

Mark Twain at Stormfield (1909)

Twain was fascinated with science and scientific inquiry. He developed a close and lasting friendship with Nikola Tesla, and the two spent much time together in Tesla's laboratory. Twain patented three inventions, including an "Improvement in Adjustable and Detachable Straps for Garments" (to replace suspenders) and a history trivia game. Most commercially successful was a self-pasting scrapbook; a dried adhesive on the pages needed only to be moistened before use. More than 25,000 were sold.

Twain made fun of the map making process in his "Map of Paris" from 1870.

Twain was an early proponent of fingerprinting as a forensic technique, featuring it in a tall tale in Life on the Mississippi (1883) and as a central plot element in the novel Pudd'nhead Wilson (1894).

Twain's novel A Connecticut Yankee in King Arthur's Court (1889) features a time traveler from the contemporary U.S., using his knowledge of science to introduce modern technology to Arthurian England. This type of historical manipulation became a trope of speculative fiction as alternate histories.

In 1909, Thomas Edison visited Twain at Stormfield, his home in Redding, Connecticut, and filmed him. Part of the footage was used in The Prince and the Pauper (1909), a two-reel short film. It is the only known existing film footage of Twain.

=== Personal and financial affairs ===
Twain made a substantial amount of money through his writing, but he lost a great deal through investments. Twain invested mostly in new inventions and technology, particularly the Paige typesetting machine. It was considered a mechanical marvel that amazed viewers when it worked, but it was prone to breakdowns. Twain spent $300,000 (equivalent to $10,008,621 in 2025) on it between 1880 and 1894, but before it could be perfected, it was rendered obsolete by the Linotype. He lost the bulk of his book profits, as well as a substantial portion of his wife's inheritance.

Twain also lost money through his publishing house, Charles L. Webster and Company, which enjoyed initial success selling the memoirs of Ulysses S. Grant but failed soon afterward, losing money on a biography of Pope Leo XIII. Fewer than 200 copies were sold.

Twain and his family closed down their expensive Hartford home in response to the dwindling income and moved to Europe in June 1891. William M. Laffan of The New York Sun and the McClure Newspaper Syndicate offered him the publication of a series of six European letters. Twain, Olivia, and their daughter Susy were all faced with health problems, and they believed that it would be of benefit to visit European baths. The family stayed mainly in France, Germany, and Italy until May 1895, with longer spells at Berlin (winter 1891–92), Florence (fall and winter 1892–93), and Paris (winters and springs 1893–94 and 1894–95). During that period, Twain returned to New York four times due to his enduring business troubles. Twain rented "a cheap room" in September 1893 at $1.50 per day (equivalent to $54 in 2025) at The Players Club, which he had to keep until March 1894; meanwhile, Twain became "the Belle of New York", in the words of biographer Albert Bigelow Paine.

Twain's writings and lectures enabled him to recover financially, combined with the help of his friend Henry Huttleston Rogers, a principal of Standard Oil whom he met in 1893. Rogers had Twain file for bankruptcy protection in April 1894, then had him transfer the copyrights on his written works to his wife to prevent creditors from gaining possession. Rogers also managed Twain's money until all his creditors were paid.

Twain accepted an offer from Robert Sparrow Smythe and embarked on a year-long around-the-world lecture tour in July 1895 to pay off his creditors in full, although Twain was no longer under any legal obligation to do so. It was a long, arduous journey, and he was sick much of the time, mostly from a cold and a carbuncle. The first part of the itinerary took Twain across northern America to British Columbia, Canada, until the second half of August. For the second part, he sailed across the Pacific Ocean. Twain's scheduled lecture in Honolulu, Hawaii, had to be canceled due to a cholera epidemic. Twain went on to Fiji, Australia, New Zealand, Sri Lanka, India, Mauritius, and South Africa. His three months in India became the centerpiece of his 712-page book Following the Equator. In the second half of July 1896, Twain sailed back to England, completing his circumnavigation of the world begun 14 months before.

Twain and his family spent four more years in Europe, mainly in England and Austria (October 1897 to May 1899), with longer spells in London and Vienna. Clara had wished to study the piano under Theodor Leschetizky in Vienna. However, Jean's health did not benefit from consulting with specialists in Vienna, the "City of Doctors". The family moved to London in spring 1899, following a lead by Poultney Bigelow, who had a good experience being treated by Dr. Jonas Henrik Kellgren, a Swedish osteopathic practitioner in Belgravia. They were persuaded to spend the summer at Kellgren's sanatorium by the lake in the Swedish village of Sanna. Coming back in fall, they continued the treatment in London, until Twain was convinced by lengthy inquiries in America that similar osteopathic expertise was available there.

In mid-1900, Twain was the guest of newspaper proprietor Hugh Gilzean-Reid at Dollis Hill House, located on the north side of London. Twain wrote that he had "never seen any place that was so satisfactorily situated, with its noble trees and stretch of country, and everything that went to make life delightful, and all within a biscuit's throw of the metropolis of the world." Twain then returned to America in October 1900, having earned enough to pay off his debts. In winter 1900/01, Twain became his country's most prominent opponent of imperialism, raising the issue in his speeches, interviews, and writings. In January 1901, Twain began serving as vice-president of the Anti-Imperialist League of New York.

=== Speaking engagements ===
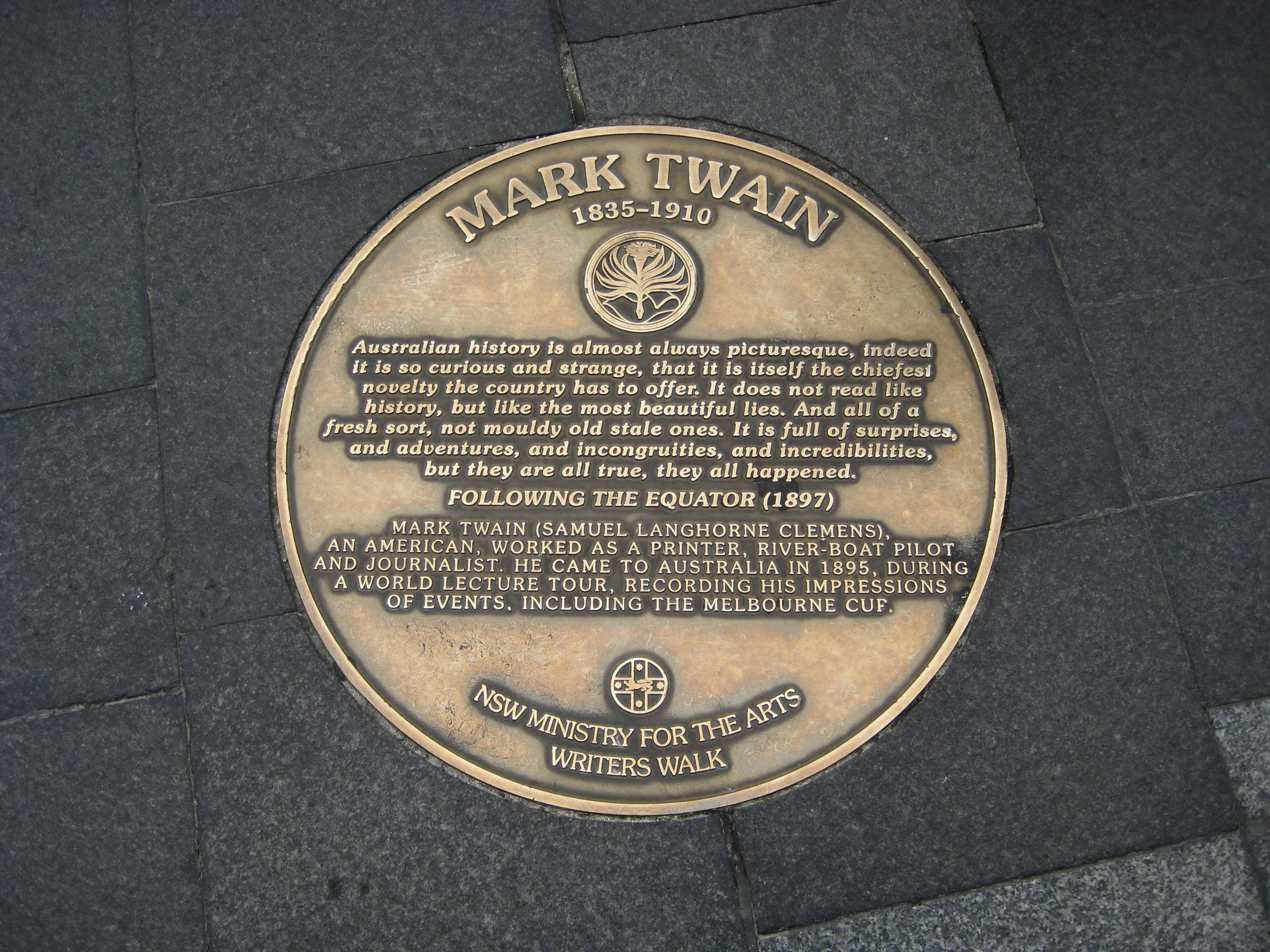
Plaque on Sydney Writers Walk commemorating the visit of Twain in 1895

Twain was in great demand as a featured speaker, performing solo humorous talks similar to modern stand-up comedy. He gave paid talks to many men's clubs, including the Authors' Club, Beefsteak Club, Vagabonds, White Friars, and Monday Evening Club of Hartford.

In the late 1890s, Twain spoke to the Savage Club in London and was elected an honorary member. He was told that only three men had been so honored, including the Prince of Wales, and Twain replied: "Well, it must make the Prince feel mighty fine." He visited Melbourne and Sydney in 1895 as part of a world lecture tour. In 1897, Twain spoke to the Concordia Press Club in Vienna as a special guest, following the diplomat Charlemagne Tower, Jr. He delivered the speech "Die Schrecken der Deutschen Sprache" ("The Horrors of the German Language")—in German—to the great amusement of the audience. In 1901, Twain was invited to speak at Princeton University's Cliosophic Literary Society, where he was made an honorary member. In 1906, he testified in front of a Congressional joint committee in favor of a bill that would extend the length of protection for a copyright to lifetime of the author plus 50 years, stating "I think that will satisfy any reasonable author, because it will take care of his children. Let the grandchildren take care of themselves."

==== Canadian visits ====
In 1881, Twain was honored at a banquet in Montreal, Canada where he made reference to securing a copyright. In 1883, Twain paid a brief visit to Ottawa, and he visited Toronto twice in 1884 and 1885 on a reading tour with George Washington Cable, known as the "Twins of Genius" tour.

The reason for the Toronto visits was to secure Canadian and British copyrights for Twain's upcoming book Adventures of Huckleberry Finn, to which he had alluded in his Montreal visit. The reason for the Ottawa visit had been to secure Canadian and British copyrights for Life on the Mississippi. Publishers in Toronto had printed unauthorized editions of Twain's books at the time, before an international copyright agreement was established in 1891. These were sold in the United States as well as in Canada, depriving him of royalties. Twain estimated that Belford Brothers' edition of The Adventures of Tom Sawyer alone had cost him $10,000 (equivalent to $360,000 in 2025). He had unsuccessfully attempted to secure the rights for The Prince and the Pauper in 1881, in conjunction with his Montreal trip. Eventually, Twain received legal advice to register a copyright in Canada (for both Canada and Britain) prior to publishing in the United States, which would restrain the Canadian publishers from printing a version when the American edition was published. There was a requirement that a copyright be registered to a Canadian resident; Twain addressed this by his short visits to the country.

=== Later life and death ===
The report of my death was an exaggeration. — Twain, 1897

In his later years, Twain lived at 14 West 10th Street in Manhattan. He passed through a period of deep depression which began in 1896 when his daughter Susy died of meningitis. Olivia's death in 1904 and Jean's on December 24, 1909, deepened Twain's gloom. On May 20, 1909, his close friend Henry Rogers died suddenly.

In April 1906, Twain heard that his friend Ina Coolbrith had lost nearly all that she owned in the 1906 San Francisco earthquake, and he volunteered a few autographed portrait photographs to be sold for her benefit. To further aid Coolbrith, George Wharton James visited Twain in New York and arranged for a new portrait session. Twain was resistant initially, but he eventually admitted that four of the resulting images were the finest ones ever taken of him. In September, Twain started publishing chapters from his autobiography in the North American Review. The same year, Charlotte Teller, a writer living with her grandmother at 3 Fifth Avenue, began an acquaintanceship with him which "lasted several years and may have included romantic intentions" on his part.

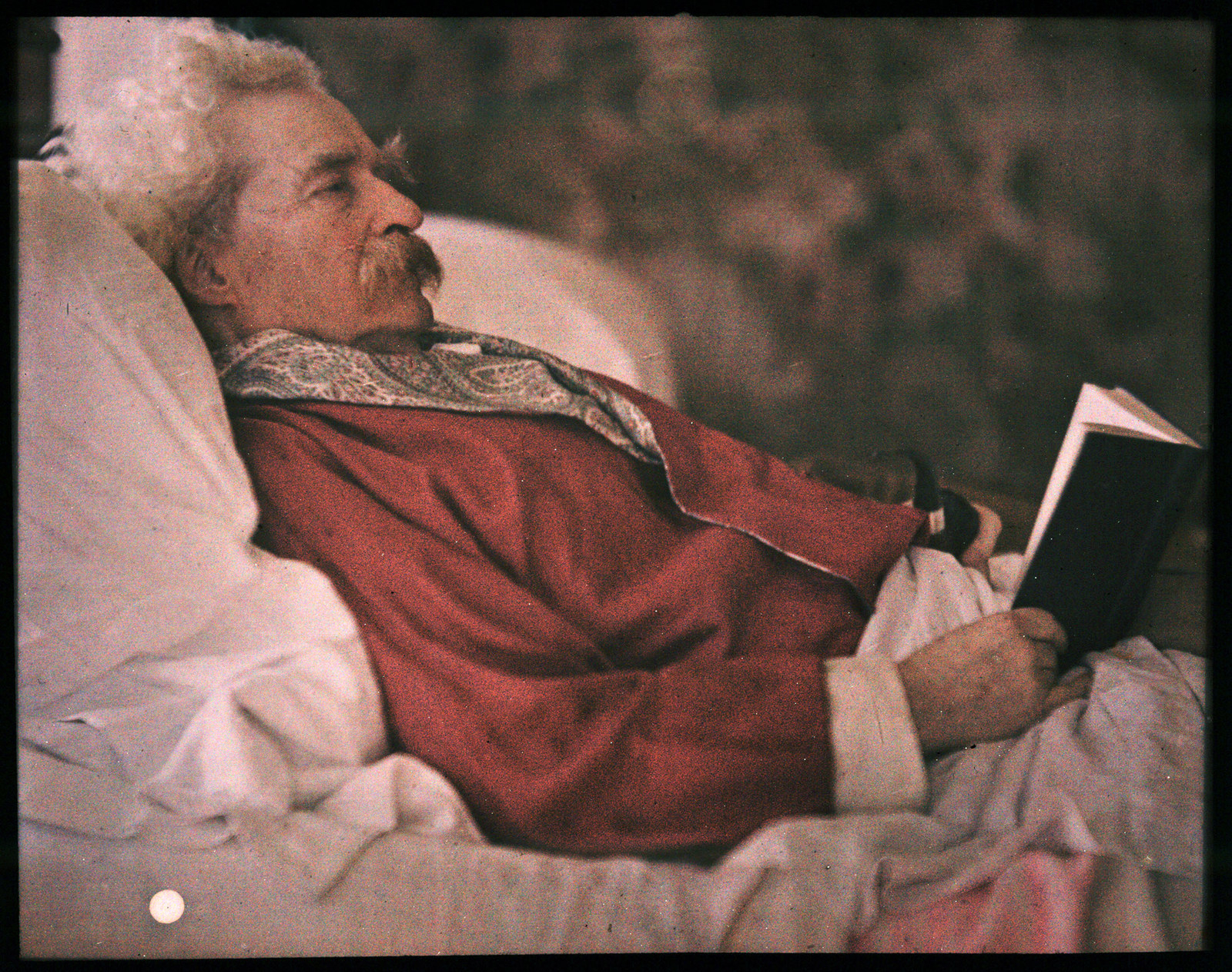
Twain photographed in 1908 via the Autochrome Lumiere process

In 1906, Twain formed the Angel Fish and Aquarium Club, for girls whom he viewed as surrogate granddaughters. Its dozen or so members ranged in age from 10 to 16. Twain exchanged letters with his "Angel Fish" girls and invited them to concerts and the theater and to play games. Twain wrote in 1908 that the club was his "life's chief delight". In 1907, he met Dorothy Quick (then age 11) on a transatlantic crossing, beginning "a friendship that was to last until the very day of his death".

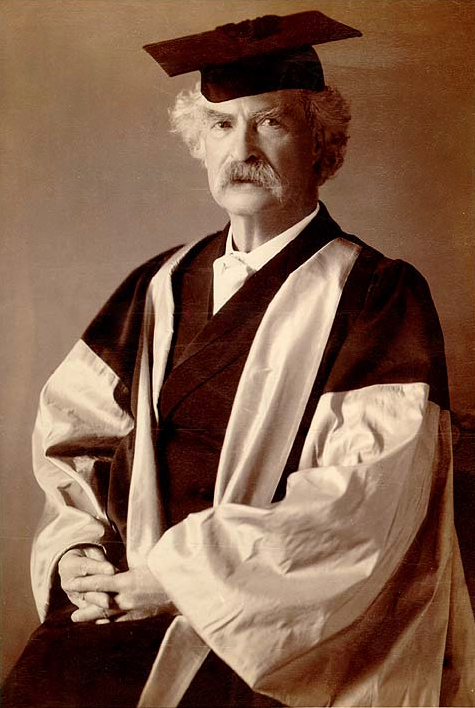
Twain in academic regalia for acceptance of the D.Litt. degree awarded to him by Oxford University in 1907

Twain was awarded an Honorary Causa Doctor of Letters (Litt.D.) by Yale University in 1901 and a Doctor of Law (Ll.D) by the University of Missouri in 1902 and Oxford University awarded him in 1907.

Twain was born two weeks after Halley's Comet's closest approach in 1835; he said in 1909:

I came in with Halley's Comet in 1835. It is coming again next year, and I expect to go out with it. It will be the greatest disappointment of my life if I don't go out with Halley's Comet. The Almighty has said, no doubt: "Now here are these two unaccountable freaks; they came in together, they must go out together".

Twain's prediction was eerily accurate; he died of a heart attack on April 21, 1910, in Stormfield, one day after the comet was at its closest to the Sun and a month before the comet passed the Earth.

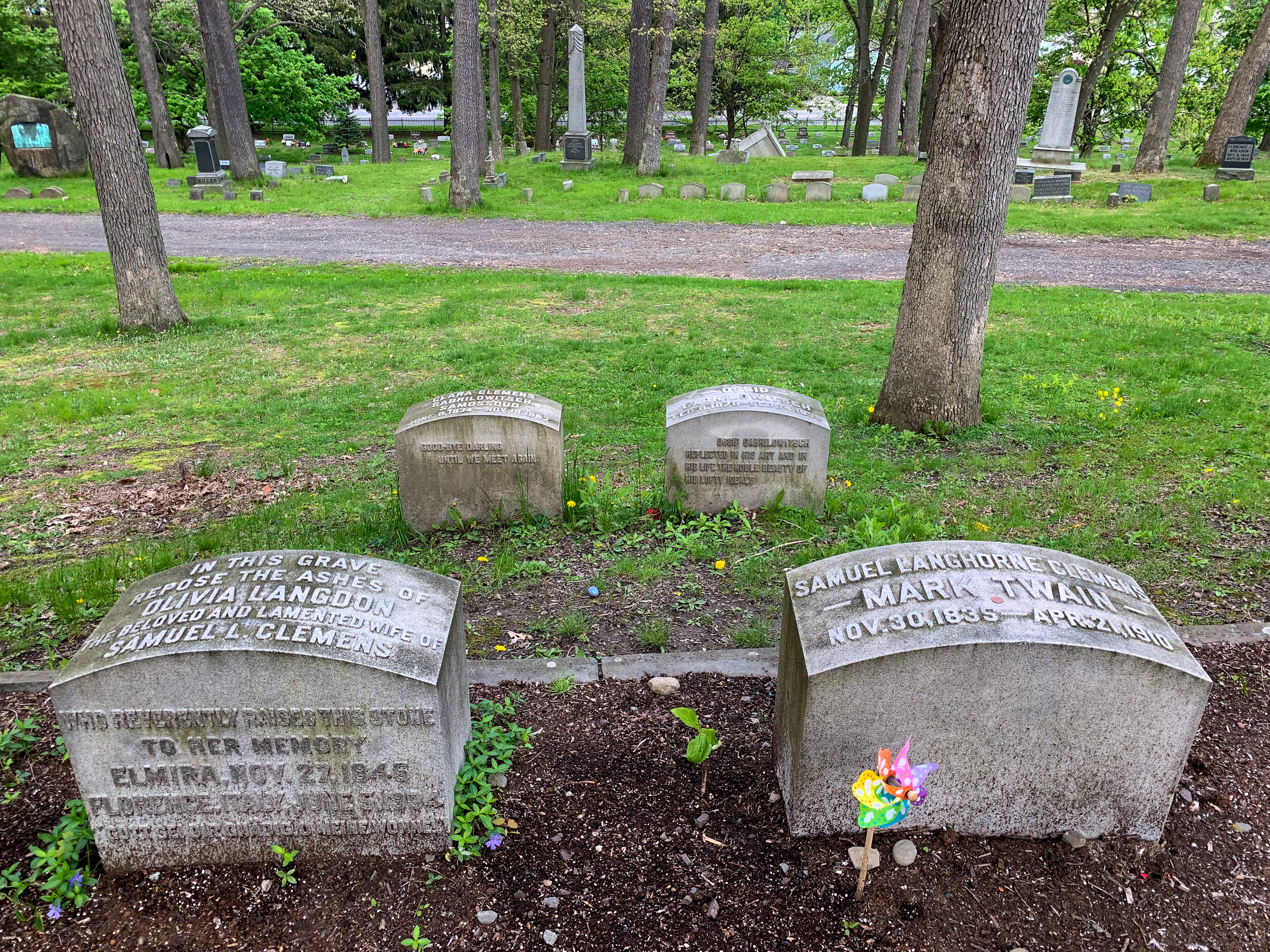
Twain and his wife are buried side by side in Elmira's Woodlawn Cemetery

Upon hearing of Twain's death, President William Howard Taft said:

Mark Twain gave pleasure – real intellectual enjoyment – to millions, and his works will continue to give such pleasure to millions yet to come ... His humor was American, but he was nearly as much appreciated by Englishmen and people of other countries as by his own countrymen. He has made an enduring part of American literature.

Twain's funeral was at the Brick Presbyterian Church on Fifth Avenue, New York. He is buried in his wife's family plot at Woodlawn Cemetery in Elmira, New York. The Langdon family plot is marked by a 12-foot (3.7 m) monument (two fathoms, or "mark twain") placed there by Twain's surviving daughter Clara. There is also a smaller headstone. He expressed a preference for cremation (for example, in Life on the Mississippi), but he acknowledged that his surviving family would have the last word.

Officials in Connecticut and New York estimated the value of Twain's estate at $471,000 ($12,000,000 in 2025).

== Writing ==
=== Overview ===
Twain began his career writing light, humorous verse, but he became a chronicler of the vanities, hypocrisies, and murderous acts of mankind. At mid-career, Twain combined rich humor, sturdy narrative, and social criticism in Huckleberry Finn. He was a master of rendering colloquial speech and helped to create and popularize a distinctive American literature built on American themes and language.

Many of Twain's works have been suppressed at times for various reasons. The Adventures of Huckleberry Finn has been repeatedly restricted in American high schools, not least for its frequent use of the word "nigger", a slur commonly used for Black people in the nineteenth century.

A complete bibliography of Twain's works is nearly impossible to compile because of the vast number of pieces he wrote (often in obscure newspapers) and his use of several different pen names. Additionally, a large portion of Twain's speeches and lectures have been lost or were not recorded; thus, the compilation of his works is an ongoing process. Researchers have rediscovered published material as recently as 1995 and 2015.

=== Early journalism and travelogues ===
Twain was writing for the Virginia City newspaper the Territorial Enterprise in 1863 when he met lawyer Tom Fitch, editor of the competing newspaper Virginia Daily Union and known as the "silver-tongued orator of the Pacific". Twain credited Fitch with giving him his "first really profitable lesson" in writing. "When I first began to lecture, and in my earlier writings," Twain later commented, "my sole idea was to make comic capital out of everything I saw and heard." In 1866, he presented his lecture on the Sandwich Islands to a crowd in Washoe City, Nevada. Afterwards, Fitch told him:

Clemens, your lecture was magnificent. It was eloquent, moving, sincere. Never in my entire life have I listened to such a magnificent piece of descriptive narration. But you committed one unpardonable sin – the unpardonable sin. It is a sin you must never commit again. You closed a most eloquent description, by which you had keyed your audience up to a pitch of the intensest interest, with a piece of atrocious anti-climax which nullified all the really fine effect you had produced.

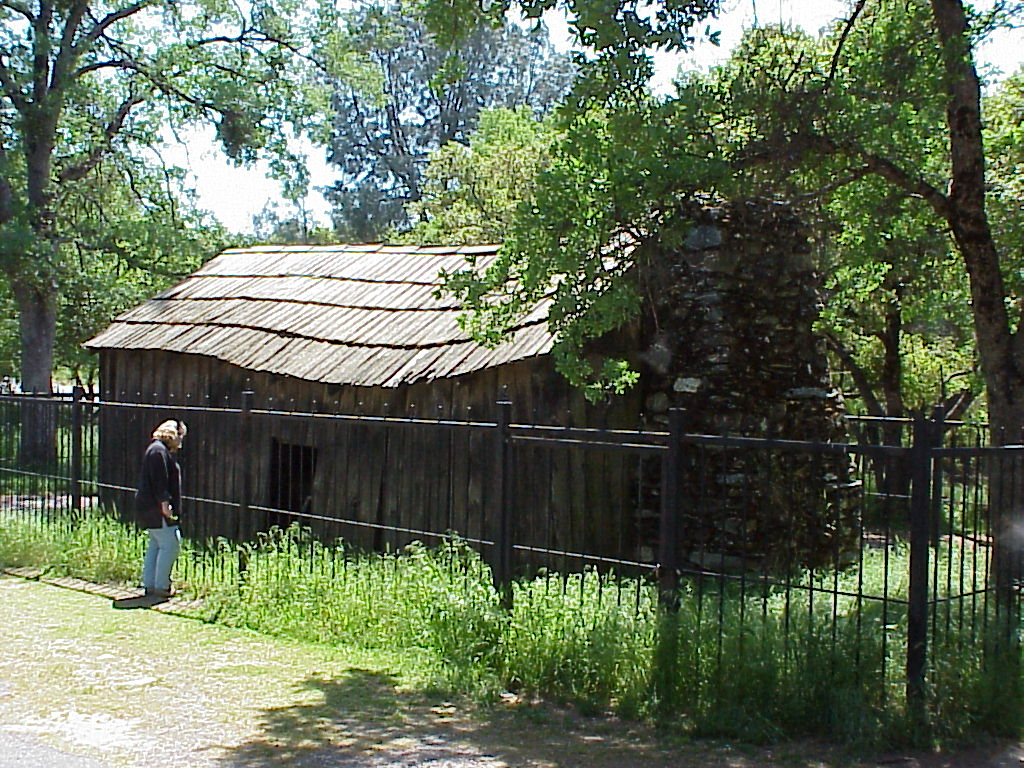
Cabin where Twain wrote "Jumping Frog of Calaveras County", Jackass Hill, Tuolumne County. Click on historical marker and interior view.

It was in these days that Twain became a writer of the Sagebrush School; he was known later as its most famous member. Twain's first important work was "The Celebrated Jumping Frog of Calaveras County," published in the New York Saturday Press on November 18, 1865. After a burst of popularity, the Sacramento Union commissioned him to write letters about his travel experiences. The first journey that Twain took for this job was to ride the steamer Ajax on its maiden voyage to the Sandwich Islands (Hawaii). All the while, he was writing letters to the newspaper that were meant for publishing, chronicling his experiences with humor. These letters proved to be the genesis to Twain's work with the San Francisco Alta California newspaper, which designated him a traveling correspondent for a trip from San Francisco to New York City via the Panama isthmus.

On June 8, 1867, Twain set sail on the pleasure cruiser Quaker City for five months, and this trip resulted in The Innocents Abroad or The New Pilgrims' Progress. In 1872, he published his second piece of travel literature, Roughing It, as an account of his journey from Missouri to Nevada, his subsequent life in the American West, and his visit to Hawaii. The book lampoons American and Western society in the same way that Innocents critiqued the various countries of Europe and the Middle East. Twain's next work was The Gilded Age: A Tale of Today, his first attempt at writing a novel. The book, written with Twain's neighbor Charles Dudley Warner, is also his only collaboration.

Twain's next work drew on his experiences on the Mississippi River. Old Times on the Mississippi was a series of sketches published in the Atlantic Monthly in 1875 featuring his disillusionment with Romanticism. Old Times eventually became the starting point for Life on the Mississippi.

=== Tom Sawyer and Huckleberry Finn ===
Twain's next major publication was The Adventures of Tom Sawyer, which draws on his youth in Hannibal. Tom Sawyer was modeled on Twain as a child, with traces of schoolmates John Briggs and Will Bowen. The book also introduces Huckleberry Finn in a supporting role, based on Twain's boyhood friend Tom Blankenship.

The Prince and the Pauper was not as well received, despite a storyline that is common in film and literature today. The book tells the story of two boys born on the same day who are physically identical, acting as a social commentary as the prince and pauper switch places. Twain had started Adventures of Huckleberry Finn (which he consistently had problems completing) and had completed his travel book A Tramp Abroad, which describes his travels through central and southern Europe.

Twain's next major published work was the Adventures of Huckleberry Finn, which confirmed him as a noteworthy American writer. Some have called it the first Great American Novel, and the book has become required reading in many schools throughout the United States. Huckleberry Finn was an offshoot from Tom Sawyer and had a more serious tone than its predecessor. Four hundred manuscript pages were written in mid-1876, right after the publication of Tom Sawyer. The last fifth of Huckleberry Finn is subject to much controversy. Some say that Twain experienced a "failure of nerve," as critic Leo Marx puts it. Ernest Hemingway once said of Huckleberry Finn:

If you read it, you must stop where the Nigger Jim is stolen from the boys. That is the real end. The rest is just cheating.

Hemingway also wrote in the same essay:

All modern American literature comes from one book by Mark Twain called Huckleberry Finn.

Near the completion of Huckleberry Finn, Twain wrote Life on the Mississippi, which is said to have heavily influenced the novel. The travel work recounts Twain's memories and new experiences after a 22-year absence from the Mississippi River. In it, he also explains that "Mark Twain" was the call made when the boat was in safe water, indicating a depth of two (or twain) fathoms (12 feet or 3.7 metres).

McDowell's cave—now known as Mark Twain Cave in Hannibal, Missouri, and frequently mentioned in Twain's book The Adventures of Tom Sawyer—has "Sam Clemens", Twain's real name, engraved on the wall by Twain himself.

=== Later writing ===
Twain produced President Ulysses S. Grant's Memoirs through his fledgling publishing house, Charles L. Webster and Company, which he co-owned with Charles L. Webster, his nephew by marriage.

At this time, Twain also wrote "The Private History of a Campaign That Failed" for The Century Magazine. This piece detailed his two-week stint in a Confederate militia during the Civil War. Twain next focused on A Connecticut Yankee in King Arthur's Court, written with the same historical fiction style as The Prince and the Pauper. A Connecticut Yankee shows the absurdities of political and social norms by setting them in the court of King Arthur. The book was started in December 1885, then shelved a few months later until the summer of 1887, and eventually finished in the spring of 1889.

Twain's next large-scale work was Pudd'nhead Wilson, which he wrote rapidly, as he was desperately trying to stave off bankruptcy. From November 12 to December 14, 1893, Twain wrote 60,000 words for the novel. Critics have pointed to this rushed completion as the cause of the novel's rough organization and constant disruption of the plot. This novel also contains the tale of two boys born on the same day who switch positions in life, like The Prince and the Pauper. It was first published serially in Century Magazine, and when it was finally published in book form, Pudd'nhead Wilson appeared as the main title; however, the "subtitles" make the entire title read The Tragedy of Pudd'nhead Wilson and the Comedy of The Extraordinary Twins.

Twain's next venture was a work of straight fiction that he called Personal Recollections of Joan of Arc and dedicated to his wife. Twain said a year before his death that this was the work that he was most proud of, despite the criticism that he received for it, writing: "I like Joan of Arc best of all my books; and it is the best; I know it perfectly well. And besides, it furnished me seven times the pleasure afforded me by any of the others; twelve years of preparation, and two years of writing. The others needed no preparation and got none." The book had been a dream of Twain's since childhood, and he claimed that he had found a manuscript detailing the life of Joan of Arc when Twain was an adolescent. It was written at the time of his bankruptcy and Twain was convinced that it would save his financial disposition. Twain specifically insisted it to be an anonymous publication so that readers would take it as a serious historical account. With the help of his financial adviser Henry Huttleston Rogers, it was published anonymously in serials in the Harper's Magazine in 1895.

To meet mounting financial obligations and subsidize his failing business ventures, Twain increased his literary output, including articles and commentary, yet these efforts proved insufficient to reverse the declining profitability of his investments. He filed for bankruptcy in 1894. During this time of dire financial straits, Twain published several literary reviews in newspapers to help make ends meet. He famously derided James Fenimore Cooper in his article detailing Cooper's "Literary Offenses". Twain became an extremely outspoken critic of other authors and other critics; he suggested that, before praising Cooper's work, Thomas Lounsbury, Brander Matthews, and Wilkie Collins "ought to have read some of it".

George Eliot, Jane Austen, and Robert Louis Stevenson also fell under Twain's attack during this time period, beginning around 1890 and continuing until his death. Twain outlines what he considers to be "quality writing" in several letters and essays, in addition to providing a source for the "tooth and claw" style of literary criticism. Twain places emphasis on concision, utility of word choice, and realism; he complains, for example, that Cooper's Deerslayer purports to be realistic but has several shortcomings. Ironically, several of Twain's own works were later criticized for lack of continuity (Adventures of Huckleberry Finn) and organization (Pudd'nhead Wilson).

Twain's wife died in 1904 while the couple were staying at the Villa di Quarto in Florence. After some time had passed, he published some works that his wife, his de facto editor and censor throughout her married life, had looked down upon. The Mysterious Stranger is perhaps the best known, depicting various visits of Satan to earth. This particular work was not published in Twain's lifetime. His manuscripts included three versions, written between 1897 and 1905: the so-called Hannibal, Eseldorf, and Print Shop versions. The resulting confusion led to extensive publication of a jumbled version, and only recently have the original versions become available as Twain wrote them. 1916 saw the publication of N.C. Wyeth's celebrated illustrated edition.

Twain's last work was his autobiography, which he dictated and thought would be most entertaining if he went off on whims and tangents in non-chronological order. Some archivists and compilers have rearranged the biography into a more conventional form, thereby eliminating some of Twain's humor and the flow of the book. The first volume of the autobiography, over 736 pages, was published by the University of California in November 2010, 100 years after his death, as Twain wished. It soon became an unexpected best-seller, making Twain one of a very few authors publishing new best-selling volumes in the 19th, 20th, and 21st centuries.

=== Censorship ===
Twain's works have been subjected to censorship efforts. According to Stuart (2013), "Leading these banning campaigns, generally, were religious organizations or individuals in positions of influence – not so much working librarians, who had been instilled with that American "library spirit" which honored intellectual freedom (within bounds of course)". In 1905, the Brooklyn Public Library banned both The Adventures of Huckleberry Finn and The Adventures of Tom Sawyer from the children's department because of their language.

=== Publishers ===
For two decades, Twain lived in a house in Hartford, Connecticut (1871–1891), and the American Publishing Company in that city published the first edition of several of his books. The same can be said about a number of New York City-based companies, such as Harper & Brothers and his nephew's Charles L. Webster and Company. Other memorable editions were created by The Ash Ranch Press of San Diego and Barry Moser's Pennyroyal Press.

== Views ==
Twain's views became more radical as he grew older. In a letter to friend and fellow writer William Dean Howells in 1887, Twain acknowledged that his views had changed and developed over his lifetime, referring to one of his favorite works:

When I finished Carlyle's French Revolution in 1871, I was a Girondin; every time I have read it since, I have read it differently – being influenced and changed, little by little, by life and environment ... and now I lay the book down once more, and recognize that I am a Sansculotte! And not a pale, characterless Sansculotte, but a Marat.

=== Politics ===
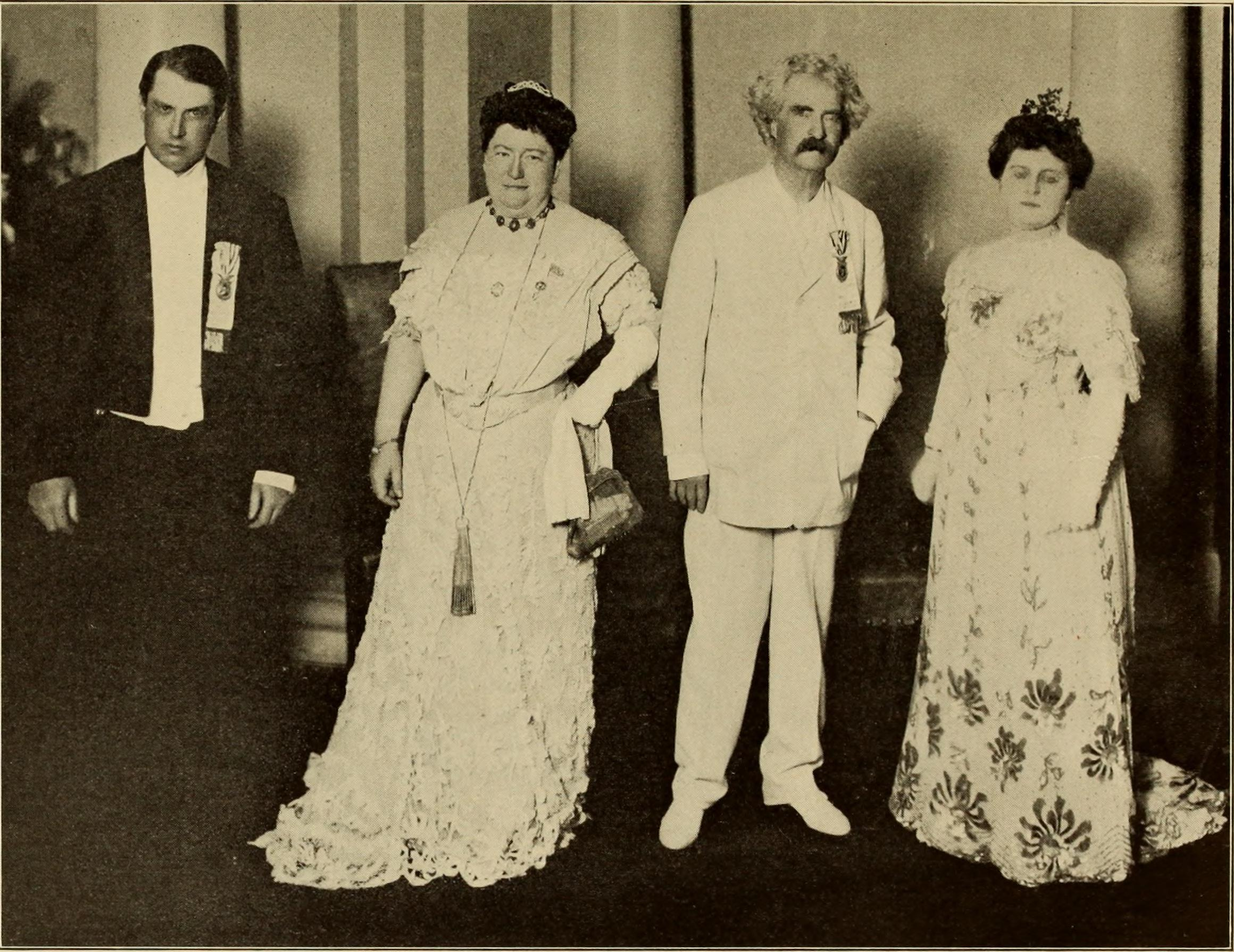
Twain (second from right) with NSDAR President General Emily Nelson Ritchie McLean at the Jamestown Exposition in Norfolk, Virginia, in 1907

In the opinion of Washington University professor Guy A. Cardwell:

By present standards Mark Twain was more conservative than liberal. He believed strongly in laissez faire, thought personal political rights secondary to property rights, admired self-made plutocrats, and advocated a leadership to be composed of men of wealth and brains. Among his attitudes now more readily recognized as liberal were a faith in progress through technology and a hostility towards monarchy, inherited aristocracy, the Roman Catholic church, and, in his later years, imperialism.

Twain was a staunch supporter of technological progress and commerce. He is not on record as advocating welfare measures, which his biographer Louis Budd surmises was due to a belief that society in the "business age" is governed by "exact and constant" laws that should not be "interfered with for the accommodation of any individual or political or religious faction". Twain opined that "there is no good government at all & none possible".

==== Labor ====
Twain wrote glowingly about unions in the river boating industry in Life on the Mississippi, which was read in union halls decades later. He supported the labor movement, especially one of the most important unions, the Knights of Labor. In a speech to them, Twain said:

Who are the oppressors? The few: the King, the capitalist, and a handful of other overseers and superintendents. Who are the oppressed? The many: the nations of the earth; the valuable personages; the workers; they that make the bread that the soft-handed and idle eat.

Twain further wrote "Why is it right that there is not a fairer division of the spoil all around? Because laws and constitutions have ordered otherwise. Then it follows that laws and constitutions should change around and say there shall be a more nearly equal division."

==== Imperialism ====
Before 1899, Twain was largely in favor of imperialism. In the late 1860s and early 1870s, he spoke out strongly in favor of American interests in the Hawaiian Islands. Twain said the war with Spain in 1898 was "the worthiest" war ever fought. However, he reversed course in 1899. In the New York Herald, October 16, 1900, Twain describes his transformation and political awakening, in the context of the Philippine–American War, to anti-imperialism:

I wanted the American eagle to go screaming into the Pacific ... Why not spread its wings over the Philippines, I asked myself? ... I said to myself, Here are a people who have suffered for three centuries. We can make them as free as ourselves, give them a government and country of their own, put a miniature of the American Constitution afloat in the Pacific, start a brand new republic to take its place among the free nations of the world. It seemed to me a great task to which we had addressed ourselves.

But I have thought some more, since then, and I have read carefully the treaty of Paris (which ended the Spanish–American War), and I have seen that we do not intend to free, but to subjugate the people of the Philippines. We have gone there to conquer, not to redeem.

It should, it seems to me, be our pleasure and duty to make those people free, and let them deal with their own domestic questions in their own way. And so I am an anti-imperialist. I am opposed to having the eagle put its talons on any other land.

During the Boxer Rebellion, Twain said that "the Boxer is a patriot. He loves his country better than he does the countries of other people. I wish him success."

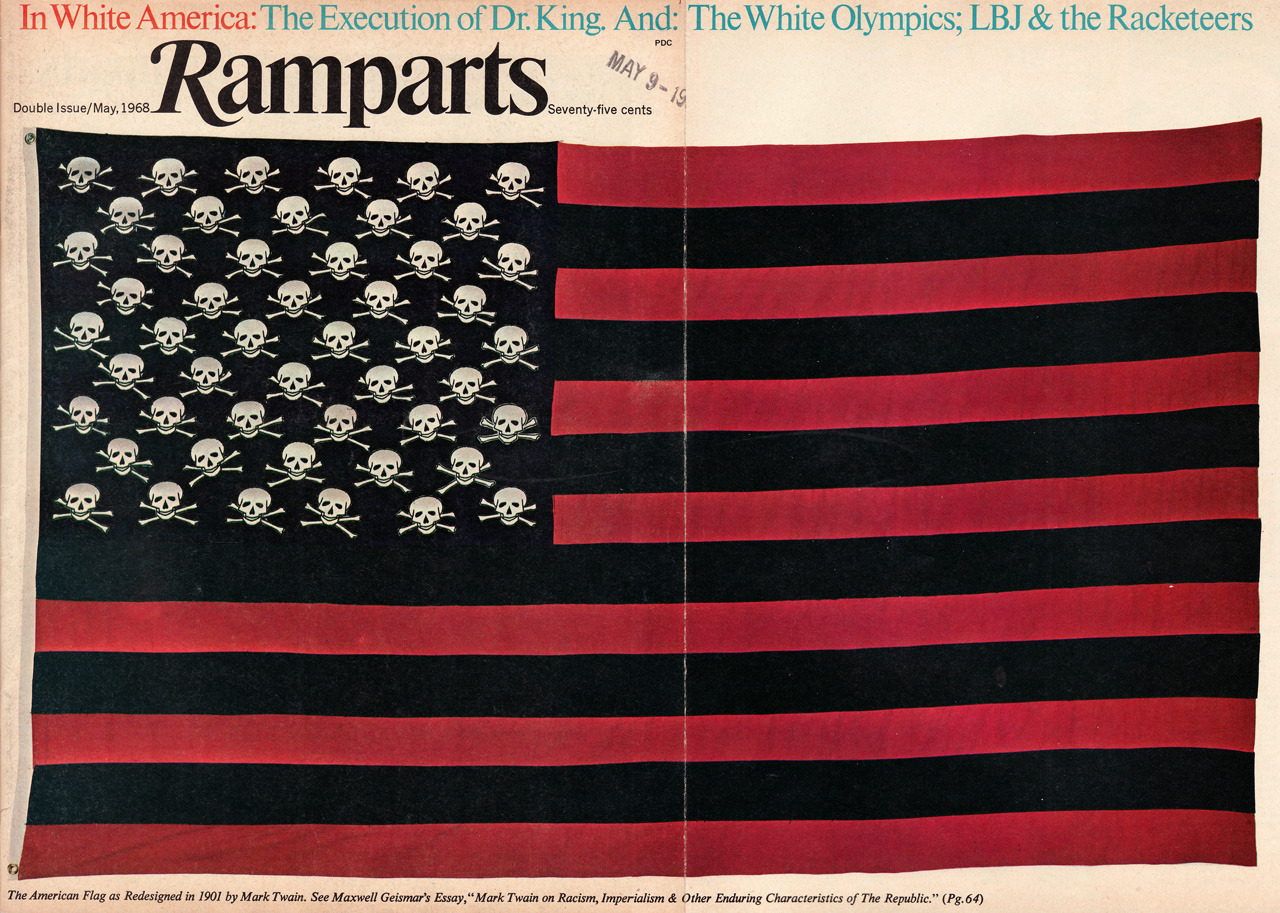
In 1901, Twain wrote a satirical essay titled To the Person Sitting in Darkness, in which he expressed his strong anti-imperialist views against ongoing conflicts such as the Boxer Rebellion, the Second Boer War and the Philippine–American War. At one point in the essay, Twain made a sardonic suggestion for a flag of the Philippines under American control; "And as for a flag for the Philippine Province, it is easily managed. We can have a special one—our States do it: we can have just our usual flag, with the white stripes painted black and the stars replaced by the skull and cross-bones."

From 1901, soon after his return from Europe, until his death in 1910, Twain was vice-president of the American Anti-Imperialist League, which opposed the annexation of the Philippines by the United States and had "tens of thousands of members". He wrote many political pamphlets for the organization. The Incident in the Philippines, posthumously published in 1924, was in response to the Moro Crater Massacre, in which 600 Moros were killed. Twain wrote: "In what way was it a battle? It has no resemblance to a battle...We cleaned up our four days' work and made it complete by butchering these helpless people." Many of his neglected and previously uncollected writings on anti-imperialism appeared for the first time in book form in 1992.

Twain was critical of imperialism in other countries as well. In Following the Equator, Twain expresses "hatred and condemnation of imperialism of all stripes". He was highly critical of European imperialists such as Cecil Rhodes and King Leopold II of Belgium, both of whom attempted to establish colonies on the African continent during the Scramble for Africa. King Leopold's Soliloquy is a political satire about the monarch's private colony, the Congo Free State. Reports of outrageous exploitation and grotesque abuses led to widespread international outcry in the early 1900s, arguably the first large-scale human rights movement. In the soliloquy, the King argues that bringing Christianity to the colony outweighs "a little starvation". The abuses against Congolese forced laborers continued until the movement forced the Belgian government to take direct control of the colony.

During the Philippine–American War, Twain wrote a short pacifist story titled The War Prayer, which makes the point that humanism and Christianity's preaching of love are incompatible with the conduct of war. It was submitted to Harper's Bazaar for publication, but on March 22, 1905, the magazine rejected the story as "not quite suited to a woman's magazine". Eight days later, Twain wrote to his friend Daniel Carter Beard, to whom he had read the story, "I don't think the prayer will be published in my time. None but the dead are permitted to tell the truth." Because he had an exclusive contract with Harper & Brothers, Twain could not publish The War Prayer elsewhere; it remained unpublished until 1916. It was republished in the 1960s as campaigning material by anti-war activists.

Twain acknowledged that he had originally sympathized with the more moderate Girondins of the French Revolution and then shifted his sympathies to the more radical Sansculottes, indeed identifying himself as "a Marat" and writing that the Reign of Terror paled in comparison to the older terrors that preceded it. Twain supported the revolutionaries in Russia against the reformists, arguing that the Tsar must be got rid of by violent means, because peaceful ones would not work. He summed up his views of revolutions in the following statement:

I am said to be a revolutionist in my sympathies, by birth, by breeding and by principle. I am always on the side of the revolutionists, because there never was a revolution unless there were some oppressive and intolerable conditions against which to revolute.

==== Civil rights ====
Twain was an adamant supporter of the abolition of slavery and the emancipation of slaves, even going so far as to say, "Lincoln's Proclamation ... not only set the black slaves free, but set the white man free also". He argued that non-whites did not receive justice in the United States, once saying, "I have seen Chinamen abused and maltreated in all the mean, cowardly ways possible to the invention of a degraded nature ... but I never saw a Chinaman righted in a court of justice for wrongs thus done to him". Twain paid for at least one black person to attend Yale Law School and for another black person to attend a southern university to become a minister.

Twain was also a supporter of women's suffrage, as evidenced by his "Votes for Women" speech, given in 1901.

Helen Keller benefited from Twain's support as she pursued her college education and publishing despite her disabilities and financial limitations. The two were friends for roughly 16 years.

Through Twain's efforts, the Connecticut legislature voted a pension for Prudence Crandall, since 1995 Connecticut's official heroine, for her efforts towards the education of young African-American women in Connecticut. Twain also offered to purchase for her use her former house in Canterbury, home of the Canterbury Female Boarding School, but she declined.

At 62, Twain wrote in his travelogue Following the Equator (1897) that in colonized lands all over the world, "savages" have always been wronged by "whites" in the most merciless ways, such as "robbery, humiliation, and slow, slow murder, through poverty and the white man's whiskey"; his conclusion is that "there are many humorous things in this world; among them the white man's notion that he is less savage than the other savages". Describing his travels, Twain wrote, "So far as I am able to judge nothing has been left undone, either by man or Nature, to make India the most extraordinary country that the sun visits on his rounds. Where every prospect pleases, and only man is vile."

==== Native Americans ====
Twain's earlier writings on American Indians reflected his view of essentialized racial difference. Twain wrote in "The Noble Red Man" in 1870:

His heart is a cesspool of falsehood, of treachery, and of low and devilish instincts. With him, gratitude is an unknown emotion; and when one does him a kindness, it is safest to keep the face toward him, lest the reward be an arrow in the back. To accept of a favor from him is to assume a debt which you can never repay to his satisfaction, though you bankrupt yourself trying. The scum of the earth!

In the same tract, Twain advocates genocide, describing the "Noble Aborigine" as : "nothing but a poor filthy, naked scurvy vagabond, whom to exterminate were a charity to the Creator's worthier insects and reptiles which he oppresses". This piece sought to undermine the sympathy felt on the "Atlantic seabord" for Native Americans. In 1895, Twain was still ridiculing the author of Last of the Mohicans, saying in "Fenimore Cooper's Literary Offenses" that Cooper "[...] was almost always in error about his Indians. There was seldom a sane one among them."

==== Political parties ====
Twain was a Republican for most of his life. However, in 1884, Twain publicly broke with his party and joined the Mugwumps to support the Democratic nominee, Grover Cleveland, over the Republican nominee, James G. Blaine, whom he considered a corrupt politician. Twain spoke at rallies in favor of Cleveland. In the early 20th century, Twain began decrying both Democrats and Republicans as "insane" and proposed, in his 1907 book Christian Science, that while each party recognized the other's insanity, only the Mugwumps (that is, those who eschewed party loyalties in favor of voting for "the best man") could perceive the overall madness linking the two.

=== Religion ===
Twain was a Presbyterian. He was critical of organized religion and certain elements of Christianity through his later life. For example, Twain wrote, "Faith is believing what you know ain't so", and "If Christ were here now there is one thing he would not be – a Christian". With anti-Catholic sentiment rampant in 19th century America, Twain noted that he had been "educated to enmity toward everything that is Catholic". As an adult, Twain engaged in religious discussions and attended services, his theology developing as Twain wrestled with the deaths of loved ones and with his own mortality.

Twain generally avoided publishing his most controversial opinions on religion in his lifetime, and they are known from essays and stories that were published later. In the essay Three Statements of the Eighties in the 1880s, Twain stated that he believed in an almighty God, but not in any messages, revelations, holy scriptures such as the Bible, Providence, or retribution in the afterlife. Twain did state that "the goodness, the justice, and the mercy of God are manifested in His works", but also that "the universe is governed by strict and immutable laws", which determine "small matters", such as who dies in a pestilence. At other times, he plainly professed a belief in Providence. In some later writings in the 1890s, Twain was less optimistic about the goodness of God, observing that "if our Maker is all-powerful for good or evil, He is not in His right mind". At other times, he conjectured sardonically that perhaps God had created the world with all its tortures for some purpose of His own, but was otherwise indifferent to humanity, which was too petty and insignificant to deserve His attention anyway.

In 1901, Twain criticized the actions of the missionary Dr. William Scott Ament (1851–1909) because Ament and other missionaries had collected indemnities from Chinese subjects in the aftermath of the Boxer uprising of 1900. Twain's response to hearing of Ament's methods was published in the North American Review in February 1901: To the Person Sitting in Darkness, and deals with examples of imperialism in China, South Africa, and with the U.S. occupation of the Philippines. A subsequent article, "To My Missionary Critics" published in The North American Review in April 1901, unapologetically continues his attack, but with the focus shifted from Ament to his missionary superiors, the American Board of Commissioners for Foreign Missions.

After his death, Twain's family suppressed some of his work that was especially irreverent toward conventional religion, including Letters from the Earth, which was not published until his daughter Clara reversed her position in 1962 in response to Soviet propaganda about the withholding. The anti-religious The Mysterious Stranger was published in 1916. Little Bessie, a story ridiculing Christianity, was first published in the 1972 collection Mark Twain's Fables of Man.

Twain raised money to build a Presbyterian Church in Nevada in 1864.

Twain created a reverent portrayal of Joan of Arc, a subject over which he had obsessed for forty years, studied for a dozen years and spent two years writing about. In 1900 and again in 1908, Twain stated, "I like Joan of Arc best of all my books, it is the best".

Those who knew Twain well late in life recount that he dwelt on the subject of the afterlife, his daughter Clara saying: "Sometimes he believed death ended everything, but most of the time he felt sure of a life beyond."

Twain's frankest views on religion appeared in his final work Autobiography of Mark Twain, the publication of which started in November 2010, 100 years after his death. In it, Twain said:

There is one notable thing about our Christianity: bad, bloody, merciless, money-grabbing, and predatory as it is – in our country particularly and in all other Christian countries in a somewhat modified degree – it is still a hundred times better than the Christianity of the Bible, with its prodigious crime – the invention of Hell. Measured by our Christianity of to-day, bad as it is, hypocritical as it is, empty and hollow as it is, neither the Deity nor his Son is a Christian, nor qualified for that moderately high place. Ours is a terrible religion. The fleets of the world could swim in spacious comfort in the innocent blood it has spilled.

Twain was a Freemason. He belonged to Polar Star Lodge No. 79 A.F.&A.M., based in St. Louis. Twain was initiated an Entered Apprentice on May 22, 1861, passed to the degree of Fellow Craft on June 12, and raised to the degree of Master Mason on July 10.

Twain visited Salt Lake City for two days and met members of the Church of Jesus Christ of Latter-day Saints. They also gave him a Book of Mormon. He later wrote in Roughing It about that book:

The book seems to be merely a prosy detail of imaginary history, with the Old Testament for a model; followed by a tedious plagiarism of the New Testament.

== Pen names ==
Twain used different pen names before deciding on "Mark Twain". He signed humorous and imaginative sketches as "Josh" until 1863. Additionally, Twain used the pen name "Thomas Jefferson Snodgrass" for a series of humorous letters. Before that, he was also called “Sieur Louis de Conte” and "John Snook".

Twain maintained that his primary pen name came from his years working on Mississippi riverboats, where two fathoms, a depth indicating water safe for the passage of boat, was a measure on the sounding line. Twain is an archaic term for "two", as in "The veil of the temple was rent in twain." The riverboatman's cry was "mark twain" or, more fully, "by the mark twain", meaning "according to the mark [on the line], [the depth is] two [fathoms]"; that is, "The water is 12 feet (3.7 m) deep and it is safe to pass."

Twain said that his famous pen name was not entirely his invention. In Life on the Mississippi, Twain wrote:

Captain Isaiah Sellers was not of literary turn or capacity, but he used to jot down brief paragraphs of plain practical information about the river, and sign them "MARK TWAIN", and give them to the New Orleans Picayune. They related to the stage and condition of the river, and were accurate and valuable; ... At the time that the telegraph brought the news of his death, I was on the Pacific coast. I was a fresh new journalist, and needed a nom de guerre; so I confiscated the ancient mariner's discarded one, and have done my best to make it remain what it was in his hands – a sign and symbol and warrant that whatever is found in its company may be gambled on as being the petrified truth; how I have succeeded, it would not be modest in me to say.

Twain's story about his pen name has been questioned by some, with the suggestion that "mark twain" refers to a running bar tab that Twain would regularly incur while drinking at John Piper's saloon in Virginia City, Nevada. Samuel Clemens himself responded to this suggestion by saying, "Mark Twain was the nom de plume of one Captain Isaiah Sellers, who used to write river news over it for the New Orleans Picayune. He died in 1863 and as he could no longer need that signature, I laid violent hands upon it without asking permission of the proprietor's remains. That is the history of the nom de plume I bear."

In his autobiography, Twain writes further of Captain Sellers's use of "Mark Twain":

I was a cub pilot on the Mississippi River then, and one day I wrote a rude and crude satire which was leveled at Captain Isaiah Sellers, the oldest steamboat pilot on the Mississippi River, and the most respected, esteemed, and revered. For many years he had occasionally written brief paragraphs concerning the river and the changes which it had undergone under his observation during fifty years, and had signed these paragraphs "Mark Twain" and published them in the St. Louis and New Orleans journals. In my satire I made rude game of his reminiscences. It was a shabby poor performance, but I didn't know it, and the pilots didn't know it. The pilots thought it was brilliant. They were jealous of Sellers, because when the gray-heads among them pleased their vanity by detailing in the hearing of the younger craftsmen marvels which they had seen in the long ago on the river, Sellers was always likely to step in at the psychological moment and snuff them out with wonders of his own which made their small marvels look pale and sick. However, I have told all about this in "Old Times on the Mississippi." The pilots handed my extravagant satire to a river reporter, and it was published in the New Orleans True Delta. That poor old Captain Sellers was deeply wounded. He had never been held up to ridicule before; he was sensitive, and he never got over the hurt which I had wantonly and stupidly inflicted upon his dignity. I was proud of my performance for a while, and considered it quite wonderful, but I have changed my opinion of it long ago. Sellers never published another paragraph nor ever used his nom de guerre again.

== Legacy and depictions ==
While Twain is often depicted wearing a white suit, modern representations suggesting that he wore them throughout his life are unfounded. Evidence suggests that Twain began wearing white suits on the lecture circuit, after the death of his wife in 1904. However, there is also evidence showing Twain wearing a white suit before 1904. In 1882, he sent a photograph of himself in a white suit to 18-year-old Edward W. Bok, later publisher of the Ladies Home Journal, with a handwritten dated note. The white suit did eventually become Twain's trademark, as illustrated in anecdotes about this eccentricity (such as the time he wore a white summer suit to a Congressional hearing during the winter). McMasters' The Mark Twain Encyclopedia states that Twain did not wear a white suit in his last three years, except at one banquet speech.

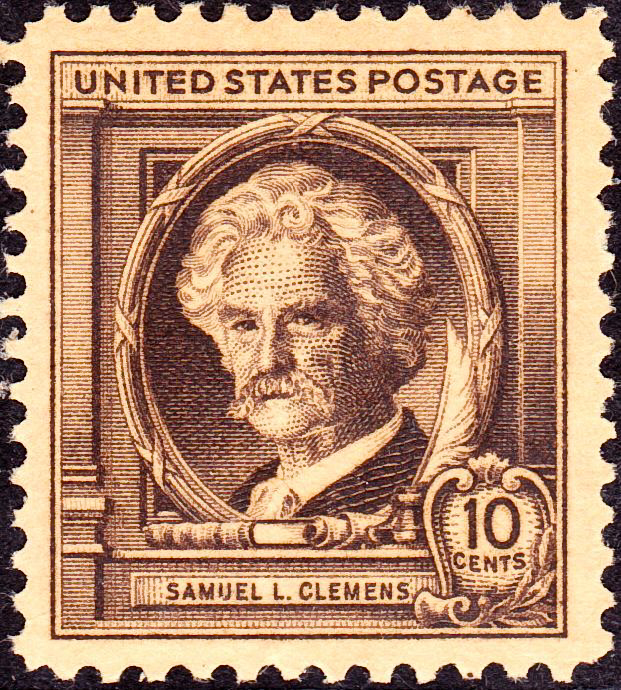
The U.S. post Office issued a commemorative stamp in 1940 honoring Mark Twain

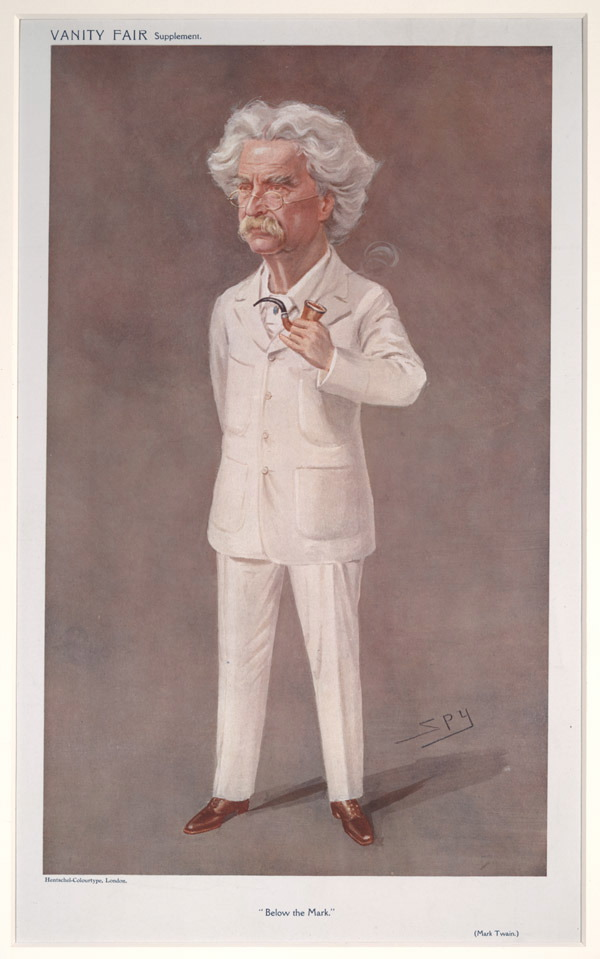
Caricature of Twain by Spy in the London magazine Vanity Fair, May 1908

In his autobiography, Twain writes of his early experiments with wearing white out-of-season:

Next after fine colors, I like plain white. One of my sorrows, when the summer ends, is that I must put off my cheery and comfortable white clothes and enter for the winter into the depressing captivity of the shapeless and degrading black ones. It is mid-October now, and the weather is growing cold up here in the New Hampshire hills, but it will not succeed in freezing me out of these white garments, for here the neighbors are few, and it is only of crowds that I am afraid.

== See also ==
- Mark Twain bibliography
- Mark Twain in popular culture
- National Tom Sawyer Days

== Sources ==
- Nathan G. Alexander, "Unclasping the Eagle's Talons: Mark Twain, American Freethought, and the Responses to Imperialism." Archived August 1, 2018, at the Wayback Machine The Journal of the Gilded Age and Progressive Era 17, no. 3 (2018): 524–545. doi:10.1017/S1537781418000099.
- Lucius Beebe. Comstock Commotion: The Story of the Territorial Enterprise and Virginia City News, Stanford University Press, 1954 ISBN 1-122-18798-X
- Louis J. Budd, ed. Mark Twain, Collected Tales, Sketches, Speeches & Essays 1891–1910 (Library of America, 1992) (ISBN 978-0-940450-73-8)
- Ken Burns, Dayton Duncan, and Geoffrey C. Ward, Mark Twain: An Illustrated Biography. New York: Alfred A. Knopf, 2001 (ISBN 0-375-40561-5)
- Philip S. Foner. Mark Twain: Social Critic. New York: International Publishers. 1966.
- Gregg Camfield. The Oxford Companion to Mark Twain. New York: Oxford University Press, 2002 (ISBN 0-19-510710-1)
- Guy Cardwell, ed. Mark Twain, Mississippi Writings, (Library of America, 1982) (ISBN 978-0-940450-07-3)
- Guy Cardwell, ed. Mark Twain, The Innocents Abroad & Roughing It, (Library of America, 1984) ISBN 978-0-940450-25-7
- Ron Chernow. Mark Twain, Penguin Press, 2025 (ISBN 978-0525561729)
- James M. Cox. Mark Twain: The Fate of Humor, Princeton University Press, 1966 (ISBN 0-8262-1428-2)
- Everett Emerson. Mark Twain: A Literary Life, Philadelphia: University of Pennsylvania Press, 2000 (ISBN 0-8122-3516-9)
- Shelley Fisher Fishkin Archived February 28, 2013, at the Wayback Machine, ed. A Historical Guide to Mark Twain. New York: Oxford University Press, 2002 (ISBN 0-19-513293-9)
- Shelley Fisher Fishkin, Lighting Out for the Territory: Reflections on Mark Twain and American Culture. New York: Oxford University Press, 1996 (ISBN 0-19-510531-1)
- Benjamin Griffin, ed., Mark Twain's Civil War: "The Private History of a Campaign That Failed". Berkeley, California: Heyday, 2019 (ISBN 9781597144780)
- Susan K. Harris, ed. Mark Twain, Historical Romances (Library of America, 1994) (ISBN 9780-940450-82-0)
- Hamlin L. Hill, ed. Mark Twain, The Gilded Age and Later Novels (Library of America, 2002) ISBN 978-1-931082-10-5
- Jason Gary Horn. Mark Twain: A Descriptive Guide to Biographical Sources, Lanham, MD: Scarecrow Press, 1999 (ISBN 0-8108-3630-0)
- William Dean Howells. My Mark Twain, Mineloa, NY: Dover Publications, 1997 [1910] (ISBN 0-486-29640-7)
- Fred Kaplan. The Singular Mark Twain: A Biography, New York: Doubleday, 2003 (ISBN 0-385-47715-5)
- Justin Kaplan. Mr. Clemens and Mark Twain: A Biography, New York: Simon and Schuster, 1966 (ISBN 0-671-74807-6)
- J. R. LeMaster and James D. Wilson, eds. The Mark Twain Encyclopedia, New York: Garland, 1993 (ISBN 0-8240-7212-X)
- Andrew Levy, Huck Finn's America: Mark Twain and the Era that Shaped His Masterpiece. New York: Simon and Schuster, 2015.
- Jerome Loving, Mark Twain: The Adventures of Samuel L. Clemens. Berkeley: University of California Press, 2010. (ISBN 978-0-520-26985-9)
- Bruce Michelson, Mark Twain on the Loose, Amherst: University of Massachusetts Press, 1995 (ISBN 0-87023-967-8)
- Patrick Ober, Mark Twain and Medicine: "Any Mummery Will Cure" Columbia: University of Missouri Press, 2003 (ISBN 0-8262-1502-5)
- George Orwell, "Mark Twain – The Licensed Jester," The Collected Essays, Journalism and Letters of George Orwell, vol. 2: My Country Right or Left, 1940–1943, Harcourt Brace Jovanovich, 1968. Archived February 21, 2022, at the Wayback Machine
- Albert Bigelow Paine, Mark Twain, A Biography: The Personal and Literary Life of Samuel Langhorne Clemens, Harper & Bros., 1912. ISBN 1-84702-983-3
- Mark Perry, Grant and Twain: The Story of a Friendship that Changed American; also published as Grant and Twain: The Story of an American Friendship, New York: Random House, 2004. ISBN 0679642730
- Ron Powers, Dangerous Water: A Biography of the Boy Who Became Mark Twain, New York: Da Capo Press, 1999. ISBN 0-306-81086-7
- Ron Powers. Mark Twain: A Life, New York: Random House, 2005. (ISBN 0-7432-4899-6)
- Radavich, David (2004). "Twain, Howells, and the Origins of Midwestern Drama". MidAmerica. XXXI: 25–42.
- R. Kent Rasmussen, Critical Companion to Mark Twain: A Literary Reference to His Life and Work, Facts On File, 2007. Revised edition of Mark Twain A to Z ISBN 0-8160-6225-0
- R. Kent Rasmussen, ed., The Quotable Mark Twain: His Essential Aphorisms, Witticisms and Concise Opinions, Contemporary Books, 1997 ISBN 0-8092-2987-0
- Gary Scharnhorst, ed., Mark Twain: The Complete Interviews, Tuscaloosa: University of Alabama Press, 2006. ISBN 9780817315221
  - Gary Scharnhorst, ed., Mainly the Truth: Interviews with Mark Twain, Tuscaloosa: University of Alabama Press, 2009. ISBN 9780817355395
  - Gary Scharnhorst, ed., Twain in His Own Time: A Biographical Chronicle of His Life, Drawn from Recollections, Interviews, and Memoirs by Family, Friends, and Associates, Iowa City: University of Iowa Press, 2010. ISBN 9781587299148
  - Gary Scharnhorst, ed., Mark Twain on Potholes and Politics: Letters to the Editor, Columbia, Missouri: University of Missouri Press, 2014. ISBN 9780826220462
- Gary Scharnhorst, The Life of Mark Twain: The Early Years, 1835–1871, Columbia, Missouri: University of Missouri Press, 2018. ISBN 9780826221445
  - Gary Scharnhorst, The Life of Mark Twain: The Middle Years, 1871–1891, Columbia, Missouri: University of Missouri Press, 2019. ISBN 9780826274304
  - Gary Scharnhorst, The Life of Mark Twain: The Final Years, 1891–1910, Columbia, Missouri: University of Missouri Press, 2022. ISBN 9780826222411
- Paul A. Shackel, "America's home town: fiction, Mark Twain, and the re‐creation of Hannibal, Missouri." International Journal of Heritage Studies 17.3 (2011): 197–213. online Archived January 16, 2023, at the Wayback Machine
- Ben Tarnoff, The Bohemians: Mark Twain and the San Francisco Writers Who Reinvented American Literature. New York: The Penguin Press, 2014
- Mark Twain (November 1874). "A True Story, Repeated Word for Word As I Heard It". The Atlantic Monthly. Boston: Atlantic Monthly Co. pp. 591–594. Archived from the original on February 20, 2009.
- Larzer Ziff, Mark Twain, New York: Oxford University Press, 2004. ISBN 0195170199
- Anonymous (1873). "Mark Twain". Cartoon portraits and biographical sketches of men of the day. Illustrated by Frederick Waddy. London: Tinsley Brothers. p. 122. Archived from the original on May 11, 2011.
- Articles about Mark Twain in Western American Literature Journal, Western Literature Association
