= Orion Clemens =

American politician (1825–1897)

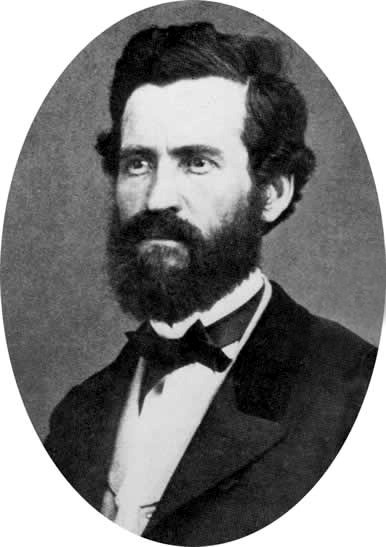

Secretary of Nevada Territory
- In office 1861–1864
- Nominated by: Abraham Lincoln

Personal details
- Born: July 17, 1825 Gainesboro, Tennessee, United States
- Died: December 11, 1897 (aged 72) Keokuk, Iowa, United States
- Resting place: Mount Olivet Cemetery Hannibal, Missouri, United States
- Party: Republican
- Spouse: Mary Eleanor Stotts
- Children: 1
- Parent(s): John Marshall Clemens (father); Jane Lampton Clemens (mother)
- Relatives: Mark Twain (brother)
- Profession: Journalist
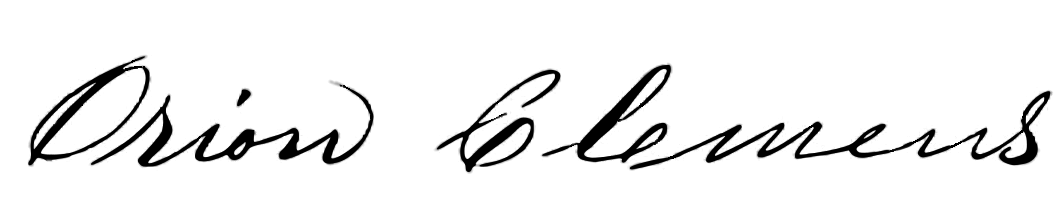
- Signature

Orion Clemens (July 17, 1825 – December 11, 1897) was an American politician who was the first and only Secretary of the Nevada Territory. As a member of the Republican Party, he supported Abraham Lincoln, thinking slavery was morally wrong. His younger brother Samuel Langhorne Clemens became an author under the pen name Mark Twain.

Clemens was born in Gainesboro, Tennessee, the eldest child of the family. He married Mary Stotts and had one child, Jennie. She died in 1864, negatively affecting Clemens and his political career. Soon after, he became a state assemblyman, though he had low pay, so he quit and left Nevada in 1866. Clemens died December 11, 1897 in Keokuk, Iowa.

== Early life ==
Born in Gainesboro, Tennessee, Orion Clemens was the eldest of seven children. Four of his six siblings died before reaching the age of twenty, leaving only sister Pamela (1827–1904) and his brother Samuel (1835–1910). In 1839, the Clemens family moved to Hannibal, Missouri, a port town on the Mississippi River which was to eventually inspire some of his brother Sam's stories.

As a young man, Clemens worked in his father's general store, and later as an apprentice at a local newspaper, before moving to St. Louis, Missouri. In St. Louis, Clemens began studying law under attorney Edward Bates, who later served as Attorney General for President Abraham Lincoln. After his father's death in 1847, Clemens returned to Hannibal and purchased the local newspaper, then became the owner of The Hannibal Journal where Samuel worked for him. Unable to make a successful living as a journalist there, Clemens relocated to Muscatine, Iowa, in 1853 to run the Muscatine Journal.

Just a year later he was in Keokuk, Iowa, with new wife Mary Eleanor "Mollie" Stotts, running the "Ben Franklin Book and job printing office". In 1855, he hired his brother Sam at $5 a week to join him there. Sam stayed for a year and a half before growing restless and moving on.

== Political career ==
By at least 1860 Clemens had come to the conclusion that slavery was morally wrong, and had worked for the election of Republican Abraham Lincoln. Following Lincoln's election as president that year, Clemens was appointed Secretary to the new government of the Territory of Nevada at a salary of $1,800 a year. His younger brother Sam accompanied him to Nevada Territory in the summer of 1861. Sam would later write about this journey in his semi-autobiographical book, Roughing It. Sam drifted into mining and newspaper work, while his brother served as Territorial Secretary and often as acting governor when James W. Nye was outside the territory. It was while acting as temporary governor that Orion gained political popularity by avoiding a "Sagebrush War" with California over disputed state boundary lines. He built a home in Carson City and brought his wife, Mollie, and young daughter, Jennie, to Nevada a year after his arrival. Jennie died there in February 1864. Clemens offered strong support of the newly formed government in Carson City, paying out of his own pocket for the printing of the House and Senate Journals and to furnish the two territorial legislative chambers.

After the Territory became the thirty-sixth state of the US on October 31, 1864, Clemens tried to secure the nomination for Nevada Secretary of State. Clemens, "a confirmed teetotaler since his days as a printer's apprentice in St. Louis", took a strong position against the availability of whiskey, which lost him much support. The death of his only child also permanently dampened the spirits of the often moody Orion, making effective campaigning difficult.

The following year, he served a brief time as an elected state assemblyman. However, the meager salary of a legislator and his inability to develop a successful law practice led him to leave Nevada in August 1866, forced to sell their home for a financial loss.

== Later life ==
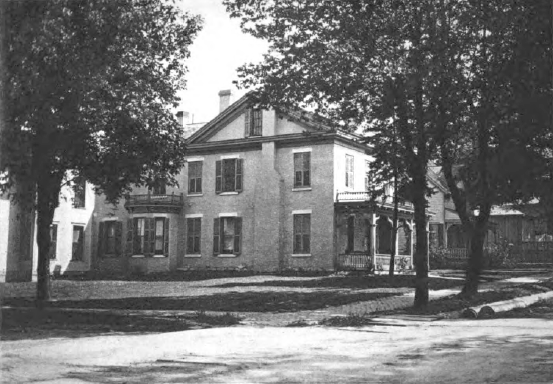
Clemens' residence in Keokuk, Iowa

After leaving Nevada, Clemens and Mollie tried unsuccessfully to start a new life in Meadow Lake, California. They then lived for some time in the eastern United States, where Clemens again attempted to pursue a career in journalism, before finally relocating once again to Keokuk, Iowa, in the mid-1870s, where he lived for the remainder of his life. There he at times practiced law, raised chickens, and worked at inventing various gadgets. Unfortunately, his endeavors were largely unsuccessful, and his main source of income was his brother Sam, who visited often after their mother moved to join Clemens and Mollie.

Orion spent much of his time in Keokuk working on his autobiography, which Sam encouraged him to write as an example of the failure of the American dream. Orion Clemens died December 11, 1897. There are reports that Sam burned portions of his brother's manuscript that he found unsuitable. The work is lost and has never been published.

== Personal life ==
Clemens wed Mary Eleanor "Mollie" Stotts in 1854. Their only child, a daughter, Jennie, was born in 1855. She was beloved by her uncle Samuel. When the family moved to Nevada, Jennie attended Sierra Seminary in Carson City about which Sam wrote a piece after visiting her there. Jennie fell ill to spotted fever on January 29, 1864, and died of meningitis, a complication of the illness, on February 1, 1864. Her parents and uncle had stood vigil around her bedside until she died.

== Legacy ==
The Orion Clemens House, in Carson City, is listed on the National Register of Historic Places.

Political offices
Preceded by Position created	Secretary of Nevada Territory; 1861–1864	Succeeded by Chauncey N. Noteware (as Secretary of State)
