= Edgewater, Volusia County, Florida =

Edgewater, Florida
- City
- City of Edgewater
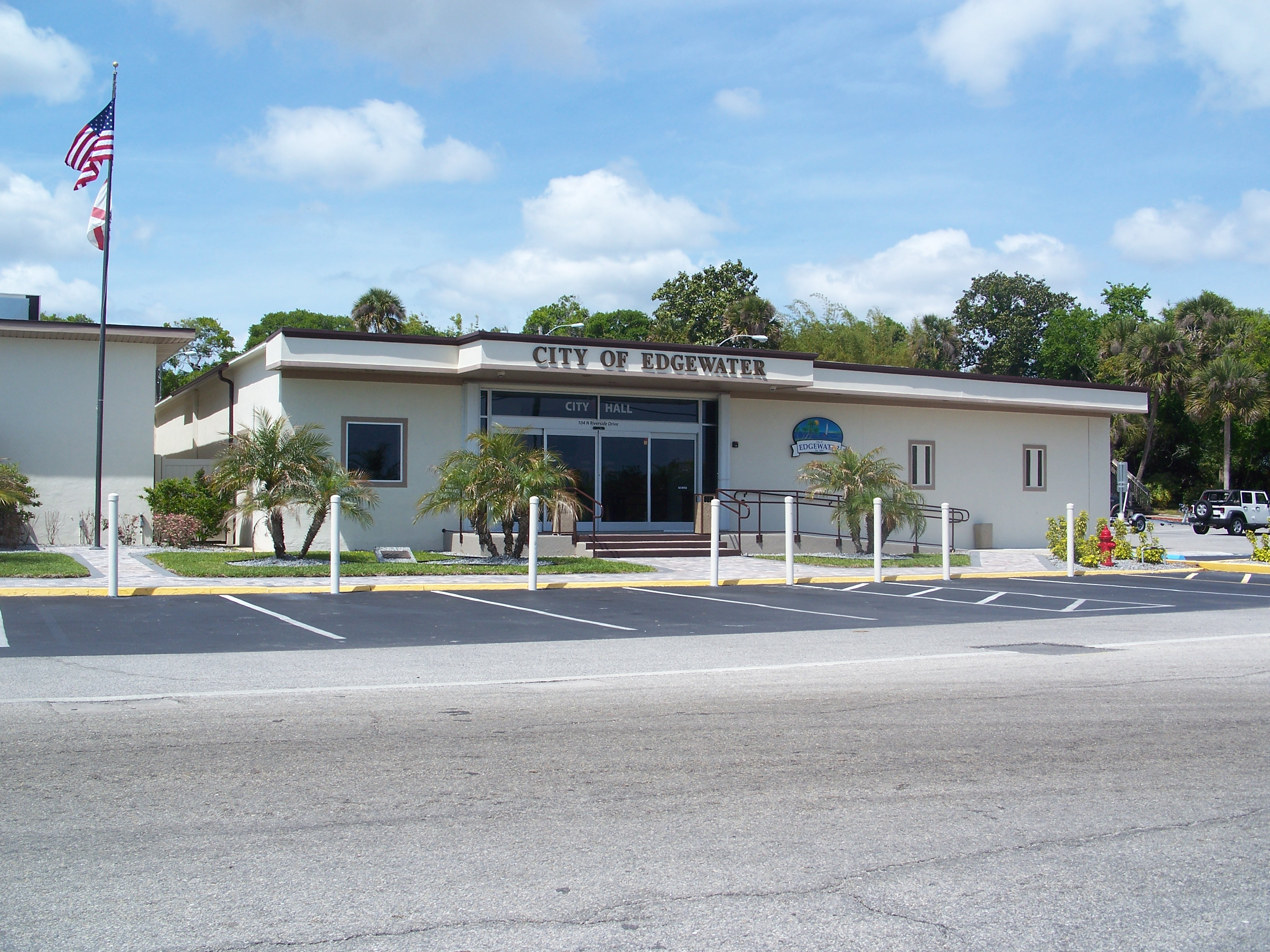
- Edgewater City Hall as seen in 2010

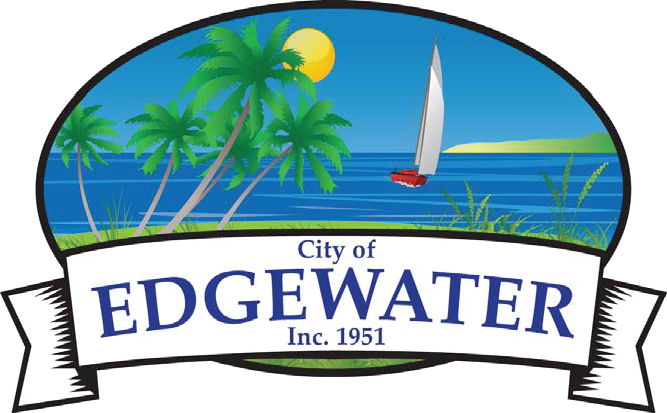
- Nickname: "The Hospitality City"
- Location in Volusia County and the state of Florida
- Coordinates: 28°57′50″N 80°54′17″W
- Country: United States
- State: Florida
- County: Volusia
- Incorporated (Town of Hawks Park): 1915
- Incorporated (City of Edgewater): 1924
- Founder: John Milton Hawks

Government
  - Type: Council–Manager

Area
  - Total: 25.10 sq mi (65.02 km^{2})
  - Land: 24.71 sq mi (64.00 km^{2})
  - Water: 0.39 sq mi (1.02 km^{2})
- Elevation: 26 ft (7.9 m)

Population (2020)
  - Total: 23,097
  - Density: 934.8/sq mi (360.91/km^{2})
- Time zone: UTC-5 (EST)
  - Summer (DST): UTC-4 (EDT)
- ZIP codes: 32132, 32141
- Area code: 386
- FIPS code: 12-19825
- GNIS feature ID: 2403541
- Website: www.cityofedgewater.org

Edgewater is a city in Volusia County, Florida, United States, situated along the Indian River North, adjacent to the Mosquito Lagoon. It is a part of the Deltona–Daytona Beach–Ormond Beach, FL metropolitan statistical area. As of the 2020 US census, the city had a population of 23,097.

A settlement in the area was established by John Milton Hawks. It was incorporated in 1915 as the Town of Hawks Park, and kept the name Hawks Park until 1924, when the Florida Legislature renamed it as the City of Edgewater.

== Geography ==
According to the United States Census Bureau, the city has a total area of 22.6 square miles (58.5 km^{2}), with 22.2 square miles (57.5 km^{2}) (98.25%) of land, and 0.39 square miles (1.0 km^{2}) (1.65%) of water. It runs parallel to the Indian River and is largely influenced by the water, which generates tourism, the main contributor to the city's economy.

== Demographics ==
Historical population
Census	Pop.	Note	%±
1920	133		—
1930	341		156.4%
1940	477		39.9%
1950	837		75.5%
1960	2,051		145.0%
1970	3,348		63.2%
1980	6,726		100.9%
1990	15,337		128.0%
2000	18,668		21.7%
2010	20,750		11.2%
2020	23,097		11.3%
U.S. Decennial Census

Edgewater racial composition (Hispanics excluded from racial categories) (NH = Non-Hispanic)
Race	Pop 2010	Pop 2020	% 2010	% 2020
White (NH)	18,972	20,233	91.43%	87.60%
Black or African American (NH)	522	639	2.52%	2.77%
Native American or Alaska Native (NH)	53	72	0.26%	0.31%
Asian (NH)	182	172	0.88%	0.74%
Pacific Islander or Native Hawaiian (NH)	1	8	0.00%	0.03%
Some other race (NH)	24	67	0.12%	0.29%
Two or more races/multiracial (NH)	283	887	1.36%	3.84%
Hispanic or Latino (any race)	713	1,019	3.44%	4.41%
Total	20,750	23,097		

As of the 2020 United States census, 23,097 people, 10,927 households, and 6,374 families were residing in the city.

As of the 2010 United States census, there were 20,750 people, 8,605 households, and 5,612 families residing in the city.

In 2010, the population density was 934.0 inhabitants per square mile (360.6/km^{2}). There were 9,929 total housing units at an average density of 447 per square mile (173/km^{2}).

In 2010, there were 8,786 households, out of which 22.3% had children under the age of 18 living with them, 49.0% were married couples living together, 12.1% had a female householder with no husband present, and 33.4% were non-families. 26.0% of all households were made up of individuals, and 13.6% had someone living alone who was 65 years of age or older. The average household size was 2.36 and the average family size was 2.79.

In 2010 in the city, the age distribution was 19.2% under 18, 4.7% from 20 to 24, 21.6% from 25 to 44, 30.0% from 45 to 64, and 22.1% who were 65 or older. The median age was 46.7 years. For every 100 females, there were 92.2 males. For every 100 females 18 and over, there were 89.6 males.

In 2010, the median income for a household in the city was $47,750, and for a family was $35,852. Males had a median income of $27,453 versus $21,999 for females. The per capita income for the city was $17,017. About 6.4% of families and 9.2% of the population were below the poverty line, including 16.0% of those under age 18 and 4.9% of those age 65 or over.

== Economy ==
Local businesses include those in the construction, boat, garment, and honey industries. Recent studies show a workforce with 10% underemployed. The city is within an hour's drive of seven colleges and universities and an advanced technology center. The education, healthcare, and government sectors are the area's largest employers.

== Notable people ==
- Adam Lovell, founder and owner of WriteAPrisoner.com
- Cindy Lovell, educator and writer
- Peter Wolf Toth, sculptor
- Tilly van der Zwaard, Dutch athlete
