= Neal Moore =

American writer and canoeist (born 1971)

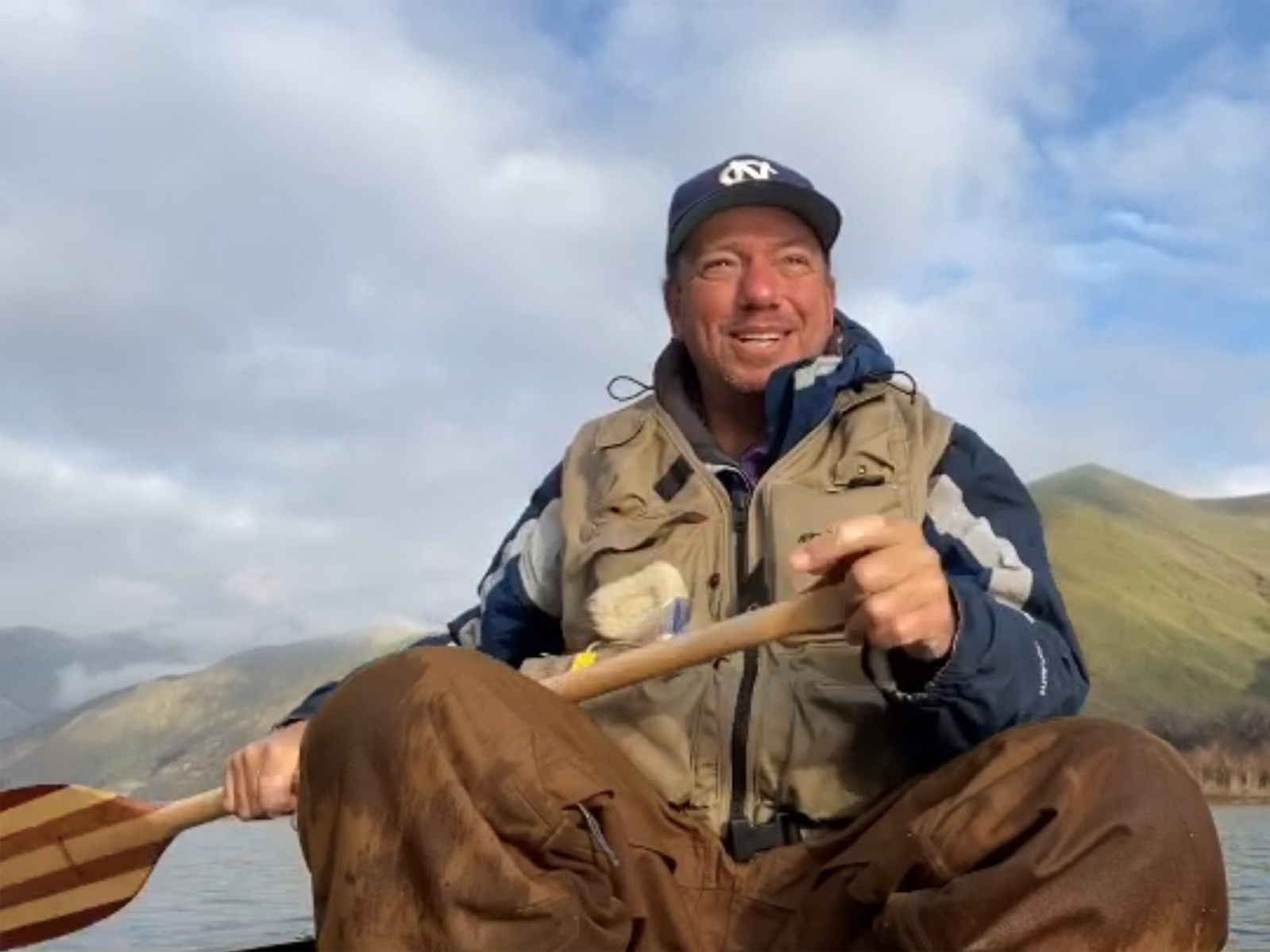
- Moore on the Snake River in April 2020
- Born: November 22, 1971 (age 54); Los Angeles, California, U.S.
- Education: University of Utah (BA)
- Occupations: Writer, canoeist
- Writing career
- Period: 2012–present
- Subject: Creative nonfiction

Neal Moore (born November 22, 1971) is an American writer and canoeist. He is the author of two non-fiction books—Down the Mississippi and Homelands: A Memoir—as well as numerous news articles. The Mark Twain Museum, CNN and The Times of London have dubbed him "the modern-day Huckleberry Finn.”

Moore is the first person known to paddle a canoe solo and continuously across the United States from the West Coast to the East Coast. His journey linked 22 rivers and waterways in 22 states over 22 months, from Astoria, Oregon, to New York City, with a circuit of the Statue of Liberty as the grand finale.

== Early life and education ==
Moore was born and raised in Los Angeles, California, where he attended Highland Hall Waldorf School and was neighbors with the actor and comedian Richard Pryor. He lost his mother and his only sibling, an older brother, while still a teenager. By 19, he moved to South Africa to serve a mission for the Church of Jesus Christ of Latter-day Saints, an experience he later wrote about as a non-practicing Mormon, published by Der Spiegel and expanded into a memoir, Homelands.

Moore attended the University of Utah in Salt Lake City, Utah, where he graduated in 1997 with a degree in English Literature. Moore has lived most of the last three decades between Cape Town and Taipei, which he has used as springboards for other adventures. He has sporadically returned to his native United States as a journalist and long-haul canoeist.

== Career ==
=== Canoeing ===
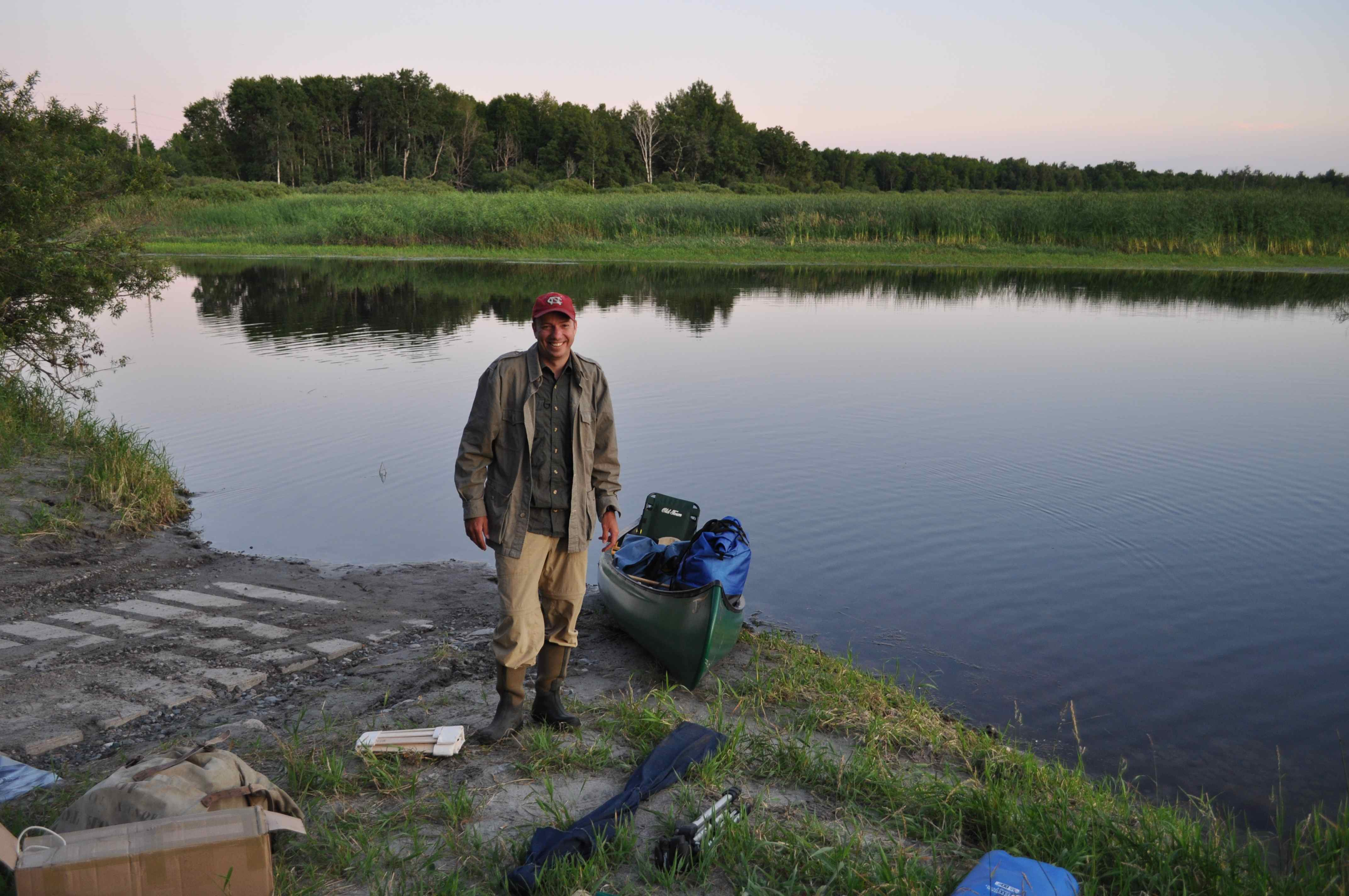
Moore on the Mississippi River in 2009

Moore's interest in canoeing was sparked by Eddy L. Harris’s memoir of his descent of the Mississippi River, titled Mississippi Solo. In 2009, Moore canoed the length of the Mississippi while reporting as a citizen journalist for CNN on the human face of the Great Recession. The expedition was featured by CNN.com Specials. It was on this journey that Moore met and befriended fellow canoeist Dick Conant – the subject of The New Yorker writer Ben McGrath’s book Riverman: An American Odyssey – who encouraged Moore to “string rivers together” to make a grand adventure.

Following the 2014 disappearance and presumed death of Dick Conant on a canoe expedition along the Intracoastal Waterway of coastal North Carolina, in 2018, Moore attempted to paddle a canoe from the West Coast to the East Coast but was hampered by flooding on the Columbia River, the Spokane River and the Clark Fork River, along with a near-fatal tip-in on the St. Regis River in Western Montana. After paddling and portaging 1,800 miles from the Pacific Coast, Moore hung up his paddles in North Dakota. He would re-attempt his coast-to-coast odyssey a year and a half later, back from the start in Astoria, Oregon in February, 2020.

For 675 days, from February 9, 2020, until December 14, 2021, Moore successfully crossed the United States in his canoe from Astoria, Oregon to New York City. His trip took place in the midst of the COVID-19 pandemic and the year leading into and following the contentious 2020 United States presidential election as he explored the threads that tie Americans together – even during a time of extreme polarization by race, class and political ideology. His solo, continuous 7,500-mile journey, considered a first from west to east, was covered by media around the world and recognized with one of Topps most distinctive badges—a Topps Allen & Ginter baseball card.

=== Journalism ===
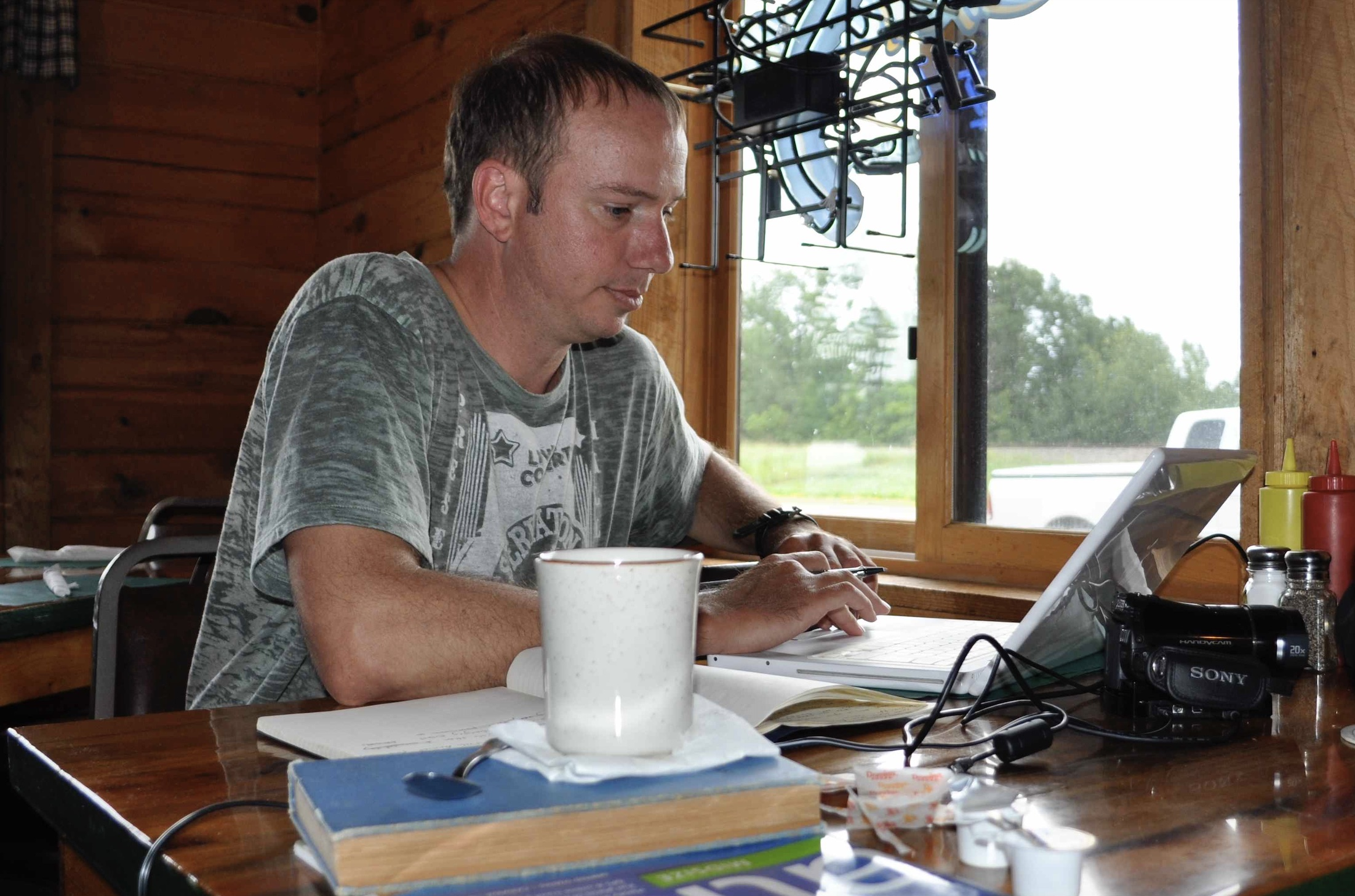
Moore filing a dispatch along the Mississippi River in 2009

Much of Moore's popularity as a writer came from his work as a citizen journalist for CNN. Between July and December 2009, he canoed the length of the Mississippi River, sourcing, capturing and uploading 50 roving stories on the Great Recession. In addition to his work on canoeing, the topics he covered as a freelance writer varied greatly; his work has also appeared in The New Yorker, Der Spiegel, and on CNN International.

In Taiwan, Moore explored trilateral relations between the United States, the People's Republic of China, and the Republic of China by reporting on the 30th anniversary of the Taiwan Relations Act, interviewing American writer and diplomat Syd Goldsmith, Taiwan Foreign Minister Joseph Wu of the Democratic Progressive Party and Taichung mayor Jason Hu of the Kuomintang. He covered the Mainland Chinese dissident beat, interviewing Wu’er Kaixi in 2011 on the cusp of the Jasmine Revolution, along with Chinese cyber-dissidents Cai Lujun and Li JiaBao. For the 25th anniversary of the Tiananmen Square crackdown in Beijing, Moore spoke with Wang Dan (dissident), the protest's most visible student leader. On China's future, Wang told Moore, “There will be only two choices: Democracy, or die.”

=== Books ===
==== Down the Mississippi ====
Down the Mississippi (2012) is a non-fiction account of a solo canoe voyage from the Mississippi's headwaters at Lake Itasca in Minnesota to New Orleans in 2009. This work combined aspects of journalism, travel writing, autobiography and memoir, and personal reflection, and, as with Moore's subsequent work, focused specifically on questions of identity in relation to race, class and political stripe. It was co-authored by Mark Twain scholar Cindy Lovell.

==== Homelands: A Memoir ====
In 2017, Moore expanded his August 2013 Der Spiegel article into Homelands: A Memoir. The book describes his time as a naïve, 19-year-old drug-addled sixth-generation Mormon missionary in South Africa as the Group Areas Act of Apartheid was beginning to unravel. The coming-of-age story is set against the backdrop of the Bantustans of the tribal Ciskei and Transkei between the volatile years of Nelson Mandela’s release from prison and ascension to power.
