= National Tom Sawyer Days =

Annual outdoor festival in Hannibal, Missouri

- Status: Active
- Genre: Festival or Fair
- Date: 1956
- Frequency: Annually
- Venue: Broadway street
- Locations: Hannibal, Missouri
- Coordinates: 39.705°N 91.366944°W
- Country: US
- Years active: 70
- Founders: Hannibal Jaycees
- Most recent: July 4, 2026
- Next event: July 4, 2027
- Major events: Games
- Website: Tom Sawyer Days

National Tom Sawyer Days, also known as the National Tom Sawyer Days Carnival, takes place in Hannibal, Missouri every year over the July 4 weekend. The festival includes contests from Mark Twain novels along with a parade, fireworks and a 10 km (6.2 mi) run.

== History ==
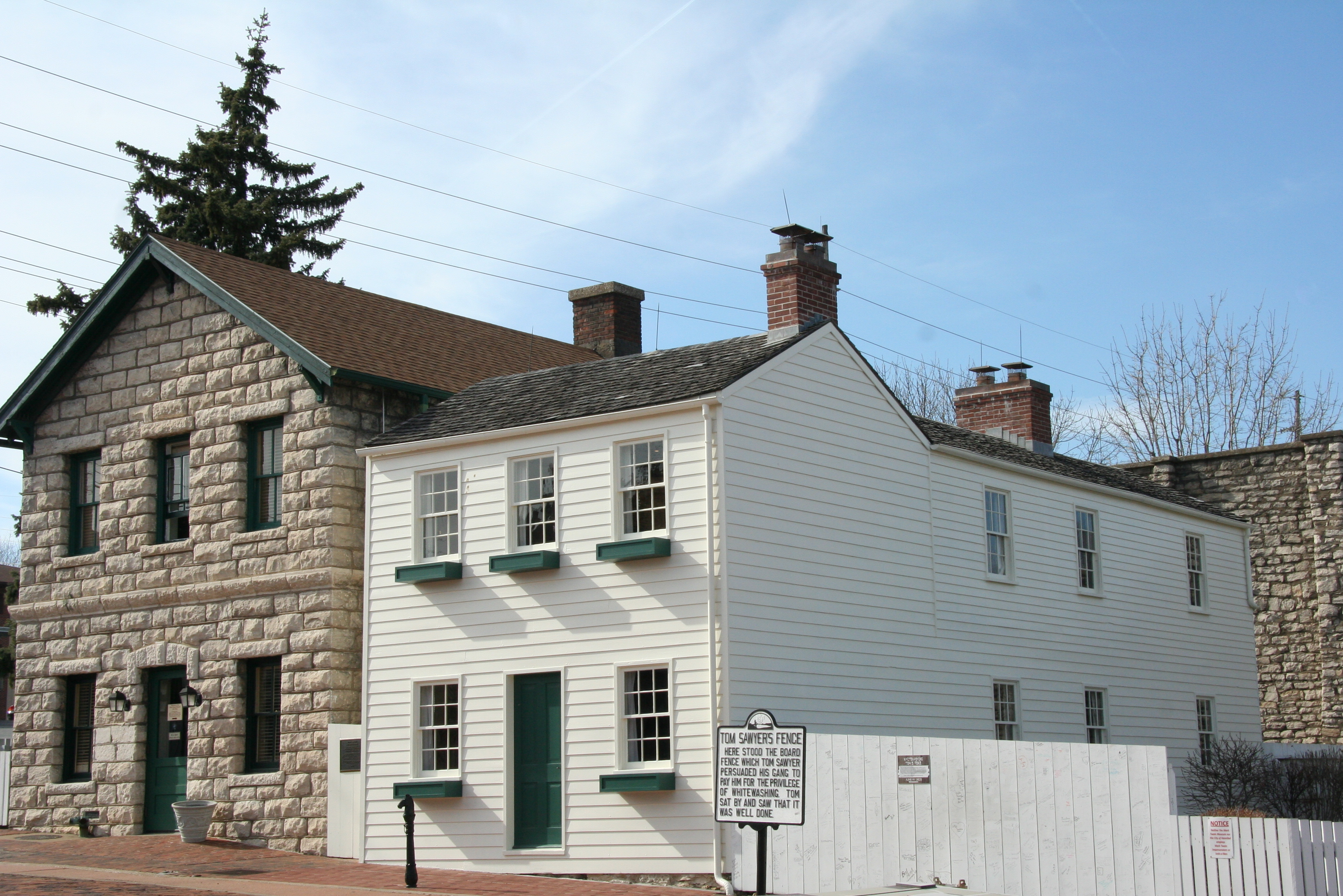
The Mark Twain Boyhood Home & Museum is one of the attractions at the festival

National Tom Sawyer Days is organized by the Hannibal Jaycees in Hannibal, Missouri; it began in 1956. The event is held on the banks of the Mississippi River in downtown Hannibal. Mark Twain was raised in Hannibal, Missouri, which provided the setting for his novels about Tom Sawyer and Huckleberry Finn. In 1959, a joint proclamation by the mayor, as well as the governors of Illinois and Missouri, moved the holiday to July 4.

=== Events ===
Events at the fair include frog jumping, fence painting, and a "Tom and Becky" look alike contest. Other events include a 10 km (6.2 mi) run, a Fourth of July parade, fireworks, and a tricycling race on East Broadway Street, running along the river.

In 1993, competitors participated in a mud volleyball tournament while the Mississippi River was 12 feet over flood level. There was also a Mark Twain impersonator, wearing all white, leading a parade down Broadway.

== See also ==
- Mark Twain Boyhood Home & Museum
- Mark Twain Cave
