= Carl Jackson =

American musician

- Born: September 18, 1953 (age 73)
- Origin: Louisville, Mississippi, United States
- Genres: Bluegrass; Country
- Occupations: Singer-songwriter, musician, producer
- Instruments: Banjo; guitar; mandolin; vocals
- Years active: 1968–present
- Labels: Capitol; Sugar Hill; Columbia; Universal South Records; Rounder Records; Vanguard; Shell Point Records; Mailboat Records; Sony Legacy Recordings Prize Records
- Website: http://www.carljackson.net

Carl Eugene Jackson (born September 18, 1953) is an American country and bluegrass musician. Jackson's first Grammy Award was awarded in 1992 for his duet album with John Starling titled Spring Training. In 2003, Jackson produced the Grammy Award-winning CD titled Livin', Lovin', Losin': Songs of the Louvin Brothers – a tribute to Ira and Charlie Louvin. He also recorded one of the songs on the CD, a collection of duets featuring such artists as James Taylor, Alison Krauss, Dolly Parton, Johnny Cash, Emmylou Harris, and others.

== Biography ==
Jackson's musical career began in childhood. At the age of 14, he was invited to play banjo for Jim and Jesse and the Virginia Boys, one of the most respected bluegrass bands at that time. After five years with Jim and Jesse, Jackson tested the musical waters elsewhere before landing a job with Glen Campbell. Jackson remained in Campbell's band for 12 years.

Jackson continued to work in Nashville as a songwriter and musician. Between 1984 and 1985, he charted three singles on the Billboard country music charts, including the number 44 hit "She's Gone, Gone, Gone". Jackson was also named bluegrass music's MVP in 2006. He also earned the International Bluegrass Music Association's Song of the Year award in 1990 for "Little Mountain Church House", which was recorded by Ricky Skaggs and the Nitty Gritty Dirt Band.

Jackson has written songs performed by Glen Campbell ("Letter To Home"), Garth Brooks ("Against the Grain", "Fit for a King"), Alecia Nugent ("Breaking New Ground"), Terri Clark ("Hold Your Horses"), and Rhonda Vincent ("I'm Not Over You"), among others.

Jackson's "Lonesome Dove" was recorded by co-writer Larry Cordle and Lonesome Standard Time, Ricky Skaggs, Trisha Yearwood, and Tim Hensley, in addition to his own rendition on the album with John Starling, Spring Training, which featured Emmylou Harris and her Nash Ramblers band. The CD was released in 1991. Jackson received a Grammy Award that year for Spring Training. In 2003, he was awarded another Grammy for producing the album Livin', Lovin', Losin': Songs of the Louvin Brothers.

In 2010–11, Jackson produced Mark Twain: Words and Music as a benefit for the Mark Twain Boyhood Home and Museum in Hannibal, Missouri. The double album was a collaboration with his childhood friend, Cindy Lovell, and tells Twain's life in spoken word and song. It features Jimmy Buffett as Huckleberry Finn, Garrison Keillor as narrator, Clint Eastwood as Twain, and Angela Lovell as Susie Clemens. Singers include Brad Paisley, Emmylou Harris, Vince Gill, Rhonda Vincent, Ricky Skaggs, Sheryl Crow, and more. Also in 2011, Jackson was honored by the Mississippi Humanities Council for his musical legacy. Jackson was further honored by his home state of Mississippi with the installation of a Country Music Trail Marker located at 143 South Church in his hometown of Louisville.

On May 12, 2015 Sony's Legacy Recordings released Orthophonic Joy: The 1927 Bristol Sessions Revisited, which Jackson produced as a benefit for the Birthplace of Country Music Museum in Bristol, Tennessee. Rusty Morrell was the executive producer. Like Mark Twain: Words and Music, the project is a double-CD using spoken word and song to tell a larger story. Orthophonic Joy combines updated versions of songs recorded at the original 1927 Bristol Sessions, also known as the "big bang" of country music, with story tracks that provide context. The artists, in addition to Jackson, included Doyle Lawson and Quicksilver, Emmylou Harris, Marty Stuart, Dolly Parton, Ashley Monroe, The Shotgun Rubies, Steve Martin and the Steep Canyon Rangers, Vince Gill, Keb' Mo', The Church Sisters, Corbin Hayslett, Brad Paisley, Ashley Campbell, Shannon Campbell, Sheryl Crow, Larry Cordle and the Virginia Luthiers, Jesse McReynolds, the Chuck Wagon Gang, and the Orthophonic Choir, which consists of the collective voices of everyone involved in the project. WSM disc jockey Eddie Stubbs narrated the spoken-word tracks, which were written by Cindy Lovell.

Jackson performed a duet of "Gentle on My Mind" with Ashley Campbell, daughter of Glen Campbell and Kimberly Woolen, on June 26, 2017. The two collaborated on Glen Campbell's last album, Adios.

== Discography ==
=== Albums ===
- Gospel Special 'with the Page Family'
- Bluegrass Festival (1971, Prize)
- Carl Jackson: Banjo Player (1973, Capitol)
- Old Friends (1978, Capitol)
- Banjo Man: A Tribute to Earl Scruggs (1981, Sugarhill)
- Mississippi Homecoming (1981)
- Song of the South (1982, Sugarhill)
- Banjo Hits (1983, Sugarhill) with Jim & Jesse
- Spring Training (1991, Sugarhill) with John Starling and the Nash Ramblers
- 'Neath the Oaks in the Grove (1993)
- Songs of the South (2001, Sugarhill) (compilation)
- Orthophonic Joy: The 1927 Bristol Sessions Revisited (2015, Sony Legacy Recordings)

=== Singles ===
Year	Single	US Country
1984	"She's Gone, Gone, Gone"	44
1985	"All That's Left for Me"	70
1985	"Dixie Train"	45
1986	"You Are the Rock (And I'm a Rolling Stone)"	85

== Awards ==
=== Grammy Awards ===
- 1991 Best Bluegrass Album for Spring Training, Carl Jackson and John Starling (with the Nash Ramblers)
- 2003 Best Country Album for Livin', Lovin', Losin': Songs of the Louvin Brothers, Carl Jackson, producer, Luke Wooten, engineer.

=== International Bluegrass Music Association Awards ===
- 1990 Song of the Year: for "Little Mountain Church", Doyle Lawson and Quicksilver (artists), Jim Rushing and Carl Jackson (songwriters)
- 2004 Album of The Year: Celebration of Life: Musicians Against Childhood Cancer, various artists including Carl Jackson
- 2004 Event of The Year: Livin', Lovin', Losin': Songs of the Louvin Brothers, produced by Carl Jackson
