= Mark Twain Historic District =

Historic district in Missouri, United States

- U.S. National Register of Historic Places
- U.S. Historic district
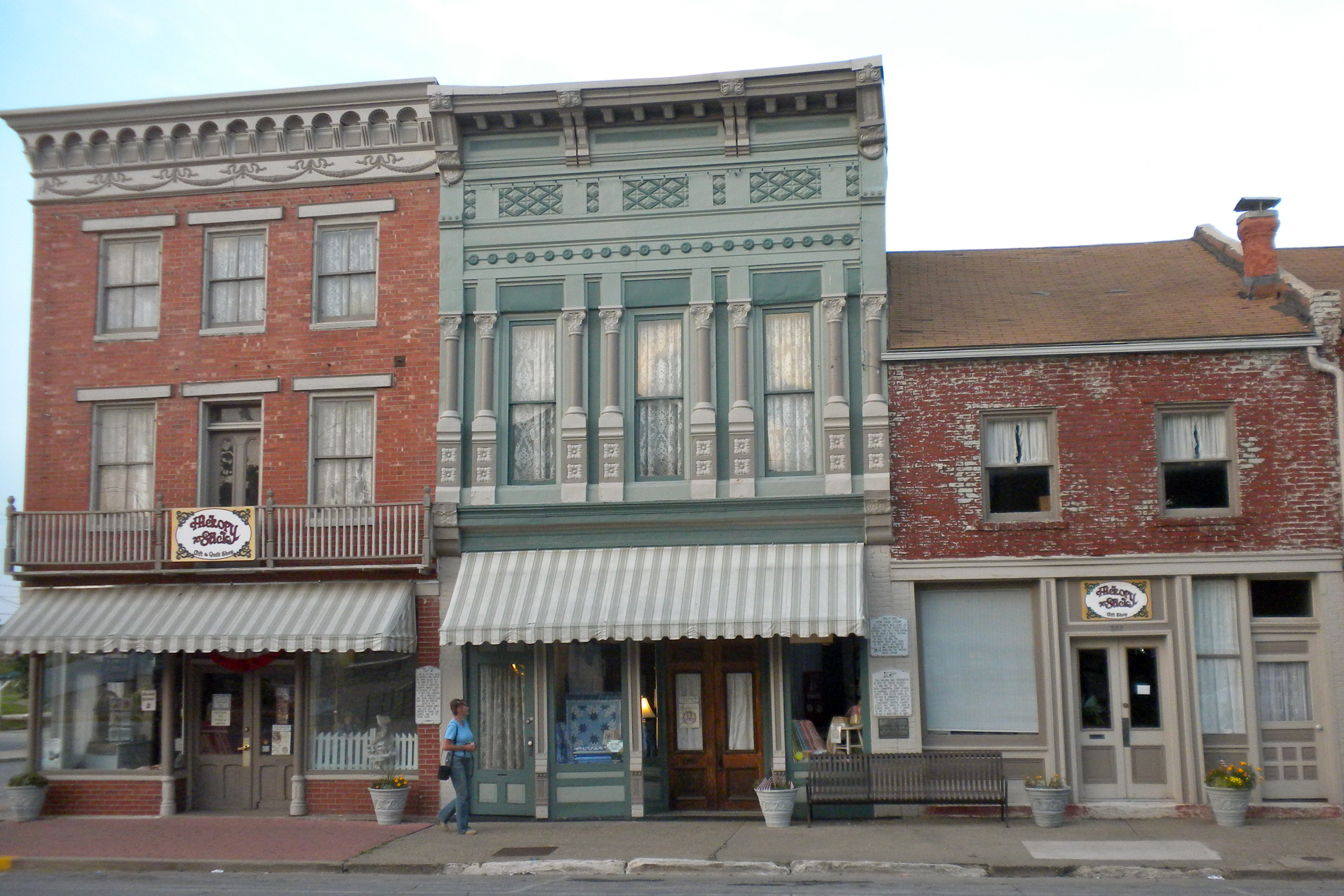
- Mark Twain Historic District, July 2010

- Location within Missouri Location within the United States
- Location: Bird, Main, and Hill Sts., Hannibal, Missouri
- Coordinates: 39°42′43″N 91°21′25″W
- Area: 6 acres (2.4 ha)
- Built: 1835
- Architect: Multiple
- NRHP reference No.: 78003398
- Added to NRHP: January 4, 1978

Mark Twain Historic District is a national historic district located at Hannibal, Marion County, Missouri. The district encompasses 20 contributing buildings in the central business district of Hannibal. It developed between about 1840 and 1936. Located in the district is the separately listed Mark Twain Boyhood Home. Other notable buildings include the Ice House Theatre (c. 1885), Randall House Antiques (c. 1845), Information Center (c. 1845), House of the Pilasters & Grant's Drug Store (1839–1844), "Becky Thatcher" House (c. 1840s), and the Mark Twain Memorial Lighthouse (1936).

It was listed on the National Register of Historic Places in 1978.
