= Alan Gribben =

American literary scholar (1941–2026)

Alan Dale Gribben (November 21, 1941 – May 9, 2026) was an American academic and literary scholar on Mark Twain who was professor emeritus of English at Auburn University at Montgomery in Alabama. He was distinguished research professor from 1998 to 2001 and the Dr. Guinevera A. Nance Alumni Professor from 2006 to 2009. Gribben engendered widespread controversy in 2011 when he announced the publication of expurgated versions of Twain's works.

== Life and career ==
Alan Gribben was born in Parsons, Kansas, on November 21, 1941. He built a career on the works of Mark Twain. He was a professor and longtime department head at Auburn University at Montgomery, where he retired as emeritus professor. He was an editor of the Mark Twain Journal.

His three-volume Mark Twain’s Literary Resources, published in 2019, is a "labour of love" according to The Guardian's Terena Bell, and documents all of Twain's readings throughout his life.

Gribben died of pancreatic cancer at his home in Montgomery, Alabama, on May 9, 2026, at the age of 84.

== Edited versions of Tom Sawyer and Huckleberry Finn ==
Gribben published a new combined edition of Twain's Tom Sawyer (1876) and Adventures of Huckleberry Finn (1884) with NewSouth Books in 2011. This edition replaced the word "nigger" (which occurs 219 times in the original Huckleberry Finn novel) with "slave", "Injun Joe" with "Indian Joe," and "half-breed" with "half-blood". At that time, no other changes to the original texts were planned besides these word replacements.

Gribben stated in the foreword to the 2011 edition that he wanted "to provide an option for teachers and other people not comfortable with 219 instances of that word". He added:

For nearly forty years I have led college classes, bookstore forums, and library reading groups in detailed discussions of Tom Sawyer and Huckleberry Finn in California, Texas, New York, and Alabama, and I always recoiled from uttering the racial slurs spoken by numerous characters, including Tom and Huck. I invariably substituted the word "slave" for Twain’s ubiquitous n-word whenever I read any passages aloud. Students and audience members seemed to prefer this expedient, and I could detect a visible sense of relief each time, as though a nagging problem with the text had been addressed.

But Gribben's view has been widely challenged. Cindy Lovell, executive director of the Mark Twain Boyhood Home & Museum, said, "The book is an anti-racist book and to change the language changes the power of the book." The removal of "nigger" from the text of Huckleberry Finn has been especially controversial. According to a writer at The Economist, one cannot "fully appreciate why 'nigger' is taboo today if you don't know how it was used back then, and you can't fully appreciate what it was like to be a slave if you don't know how slaves were addressed. The 'visible sense of relief' Gribben reports in his listeners is not, in fact, desirable; feeling discomfort when you read the book today is part of the point of reading it."

Gribben commented on the criticism, pointing out, for instance, that the n-word was de facto banned from many of the publications in which his critics called for its restoration: "I had to laugh whenever the professional commentators avoided pronouncing or printing the very word they were mocking me for substituting and that they are expecting public school teachers to read aloud in integrated classrooms." He suggested that Twain himself, "probably our most commercially minded author ever", might not be displeased with "a revision that would reinsert his boy books back into school classrooms and gain new readers", and cited a number of positive responses he received from teachers.

In 2025, Black Belt Press published "translated dialect editions" of Tom Sawyer and of Huckleberry Finn, edited by Gribben and his wife and frequent collaborator Irene Wong. These editions went beyond the changes in the 2011 combined edition to emend Twain's renderings of Black characters' speech, bringing further controversy.

== Awards ==
- Alumni Faculty Service Award, Auburn University at Montgomery (2005)
