= Mark Twain: Words & Music =

2011 spoken word studio album

- Tri-fold album cover includes 40-page booklet of liner notes with photos, narrative and lyrics.

Studio album by Jimmy Buffett, Garrison Keillor, Clint Eastwood, Emmylou Harris, Doyle Lawson & Quicksilver, Rhonda Vincent, Bradley Walker, Carl Jackson, The Church Sisters, Angela Lovell, Sheryl Crow, Brad Paisley, Marty Raybon, Val Storey, Vince Gill, Joe Diffie, Ricky Skaggs
- Released: September 2011
- Recorded: Nashville, August 2010 – January 2011
- Genre: Americana
- Length: 84:53
- Label: Mailboat Records
- Producer: Carl Jackson

Professional ratings
Review scores
Source	Rating
Allmusic	3.5/5 stars

Mark Twain: Words & Music is a double-CD produced by Grammy Award-winner Carl Jackson, a Bluegrass and Country music artist, as a benefit for the Mark Twain Boyhood Home & Museum, a non-profit foundation in Hannibal, Missouri. The project tells the life story of Mark Twain (Samuel Clemens) in spoken word and song and features many well-known artists. "Run Mississippi" by Rhonda Vincent reached #2 on the Bluegrass Today charts the same week that "Comet Ride" by Ricky Skaggs reached #7. The album was released on September 21, 2011 and is the most downloaded Americana album of all time on AirPlay Direct, an online music source for radio stations, with more than 7,000 downloads its first year.

The spoken word passages include narration and excerpts from Twain's writing to form the biography. Corresponding songs follow each spoken word track to further tell the story of the Missouri boy who grew up alongside the Mississippi River and eventually became America's most popular author. Jimmy Buffett provides the voice of Huckleberry Finn, Garrison Keillor narrates, Clint Eastwood voices Mark Twain, and Angela Lovell performs as Twain's daughter, Susy Clemens. Singers include Emmylou Harris, Doyle Lawson & Quicksilver, Rhonda Vincent, Bradley Walker, Carl Jackson, The Church Sisters, Sheryl Crow, Brad Paisley, Marty Raybon, Val Storey, Vince Gill, Joe Diffie, and Ricky Skaggs. The album includes several new songs written specifically for the project. Museum director Cindy Lovell conceived the project. She wrote the narrative for the spoken word passages and served as executive producer with Carl Jackson.

== Track listing 1 ==
Disc One

1. "Hello yourself, and see how you like it..." (Narrative: Mark Twain/Cindy Lovell; Background score: "Comet Ride" performed by Andy Leftwich) Jimmy Buffett, Garrison Keillor, Clint Eastwood – 1:24
2. "When Halley Came To Jackson" (Mary Chapin Carpenter) Emmylou Harris – 3:11
3. "Hannibal, Missouri, where my boyhood was spent..." (Narrative: Mark Twain/Cindy Lovell; Background score: "Comet Ride" performed by Carl Jackson/Andy Leftwich; "Uncle John's Farm" written and performed by Carl Jackson) Garrison Keillor, Jimmy Buffett, Clint Eastwood – 6:28
4. "Better Times A' Comin'" (Cal Veale) Doyle Lawson & Quicksilver – 2:37
5. "He agreed to teach me the Mississippi River..." (Narrative: Mark Twain/Cindy Lovell; Background score: "Run Mississippi" performed by Carl Jackson) Garrison Keillor, Jimmy Buffett, Clint Eastwood – 3:44
6. "Run Mississippi" (Priscilla Houliston/Carl Jackson) Rhonda Vincent – 2:59
7. "Several years of variegated vagabondizing..." (Narrative: Mark Twain/Cindy Lovell; Background score: Medley: "Dixie," "Ink," and "Mexican Telegram" arranged and performed by Carl Jackson; "Dixie" written by Daniel D. Emmett, "Mexican Telegram" written by Carl Jackson) Garrison Keillor, Jimmy Buffett, Clint Eastwood – 2:29
8. "A Cowboy In His Soul" (Bryan Kennedy/Jim Rushing) Bradley Walker – 2:07
9. "It liberates the vandal to travel..." (Narrative: Mark Twain/Cindy Lovell; Background score: "Safe Water" performed by Carl Jackson) Garrison Keillor, Jimmy Buffett, Clint Eastwood – 1:51
10. "Safe Water" (Carl Jackson/Jerry Salley) Carl Jackson – 3:37
11. "You ain't ever to love anybody but me..." (Narrative: Mark Twain/Cindy Lovell; Background score: "Sam & Livy" written and performed by Carl Jackson) Garrison Keillor, Clint Eastwood – 2:07
12. "I Wandered By A Brookside" (Traditional/Music by Barbara Berry) The Church Sisters – 3:37
13. "It was a mighty nice family..." (Narrative: Mark Twain/Cindy Lovell; Background score: "Little Creatures" written and performed by Carl Jackson) Garrison Keillor, Clint Eastwood, Angela Lovell – 3:49
14. "Beautiful Dreamer" (Stephen Foster) Sheryl Crow – 2:06

== Track listing 2 ==
Disc Two

1. "Don't scrunch up like that, Huckleberry..." (Narrative: Mark Twain/Cindy Lovell; Background score: "Comet Ride" performed by Carl Jackson) Garrison Keillor, Clint Eastwood, Jimmy Buffett – 2:11
2. "Huck Finn Blues" (Emily Hayes, Carl Jackson, Danny Wilson) Brad Paisley – 5:36
3. "The crows would gather on the railing and talk about me..." (Narrative: Mark Twain/Cindy Lovell; Background score: "Indian Crow" performed by Carl Jackson) Garrison Keillor, Clint Eastwood – 2:51
4. "Indian Crow" – (Carl Jackson/Jerry Salley) Marty Raybon – 3:39
5. "So wounded, so broken-hearted..." (Narrative: Mark Twain/Cindy Lovell; Background score: "Tick, Tock, Tick..." written and performed by Carl Jackson) Garrison Keillor, Clint Eastwood – 2:31
6. "Love Is On Our Side" (Tish Hinojosa) Val Storey – 3:50
7. "Wheresoever she was, there was Eden..." (Narrative: Mark Twain/Cindy Lovell; Background score: "Safe Water" performed by Carl Jackson) Garrison Keillor, Clint Eastwood – 2:18
8. "I Know You By Heart" (Eve Nelson/Diane Scanlon) Vince Gill – 3:58
9. "My conscience got to stirring me up hotter than ever..." (Narrative: Mark Twain/Cindy Lovell; Background score: "Indian Crow" performed by Rob Ickes) Garrison Keillor, Clint Eastwood, Jimmy Buffett – 3:21
10. "Ink" (Carl Jackson/Don Poythress/Tony Wood) Joe Diffie – 4:32
11. "The report of my death was an exaggeration..." (Narrative: Mark Twain/Cindy Lovell; Background score: "Comet Ride" performed by Carl Jackson) Garrison Keillor, Clint Eastwood, Jimmy Buffett 1:29
12. "Comet Ride" (Carl Jackson) Ricky Skaggs – 2:52
13. "The truth, mainly..." (Narrative: Mark Twain/Cindy Lovell; Background score: "Beautiful Dreamer" performed by Catherine Marx) Jimmy Buffett, Garrison Keillor – 2:03

== Personnel ==
- Carl Jackson: Acoustic Guitar, Banjo, Gut String Guitar, Lead Vocal, Baritone Vocal, Tenor Vocal, Background Vocal, High Baritone Vocal
- Jimmy Buffett: Spoken Word
- Garrison Keillor: Spoken Word
- Clint Eastwood: Spoken Word
- Joey Martin: Tenor Vocal
- Tony Creasman: Drums, Percussion
- Kevin Grantt: Bass
- Catherine Marx: Piano, Synth
- Andy Leftwich: Fiddle
- Adam Steffey: Mandolin
- Corey Hensley: Lead Vocal
- Josh Swift: Dobro, Low Tenor Vocal
- Doyle Lawson: Mandolin, Baritone Vocal
- Dale Perry: Banjo
- Rhonda Vincent: Lead Vocal
- Sonya Isaacs: Tenor Vocal, High Baritone Vocal
- Rob Ickes: Dobro, Weisenborn
- Bradley Walker: Lead Vocal
- Cia Cherryholmes: High Baritone Vocal, Tenor Vocal
- Jerry Salley: Background Vocal, Tenor Vocal
- Mike Johnson: Steel
- Savannah Church: Lead Vocal
- Sarah Church: Tenor Vocal
- Angela Lovell: Spoken Word
- Sheryl Crow: Lead Vocal
- Brad Paisley: Acoustic Guitar, Lead Vocal
- Marty Raybon: Lead Vocal
- Johnny Rawls: Banjo
- Val Storey: Lead Vocal
- Vince Gill: Lead Vocal
- Joe Diffie: Lead Vocal
- Ricky Skaggs: Lead Vocal

== Technical personnel ==
- Carl Jackson: Producer, Executive Producer
- Cindy Lovell: Executive Producer
- Kyle Manner: Engineer
- John (Hip-Hop) Caldwell: Engineer
- Jimmy Buffett: Engineer
- Noah Smith: Engineer
- Carlos Martin: Engineer
- Jim Smith: Engineer
- Richard Barrow: Engineer
- Kendal Marcy: Engineer
- Drew Bollman: Engineer
- Lee Groitzsch: Engineer
- Luke Wooten: Mixing, Mastering

== Reviews ==
The reviews of the album have been positive. Shortly after the album's release the "L.A. Times" review noted, "Producer Carl Jackson and his co-executive producer Cindy Lovell show deep respect and affection for Twain’s estimable place in American culture." Allmusic wrote that the album was "a celebration of Twain's life and work that, if a bit muted and careful, is a pleasing journey through the world of Twain", while Americana Music News noted the "remarkable line-up," and "Outlaw Magazine"'s Gregg Andrews wrote, "Thanks to the excellent interplay between the narrative and songs, the CD gives listeners a fascinating introduction to Mark Twain." The album ranked 28 in Folk Music the week of July 6, 2012.
