= WriteAPrisoner.com =

American organization for prisoner rehabilitation

- Founded: 2000
- Founder: Adam Lovell
- Type: Online pen-pal and rehabilitation platform
- Purpose: Criminal justice reform, social connection
- Headquarters: Edgewater, Volusia County, Florida
- Members: 17,000 inmate members, 800,000 registered members
- Official language: Primarily English
- Website: writeaprisoner.com

WriteAPrisoner.com is an online Florida-based business. The business's goal is to reduce recidivism through a variety of methods that include positive correspondence with pen pals on the outside, educational opportunities, job placement avenues, resource guides, scholarships for children affected by crime, and advocacy. The site began primarily as a place to post pen-pal profiles and requests for legal assistance for inmates and has evolved to take a more comprehensive approach to addressing the challenges in the life of an inmate. Studies show many inmates have experienced trauma early in their lives that may have been the impetus for the actions that led to incarceration.

== Background ==
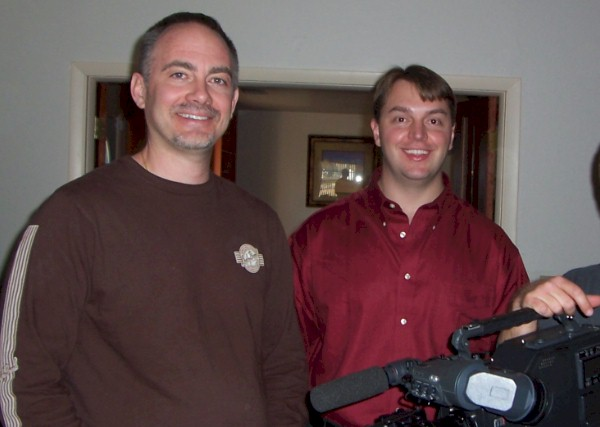
Producer Christopher Hines and founder Adam Lovell filming E!'s True Hollywood Story episode about WriteAPrisoner.com

There are approximately 17,000 inmates profiled on the site, most of whom are incarcerated in the United States; however, the site also includes international inmates. Although the site provides no Internet access of any kind to inmates, it has often been called the MySpace and Facebook for inmates by the media. Because the business is housed online and includes inmate profiles, it has been compared to social media; however, most agencies recognize it as promoting traditional pen-pal postal mail because the site provides no mechanism for inmates to access the site online. By 2003, the site had about 10,000 hits per day and presented profiles from inmates in about a dozen countries. Inmates using WriteAPrisoner.com only have access to postal mail. Inmates pay at least $65 per year (with additional options that cost more) to post their profile and photo, which are viewed by the public at no cost. The site encourages writing directly to inmates or sending a first message through its free e-mail forwarding service. The founder of the company is Adam Lovell, author of WriteAPrisoner.com's SELF-HELP GUIDE FOR INMATES: Flourishing Through Adversity. In 2010, the website received about 2 million page views per month.

== Media ==
The site received national media attention in July 2003 when Susan Smith, a young mother convicted of killing her children, posted a profile seeking pen-pals, which received 800,000 hits. Smith received more than 6,000 letters in response to her profile. The South Carolina Department of Corrections issued a press release related to the incident. WriteAPrisoner.com removed the profile at Smith's request. The site received some criticism when its spokesperson used the term "freak show" to describe the media coverage of the Susan Smith story. The site later issued a press release apologizing and stating that the term had been taken out of context.

The site has been featured on many programs including 20/20 and E! True Hollywood Story. In March 2006, the site made local news when it posted a profile for Adrian Peeler, who was convicted in the killing of an eight-year-old boy and his mother. The site immediately removed Peeler's profile when the story was featured in the Connecticut Post. The site had also featured a profile for Peeler's brother, Russell Peeler, who was involved in the murder. His profile was also removed by the site. Several states have placed a ban on inmate penpal sites in response to these issues, which the site founder has stated is a violation of the First Amendment.

On October 28, 2014, Lifetime aired the Prison Wives Club reality show, which features some couples from WriteAPrisoner.com in the series. Artist Benjamin Wills' popular exhibit Airplanes at the Kansas City Public Library featured paper airplanes made by inmates contacted through the site. In 2019, Netflix released a new show, Exhibit A, in which an inmate from WriteAPrisoner.com was featured in the first episode. The third and fourth season of WE tv's Love After Lockup also featured inmates from the site.

Some controversies involved claims of inmates misleading the public. When the state of Missouri investigated claims that several dozen female inmates were deceiving male pen pals, the proactive response of the site resulted in a positive response by the public. A study conducted by the University of Louisville reported that not all inmates on the site accurately reported their crimes or release dates at one point. However, this study was rebutted by the site. WriteAPrisoner.com provides a link from each inmate's profile to his or her respective department of corrections website so the public can verify the information. Studies have confirmed the act of maintaining a pen-pal relationship for an inmate has had proven benefits to the inmate's well-being, reform, and recovery from substance abuse. Some inmates have used the website to gain support from the public to help overturn wrongful convictions. Others found freedom through the site after their profiles attracted the attention of attorneys and human rights groups.

In 2020, TikTok users discovered the site, generating more than 65 million views, with the trend continuing.

== Research ==
Universities continue to conduct research surrounding the benefits of inmate correspondence and even participating in letter-writing with inmates. In 2019, Duke Law hosted a Write A Prisoner letter-writing event as part of the National Lawyers Guild's recognition of the Week Against Mass Incarceration. In 2015, University of Warwick shared findings of research at the Economic and Social Research Council (ESRC) Festival of Social Science. The study involved prison pen pals in 52 prisons throughout England and Wales and cited numerous mental health benefits to inmates. San Diego State University graduate student Tania Mejia-O'Donnell, a 2018-2019 Inamori Fellow, explored inmates' pen pal experiences through WriteaPrisoner.com.

== Legal ==
The United States Court of Appeals for the Seventh Circuit has upheld inmates' right to receive e-mail printouts from online pen pals. The United States Court of Appeals for the Ninth Circuit also found that inmates have the constitutional right to seek pen pals through websites. An Arizona law that barred inmates from posting profiles on WriteAPrisoner.com and similar websites was struck down after the ACLU challenged it in court. In considering legislation which would prohibit inmates from utilizing social media such as Facebook, officials in South Carolina made a point to exclude WriteAPrisoner.com from the bill, citing WriteAPrisoner.com's vetting process of inmates' information and the fact that it does not provide a mechanism for Internet contact for inmates. While WriteAPrisoner.com does not allow inmates any form of actual Internet contact, many prisons now have services such as Corrlinks, which allows inmates monitored email access for a fee.

According to the site, the goal is to work with states' departments of corrections to ensure that the First Amendment rights of inmates are protected. The site has previously collaborated with the ACLU and the Florida Justice Institute regarding rights of inmates and has been represented by the Florida Justice Institute. The site's stated policy includes a zero-tolerance approach towards scams committed by inmates as well as scams committed against inmates.
