= Mark Twain Cave =

Cave in Missouri, United States

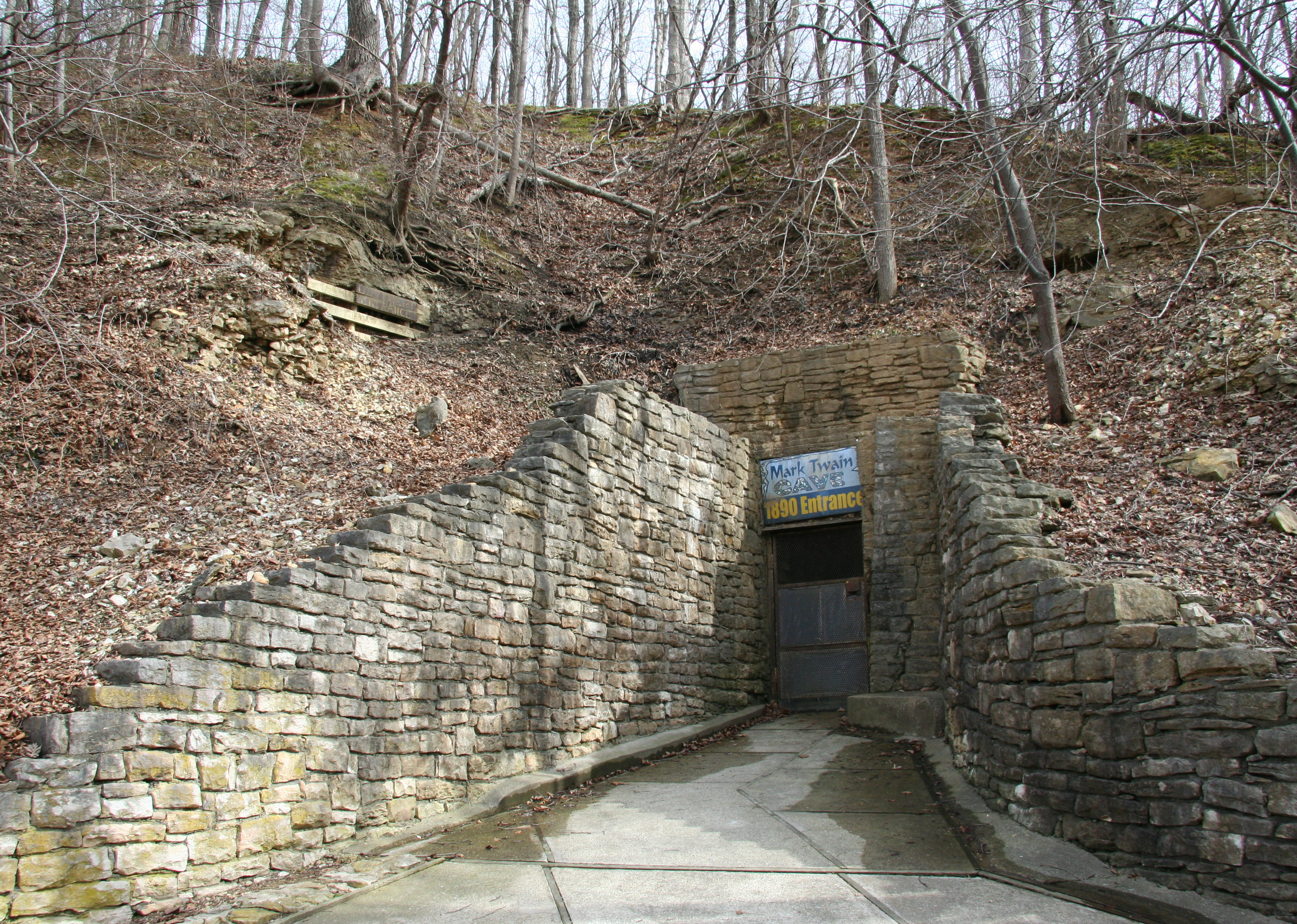
- The 1890 entrance to Mark Twain Cave
- Interactive map of Mark Twain Cave
- Location: Hannibal, Missouri, U.S.
- Coordinates: 39°41′19″N 91°19′54″W
- Show cave opened: 1886

U.S. National Natural Landmark
- Designated: 1972

Mark Twain Cave — originally McDowell's Cave — is a show cave located near Hannibal, Missouri. It was named for author Mark Twain. Twain lived in Hannibal from 1839 to 1853, age 4 to 17. It is the oldest operating show cave in the state, giving tours continuously since 1886. Along with nearby Cameron Cave, it became a registered National Natural Landmark in 1972, with a citation reading "Exceptionally good examples of the maze type of cavern development." The cave — as "McDougal's Cave" — plays an important role in Twain's 1876 novel The Adventures of Tom Sawyer and was renamed in honor of the author in 1880.

== Early history ==
=== Geology ===
Geologically, Mark Twain Cave and its nearby neighbor Cameron Cave differ from most of the caves in Missouri. Both are believed to be remnants of a much larger cave system cut apart by a glacier and millions of years of erosion, leading to speculation by geologists and common citizens alike that there may be further undiscovered caves in the Hannibal region. This speculation was heightened in 2006 when the entrance to a previously unknown cave was found during construction of a new elementary school. A major difference is that Mark Twain Cave has a near total lack of speleothems, mineral deposits like stalagmites and stalactites in large open areas. Mark Twain Cave and Cameron Cave instead have a multitude of narrow, winding passages. The caves are made mostly of a soft limestone called Louisiana Lithographic Limestone that is found only in a 35-mile (56 km) area around Hannibal and Louisiana, Missouri. The limestone has been estimated by geologists to be about 350 million years old, while the cave passages were formed some 100 million years ago. Mark Twain Cave covers some 3 miles (4.8 km) with four entrances and 260 passages and has a year-round temperature of 52 °F (11 °C).

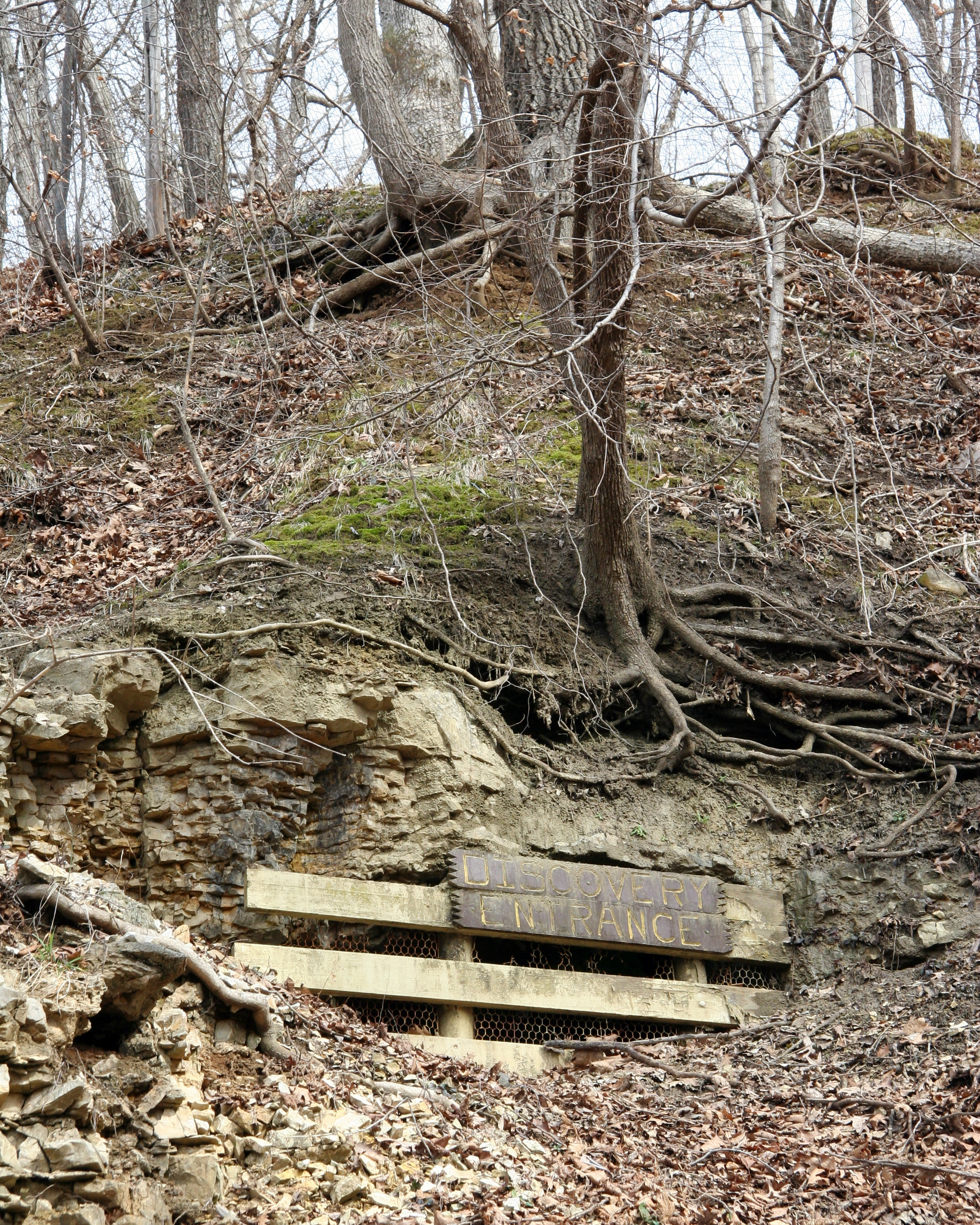
Original entrance discovered by Jack Simms

=== Discovery and first uses ===
While it is possible that prehistoric Native Americans were aware of the cave, the earliest documentation claims that Mark Twain Cave was discovered in the winter of 1819–1820 by a local hunter, Jack Simms, when his dog chased an animal into a small hillside opening south of current-day Hannibal. Upon investigation with torches, he and his brothers found that the small opening led to a large underground labyrinth. The cave proved a popular diversion for mid-19th century Hannibal residents, especially children, including the young Mark Twain. These childhood explorations would later reappear in five of Mark Twain's books. The proximity to the Mississippi River and its cooling breezes made the small valley between the river bluffs containing the caves a popular site for family picnics and church outings in the summertime.

=== The "mad" scientist and the outlaw ===
Pioneering Hannibal physician Joseph Nash McDowell purchased the cave in the late 1840s and used it for several years as a laboratory for medical research on human corpses. His belief that traditional burial that 'stifled the soul of the dead' and that a different type of interment would aid communication between living and dead, led to one of the cave's more notorious episodes, and inspiration for Twain, when McDowell placed his recently deceased child Amanda in a preserving coffin inside the cave work space. Twain's book Life on the Mississippi offered a description of the activities:

In my time the person who owned it [the cave] turned it into a mausoleum for his daughter, age fourteen. The body of this poor child was put in a copper cylinder filled with alcohol, and this suspended in one of the dismal avenues of the cave.

However in 1849, when McDowell learned that locals had been daring each other to break into the cave and open the cylinder, disrespecting his child’s remains, he had the body removed for a more traditional, and safer, burial in the family vault behind the newly-built Missouri Medical College where he worked. A fable of the body being forcibly removed by angry Hannibal citizens, having heard of it from the children who had used the body to enhance their telling of ghost stories, was added to the rumors that swirled around McDowell. Many in St. Louis believed that McDowell also used bodies stolen from local graves for his medical examinations, a not uncommon practice prior to the 20th century. Twain would weave that suspicion into the plot of Tom Sawyer in a grave robbing scene involving Injun Joe.

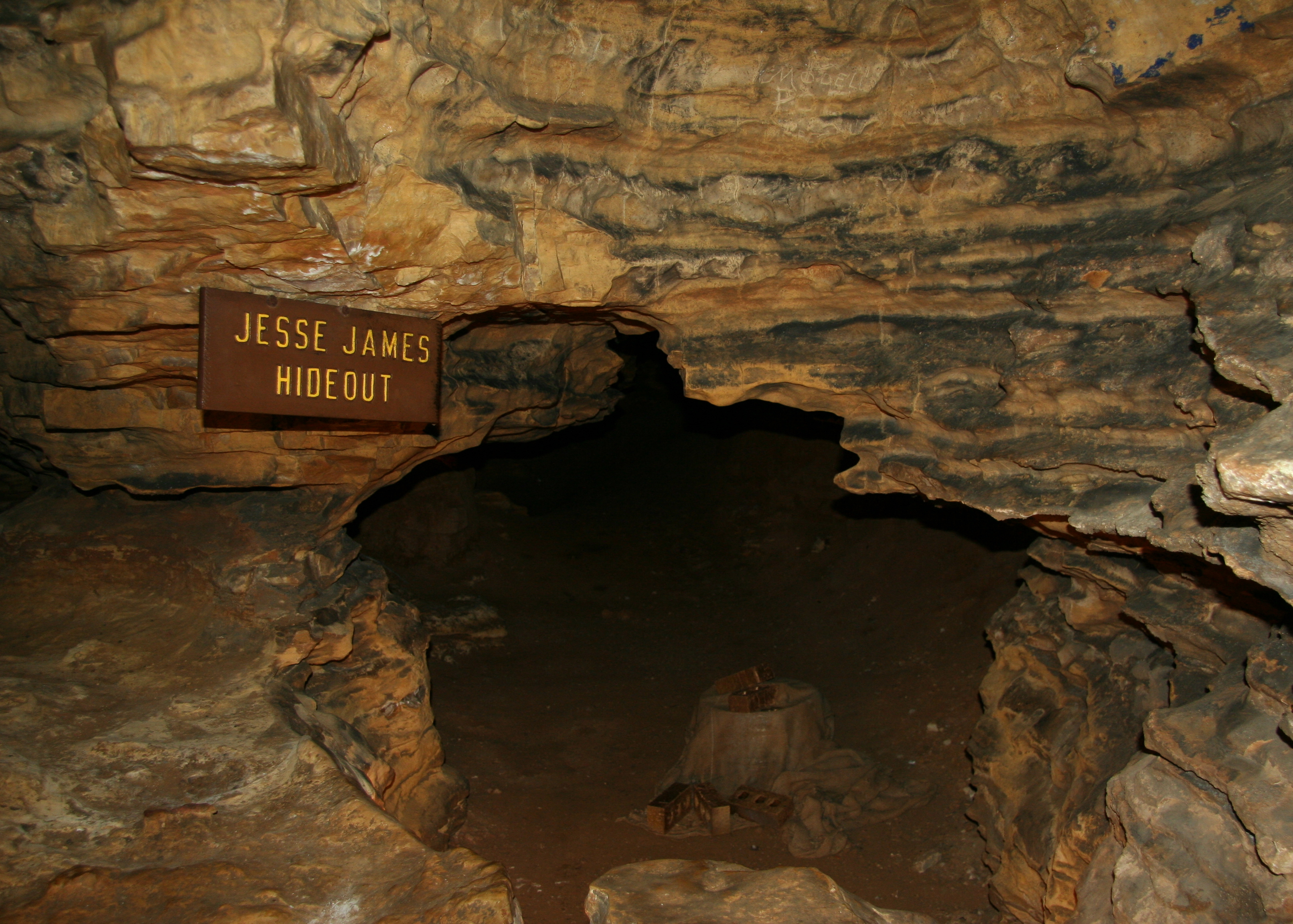
Alleged Jesse James hideout

According to folklore, McDowell used the cave as a secret Confederate weapons storage cache during the American Civil War. McDowell was an ardent Southern supporter, and indeed had a stash of cannons and muskets, previously intended to aid the rebels in his home state of Kentucky in 1846, stockpiled at his St. Louis medical college, as evidenced when an angry mob gathered outside the building, mistakenly accusing McDowell of murder. One of the former Confederates who likely had knowledge of the cave from his war service was the legendary outlaw Jesse James. James had ridden with Quantrill's Raiders and Bloody Bill Anderson throughout the Little Dixie area southwest of Hannibal. In September 1879, two weeks prior to the robbery of a train in Glendale, Missouri, the cave proved a ready and secure hideout for a few days rest. James even signed and dated one of the caves walls using a pencil.

The cave was but a labyrinth of crooked aisles that ran into each other and out again and led nowhere. It was said that one might wander days and nights together through its intricate tangle of rifts and chasms and never find the end of the cave.

— Mark Twain, The Adventures of Tom Sawyer

== Advent of tourism ==
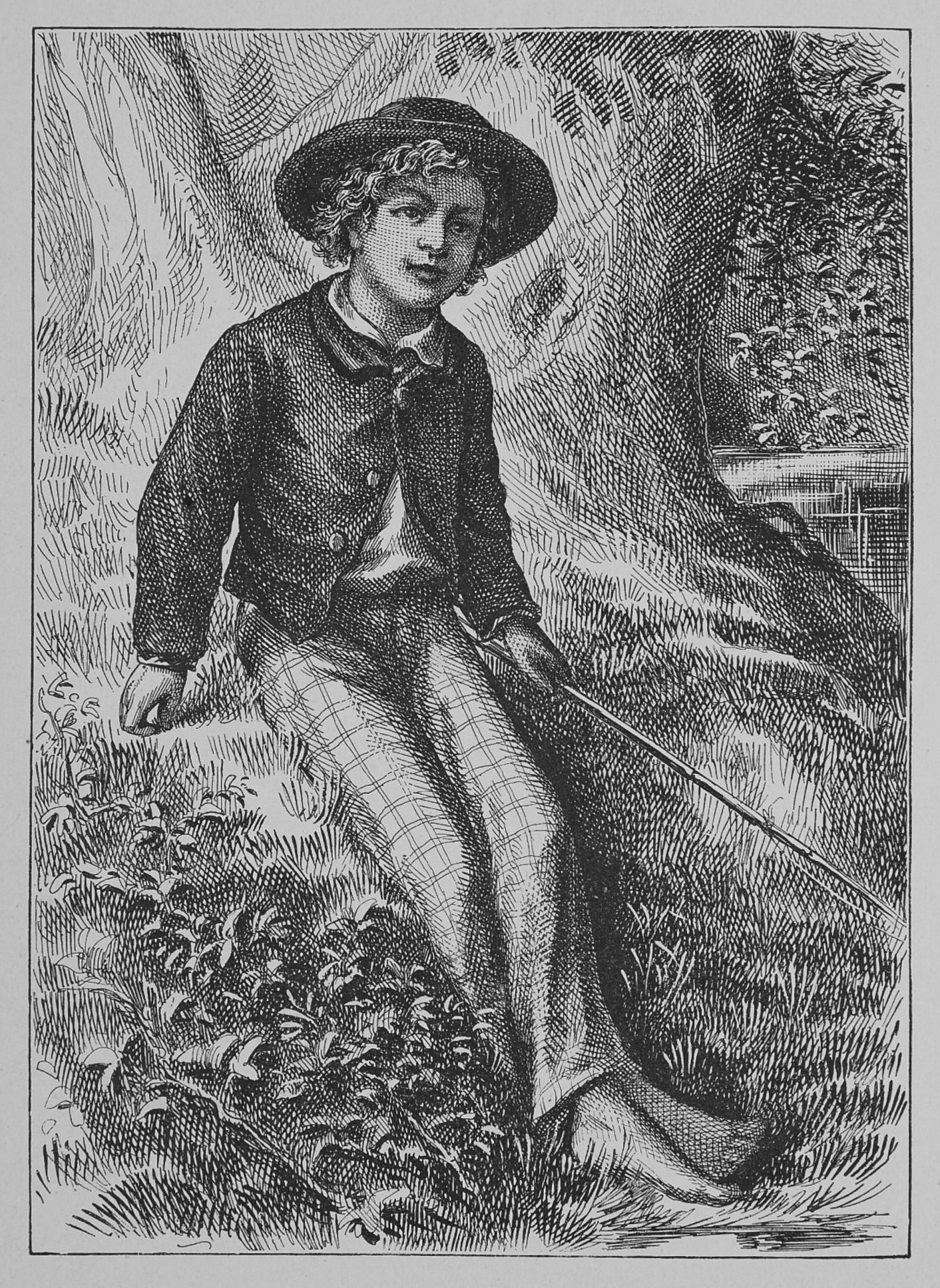
Tom Sawyer, an explorer of MacDougal's Cave

The cave was little known outside of the immediate Hannibal region until 1876, when Twain's landmark novel The Adventures of Tom Sawyer was published. Soon tourists worldwide were making the journey to see the real-life cave that provided the basis for the novel's fictional MacDougal's Cave, where Tom and Becky Thatcher's lives were endangered by Injun Joe. The first regular tours by paying customers began in 1886 when local farmer John East charged tourists a dime to see some of the places inside the cave made famous by the novel. East excavated an entrance for these tours, but found it was difficult to enter through it. In 1890, a new entry to the cave was created nearby.

For over fifty years, tourists saw the cave much as Twain had in his youth, by candlelight or lantern. That changed in 1939 when electric lights were added to the tour areas of the cave by the Cameron family. The cave had been purchased in 1923 by Judge E.T. Cameron, who had been a guide at the cave as a young man. Through a succession of owners in the late 1800s and early 1900s, Cameron had served as manager of the cave property. He was the first to establish standardized tour routes within the cave, construct a small building near the entrance for ticket sales, and advertise the cave in newspapers as "Mark Twain Cave".

=== Discovery of Cameron Cave ===
One cold winter day in 1925, Judge Evan Thomas Cameron's son Archie was caring for the family's cattle herd when he noticed steam rising from a sinkhole in the ground across the valley from Mark Twain Cave. After some digging, he discovered a large natural underground room. Further exploration found a cave even larger than Mark Twain Cave, with more twisted pathways. This "sister" cave was named for the Cameron family. Tours of Cameron Cave are offered seasonally. Tours through this cave are led by flashlights, giving a much different view of the cave systems.

=== Current status ===
The entire cave complex is privately owned by Todd and Austin Curry, who purchased the complex in 2020. It had previously been owned by the Coleberd/Bogart family, descendants of Judge Cameron. The complex includes the Mark Twain and Cameron caves, Hannibal Trolley Tours, the Mark Twain Live Show, a campground, a gift shop/visitors center, and a winery. One of the most notable visitors was U.S. President Jimmy Carter, who toured Mark Twain Cave with his family in 1979. The guided tour of Mark Twain Cave takes approximately 55 minutes, while the larger Cameron Cave tour averages one hour twenty minutes in length. Mark Twain Cave is open year-around except Thanksgiving and Christmas days. Cameron Cave is open from Memorial Day through Labor Day only.

=== Notable signatures ===
There are about 250,000 signatures spread throughout the Mark Twain Cave. They are written in many different ways, including candle smoke, paint, carvings, pencil, and even berry juice. Many important visitors over the years have their names etched into the walls of the cave. For decades, cave owners, scholars, and visitors searched for the signature of Twain. On July 26, 2019, Cindy Lovell, former director of both the Mark Twain Boyhood Home & Museum in Hannibal and the Mark Twain House in Hartford, Connecticut, discovered "Clemens" (Twain's birth surname) written on the cave wall during a special tour for Twain scholars. She and owner Linda Coleberd had been searching for the signature for decades. Twain scholars Alan Gribben and Kevin Mac Donnell authenticated the signature.
