= Livin', Lovin', Losin': Songs of the Louvin Brothers =

Studio album by Various Artists
- Released: September 30, 2003
- Genres: Country, Gospel
- Length: 47:15
- Label: Universal South
- Producer: Carl Jackson

Livin', Lovin', Losin': Songs of the Louvin Brothers is a tribute album to the music of The Louvin Brothers, released in 2003.

The Louvin Brothers were an American country music duo composed of brothers Ira Louvin and Charlie Louvin. They helped popularize close harmony, a genre of country music. Their partnership ended in 1963 with Charlie continuing a long and successful career as a solo artist. Ira died in an automobile accident in 1965 and Charlie died in 2011 from pancreatic cancer.

== History ==
Ira Louvin's daughter, Kathy Louvin, approached producer Carl Jackson with the idea of a Louvin Brothers tribute album. Jackson then enlisted the various artists who performed on the tracks. The project was kept a secret from Charlie, the surviving Louvin Brother, until he accidentally heard about it and later became involved in the sessions.

Guest vocalists include Glen Campbell, Johnny Cash, James Taylor, Emmylou Harris, Alison Krauss, Vince Gill, Merle Haggard, Linda Ronstadt, Dolly Parton, and many others.

The recitation on "Keep Your Eyes on Jesus" was one of the last sessions Cash did before his death.

== Reception ==
Professional ratings
Review scores
| Source | Rating |
|---|---|
| Allmusic | 2.5/5 stars |
| No Depression | (Favorable) |
| PopMatters | (Favorable) |

At the Grammy Awards of 2004, Livin', Lovin', Losin' won the Grammy Award for Best Country Album and James Taylor and Alison Krauss won the Grammy Award for Best Country Collaboration with Vocals for their duet on "How's the World Treating You". In 2004, it won the International Bluegrass Music Association Award for the Recorded Event of the Year.

While applauding individual performances in his Allmusic review, Thom Jurek stated "[The Louvins] were successful during their era, the 1950s and early '60s, for a reason: they offered a view of life, love, loss, and the ever-present and eerie power of a God just beyond the pale with genuine wonder, fear, and pathos. Performed by superstars, legends, and others, most of the 16 tracks on Livin', Lovin', Losin' add nothing to the originals and, if anything, make somewhat generic what was special in its iconoclasm. The Louvins would not have a recording contract in this day and age, and any attempt by Carl Jackson to make them sound contemporary enough to be relevant in the stupid paranoid world of Nash Vegas country music circa 2003 is just ridiculous."

Conversely, Hank Kalet in his PopMatters review stated "The disc... [creates] a rarity of sorts: a fully fleshed out, perfectly executed tribute disc that captures the spirit of the recording artist it means to honor while also offering a collection of contemporary performances that are worth listening to on their own merit. The playing is flawless, the vocals inspired and the song selection a perfect glimpse into what made the Louvins one of the most influential acts in country history."

== Track listing ==
All tracks are written by Charlie Louvin and Ira Louvin unless otherwise noted.

| No. | Title | Writer(s) | Performer(s) | Length |
|---|---|---|---|---|
| 1. | "Intro to Charlie and Ira" | | | 0:26 |
| 2. | "Cash on the Barrelhead" | | Joe Nichols and Rhonda Vincent | 3:17 |
| 3. | "My Baby's Gone" | Hazel Houser | Emmylou Harris and Rodney Crowell | 3:31 |
| 4. | "How's the World Treating You" | Chet Atkins, Boudleaux Bryant | James Taylor and Alison Krauss | 3:18 |
| 5. | "I Can't Keep You in Love With Me" | | Vince Gill and Terri Clark | 2:58 |
| 6. | "Must You Throw Dirt in My Face" | Bill Anderson | Merle Haggard and Carl Jackson | 2:51 |
| 7. | "If I Could Only Win Your Love" | | Ronnie Dunn and Rebecca Lynn Howard | 2:34 |
| 8. | "When I Stop Dreaming" | | Glen Campbell and Leslie Satcher | 4:00 |
| 9. | "I Wish You Knew" | | Kathy Louvin and Pamela Brown Hayes | 2:27 |
| 10. | "The New Partner Waltz" | | Linda Ronstadt and Carl Jackson | 2:50 |
| 11. | "Are You Teasing Me" | | Patty Loveless and Jon Randall | 3:02 |
| 12. | "I Don't Believe You've Met My Baby" | Autry Inman | Dierks Bentley and Harley Allen | 2:40 |
| 13. | "You're Running Wild" | Don Winters, Ray Edenton | Carl Jackson, Larry Cordle and Jerry Salley | 2:40 |
| 14. | "The Angels Rejoiced" | | Dolly Parton and Sonya Isaacs | 2:38 |
| 15. | "Let Us Travel, Travel On" | | Marty Stuart and Del McCoury | 2:39 |
| 16. | "Keep Your Eyes on Jesus" | | Johnny Cash, Pam Tillis, and The Jordanaires | 3:24 |

== Personnel ==
- Harley Allen – vocals
- Dierks Bentley – vocals
- Bruce Bouton – pedal steel guitar
- Glen Campbell – vocals
- Johnny Cash – vocals
- Terri Clark – vocals
- Larry Cordle – vocals
- J. T. Corenflos – guitar
- Tony Creasman – drums
- Rodney Crowell – vocals
- Glen Duncan – fiddle
- Ronnie Dunn – vocals
- Vince Gill – vocals
- Emory Gordy – bass
- Kevin Grantt – bass
- Mike Bub – bass
- Merle Haggard – vocals
- Emmylou Harris – vocals
- David Harvey – mandolin
- Pamela Brown Hayes – vocals
- Rebecca Lynn Howard – vocals
- Roy Huskey, Jr. – bass
- Sonya Isaacs – vocals
- Carl Jackson – vocals, guitar, banjo, mandolin, percussion
- Mike Johnson – pedal steel guitar
- The Jordanaires – vocals
- Randy Kohrs – dobro
- Alison Krauss – vocals
- Kathy Louvin – vocals
- Patty Loveless – vocals
- Catherine Marx – piano
- Del McCoury – vocals
- Joe Nichols – vocals
- Martin Parker – drums
- Dolly Parton – vocals
- Jon Randall – vocals
- Matt Rollings – piano
- Linda Ronstadt – vocals
- Jerry Salley – vocals
- Leslie Satcher – vocals
- Adam Steffey – mandolin
- Marty Stuart – vocals, mandolin, electronic drums
- James Taylor – vocals
- Pam Tillis – vocals
- Steve Turner – drums
- Jim Van Cleve – fiddle
- Rhonda Vincent – vocals

Production notes:

- Carl Jackson – producer, executive producer, vocal engineer, song notes
- Kathy Louvin – executive producer
- John "Babbacombe" Lee – engineer
- Luke Wooten – engineer, vocal engineer
- Jim Brady – vocal engineer
- John Carter Cash – vocal engineer
- Hank Williams – mastering
- Tom Wilmeth – liner notes
- Richard Pimsner – assistant
- Beth Middleworth – art direction, design
- Susan Levy – art direction

== Chart performance ==
| Chart (2003) | Peak position |
|---|---|
| U.S. Billboard Top Country Albums | 44 |
