= Dick Conant =

American boater who vanished at sea under mysterious circumstances

- Born: 1951; U.S.
- Disappeared: December 2014; U.S.
- Occupation: Boater
- Known for: Mysterious disappearance

Dick Conant (born 1951) was an American boater who disappeared near the Outer Banks in December 2014 while on an eight month trip from Plattsburgh, New York to south Florida.

The 2022 book, Riverman by Ben McGrath was written about Conant and his final journey. It is believed that some of Conant's trips also inspired fellow canoeist Neal Moore.

Conant was a Navy veteran (1983–1989) and one of nine children. As a child he spent time in Germany and Pearl River, New York. His boating journey began in Idaho in 1999 when he canoed the Yellowstone River and he became known for his long journeys.

== See also ==
- List of people who disappeared mysteriously at sea
