= Adam Lovell =

American businessman (born 1977)

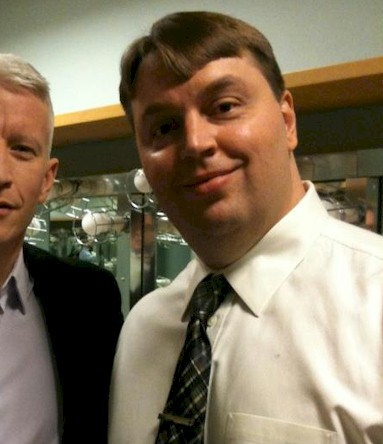
- Occupation: Founder WriteAPrisoner.com
- Years active: 2000–present

Adam Lovell (born September 25, 1977) is the founder of WriteAPrisoner.com. He has been featured on 20/20, Fox News, E! True Hollywood Story, CNN, and many other media outlets. Lovell is an advocate for inmates' rights and families of prisoners. The entrepreneur emphasizes reducing recidivism through letter writing and regularly works with various states' Department of Corrections toward this goal. He has expanded the site beyond letter-writing to include self-help guides for inmates to improve their lives and sometimes writes articles offering suggestions for ex-offenders looking for work. Lovell told BuzzFeed, "We have 1% of the incarcerated population [nationally] actually using the site.” He is the author of WriteAPrisoner.com's SELF-HELP GUIDE FOR INMATES: Flourishing Through Adversity.

== Personal life and background ==
Lovell was born in Pennsylvania in 1977. He has resided in Florida since 1986. He is the son of educator and writer Cindy Lovell. Lovell is a former ocean lifeguard and emergency medical technician with the Volusia County Beach Patrol. His work with inmates inspired GoDaddy owner Bob Parsons to interview Lovell for GoDaddy Radio's first anniversary show, citing the widespread influence WriteAPrisoner.com has had with inmates and their families. His work has been reported in a wide range of media sources. Because of its unique access to inmates, his website is often utilized by media when discussing a broad spectrum of justice system stories. For example, Business Insider launched its legal section using stories garnered through WriteAPrisoner.com.

== Publications and recognition ==
Lovell maintains a blog on WriteAPrisoner.com to personally address specific topics. His launching of WriteAPrisoner.com was described in the Mensa International Research Journal as an example of giftedness in the workplace for his unique approach to reducing recidivism in the United States.
