= Cindy Lovell =

American educator and writer

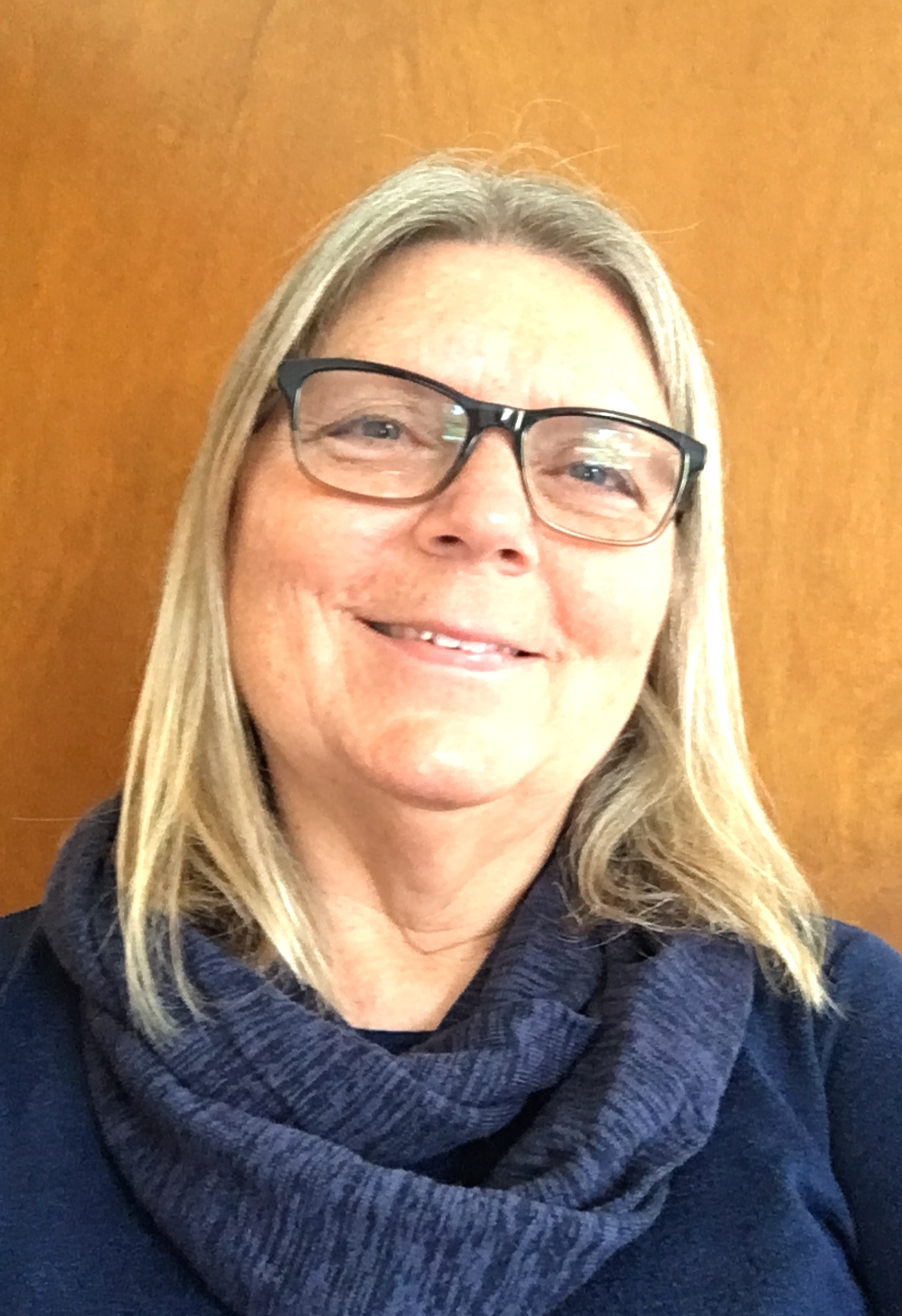
- Born: Cindy Louise Pletcher; May 6, 1956 (age 70); Altoona, Pennsylvania, U.S.
- Education: Stetson University (BA, MA) and The University of Iowa (Ph.D.)
- Occupations: Educator, Writer
- Employer: Epic Flight Academy
- Known for: Education, Writing, Mark Twain
- Notable work: Mark Twain: Words & Music, Orthophonic Joy: The 1927 Bristol Sessions Revisited
- Awards: 2010 Hannibal NAACP Martin Luther King, Jr. Award, 2011 Hannibal Area Chamber of Commerce Civic Contributor Award, 2012 Missouri Governor's Tourism Ambassador Award, 2012 Hannibal Area Chamber of Commerce Community Betterment Award, 2013 Awarded Key to the City of Hannibal, 2021 and 2023 University of South Florida College of Education Excellence in Undergraduate Education Award, 2024 University of Missouri Trulaske College of Business John A. Riggs, Jr. Excellence in MBA Teaching Award
- Website: drcindylovell.com

Cindy Lovell (born 1956) is an American educator and writer.

== Life ==
Cindy Lovell was born in Altoona, Pennsylvania. She graduated from Stetson University with a BA and MA in elementary education and from the University of Iowa with a Ph.D. in education. She has two children, Angela Lovell and Adam Lovell. She is known for her work in support of Mark Twain's legacy.

== Career ==
Lovell has taught elementary school and has held tenured positions at Stetson University and Quincy University. She is the only person to have served as executive director for both the Mark Twain Boyhood Home & Museum in Hannibal, Missouri and the Mark Twain House and Museum in Hartford, Connecticut. In Hannibal, Lovell oversaw the restoration of the Becky Thatcher House, established the quadrennial Clemens Conference, and facilitated numerous other projects. In Hartford, she oversaw the restoration of the famed mahogany suite guest quarters in the Clemens home, established the Mark Twain American Voice in Literature Award with trustee and author David Baldacci, and promoted the Mark Twain Commemorative Coin Act sales, which she worked to have enacted into law during her time in Hannibal. Currently, Lovell is the director of education at Epic Flight Academy in New Smyrna Beach, Florida. She is an adjunct professor teaching education courses for the University of South Florida and a Mark Twain course for Quincy University. Additionally, Lovell is an adjunct professor in the Trulaske College of Business at the University of Missouri. Lovell also served as director for the City of Hannibal’s bicentennial year in 2019 and is a member of the steering committee for the American Writers Museum.

== Projects ==
Lovell wrote the narrative tracks and served as co-executive producer with Carl Jackson of Mark Twain: Words & Music, a double-album benefit for the Mark Twain Boyhood Home & Museum. Her narratives were performed by Jimmy Buffett, Clint Eastwood, Garrison Keillor, and Angela Lovell. Brad Paisley, Emmylou Harris, and others recorded the musical tracks. She also wrote the narrative tracks for Orthophonic Joy: The 1927 Bristol Sessions Revisited, another double-album project with Jackson, which was a benefit for the Birthplace of Country Music Museum in Bristol, Tennessee. Lovell's narrative tracks were performed by Eddie Stubbs. Singers on the project included Dolly Parton, Keb' Mo', Marty Stuart, and others.

Lovell has been a contributor to HuffPost and other publications, such as Mensa Research Journal and Florida Reading Quarterly. She contributed chapters to Reading in 2010: A Comprehensive Review of a Changing Field, Mark Twain and Youth: Studies in His Life and Writings, and Critical Insights: The Adventures of Tom Sawyer. She is a co-editor and author of Preparing the Way: Teaching ELs in the PreK-12 Classroom. She also co-authored Linguistics for K-12 Classroom Application and The Big Book of ESOL Activities: Preparation for Educators, Administrators, and School Counselors with Jane Govoni. Lovell has also authored two children's novel, Rachel Mason Hears the Sound and Not This Sunday. She co-authored Down the Mississippi with CNN iReporter Neal Moore.

Lovell wrote the foreword for Mark Twain's Hartford and Hannibal: Bluff City Memories, 1819–2019. She also wrote the afterword for 101 Trailblazing Women of Air and Space.

Lovell has lectured widely on the subject of Mark Twain at a number of venues such as Oxford University, Kensal Rise Library, and the National Steinbeck Center. She is an annual speaker on the American Queen steamboat's Mark Twain cruise and has lectured at numerous educational conferences and symposia.

== Media ==
Lovell appeared in Holbrook/Twain: An American Odyssey, a documentary about Hal Holbrook's career performing as Mark Twain, directed by Scott Teems and Interpreting Twain, a documentary short directed by Paul Cotter. Interviews with Lovell have appeared on C-SPAN and CNN and in The New York Times, The New Yorker, Smithsonian Magazine, and other publications. Journalist Bob Edwards interviewed Lovell for his show on SiriusXM. Jim Trelease interviewed Lovell for The Read-Aloud Handbook.

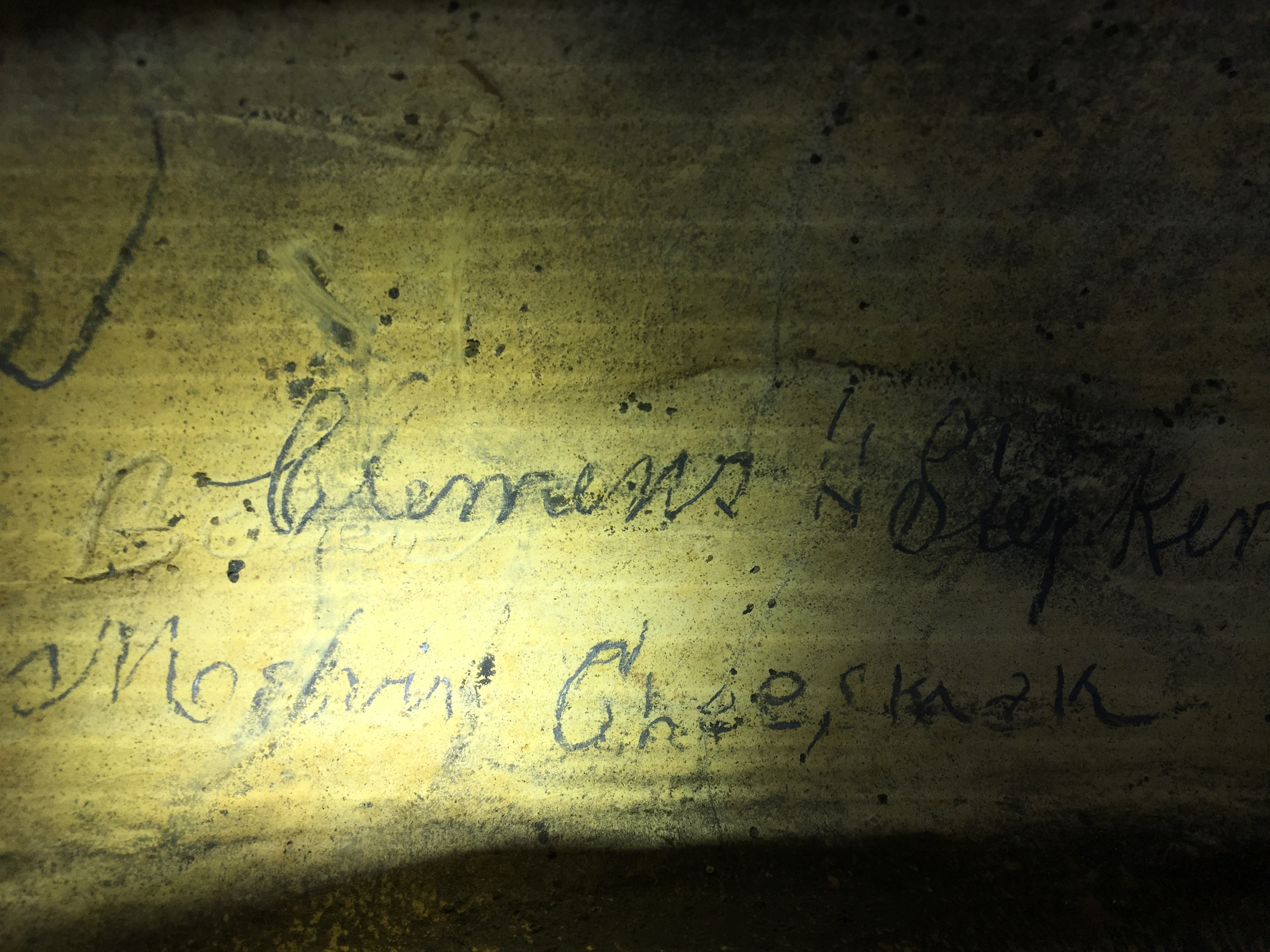
First photo of Sam Clemens's cave signature

== Discovery of Clemens' signature in Mark Twain Cave ==
Lovell made news around the world when she discovered the long-sought boyhood signature of Samuel Langhorne Clemens on July 26, 2019 inside the Mark Twain Cave in Hannibal, Missouri, where Clemens lived from the age of 4 to 17. She had looked for the signature for decades and discovered it during a special tour with fellow Twain scholars during the quadrennial Clemens Conference hosted by the Mark Twain Boyhood Home & Museum. Lovell and cave owner Linda Coleberd did not announce the discovery until experts had the opportunity to examine it. The signature was authenticated as belonging to Samuel Clemens by Twain scholars Alan Gribben and Kevin Mac Donnell after comparing signatures of Sam Clemens and his siblings from the time period the Clemens family lived in Hannibal.

Lovell's first significant Twain discovery came during a visit to the Bermuda National Trust when she found an unsigned manuscript detailing the first time Clemens witnessed a cricket match tucked inside a scrapbook. The essay had been published in The Strand after Twain's death, but the whereabouts of the original manuscript were unknown. The manuscript was later exhibited at Masterworks Museum of Bermuda Art.
