= Cyber-dissident =

Person who voices political dissent on the Internet

A cyber-dissident is a professional journalist, an activist or citizen journalist who posts news, information, or commentary on the internet that implies criticism of a government or regime.

At least two nonprofit organizations are currently working to raise awareness of the contributions of cyber-dissidents and to defend them against the human rights violations to which some of them are subjected: Global Voices Online and Reporters Without Borders. The latter has released a Handbook For Bloggers and Cyber-Dissidents and maintains a roster of currently imprisoned cyber-dissidents.

In regions where print and broadcast media are tightly controlled, anonymous online postings by cyber-dissidents may be the only source of information about the experiences, feelings, and opinions of ordinary citizens. This advantage may be offset by the difficulty in assessing the good faith and accuracy of reports originating from anonymous sources.

Recently, social-media tools have been widely credited with igniting pervasive social upheavals, some of which have even brought down governments.

== Persecution ==
=== Gabon ===
In 1998 Dr. Daniel Mengara, a Gabonese scholar and activist living New Jersey, created a website called Bongo Doit Partir (Bongo Must Go) to encourage a revolution against the regime of Omar Bongo in Gabon. In July 2003, Amnesty International reported the arrest of five Gabonese known to be members of Bongo Doit Partir. The members were detained for three months.

=== China ===
In 2003, Cai Lujun was imprisoned for posting a series of articles online under the pen name "盼民主" ("expecting for democracy") criticizing the Chinese government.

=== Egypt ===
In 2006, several bloggers in Egypt were arrested for allegedly defaming the president Hosni Mubarak and expressing critical views about Islam

=== Iran ===
In 2005, Mohamad Reza Nasab Abdolahi was imprisoned for publishing an open letter to Ayatollah Ali Khamenei; Mohamad's pregnant wife and other bloggers who commented on Mohamad's treatment were also imprisoned.

=== Palestine ===
In October 2019, a Palestinian court blocked access to 59 websites that were identified as critical of the Palestinian Authority. According to the ruling, these websites published material that "threaten national security and civil peace".

=== Russia ===
When Russian president Vladimir Putin in 2006 called on his nation's women to have more children, journalist Vladimir Rakhmankov published a satiric article on the Internet calling Putin "the nation's phallic symbol". Rakhmankov was found guilty of offending Vladimir Putin, and fined by the court of the region he lived in to the sum equal of US$680. The overall story served as a good adversiting for Rakhmanov's article, that was republished by numerous Russian sources afterwards.

Three Russian bloggers has supposed in 2003, that Russian state security service FSB, the main successor to the KGB, created special teams of people who appear on various blogs to harass and intimidate political bloggers and thus effectively prevent free discussion of undesirable subjects. They referred to such tactics are known as "active measures". A Russian critic of this theory has noted, in 2003, that security services have more important tasks than flooding in forums.

== See also ==
- Citizen journalism
- Internet activism
- Reporters Without Borders
