= Cai Lujun =

Chinese dissident writer (born 1968)

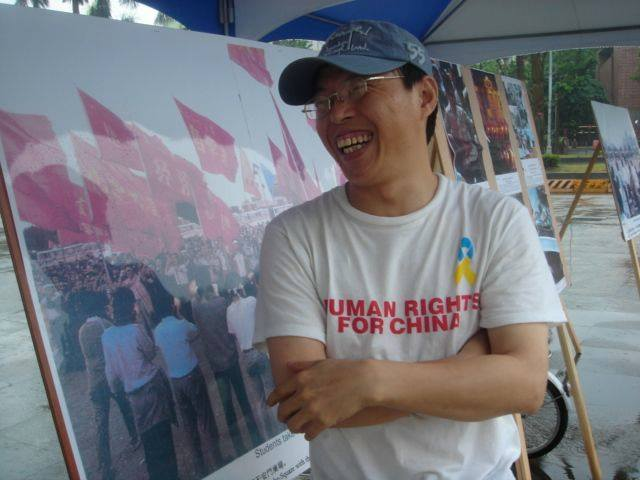
- Cai Lujun in 2009
- Born: July 16, 1968 (age 57) Feixiang County, Hebei Province, China
- Occupation: Dissident writer

Cai Lujun (simplified Chinese: 蔡陆军; traditional Chinese: 蔡陸軍; pinyin: Cài Lùjūn; born July 16, 1968) is a Chinese dissident writer.

== Biography ==
Cai Lujun was born in Feixiang County, Hebei Province. He was an owner of a foreign trading company and a freelance writer. He graduated from secondary school.

Cai was one of the first persons in China to be arrested for posting articles on the internet.

He was accused of posting a series of articles online under the pen name "盼民主 (Pan Minzhu)" ("expecting for democracy") criticizing the Chinese government. Cai was put under house arrest on February 22, 2003. He was found guilty of "incitement to subversion" and sentenced to three years in prison by Shijiazhuang Intermediate People's Court on 30 October 2003.

In 2006 he was released from prison. He now lives in exile in Taiwan since 2007.

== See also ==
- Cyber-dissident
- International Freedom of Expression Exchange
- Internet

== Sources ==
- Independent Chinese pen writers, writers in prison.
- Cai Lujun, Imprisoned for Posting Internet Articles, Released at End of Sentence
- Chinese Cyberdissident Cai Lujun on Freedom (CNNiReport)
- original court judgment
