= Mark Twain Boyhood Home & Museum =

Historic house in Missouri, United States

- Mark Twain Boyhood Home
- U.S. National Register of Historic Places
- U.S. National Historic Landmark
- U.S. Historic district – Contributing property
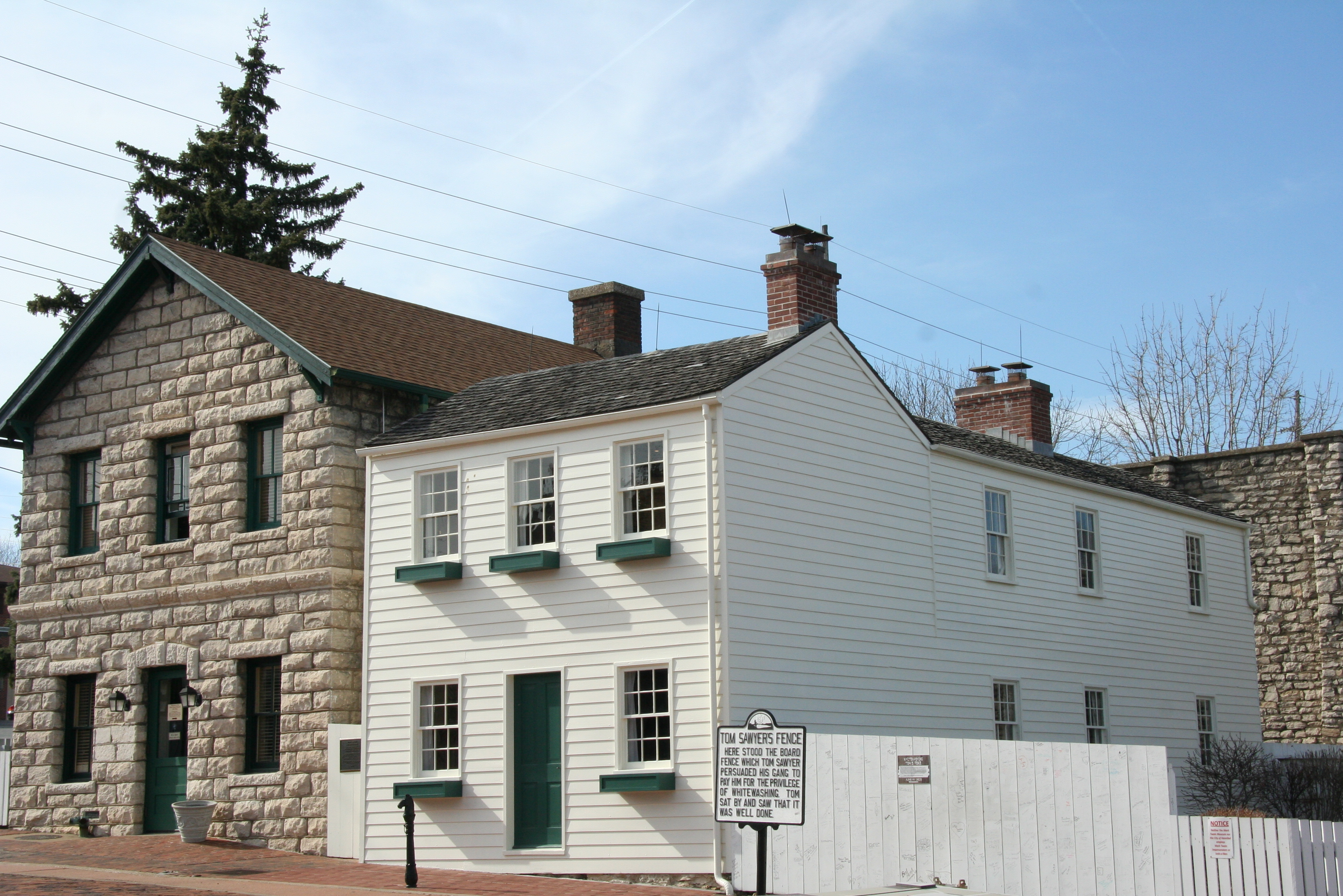
- The museum in 2011

- Location within Missouri Location within the United States
- Interactive map showing the location of Mark Twain Boyhood Hone
- Location: 206–208 Hill Street, Hannibal, Missouri, United States
- Coordinates: 39°42′43″N 91°21′28″W
- Area: less than one acre
- Built: 1844
- NRHP reference No.: 66000419

Significant dates
- Added to NRHP: October 15, 1966
- Designated NHL: December 29, 1962

The Mark Twain Boyhood Home & Museum is located on 206-208 Hill Street, Hannibal, Missouri, on the west bank of the Mississippi River in the United States. It was the home of Samuel Langhorne Clemens, better known as author Mark Twain, from 1844 to 1853. Clemens found the inspiration for many of his stories, including the white picket fence, while living here. It has been open to the public as a museum since 1912, and was designated a National Historic Landmark on December 29, 1962. It is located in the Mark Twain Historic District.

== Buildings ==
The Boyhood Home is one of nine properties that comprise the present Mark Twain Boyhood Home & Museum complex. The legendary whitewashed fence of Tom Sawyer borders the property. There are seven additional museum buildings as part of the complex - the Interpretive Center, Becky Thatcher House, Huck Finn House, J.M Clemens Justice of the Peace Office, Grant's Drug Store, the stone Works Progress Administration (WPA) building that houses a gift shop, and the Museum Gallery, located at 120 N. Main St. The museum has acquired the "Becky Thatcher" house, home of Clemens' childhood sweetheart, Laura Hawkins. Its exterior was renovated and restored in 2010; while the interior re-opened in 2016.

During the summer of 2006, the museum completed work on a replica of the "Huck Finn" house, being the home of Tom Blankenship, the boy upon whom Twain based the character of Huckleberry Finn. Exhibits in the Huck Finn House delve into Hannibal's history with slavery.

The museum also owns and maintains the Tom and Huck Statue at the foot of Cardiff Hill. Erected in 1926, it is one of the earliest known statues erected to honor fictional characters. Other highlights of the museum properties include the Boyhood Home garden area, bordered by a high stone wall built by the WPA. The close proximity of the Mississippi River, the Mark Twain Cave, and other settings found in Twain's novel lure thousands of visitors to the museum each year.

== Collections ==
The museum's collection includes many first editions by Mark Twain, numerous personal items (including his Oxford gown), the only known surviving white suit coat, and a vast array of Twain memorabilia, such as the death mask of his baby son Langdon, and a jewelry box Twain had hand-carved in Italy to his specifications as a gift to his wife, Olivia. There are many interactive exhibits including a replica stagecoach and river raft. These serve to highlight specific books by Twain: The Adventures of Tom Sawyer, Adventures of Huckleberry Finn, The Innocents Abroad, Roughing It, and A Connecticut Yankee in King Arthur's Court. Visitors can even sound a real steamboat whistle as they look out upon the Mississippi River. The museum also houses the second largest collection of original Norman Rockwell paintings. These paintings were commissioned as illustrations for a special edition of The Adventures of Tom Sawyer and Adventures of Huckleberry Finn. The museum also hosts regional art and touring exhibits.

== Events ==
The museum sponsors many events throughout the year including children's events. Their educational outreach programs include teacher workshops, young author workshops, writers workshops, scholarly conferences, and a creative teaching award. On May 15, 2012, to commemorate the 100th anniversary of the museum, a spokesperson announced the establishment of the "Mark Twain Lifetime Achievement Award" with Hal Holbrook named as the first recipient.

In 2011 the museum released Mark Twain: Words & Music, a double-CD benefit telling Twain's life in spoken word and song. The project was produced by Grammy award-winner Carl Jackson and released on Mailboat Records. It features Jimmy Buffett as Huckleberry Finn, Garrison Keillor as narrator, Clint Eastwood as Mark Twain, and Angela Lovell as Susy Clemens. Singers include Emmylou Harris, Doyle Lawson & Quicksilver, Rhonda Vincent, Bradley Walker, Carl Jackson, The Church Sisters, Sheryl Crow, Brad Paisley, Marty Raybon, Val Storey, Vince Gill, Joe Diffie, and Ricky Skaggs. Cindy Lovell, the executive director of the museum at that time, wrote the narrative, and several new songs were written for the project.

In the summer, the museum is the destination of thousands of visitors. The town of Hannibal celebrates National Tom Sawyer Days over the 4th of July each year complete with whitewashing and frog jumping contests. The boyhood home is a focal point in these events.

== See also ==
- Life on the Mississippi
- List of Missouri state park and historic sites
- Mark Twain Birthplace State Historic Site
- Mark Twain House in Hartford, Connecticut
- Stormfield, Twain's last home
- Mark Twain Cave
- Mark Twain State Park
- Paddle steamer
- Riverboat
- Steamboat
- Steamboats of the Mississippi
