= Rascals and Robbers: The Secret Adventures of Tom Sawyer and Huckleberry Finn =

1982 American TV movie

- Genre: Adventure; Family
- Based on: Characters created by Mark Twain
- Written by: Carlos Davis; David Taylor
- Directed by: Dick Lowry
- Starring: Patrick Creadon; Anthony Michael Hall; Cynthia Nixon; Anthony Zerbe; Ed Begley Jr. Anthony James; Allyn Ann McLerie
- Theme music composer: James Horner
- Country of origin: United States
- Original language: English

Production
- Producers: Carlos Davis; David Taylor
- Cinematography: James Pergola
- Editor: Byron "Buzz" Brandt
- Running time: 95 minutes
- Production company: CBS Entertainment

Original release
- Network: CBS
- Release: February 27, 1982

Rascals and Robbers: The Secret Adventures of Tom Sawyer and Huckleberry Finn is a 1982 American made-for-television adventure film originally broadcast February 27, 1982 on CBS as the TV Movie of the Week. CBS financed the film with a $2.2 million budget and the working title was The Further Adventures of Tom Sawyer and Huckleberry Finn. The film was shot on location in Natchez, Mississippi in the fall of 1981 where the filmmakers added dirt to the street of the historic town. The movie features early roles for Cynthia Nixon and Anthony Michael Hall (co-starring as Huck). It was the first major role for then-child actor and future award-winning filmmaker Patrick Creadon, who starred as Tom. The teleplay was written by Carlos Davis and David Taylor. It was directed by Dick Lowry and produced by his brother Hunt Lowry.

== Production and locations ==
Filming began in late September 1981 in a wooded area near Natchez, Miss. and the first scene to be shot involved Tom and Huck escaping on horseback from the villain. The climactic cave sequences were filmed in DeSoto Caverns near Childersburg, Ala.

== Plot and context ==
The movie is set shortly after the ending of Mark Twain's 1876 novel The Adventures of Tom Sawyer as St. Petersburg prepares for its 50th anniversary. Although billed as a sequel, the teleplay includes several elements of Twain's The Adventures of Tom Sawyer and his 1884 novel The Adventures of Huckleberry Finn: Huckleberry bristling at the Widow Douglas' attempts to civilize him; Tom being caught by Aunt Polly while eating stolen jam; scary encounters in a graveyard; Tom and Huck's mysterious disappearance alarming the town; Tom eagerly puffing on Huck's corncob pipe and getting sick; a scary journey through perilous caverns; an elaborate scheme to save a slave, etc.

The story opens as adventure-craving Tom hunts down Huck, whom he finds smoking his corncob pipe in a pickle barrel. Huck is tired of the Widow Douglas trying to civilize him and Tom wants to avoid participating in the town's lavish 50th anniversary celebration. Tom suggests he and Huck run off to live among the Indians. But the boys are distracted by the arrival in town of the suspicious-looking Scree (Anthony James); Tom suspects Scree is a spy, and he and Huck follow Scree to learn his plans. Tom and Huck overhear con artists planning to bilk the citizens of St. Petersburg into spending $15,000 for a bogus set of jewel-encrusted golden angel statues to be used in the celebration. Fearing for their lives, the boys flee town, followed closely by Scree, who turns out to be the sinister leader of the villains. Huck and Tom rush to the river but are temporarily separated when the raft on which they are making their escape splits in half. Huck hides out with a would-be cardsharp (Ed Begley Jr.) and Tom falls into Scree's clutches. Reunited, Tom and Huck get mixed up in a crooked poker game that ends disastrously and narrowly escape on horseback from the malicious Scree, who is determined to do away with them. When Tom complains of hunger pangs, Huck suggests they have a smoke to take their minds off food, and he offers Tom his corncob pipe. Intrigued, Tom smokes the pipe and quickly becomes queasy. Tom and Huck's fortunes improve when they fall in with a ragtag traveling circus, run by the kind but boozy Arco the Magnificent (Anthony Zerbe), who is happy to supply the duo with a meal in exchange for some help with his rather shoddy show. Tom and Huck also compete for the affections of Arco's lovely and strong-willed daughter, Alice (Nixon). When Huck nearly tumbles to his death while performing a dangerous stunt to impress Alice, he is rescued by George (J.D. Hall), a freed slave who's looking for his enslaved sister, Reba. The boys enlist George, Arco and Alice in an elaborate masquerade to save Reba from Colonel Beeton (Hansford Rowe) and his loathsome, wealthy family. George dresses up as an African king, with Tom and Huck pretending to be his minions. Dazzled by the idea of entertaining royalty, Beeton invites them to his plantation and serves a banquet. But Beeton's servant recognizes the disguised George and everyone must make a hasty exit from the Beeton estate, taking Reba along. The gun-toting Scree resurfaces and threatens Tom, Huck, George, Reba, Arco and Alice while they're on the road. Tom leads his friends into MacDougall Cave, where they must creep through a cavern swarming with snakes. In the end, Tom and Huck expose Scree's scheme, bring the villains to justice — the supposedly precious statues turn out to be nothing but worthless rocks — and save the day. But at the celebratory dinner honoring them, Tom catches a glimpse of what looks like a pirate wandering around outside the window and he and Huck sneak out of the party, looking for a new escapade.

== Cast ==
- Patrick Creadon as Tom Sawyer
- Anthony Michael Hall as Huckleberry "Huck" Finn
- Anthony James as Scree
- Allyn Ann McLerie as Aunt Polly
- Ed Begley Jr. as Jeb
- Cynthia Nixon as Alice
- John Harkins as Mr. Clinch
- Hansford Rowe as Colonel Beeton
- Anthony Zerbe as Arco "The Magnificent"
- J.D. Hall as George
- Eugenia Wright as Reba

== Reception ==
Rascals and Robbers did not fare well in the Nielsen ratings, coming in 57th out of 64 shows the week it was broadcast. CBS re-broadcast the film on November 26, 1982 during the Thanksgiving weekend. The film was nominated for three Primetime Emmy Awards in 1982 in the categories of editing, sound and art direction. Film Score Monthly noted it is "best remembered today for its highly enjoyable score by a young James Horner, completed mere days before he began work on his breakout success, 'Star Trek II: The Wrath of Khan'." Leonard Maltin gave the film an "Average" rating in Leonard Maltin's Movie and Video Guide. Gannett News Service TV critic Bill Hayden said, "Wholesome, diverting and entertaining describe this production. ... What it lacks in substance, it makes up for in pace, moving along fast enough to keep its young audience interested and grownups from becoming bored." Sky Cinema said the film "looks good but lacks much of the flavour and bite of the original. All but the most undemanding of children are likely to get restless somewhere along the route of this rambling narrative which provides our heroes with adventures among slaves, con-men, outlaws and a circus." In "American Literature on Stage and Screen: 525 Works and Their Adaptations," Thomas S. Hischak calls the film "a highly entertaining kids' movie but not a true Twain work." Associated Press critic Fred Rothenberg deemed it "a ripoff, and a miserable one at that. ... so boring, it gives running away from home a bad name." John J. O'Connor of The New York Times News Service noted, "Tom and Huck (Patrick Creadon and Anthony Michael Hall respectively) are, of course, the rascals, refusing to go to choir practice and sneaking smokes in empty pickle barrels. ... By the time the boys emerge victorious back home ("Ain't it grand to be heroes," beams Tom), the action has flagged considerably in a number of spots, but the production, filmed in Natchez, Miss., continues to look good throughout. The young'uns might appreciate several of the less obvious plot contrivances."

== Video release ==
According to The Palm Beach Post, the film was released on VHS by Playhouse Video in 1987. It has never officially been issued on DVD or Blu-ray.
