= Tom Sawyer (2000 film) =

- VHS cover
- Directed by: Paul Sabella; Phil Mendez
- Written by: Patricia Jones; Donald Reiker; Jymn Magon
- Based on: The Adventures of Tom Sawyer by Mark Twain
- Produced by: Paul Sabella; Jonathan Dern; Patricia Jones; Donald Reiker; Cary Silver
- Starring: Rhett Akins; Charlie Daniels; Alecia Elliott; Waylon Jennings; Richard Kind; Don Knotts; Mark Nesler; Marty Stuart; Betty White; Hank Williams Jr.; Mark Wills; Lee Ann Womack
- Music by: Mark Watters
- Production company: Metro-Goldwyn-Mayer Animation
- Distributed by: MGM Home Entertainment (Note: Released under MGM Family Entertainment imprint)
- Release date: April 4, 2000
- Running time: 89 minutes
- Country: United States
- Language: English

Tom Sawyer is a 2000 American animated musical adventure film directed by Paul Sabella and Phil Mendez. It is an adaptation of Mark Twain's 1876 novel The Adventures of Tom Sawyer, with a cast of anthropomorphic animals. Most of the characters' voices are performed by country music singers.

Released direct-to-video by MGM Home Entertainment on April 4, 2000, the film was produced by MGM Animation. This is the only MGM Animation production not to be available exclusively through Warner Home Video worldwide, and is also the final MGM Animation film before the studio's closure in 2002.

Critical reviews were mixed, with some praise for the voice actors alongside disapproval for deviations from the source material.

== Plot ==
Tom Sawyer and his half-brother Sid are on their way to school when they see Huckleberry Finn fishing. Tom skips school to join Huck, but changes his mind after he sees Becky Thatcher. He tries to sneak into class, but Sid snitches on him to the teacher, Mr. Dobbins. Tom is made to sit with the girls, which he actually likes since he's able to sit next to Becky. He is also sat beside Amy Lawrence, a friend to whom he became "engaged". She still has romantic feelings for him, but he is too enchanted by Becky to notice. Tom's pet frog Rebel then disrupts the class, meaning they are given early dismissals.

On the way home from school, during the musical number "Hook, Line and Sinker", Tom tries multiple times to steal a kiss from Becky, but is thwarted each time by her father, Judge Thatcher. The next day, Tom is about to go fishing with his friends. However, he was forced to paint the house by Aunt Polly as punishment for what happened at school. Tom, however, gets his friends to paint the house for him instead. While everyone is still painting, Becky stops by and Tom offers her to paint along with everyone else, but under one condition; she needs to kiss him. As Tom prepares for the kiss, he gets kissed by Rebel as a prank, making everyone laugh at him.

That night, when Tom and Huck go treasure hunting, they find Injurin' Joe and his sidekick Mutt Potter uncovering a chest of gold. Deputy Bean, who is visiting his wife's grave, discovers Joe and Mutt. As the boys watch from behind a tombstone, Joe brutally murders Bean who tried to hit him with a shovel, frames Mutt and captures Rebel. Tom knows that Joe can track him down through Rebel, so he and Huck make a pact never to tell anyone what they have seen.

The next day, at school Becky accidentally spills ink on the test results. Amy is so happy because she wants to tell on Becky, but Tom takes the blame, for which he receives a brutal spanking with a ruler by Mr. Dobbins. After school, Tom becomes "engaged" to Becky, before a musical number by Becky and Amy, "One Dream", where the two individually express their shared love for Tom. He then admits he did the same with Amy, causing Becky to break off the engagement and then walks away. Tom and Huck visit Mutt, who is on death row. They try to get him to remember Injurin' Joe murdering Bean, but Mutt doesn't remember. Joe meanwhile finds Tom and Huck, but they escape on a raft. They celebrate their survival and friendship with a musical number, "Friends for Life".

When Tom and Huck swims back to town, they learn that the townspeople are mourning their deaths, believing the boys to have drowned. They disrupt the service, showing up at their own funeral, and are welcomed back. Amy, wanting to make Becky more upset at Tom, kisses Tom in front of Becky making her believe that Tom has chosen Amy over her and leaves before Tom can get a chance to explain, leaving him heartbroken. Judge Thatcher sentences Mutt to be hanged, but Huck and Tom testify against Joe at the last minute. Joe goes after Tom and Huck but fails and is pulled away by a river. Mutt was finally freed and his criminal charges were dropped, and the boys are hailed as heroes.

During the celebration, after making up with Tom, Becky talks Tom into exploring a cave. Amy follows them. Tom and Becky go into a cave and Tom says to Becky that she is the prettiest girl who he ever seen. That made Amy very sad and she stopped to follow Tom and Becky. They get lost and Becky begins to lose hope to finding the exit. Tom sings a number, "Light at the End of the Tunnel" to try and reassure her that they will find a way out. Instead of finding an exit, they find treasure - and Joe. Meanwhile, the townspeople notice Tom and Becky missing and Amy, who saw Tom and Becky go into the cave, reveals where they are. The townspeople go to look for them in the cave. With Huck's help, Tom subdues Joe, causing a rockfall which kills Joe, and is reunited with the townspeople and Aunt Polly.

In the end Amy becomes Huck's girlfriend (after being impressed with how he assisted Tom against Joe) and Becky finally becomes Tom's girlfriend. Amy is no longer jealous of Becky and got over her feelings of Tom. The next day, Sid again tries to snitch on Tom, but it backfires, as Aunt Polly makes Sid paint the house instead of Tom. The movie ends with Tom, Becky, Huck and Amy having a picnic, during which Tom shows the others a gold coin and tells them about another treasure hunt.

== Cast ==
- Rhett Akins as Tom Sawyer
- Mark Wills as Huckleberry Finn
- Hynden Walch as Becky Thatcher
  - Lee Ann Womack as Becky Thatcher's singing voice
- Clea Lewis as Amy Lawrence
  - Alecia Elliott as Amy Lawrence's singing voice
- Betty White as Aunt Polly
- Dean Haglund as Sid
- Richard Kind as Mr. Dobbins
- Hank Williams Jr. as Injurin' Joe
- Don Knotts as Mutt Potter
- Waylon Jennings as Judge Thatcher
- Dee Bradley Baker as Rebel the Frog
- Pat Corley as Sheriff McGee
- Marty Stuart as Reverend
- Thom Adcox as Deputy Bean
- Sheryl Bernstein
- Jennifer Hale
- David Kaufman

== Character comparisons to original ==
Character in the book	Character in the movie	Species	Other characteristics
Thomas "Tom" Sawyer	Same	Tabby cat	Has reddish-brownish hair; wears blue overalls and a white shirt.
Huckleberry "Huck" Finn	Same	Fox	Wears green overalls and has white hair. Also has a straw hat.
Rebecca "Becky" Thatcher	Same	Russian blue cat	Has short platinum blonde hair. Wears a pink dress and carries a pink parasol with her.
Judge Edward Thatcher	Same	Russian blue cat	Wears a suit and cowboy hat.
Amy Lawrence	Same	Persian cat	Has orangeish hair tied in two braided pigtails and light blue hairbows. Wears green overalls and a white shirt. She is barefoot throughout the film.
Sidney "Sid" Sawyer	Same	Persian cat	Has black hair and wears a light blue shirt with a purple bowtie, dark blue overalls and glasses. He is considered to be a snitch.
Mr. Reginald Dobbins	Same	Turkey	Black Toupee; has spats on his feet, a purple suit, a red bowtie and wears glasses.
Injun Joe	Injurin' Joe	Grizzly bear	Wears blue jeans and a brown vest. Also wears a cowboy hat and a necklace.
Muff Potter	Mutt Potter	Bloodhound	Wears green shirt and brown pants
Polly Sawyer	Same	Tabby cat	Has grey hair. Wears pink dress with a white smock and glasses.
Dr. Robinson	Deputy Bean	Bloodhound	Wears a blueish shirt, blueish hat and deputy's badge.

== Soundtrack ==
- "Leave Your Love Light On" - Marty Stuart
- "Can't Keep a Country Boy Down" - Charlie Daniels
- "Hook, Line, and Sinker" - Mark Nesler
- "Houseboat Painting Song"
- "One Dream" - Lee Ann Womack/Alecia Elliott
- "Friends for Life" - Rhett Akins/Mark Wills
- "Light at the End of the Tunnel"/Reprise - Bryan White/Rebecca Lynn Howard/Rhett Akins/Lee Ann Womack
- "Never, Ever, and Forever" - Lee Ann Womack/Mark Wills
- "Injurin' Joe" - Ray Stevens

== Production ==
Tom Sawyer was announced to be in development since March 1998. In June 1998, MGM Animation made a deal with Stone Canyon Investments to fund three animated films over the course of four years, starting with Tom Sawyer.

The film was produced by MGM Animation, who were also responsible for All Dogs Go to Heaven 2, Babes in Toyland, and An All Dogs Christmas Carol. With animation done by Wang Film Productions in Taiwan. The film was originally going to be given a theatrical release, but was later given a direct-to-video release instead.

Betty White admitted to enjoying playing a character who was both "barrel-chested" and an animal character, explaining that "I'm closer to animals than I am to anything else," and also liked playing a "barrel-chested" woman. When asked how she got cast in a film mostly starring country stars, she answered, "I have no idea where I came into the act."

== Release ==
Tom Sawyer premiered on The Nashville Network on March 27, 2000 and repeated on the channel on April 1. TNN had planned a different program to air the same time and day as Tom Sawyer's repeat airing, that being the live presentation of that year's annual NASCAR Albertsons 300 race; however, due to rainy weather causing a delay, the sports division of TNN owner CBS chose to not have the channel air the event. Thus, Tom Sawyer was aired instead. MGM released Tom Sawyer on DVD and VHS on April 4, its soundtrack issued by MCA Records the same day. The DVD comes with a featurette about the production of the film. MGM later re-released the DVD in the United States on July 30, 2002, the United Kingdom on March 14, 2005, and issued a three-film DVD set on March 5, 2007 that included Tom Sawyer, The Secret of NIMH (1982), and its sequel.

== Critical reception ==
The film received generally mixed reviews.

Harlene Ellin of The Chicago Tribune gave a negative review, saying that it "stray[ed] too far from Twain." An uncredited review in the Wichita Eagle was also unfavorable, calling it a "shallow" interpretation of Twain's work.

The New York Daily News strongly praised Tom Sawyer for its "fairly cute" animal characters; "crisp and colorful" animation; voice acting, particularly from Don Knotts; and the musical numbers. However, he found the portrayals of Tom and Becky a "little bland" and the song "Friends for Life" "incongruous, as though it had been tacked on for length." AllMovie ranked the film 2 stars out of a possible 5, while The Star-Ledger spotlighted its "pronounced country flavor" songs as well as "attractive extras."

Variety, in addition to noting the "energetic numbers," highlighted the film's dark content for a children's product, such as the murder sequence and the stakes of a dog character possibly being executed; but dismissed the visual gags and its more sentimental musical numbers as uninspired.

Bruce Westbrook of The Houston Chronicle said it was a good introduction of the source material for children with an entertaining score some fun scenes, but he called the animation "weak" even by direct-to-video standards, and suggested even children might object to the sanitized interpretations of Twain's original story.
