= Tom Sawyer (1956 musical) =

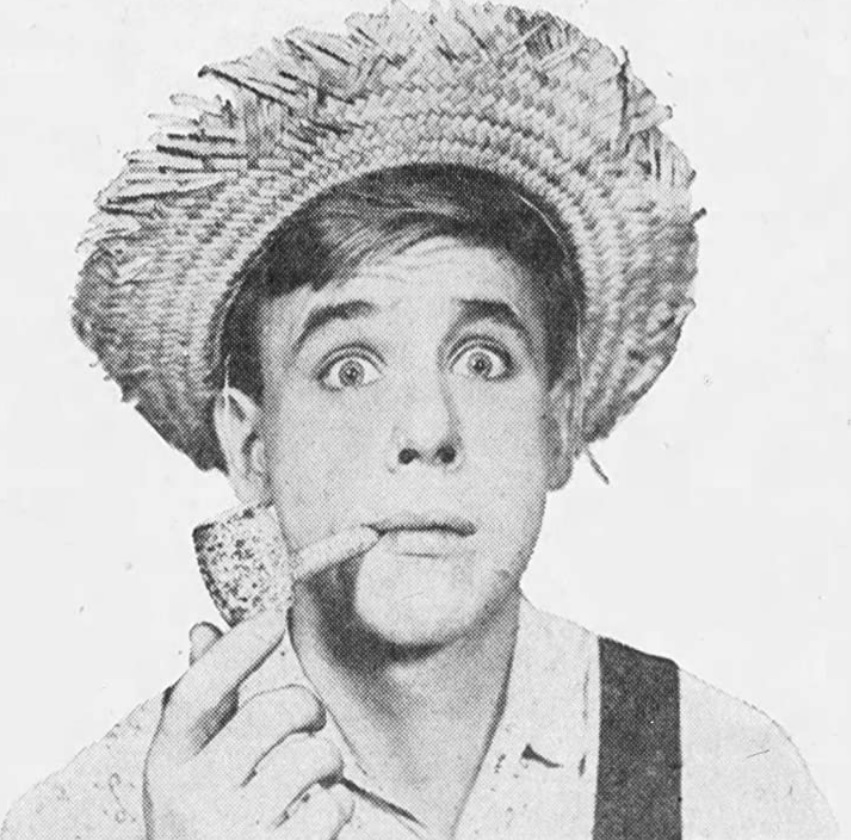
- Tom Sawyer (John Sharpe) puffs on a corncob pipe
- Directed by: John Haggott
- Written by: Frank Luther
- Based on: The Adventures of Tom Sawyer; 1876 novel by Mark Twain
- Starring: John Sharpe; Jimmy Boyd; Bennye Gatteys; Matt Mattox; Rose Bampton; Kevin Coughlin; Clarence Cooper
- Music by: Frank Luther
- Production companies: Theater Guild; The United States Steel Hour
- Distributed by: CBS
- Release date: November 21, 1956
- Running time: 60 minutes
- Country: United States
- Language: English

Tom Sawyer was a one-hour musical by Frank Luther, originally created for the television series The U.S. Steel Hour. It was broadcast live on CBS November 21, 1956, and marked the first time the anthology series had presented a musical. Luther said the show evolved from his re-reading of Mark Twain's The Adventures of Tom Sawyer a few years earlier: "(W)henever an incident or character gave me an idea for a song, I'd write the music and words," Luther told an interviewer in 1957. "By the time I'd reached the end of the book, I found I had written 32 songs. The cast included John Sharpe as Tom Sawyer, Jimmy Boyd as Huckleberry Finn, Bennye Gatteys as Becky Thatcher, Rose Bampton as Aunt Polly, Matt Mattox as Injun Joe and Clarence Cooper as Jim the Narrator. A cast album was released on Decca Records shortly after the broadcast, featuring several songs omitted from the original show. The show's sets and backgrounds were designed by Thomas Hart Benton. At the time of the broadcast, Sharpe was performing in the Broadway cast of The Most Happy Fella. Luther was commissioned to follow up the show with a musical adaptation of The Adventures of Huckleberry Finn, also starring Boyd, which was broadcast on The U.S. Steel Hour November 22, 1957. There does not appear to be any existing film or kinescope of either broadcast. There is a recording of the original broadcast audio in the New York Public Library's Toscanini Legacy Collection of Sound Recordings.

== Music ==
Luther's score for the teleplay includes these numbers: "In the Spring" (The Songspinners); "Missouri Meadowlark" (instrumental); "Spunkwater" (John Sharpe); "There's a New Girl in Town" (The Songspinners); "Why Would You Want to Kiss Me?" (Bennye Gattnes and the Girls); "Run Run Run" (The Songspinners); "We Will Never Tell" (The Songspinners); "What Do You Kiss For?" (John Sharpe and Bennye Gattnes); "That's the Life for Me" (John Sharpe, Jimmy Boyd and Kevin Coughlin); "He Wasn't a Bad Boy/Aunt Polly's Prayer" (Rose Bampton); "Storm Come A-Risin'" (The Songspinners); "I Wanna Go Home" (Kevin Coughlin and Jimmy Boyd); "The Time Has Come to Say Goodbye" (The Songspinners); "We'll All Shout Together in the Morning" (The Songspinners); "It Ain't Fer Me" (Jimmy Boyd); "Please Make Up" (John Sharpe and Bennye Gattnes); "Have a Happy Holiday" (The Songspinners); "MacDougal's Cave" (instrumental); "Have a Happy Holiday" (Reprise) (The Songspinners)

== Plot ==
Luther's teleplay begins with Tom and Huck making plans to steal away to the graveyard at midnight to cure Huck's warts by hurling a dead cat into the freshly dug grave of Old Hoss Williams. Later, Tom falls in love at first sight with Becky Thatcher as he sees her skipping rope with her friends, Amy and Susie. As Becky goes inside, she casually tosses a flower to Tom, who sits, lovestruck, beneath her window, until a housemaid dumps a basin of water on him. That night, in the graveyard. Tom and Huck witness the murder of Doc Robinson by Injun Joe, who is helping Robinson and Muff Potter in a grave-robbing scheme. Tom and Huck swear to remain silent about what they saw, fearing Injun Joe's retribution. When Becky accidentally tears a page in the schoolmaster's anatomy book, Tom takes the punishment—eight whippings—and wins her love. They share a kiss and become "engaged." But Becky spurns Tom after he reveals he and Amy Lawrence were previously engaged. Heartbroken, Tom rounds up Huck and Joe Harper and heads to a nearby island, where they plan to live as pirates. Free to do as he pleases at last, Tom swims, plays, takes up smoking a corncob pipe like Huck and enjoys the leisurely life for three days. But he secretly travels back to town to look in on Aunt Polly, who is grief-stricken and certain he has died. Soon after Tom returns to the island, a fierce storm hits, giving the would-be pirates second thoughts about staying. Afterward, the boys return home in time to crash their own funerals; the townspeople were all convinced they had drowned. Muff Potter is accused of the murder of Doc Robinson, but Tom testifies Injun Joe, also in court, was responsible. Before Injun Joe can be seized, he hurls himself through a courtroom window and escapes. Tom and Becky make up in time to attend a picnic at McDougal's Cave. While they are exploring the caverns, Tom and Becky run into Injun Joe, who is using the catacombs as a hideout. Injun Joe falls off a cliff, allowing them to escape, and the town rejoices as Tom and Becky return home.

An inaccurate preview in TV Guide listed "You Can't Teach an Old Dog New Tricks," a humorous solo for Aunt Polly, and "My Love Has Gone Away," a ballad for Becky, in the program of songs to be performed, but neither of them are included in the original broadcast. Promotional stills issued by CBS also depict a scene in which Becky catches Tom and Huck smoking their pipes and chastises them, an incident not included in the original teleplay.

== Cast ==
- John Sharpe as Tom Sawyer
- Jimmy Boyd as Huckleberry Finn
- Bennye Gatteys as Becky Thatcher
- Matt Mattox as Injun Joe
- Rose Bampton as Aunt Polly
- Kevin Coughlin as Joe Harper
- Bud Spencer as Ben Rogers
- Clarence Cooper as Jim the Narrator
- Buddy Schwab as Sid Rogers
- Guy Raymond as Muff Potter
- Gloria Kay as Susie Rogers
- Ina Kurland as Amy Lawrence
- Bernadine Read as The Maid
- Merrill Ostrus as The Schoolmaster
- Margaret Johnson as Mrs. Harper
- Harry Staton as the Preacher
- John Neher as the Prosecutor
- Helen Servis as Widow Douglas
- Miriam Gulager as Mary
- Tony Del Gatto as Young Doctor Robinson

== Reception ==
Variety raved, calling it "a captivating musical stanza" and noting that "(m)uch of the story was told in choreographic pantomime routines that were imaginatively staged against suggestive backgrounds designed by Thomas Hart Benton." Sharpe "played Tom with a convincing boyishness and was excellent in a couple of vocal duets with Bennye Gattnes, as Becky, on 'What Do You Kiss For' and 'Please Make Up.'" San Francisco Examiner critic Dwight Newton called the show "a 60 minute folk song. ... The TV show -- brushing briefly over the book's highlights -- had one thing in common with the book. It was something you'd like to look at again. And again." Newton also praised John Sharpe for "creating television excitement in the title role." Walter Hawver of Knickerbocker News hailed the show as "a television gem, an operetta in concept, pure entertainment in execution." Henry Mitchell of The Commercial Appeal hailed the show for treating Mark Twain's text "with unusual respect, approaching it neither as a sacred cow nor as a mere peg for some new tunes. ...'Tom' caught the general magic of the story quite well, and the use of an off-stage chorus was effective. The classic scenes of the story were beautifully done, and Alfred Hitchcock himself might have been proud of the graveyard." Staten Island Advance called it "charming and exuberant," with "stunning choreography, simple, catchy tunes, inventive harum-scarum book ... delight for youngsters and adults alike."

== Stage adaptation ==
A stage adaptation of the show, with the script rewritten and expanded by Richard H. Berger, Peter Gurney and Edward Reveaux, had its world premiere at Starlight Theatre in Kansas City, Mo. in July 1958. It starred Randy Sparks as Tom, Richard France as Huck and Virginia Gibson as Becky. It attracted more than 40,000 ticket-buyers in its initial run and was revived the next season with Sparks, France and Gibson repeating their roles.
