= Back to Hannibal: The Return of Tom Sawyer and Huckleberry Finn =

- Genre: Family; Drama
- Based on: The Adventures of Tom Sawyer and Adventures of Huckleberry Finn by Mark Twain
- Written by: Roy Johansen
- Directed by: Paul Krasny
- Starring: Raphael Sbarge; Mitchell Anderson; Megan Follows; William Windom; Ned Beatty; Paul Winfield
- Music by: Lee Holdridge
- Country of origin: United States
- Original language: English

Production
- Producer: Hugh Benson
- Cinematography: James W. Roberson
- Editor: Richard Rabjohn
- Running time: 92 minutes
- Production company: Walt Disney Television

Original release
- Network: Disney Channel
- Release: October 21, 1990

Back to Hannibal: The Return of Tom Sawyer and Huckleberry Finn is a 1990 American television family drama film directed by Paul Krasny and written by Roy Johansen, based on The Adventures of Tom Sawyer and Adventures of Huckleberry Finn by Mark Twain. It aired on the Disney Channel on October 21, 1990. In the film, Tom Sawyer and Huck Finn work to save their friend Jim from a charge of murder.

== Cast ==
- Raphael Sbarge as Tom Sawyer
- Megan Follows as Becky Thatcher
- Mitchell Anderson as Huckleberry Finn
- Zachary Bennett as Marcus
- Val Safron as Aunt Lucille
- Ned Beatty as Duke Of Bridgewater
- Paul Winfield as Jim Watson
- Joseph Bova as King of France
- William Windom as Judge
- Terry Snyed as Samuel Biggs

== Reception ==
The pilot gained a mixed reception from critics.
