= The Adventures of Tom Sawyer =

1876 novel by Mark Twain

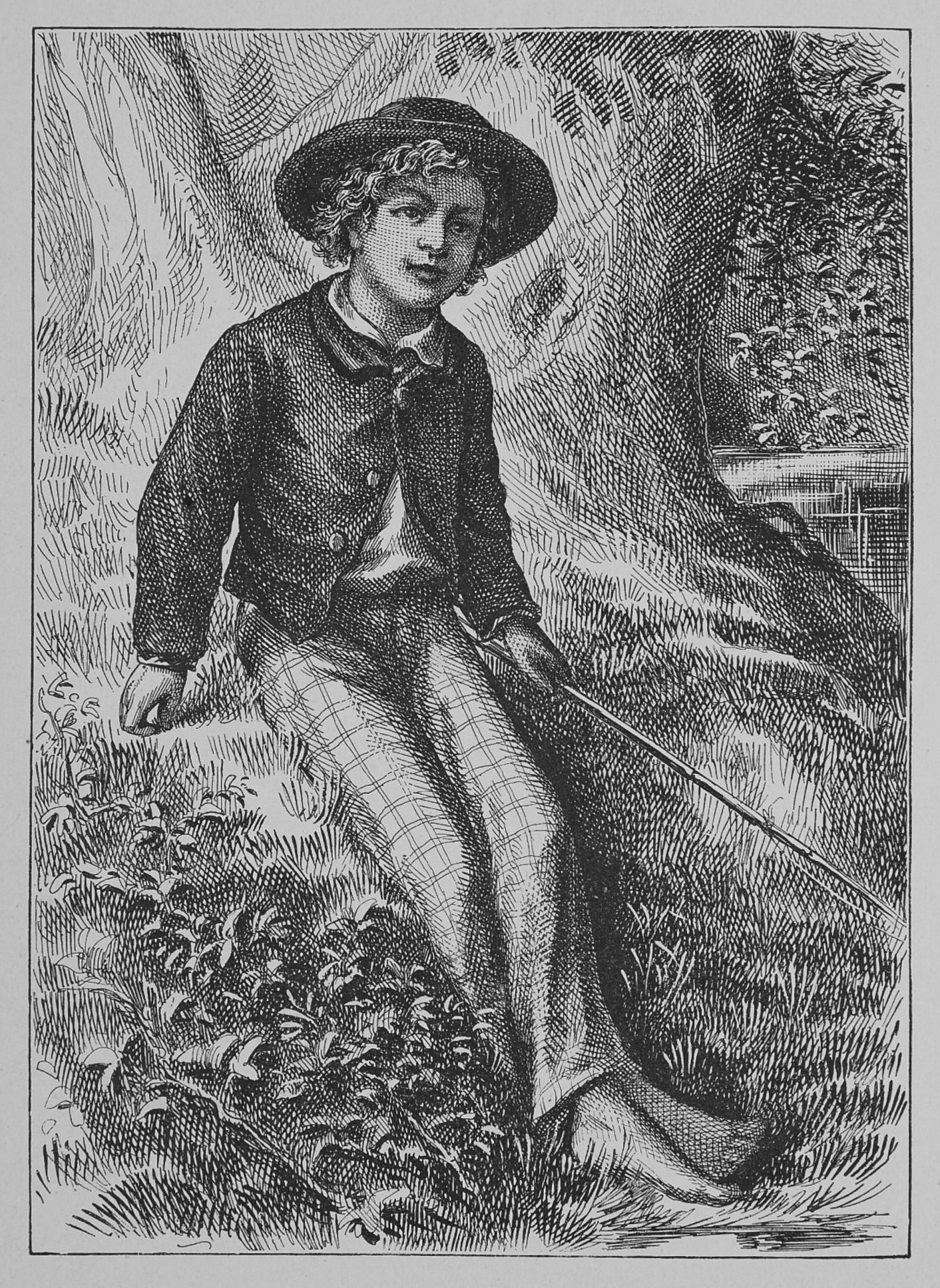
- Frontispiece of The Adventures of Tom Sawyer, 1876, first edition
- Author: Mark Twain
- Language: English
- Genre: Bildungsroman, picaresque novel, satire, folk, children's literature
- Publisher: American Publishing Company
- Publication date: June 9, 1876
- Publication place: United States
- Pages: 275
- OCLC: 47052486
- Dewey Decimal: 813.4
- LC Class: PZ7.T88 Ad 2001
- Followed by: Adventures of Huckleberry Finn
- Text: The Adventures of Tom Sawyer at Wikisource

The Adventures of Tom Sawyer (also simply known as Tom Sawyer) is a novel by Mark Twain (1835–1910) published on June 9, 1876, about a boy, Tom Sawyer, growing up along the Mississippi River. It is set in the 1830s–1840s in the fictional town of St. Petersburg, which is based on Hannibal, Missouri, where Twain lived as a boy. In the novel, Sawyer has several adventures, often with his friend Huckleberry Finn. Originally a commercial failure, the book ended up being the best-selling of Twain's works during his lifetime.

Along with its 1885 sequel, Adventures of Huckleberry Finn, the book is considered by many to be a masterpiece of American literature. It was alleged by Mark Twain to be one of the first novels to be written on a typewriter.

== Summary ==
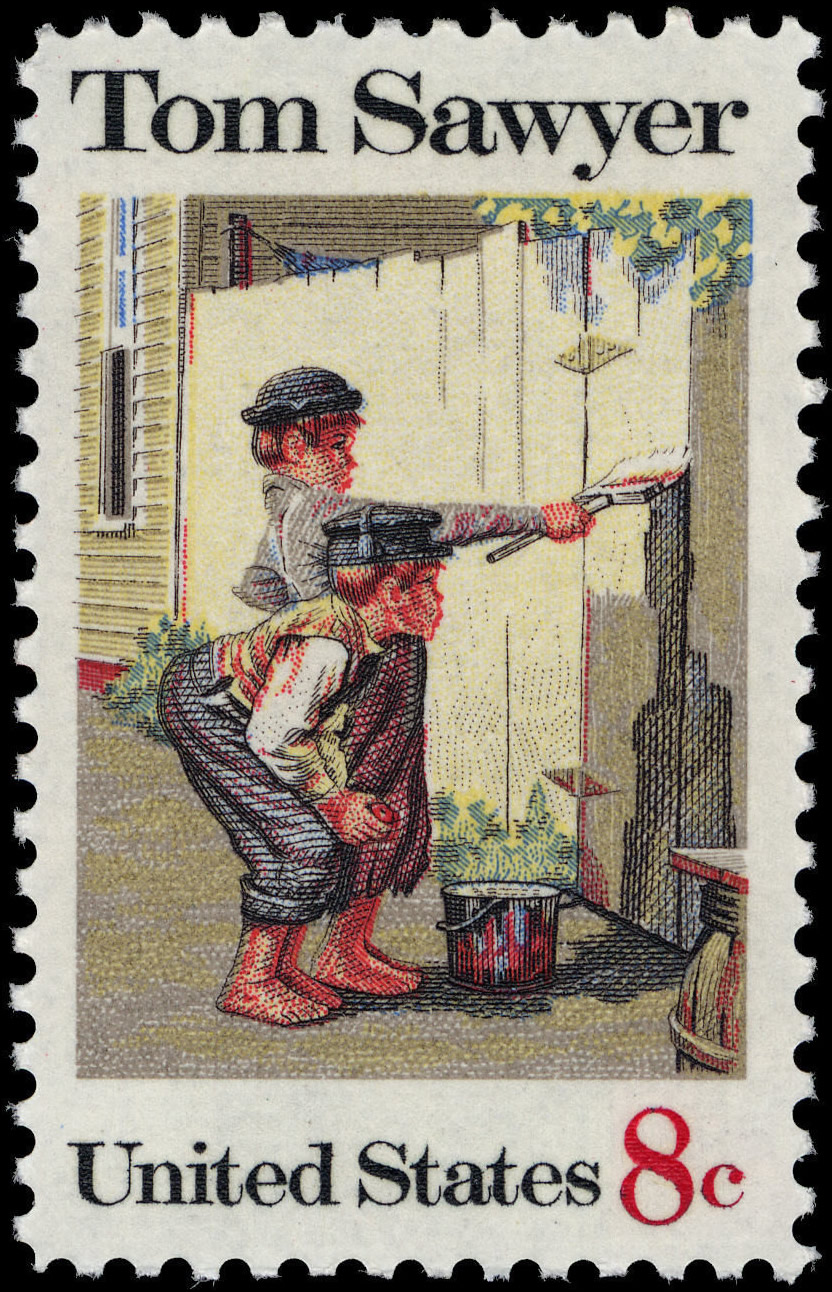
Tom Sawyer, 1972 US commemorative stamp showing the whitewashed fence

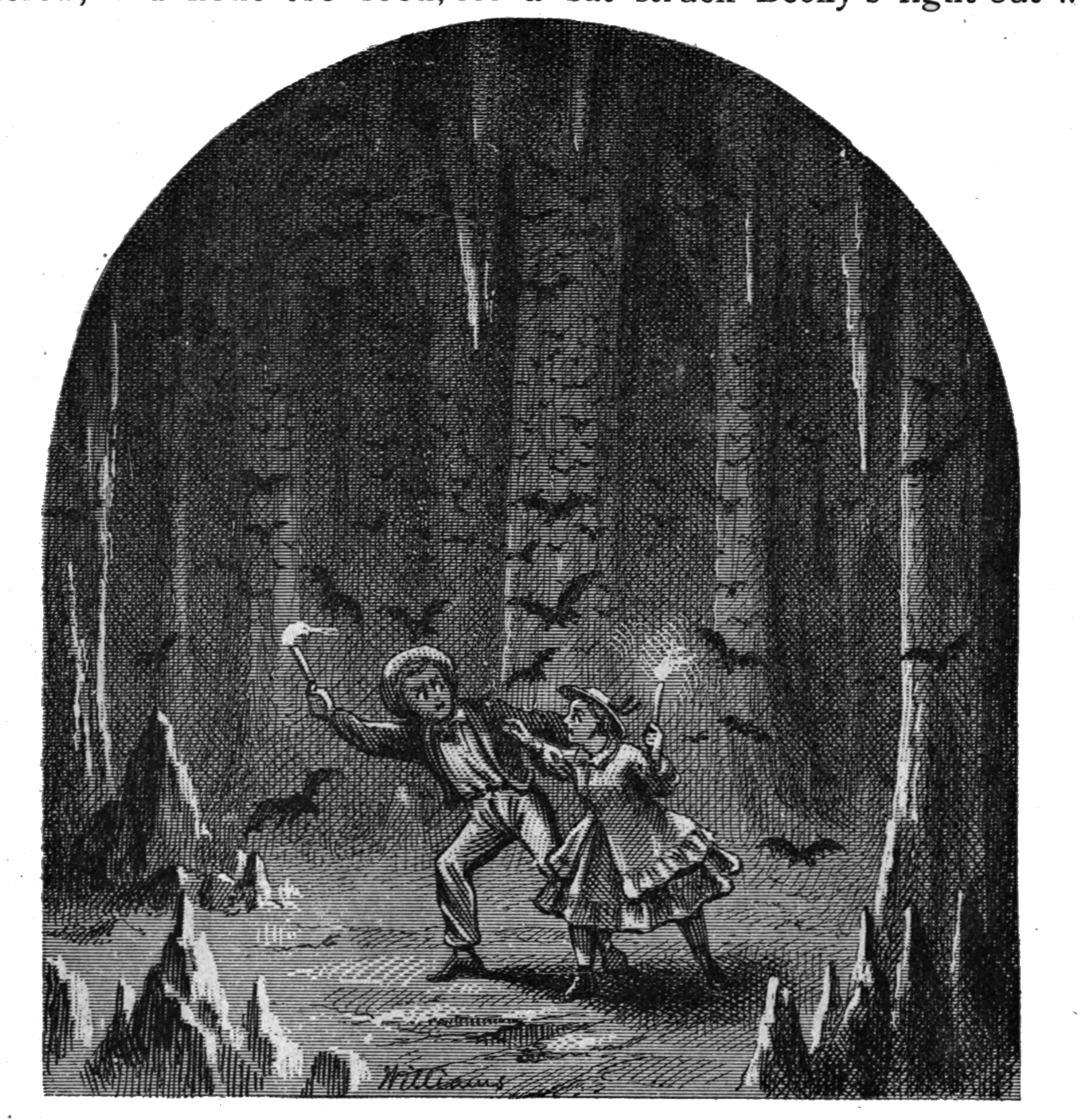
Tom and Becky lost in the caves. Illustration from the 1876 edition by artist True Williams.

Tom Sawyer, an orphan 12 or 13 years old, lives with his Aunt Polly and his half-brother Sid in the town of St. Petersburg, Missouri, sometime in the 1830s–1840s. He frequently skips school to play or go swimming. When Polly catches him sneaking home late on a Friday evening and discovers that he has been in a fight, she makes him whitewash her fence the next day as punishment.

Tom persuades several neighborhood children to trade him small trinkets and treasures for the "privilege" of doing his work, using reverse psychology to convince them of its enjoyable nature. Later, Tom trades the trinkets with students in his Sunday school class for tickets given out for memorizing verses of Scripture. He collects enough tickets to earn a prized Bible from the teacher, despite being one of the worst students in the class and knowing almost nothing of Scripture, eliciting envy from the students and a mixture of pride and shock from the adults.

Tom falls in love with Becky Thatcher, a girl who is new in town. Tom wins the admiration of her father, the prominent Judge Thatcher, in the church by obtaining the Bible as a prize, but reveals his ignorance when he cannot answer basic questions about Scripture. Tom pursues Becky, eventually persuading her to get "engaged" by kissing her. Their romance soon collapses when she discovers that Tom was "engaged" to another schoolgirl, Amy Lawrence. They start resenting each other.

While going to school, Tom meets Huckleberry "Huck" Finn, a vagrant boy whose freedom all the other boys admire. He tells Tom about his plan to go to a graveyard at midnight to perform a ritual intended to heal warts through a dead cat. At the graveyard, they witness three body snatchers, Dr. Robinson, Muff Potter and Injun Joe, robbing a grave. The three start fighting about money, during which Robinson knocks Potter unconscious and is then murdered by Injun Joe. When Potter wakes up, Injun Joe puts the weapon in his hand and tells him that he killed Robinson while drunk. Tom and Huck swear a blood oath not to tell anyone about the murder, fearing that Injun Joe will find out and kill them for revenge. Potter is arrested and jailed to await trial, not disputing Injun Joe's claim.

Tom grows bored with school, and he, his friend and classmate Joe Harper, and Huck run away to Jackson's Island in the Mississippi River to begin life as "pirates". While enjoying their freedom, they notice the community is scouring the river for their bodies, as the boys are missing and presumed dead by drowning in the river. Soon, Joe and Huck start feeling homesick, wanting to go back but are stopped by Tom. Tom sneaks back home the next night and finds Aunt Polly and Joe's mother sorrowfully talking about the boys. Tom returns to Joe and Huck and tells them about his plan to attend their own funeral. The three carry out this scheme, appearing at church in the middle of their joint funeral service and winning the respect of their classmates for the stunt.

Back in school, Becky tries to make Tom jealous by pretending to like another boy, but he stops paying her attention because of his newfound popularity. Becky rips a page in the school master's anatomy book after Tom startles her, but Tom regains her admiration by claiming responsibility for the damage and accepting the punishment that would have been hers.

During Potter's murder trial, Tom breaks his oath with Huck and testifies for the defense, identifying Injun Joe as the actual culprit. Injun Joe flees the courtroom before he can be apprehended; Potter is acquitted, but Tom and Huck now live in fear for their lives.

Once school lets out for the summer, Tom and Huck decide to hunt for buried treasure in the area in an abandoned house, where they are interrupted by the arrival of two men; one of them is a Spaniard, supposedly deaf-mute, who is actually Injun Joe in disguise. He and his partner plan to bury some stolen treasure in the house, but inadvertently discover a hoard of gold coins while doing so. They decide to move it to a new hiding place, which Tom and Huck are determined to find. They find out that Joe is hiding in an abandoned room in an inn. One night, Huck follows the men, who plan to break into the home of the wealthy Widow Douglas so Injun Joe can mutilate her face in revenge for having been publicly whipped for vagrancy by her now-deceased husband. Huck summons help from a nearby house and prevents the break-in, but asks that his name not be made public for fear of retaliation by Injun Joe.

Shortly before Huck stops the crime, Tom goes on a picnic to a local cave with Becky and their classmates. Tom and Becky become lost and wander in the cave for days, facing starvation and dehydration. Becky weakens, and Tom's search for a way out grows more desperate. He encounters Injun Joe by chance in the cave but is not seen. He eventually finds an exit, and he and Becky are joyfully welcomed back to town, learning that they have been missing for three days and traveled five miles (eight kilometers) from the entrance. Judge Thatcher has the cave's entrance door reinforced and locked. When Tom hears of this action two weeks later, he is horror-stricken, knowing that Injun Joe is still inside. He directs a posse to the cave, where they find Injun Joe dead of starvation right in front of the entrance.

A week later, having inferred from Injun Joe's presence that the stolen gold must be hidden in the cave, Tom takes Huck there in search of it. They find the gold, which totals over $12,000 (equivalent to $415,000 in 2025) and is invested on their behalf. The Widow Douglas adopts Huck as a reward for his saving her life. Huck finds the restrictions of a civilized home life painful and attempts to escape back to his vagrant life, but reluctantly returns to the widow, persuaded by Tom's offer to form a high-class robber gang.

== Significance ==
The novel has elements of humor, satire and social criticism – features that later made Mark Twain one of the most important authors of American literature. Mark Twain describes some autobiographical events in the book. The novel's setting of St. Petersburg is based on Twain's actual boyhood home of Hannibal, near St. Louis, and many of the places in it are real and today support a tourist industry as a result.

The concept of boyhood is developed through Tom's actions, including his runaway adventure with Joe and Huckleberry. In Twain's novel, Tom and his friend are young when they decide they want to learn how to smoke a pipe. Tom and Joe do this to show just how cool they are to the other boys.

== Inception ==
Tom Sawyer was Twain's first attempt to write a novel. He had previously written contemporary autobiographical narratives (The Innocents Abroad or The New Pilgrims' Progress and Roughing It) and two short texts called sketches which parody the youth literature of the time. These are The Story of the Good Boy and The Story of the Wicked Little Boy which are satirical texts of a few pages. In the first, a model child is never rewarded and ends up dying before he can declaim his last words which he has carefully prepared. In the second story, an evil little boy steals and lies, like Tom Sawyer, but finishes rich and successful. Tom appears as a mixture of these little boys since he is at the same time a scamp and a boy endowed with a certain generosity.

By the time he wrote Tom Sawyer, Twain was already a successful author based on the popularity of The Innocents Abroad. He owned a large house in Hartford, Connecticut, but needed another success to support himself, with a wife and two daughters. He had collaborated on a novel with Charles Dudley Warner, The Gilded Age, published in 1874.

He had earlier written an unpublished memoir of his own life on the Mississippi and had corresponded with a boyhood friend, Will Bowen, both of which had evoked many memories and were used as source material.

Twain named his fictional character after a San Francisco fireman whom he met in June 1863. The real Tom Sawyer was a local hero, famous for rescuing 90 passengers after a shipwreck. The two remained friendly during Twain's three-year stay in San Francisco, often drinking and gambling together.

== Publication ==
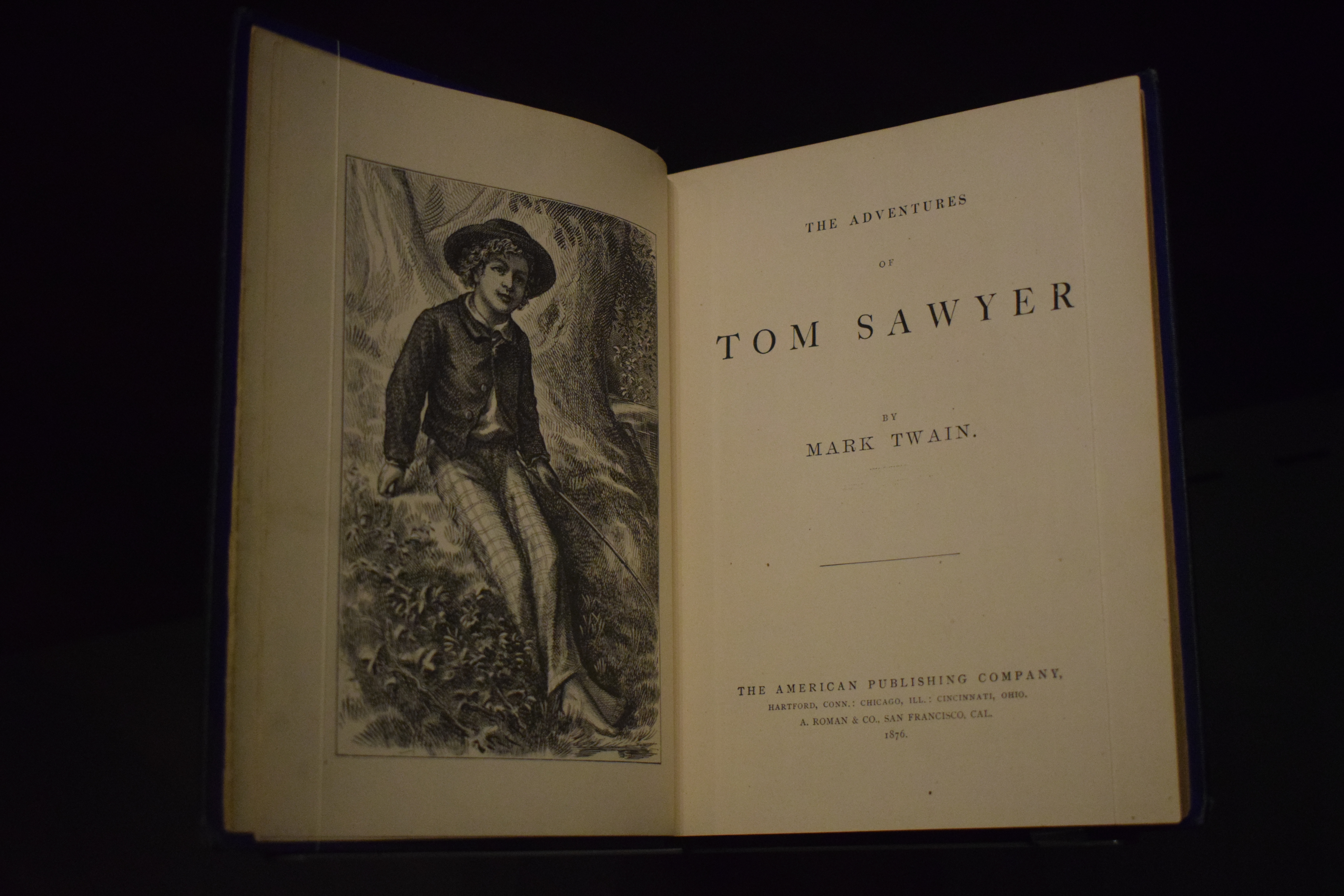
Frontispiece and title page of the first American edition

In November 1875, Twain gave the manuscript to Elisha Bliss of the American Publishing Company, who sent it to True Williams for the illustrations. A little later, Twain had the text also quickly published at Chatto and Windus of London, in June 1876, but without illustration. Pirate editions appeared very quickly in Canada and Germany. The American Publishing Company finally published its edition in December 1876, which was the first illustrated edition of Tom Sawyer.

== Criticism ==
A third person narrator describes the experiences of the boys, interspersed with occasional social commentary. In its sequel, Adventures of Huckleberry Finn, Mark Twain changes to a first person narrative. The two other subsequent books, Tom Sawyer Abroad and Tom Sawyer, Detective, are similarly in the first person narrative from the perspective of Huckleberry Finn.

The book has raised controversy for its use of the racial epithet "nigger"; a bowdlerized version aroused indignation among some literary critics.

The book has been criticized for its caricature-like portrayal of Native Americans through the character Injun Joe. He is depicted as malevolent for the sake of malevolence, is not allowed to redeem himself in any way by Twain, dies a pitiful and despairing death in a cave and upon his death is treated as a tourist attraction. Carter Revard suggests that the adults in the novel blame the character's Indian blood as the cause of his evil.

== Sequels and other works featuring Tom Sawyer ==
- Adventures of Huckleberry Finn (1884)
- Tom Sawyer Abroad (1894)
- Tom Sawyer, Detective (1896)

Tom Sawyer, the story's title character, also appears in two other uncompleted sequels: Huck and Tom Among the Indians and Tom Sawyer's Conspiracy. He is also a character in Twain's unfinished Schoolhouse Hill.

== Adaptations and influences ==
=== Film and television ===
- Tom Sawyer (1917), directed by William Desmond Taylor, starring Jack Pickford as Tom.
- Tom Sawyer (1930), directed by John Cromwell, starring Jackie Coogan as Tom.
- Tom Sawyer (1936), Soviet Union version directed by Lazar Frenkel and Gleb Zatvornitsky.
- The Adventures of Tom Sawyer (1938), Technicolor film by the Selznick Studio, starring Tommy Kelly as Tom and directed by Norman Taurog; notable is the cave sequence designed by William Cameron Menzies.
- Tom Sawyer (1956), a musical episode of the U.S. Steel Hour, written by Frank Luther and starring John Sharpe as Tom and Jimmy Boyd as Huck.
- The Adventures of Tom Sawyer (1960), BBC television series in seven episodes starring Fred Smith as Tom and Janina Faye as Becky. The series' theme song is "John Gilbert Is the Boat", sung by Peggy Seeger.
- Aventurile lui Tom Sawyer (1968), Romanian movie directed by Mircea Albulescu.
- Tom Sawyers und Huckleberry Finns Abenteuer (1968), a Romanian TV mini series directed by Mihai Iacob and Wolfgang Liebeneiner, starring Roland Demongeot as Tom and Marc Di Napoli as Huckleberry Finn.
- The New Adventures of Huckleberry Finn (1968), a half-hour live-action/animated series produced by Hanna-Barbera Productions.
- Las Aventuras de Juliancito (1969), Mexican film directed by Alberto Mariscal.
- Tom Sawyer (1973), musical adaptation by Robert B. Sherman and Richard M. Sherman, with Johnny Whitaker in the title role, Jeff East as Huck Finn, Jodie Foster as Becky Thatcher, and Celeste Holm as Aunt Polly.
- Mark Twain's Tom Sawyer (1973), TV movie sponsored by Dr Pepper, starring Buddy Ebsen as Muff Potter and filmed in Upper Canada Village.
- Páni kluci (1976), Czech movie directed by Věra Plívová-Šimková.
- Huckleberry Finn and His Friends (1979), Canadian/West German TV series starring Sammy Snyders as Tom and Ian Tracey as Huck.
- The Adventures of Tom Sawyer (1980), Japanese anime TV series by Nippon Animation, part of the World Masterpiece Theater, aired in the United States on HBO.
- The Adventures of Tom Sawyer and Huckleberry Finn (Приключения Тома Сойера и Гекльберри Финна), 1981 Soviet Union 3 episodes version directed by Stanislav Govorukhin.
- Rascals and Robbers: The Secret Adventures of Tom Sawyer and Huckleberry Finn (1982) a TV movie starring Patrick Creadon as Tom and Anthony Michael Hall as Huck.
- Sawyer and Finn (1983), American TV series pilot in which Tom Sawyer (Peter Horton) and Huck Finn (Michael Dudikoff) reunite by chance 10 years after the original story and seek new adventures in the Old West.
- Tom Sawyer (1984), Canadian claymation version produced by Hal Roach studios.
- The Adventures of Tom Sawyer (1986), TV movie produced by Burbank Animation Studios.
- Wishbone (1995), the first episode, "A Tail in Twain", has the title character imagining himself as Tom, with the character of Injun Joe being referred to as "Crazy Joe".
- Tom and Huck (1995), starring Jonathan Taylor Thomas as Tom and Brad Renfro as Huck Finn.
- The Animated Adventures of Tom Sawyer (1998), Canadian version, written by Bob Merrill and directed by William R. Kowalchuk Jr. Uses the voices of Ryan Slater, Christopher Lloyd and Kirsten Dunst.
- The Modern Adventures of Tom Sawyer (1998), American movie directed by Adam Weissman, starring Phillip Van Dyke as Tom.
- Tom Sawyer (2000), animated adaptation featuring the characters as anthropomorphic animals instead of humans with an all-star voice cast, including country singers Rhett Akins, Mark Wills, Lee Ann Womack, Waylon Jennings, and Hank Williams Jr. as well as Betty White.
- Thomas Sawyer, as a young adult, is a character in the movie League of Extraordinary Gentlemen, portrayed by Shane West. Here, Tom is a U.S. Secret Service agent who joins the team's fight against Professor Moriarty.
- Tom Sawyer (2011), German movie directed by Hermine Huntgeburth, starring Louis Hofmann as Tom and Leon Seidel as Huck.
- Tom Sawyer & Huckleberry Finn (2014), movie directed by Jo Kastner, starring Joel Courtney as Tom and Jake T. Austin as Huck.
- Band of Robbers (2015), American crime comedy film written and directed by Aaron and Adam Nee, starring Adam Nee as Tom and Kyle Gallner as Huck.

=== Music ===
- "Tom Sawyer" is a song by Canadian rock band Rush, originally released on their 1981 album Moving Pictures as its opener.

=== Theatrical ===
- From 1932 to 1933, German philosopher Theodor Adorno adapted The Adventures of Tom Sawyer as a ballad opera titled Der Schatz des Indianer-Joe (Treasure of Joe, the Indian). He never finished the musical accompaniment. The libretto was published by his wife Gretel Adorno and student Rolf Tiedemann in 1979.
- In 1956, We're From Missouri, a musical adaptation of The Adventures of Tom Sawyer, with book, music, and lyrics by Tom Boyd, was presented by the students at the Guildhall School of Music and Drama.
- In 1960, Tom Boyd's musical version (re-titled Tom Sawyer) was presented professionally at Theatre Royal Stratford East in London, England, and in 1961 toured provincial theatres in England.
- In 1981, the play The Boys in Autumn by the American dramatist Bernhard Sabath premiered in San Francisco. In the play, Tom Sawyer and Huck Finn meet again as old men. Despite good reviews, the play has remained largely unknown.
- In the 1985 musical Big River by William Hauptman and Roger Miller, Tom is a secondary character, played by John Short from 1985 to 1987.
- In 2001, the musical The Adventures of Tom Sawyer, by Ken Ludwig and Don Schlitz, debuted on Broadway.
- In 2015, the Mark Twain House and Museum selected 17-year-old Noah Altshuler (writer of Making the Move) as Mark Twain Playwright in Residence, to create a modern, meta-fictional adaptation of The Adventures of Tom Sawyer for regional and commercial production.

=== Ballet ===
Tom Sawyer: A Ballet in Three Acts premiered on October 14, 2011, at the Kauffman Center for the Performing Arts in Kansas City, Missouri. The score was by composer Maury Yeston, with choreography by William Whitener, artistic director of the Kansas City Ballet. A review in The New York Times observed: "It's quite likely that this is the first all-new, entirely American three-act ballet: it is based on an American literary classic, has an original score by an American composer and was given its premiere by an American choreographer and company. ... Both the score and the choreography are energetic, robust, warm, deliberately naïve (both ornery and innocent), in ways right for Twain."

=== Comic books ===
The Adventures of Tom Sawyer has been adapted into comic book form many times:

- Tom Sawyer and Huck Finn (Stoll & Edwards Co., 1925) – collection of the comic strip of the same name by Clare Victor Dwiggins, syndicated by the McClure Syndicate beginning in 1918
- Classics Illustrated #50: "The Adventures of Tom Sawyer" (Gilberton, August 1948) – adapted by Harry G. Miller and Aldo Rubano; reprinted extensively
- Dell Junior Treasury #10: "The Adventures of Tom Sawyer" (Dell Comics, October 1957) – adapted by Frank Thorne
- Joyas Literarias Juveniles #60: "Tom Sawyer detective" (Editorial Bruguera, 1972) – adapted by Miguel Cussó and Edmond Fernández Ripoll
- Tom Sawyer (Pendulum Illustrated Classics, Pendulum Press, 1973) – adapted by Irwin Shapiro and E. R. Cruz; reprinted in Marvel Classics Comics #7 (1976) and a number of other places
- Joyas Literarias Juveniles #182: "Las aventuras de Tom Sawyer" (Editorial Bruguera, 1977) – adapted by Juan Manuel González Cremona and Xirinius [as Jaime Juez]
- Classics Illustrated #9: The Adventures of Tom Sawyer (First Comics, May 1990) – adapted by Mike Ploog; reprinted in Classics Illustrated #19 (NBM, 2014)
- Tom Sawyer (An All-Action Classic #2) (Sterling Publishing, 2008) – adapted by Rad Sechrist
- Classics Illustrated Deluxe #4: The Adventures of Tom Sawyer (Papercutz, 2009) – adapted by Jean-David Morvan, Frederique Voulyze, and Severine Le Fevebvre
- The Adventures of Tom Sawyer (Capstone Publishers, 2007) – adapted by Daniel Strickland
- Manga Classics: The Adventures of Tom Sawyer (UDON Entertainment Manga Classics, April 2018) – adapted by Crystal Silvermoon and Kuma Chan

=== Video games ===
- The Adventures of Tom Sawyer, an action-platformer for the Nintendo Entertainment System. It was released by SETA in February 1989 in Japan and August that same year in North America.
- Square's Tom Sawyer, a role-playing video game for the Famicom produced by Square. It was released on November 30, 1989 in Japan.

=== Audio adaptations ===
2025: Radio Mirchi Kolkata's station aired The Adventures of Tom Sawyer in Bengali, translated by Pratik Kumar Mondal, Directed by Tomali Chaudhuri for Mirchi's Friday Classics Programme. Tom Sawyer was voiced by Usnish Bhaumik. Huckleberry Finn was voiced by Nirnay Pal.

=== Internet ===
On November 30, 2011, to celebrate Twain's 176th birthday, the Google Doodle was a scene from The Adventures of Tom Sawyer.

== See also ==
- Adventures of Huckleberry Finn
- List of Tom Sawyer characters
- Mark Twain bibliography
- National Tom Sawyer Days
- The Story of a Bad Boy
