= Tom Sawyer, Detective (film) =

1938 film by Louis King

- Theatrical release poster
- Directed by: Louis King
- Screenplay by: Robert Yost; Lewis R. Foster; Stuart Anthony
- Based on: Tom Sawyer, Detective by Mark Twain
- Starring: Billy Cook; Donald O'Connor; Porter Hall; Phil Warren; Janet Waldo; Elisabeth Risdon; William Haade
- Cinematography: Ted Tetzlaff
- Edited by: Ellsworth Hoagland
- Music by: Gerard Carbonara; John Leipold
- Production company: Paramount Pictures
- Distributed by: Paramount Pictures
- Release date: December 16, 1938
- Running time: 68 minutes
- Country: United States
- Language: English

Tom Sawyer, Detective is a 1938 American mystery comedy film directed by Louis King, written by Robert Yost, Lewis R. Foster and Stuart Anthony, and starring Billy Cook, Donald O'Connor, Porter Hall, Phil Warren, Janet Waldo, Elisabeth Risdon and William Haade. It was released on December 23, 1938, by Paramount Pictures.

== Plot ==
Aunt Polly sends Tom and Huck to Arkansas to spend the summer with Tom's Aunt Sally and Uncle Silas Phelps. Unsuccessful lawyer Jeff Rutledge wants to marry Sally and Silas' daughter, Ruth, but wealthy Brace Dunlap also has eyes for her. At the end of the summer, Tom and Huck return to St. Petersburg to return to school. At the start of the following summer, Aunt Sally calls Tom and Huck back to help with the farm since Uncle Silas is in frail health. Aboard the steamship to Arkansas, Tom and Huck are approached by two men claiming to be detectives who ask for their help in finding out about a passenger. At first, Tom and Huck think the man in question is Jupiter Dunlap, the lazy oaf who was supposed to be working on Aunt Sally and Uncle Silas' farm. But the man confesses to being Jake Dunlap, Jupiter's twin brother, who was believed to have died. Jake is carrying two diamonds worth $20,000 inside the hollow heel of his boot and he is certain the "detectives" are actually a pair of thieves trying to rob and kill him. Tom and Huck help Jake disguise himself so he can slip off the boat during a stopover.

At Uncle Silas and Aunt Sally's place, Tom and Huck learn Brace Dunlap has been spreading vicious gossip about Uncle Silas losing his mind. When Jupiter makes a crack about Uncle Silas allowing Ruth to marry white trash, Uncle Silas hits him over the head with a stick, temporarily knocking him out. Uncle Silas fears he's killed Jupiter and runs off. Recovering from the blow, Jupiter runs to Brace for help and assists him in killing Jake Dunlap, who is hiding out in a nearby cabin. Brace concocts a plan to dress Jake's body in Jupiter's clothes and dump him in the place where Uncle Silas assaulted Jupiter; this should ensure Uncle Silas will be accused of murder. The next morning, Brace drops by Uncle Silas' farm and asks to see Jupiter. When Uncle Silas tries to stonewall him, Brace threatens to get Sheriff Slocum involved. Tom and Huck borrow a bloodhound and go in search of Jupiter's body. The sheriff's posse is also hunting for the corpse. The bloodhound runs away and finds the body just as the sheriff and his men show up. Shortly afterward, Sheriff Slocum shows up at the house and arrests Silas for murder.

The night before the trial, Tom and Huck attempt to help Uncle Silas escape from jail, but Aunt Sally refuses to let Uncle Silas leave. Jeff plans to defend Uncle Silas in court, although the outlook is bleak. Tom and Huck head to the graveyard to break into the Dunlap family crypt and open Jupiter's coffin. The gate of the crypt locks and they're trapped inside. At the trial, the prosecution calls the mysterious Kaylen Joshua Peters; he's actually Jupiter pretending to be a mute who witnessed Uncle Silas killing and burying Jupiter. After Tom and Huck escape the crypt, they encounter St. Louis sheriff Walker, who has arrested the two men Tom and Huck met on the boat. Sheriff Walker tells Tom and Huck there's a generous reward for the return of the stolen diamonds, and they rush off to the courthouse.

Tom asks the judge to let him question Peters on the stand. At Tom's request, Sheriff Slocum removes the steel plate from the bottom of the boot Peters is wearing and the pair of diamonds are revealed. Tom then tells the court Jupiter Dunlap got his name from a collection of moles on his leg that looked like the planet Jupiter and its moons. Those moles were not on the body of the man in Jupiter Dunlap's grave. Peters tries in vain to flee the courthouse and then drops his act, telling the judge and jury Brace forced him to go along with the scheme. Jeff tells the judge Brace and Jupiter should be tried for killing and burying Jake Dunlap and trying to frame Uncle Silas for the murder. The case against Uncle Silas is dismissed and the courtroom erupts in cheers.

== Cast ==
- Billy Cook as Tom Sawyer
- Donald O'Connor as Huckleberry Finn
- Porter Hall as Uncle Silas
- Phil Warren as Jeff Rutledge
- Janet Waldo as Ruth Phelps
- Elisabeth Risdon as Aunt Sally
- William Haade as Jupiter Dunlap
- Edward Pawley as Brace Dunlap
- Clem Bevans as Sheriff Slocum
- Raymond Hatton as Judge Tyler
- Howard M. Mitchell as Prosecutor
- Stanley Price as Clayton
- Harry Worth as Dixon
- Clara Blandick as Aunt Polly
- Si Jenks as Farmer Sykes
- Etta McDaniel as Tulip
- Oscar Smith as Curfew
- Monte Blue as Sheriff Walker
- Foy Van Dolsen as Alex Cooper
- Robert Homans as Ship's Captain (uncredited)
- Murdock MacQuarrie as Posse Member (uncredited)

== Production ==
Paramount Pictures had announced plans to film Tom Sawyer, Detective in 1931, after the 1930 version of Tom Sawyer was a major box office success. Originally, Jackie Coogan and Junior Durkin were going to reprise their roles as Tom and Huck. Seven years later, Paramount announced Tommy Kelly and Jackie Moran, who had just completed The Adventures of Tom Sawyer, would play Tom and Huck in Paramount's Tom Sawyer, Detective. But when the movie went into production several months later, Billy Cook and Donald O'Connor had been cast as Tom and Huck instead.
