= The Adventures of Tom Sawyer (1938 film) =

1938 American film directed by Norman Taurog

- Theatrical release poster
- Directed by: Norman Taurog
- Written by: John V.A. Weaver
- Based on: The Adventures of Tom Sawyer; 1876 novel by Mark Twain
- Produced by: David O. Selznick
- Starring: Tommy Kelly; Jackie Moran; May Robson; Ann Gillis; Walter Brennan; Victor Jory
- Cinematography: James Wong Howe
- Music by: Max Steiner (uncredited)
- Color process: Technicolor
- Production company: Selznick International Pictures
- Distributed by: United Artists
- Release date: February 17, 1938; (New York City)
- Running time: 91 minutes
- Country: United States
- Language: English
- Budget: $1.5 million
- Box office: $2 million (U.S. and Canada rentals)

The Adventures of Tom Sawyer is a 1938 American Technicolor drama film produced by David O. Selznick and directed by Norman Taurog who had previously directed Huckleberry Finn (1931) with Jackie Coogan and Junior Durkin. The film starred Tommy Kelly in the title role, with Jackie Moran and Ann Gillis. The screenplay by John V. A. Weaver was based on the classic 1876 novel of the same name by Mark Twain. The movie was the first film version of the novel to be made in color.

== Plot ==
The United Artists release includes most of the sequences familiar to readers of the book, including the fence-whitewashing episode; Tom and Huckleberry Finn's attendance at their own funeral, after the boys, who were enjoying an adventure on a remote island, are presumed dead; the murder trial of local drunkard Muff Potter; and Tom and Becky Thatcher's flight through a cave as they try to escape Injun Joe, who is revealed to be the real killer.

== Cast ==
- Tommy Kelly as Tom Sawyer
- Jackie Moran as Huckleberry Finn
- Ann Gillis as Becky Thatcher
- May Robson as Aunt Polly
- Walter Brennan as Muff Potter
- Victor Jory as Injun Joe
- David Holt as Sid Sawyer
- Victor Kilian as Sheriff
- Nana Bryant as Mrs. Thatcher
- Olin Howland as Mr. Dobbins, school teacher
- Donald Meek as Sunday School Superintendent
- Charles Richman as Judge Thatcher
- Margaret Hamilton as Mrs. Harper
- Marcia Mae Jones as Mary Sawyer
- Mickey Rentschler as Joe Harper
- Cora Sue Collins as Amy Lawrence
- Philip Hurlic as Little Jim
- Frank McGlynn Sr. as Minister (uncredited)
- Roland Drew as Dr. Robinson (uncredited)

Note: Many cast lists included an uncredited Spring Byington as Widow Douglas. However, Huck's adoption is not included in this version, and Byington's role does not appear to have survived editing.

== Production notes ==
The Adventures of Tom Sawyer was the fourth film adaptation of the Twain novel, following versions released in 1907, 1917, and 1930, and this is the first filmed in Technicolor.

H. C. Potter originally was signed to direct but was fired and replaced by Taurog after George Cukor declined the assignment. Cukor directed some scenes, but received no on-screen credit for his contributions.

Tommy Kelly, a Bronx fireman's son, was selected for the title role through a national campaign waged by producer David O. Selznick, who later would conduct a similar search for an actress to portray Scarlett O'Hara in Gone with the Wind. According to a 1937 memo he sent to story editor Katharine Brown, he originally hoped to cast an orphan as Tom, feeling such a stunt would receive "tremendous attention and arouse such a warm public feeling that it would add enormously to the gross of the picture." Kelly failed to achieve the star status of fellow child actor Freddie Bartholomew, and after an inconsequential career he retired and later became a school teacher.

After reading the comment cards completed by an audience at a sneak preview of the film, Selznick sent director Taurog a memo expressing concern about the climactic scene in the cave, which many viewers had described as "too horrible for children." He advised Taurog "this worried me, because we certainly want the picture to be for a family audience," and as a result he was cutting a close-up of Becky, in which her hysteria was "perhaps a shade too much that of a very ill woman, rather than that of a little girl," "with regrets."

On the strength of the designs for the cave sequence executed by William Cameron Menzies, Selznick hired him for Gone with the Wind.

Some exterior scenes were filmed at Big Bear Lake, Lake Malibu, Paramount Ranch in Agoura, California, and RKO's Encino movie ranch. Other scenes were filmed on recycled sets left over from A Star is Born (1937), such as the Blodgett family home interior (kitchen, living room, and bedroom), and a silhouette of a wolf howling at the Moon. Mississippi River long shots from Tom Sawyer would later be reused in MGM's 1951 musical Show Boat.

== Reception ==
The movie premiered at the Radio City Music Hall, and B. R. Crisler of The New York Times wrote that Tommy Kelly was "a miracle of casting" and called the film "one of the better pictures of the year" on the strength of the source material alone, but also criticized the film for including scenes of "cheap and obvious" slapstick involving such things as tomatoes and cake icing. Crisler told producer David O. Selznick to "get busy on 'Gone with the Wind', will you, before WE begin throwing tomatoes." Variety wrote that Selznick had "pulled no financial punches" in mounting the production and that while the film was generally faithful to the book, an "excellent job" had been done on the new dialogue written for the screen. Film Daily called it "a triumph for all concerned." John Mosher of The New Yorker praised Kelly and Gillis as "altogether very much the Twain children" and called Weaver's screenplay "excellent".

Time Out London called the film "extraordinarily handsome to look at, with exquisite Technicolor camerawork by Wong Howe and some imaginative designs . . . [it] has its longueurs, but it does capture the sense of a lazy Mississippi summer and much of the spirit of the book, with Jory making a superbly villainous Injun Joe."

TV Guide described it as "a lively production featuring a quick pace, a chilling climax, and a surprising amount of wit."

== Award nominations ==
It received a nomination for an Oscar for Best Art Direction, and the Venice Film Festival Mussolini Cup for Best Film.

== Financial performance ==
The film lost $302,000 at the box office.

== Sequel ==
Metro-Goldwyn-Mayer released a version of Twain's The Adventures of Huckleberry Finn with a different cast the following year, replacing Jackie Moran with Mickey Rooney.
