= The Adventures of Tom Sawyer (1960 TV series) =

Limited television series

- Written by: C. E. Webber
- Starring: Fred Smith; Mike Strotheide; Betty Hardy; Lorna Henderson; Lindsay Scott-Patton; Janina Faye; Mike Taylor; John Evans; Peter Chenault; Michael Phillips; Stanley Little; Barry Canton; Deering Wells
- Country of origin: United Kingdom
- No. of episodes: 7

Production
- Producer: Dorothea Brooking

Original release
- Network: BBC
- Release: July 24 – September 4, 1960

The Adventures of Tom Sawyer is a seven-part series produced by the BBC which originally aired on the BBC from July 24, 1960 to September 4, 1960. After it was broadcast in England, it was brought to the United States as part of the What's New? series on National Educational Television. Fred Smith, who played Tom Sawyer, and Mike Strotheide, who played Huckleberry Finn, were the sons of American servicemen stationed in Britain; the rest of the cast was primarily British. The teleplay was adapted from Mark Twain's The Adventures of Tom Sawyer by C. E. Webber and incorporated folk songs from Peggy Seegar.

== Reception ==
Allen Wright of The Scotsman, reviewing the series during its initial run, noted, "BBC Children's television is making a splendid job of Mark Twain's Adventures of Tom Sawyer. This adaptation by C. E. Webber captures the inspiring and exhilarating quality of the humorist's original."

Phillip Purser of The News Chronicle wrote, "(Y)ou could hardly have anyone who looks more Tom Sawyerish than young Fred Smith, who has all the regulation features of American boyhood, including freckles, jug ears and wide-spaced teeth. In the first episode, which told how Tom applied elementary capitalist principles to earning himself a Sunday-school Bible, he occupied the role with considerable charm, in particular sustaining some direct addresses to the camera which might have unnerved anyone."

== Episodes ==
No.	Title	Directed by	Written by	Original release date
1	"Clever Tom"	Unknown	C. E. Webber	July 24, 1960
Tom Sawyer is a 12-year-old boy who lives in St. Petersburg, Missouri in the 1840s. Tom plays hooky from school and goes swimming with Huckleberry Finn, the town pariah. On his way home, Tom catches sight of Becky Thatcher (Janina Faye), the new girl in town, and Tom is instantly smitten. At dinner, Tom's half-brother, Sid (Lindsay Scott-Patton), tattles on Tom and Aunt Polly punishes him by ordering him to whitewash the fence the next day. Tom pretends he's enjoying the chore to trick to hoodwink several friends into doing the work for him and trading him their prize possessions for the opportunity. On Sunday, Tom's sympathetic cousin, Mary (Lorna Henderson), coaches him on learning Bible verses so he can collect tickets to win a Bible in Sunday School. Instead of learning the verses, Tom trades the items he collected during the whitewashing escapade to his friends for their tickets. Tom turns in the tickets to collect his Bible, hoping to impress Becky. All goes smoothly until Judge Thatcher (Deering Wells) quizzes Tom on what he's studied; Tom's ignorant answers cause red faces all around.
2	"A Cure for Warts"	Unknown	C.E._Webber	July 31, 1960
Huck Finn consults Old Mother Hopkins, the local witch, about curing his warts. She suggests taking a dead cat to the graveyard at midnight, hurling the cat into the open grave of an evil man and saying a supposedly magical incantation. In the schoolyard, Tom runs into Huck, who explains his plan to venture into the graveyard that night. Tom begs to come along and Huck agrees. Although the school bell is ringing, Tom prefers to study corncob pipe-smoking with Huck. The schoolmaster makes the tardy Tom sit with the girls as punishment, which gives Tom the opportunity to take a seat next to Becky Thatcher. After school, Tom asks Becky about getting engaged. He kisses her and all seems fine until he lets it slip that he was previously engaged to Amy Lawrence. Feeling betrayed, Becky runs off. That night, Huck and Tom make their way to the grave of Hoss Williams. Muff Potter (Jack Smethurst), the local drunk, and Injun Joe (John Bennett), a notorious "half-breed," enter the graveyard with Doc Robinson, a suspected body snatcher. The men quarrel, Robinson knocks Potter unconscious and Injun Joe stabs Robinson to death, then puts his knife in Potter's hand. When Potter awakens, Injun Joe accuses Potter of the slaying. Huck and Tom flee the scene and swear never to tell anyone what they've seen, lest Injun Joe find out and kill them both.
3	"The Saving of Muff Potter"	Unknown	C. E. Webber	August 7, 1960
At school, Tom overhears his friends talking about the murder and planning to go to the graveyard to see the scene of the crime. Muff Potter has been taken to jail, where he meets with a lawyer. Muff remembers little of the circumstances of the night, aside from Doc Robinson paying him five dollars to help steal a body. Muff tells the lawyer he spent the money on liquor and was drunk when he got to the graveyard. Tom and Huck deliver some gifts to Muff. The trial begins, and things look bad for Muff since he can't refute Injun Joe's claims that he killed Doc Robinson in a drunken rage. Tom and Huck make another visit to Muff's window and find him resigned to his fate, convinced he's going to be hanged for the murder. After dark, Tom sneaks out of the house and visits Muff's lawyer. The next day, the trial resumes and the defense calls Tom to the stand. Under oath, Tom recounts his visit to the graveyard and what he saw, prompting Injun Joe to jump out an open window. Muff is released and "wanted" posters of Injun Joe are put around town.
4	"Gone But Not Forgotten"	Unknown	C. E. Webber	August 15, 1960
Tom worries when Becky stays home sick from school. His lack of appetite and "doleful" attitude lead Aunt Polly to suspect he's sick, so she gives him a dose of a foul-tasting painkiller. Later, Tom steals the painkiller bottle and plans to pour it out, but instead gives Peter the cat a taste of it. The cat goes berserk. Tom meets up with Joe Harper (Barry Canton), tracks down Huck, and the trio decide to be pirates and set sail for Jackson's Island. The boys are thrilled to camp out on the island, catching and cooking fish, swimming, playing "Indian" and exploring. Huck spots a ferryboat firing a cannon over the water, an indicator that someone has drowned. Tom quickly realizes the search is for them, a revelation that delights the boys. While Joe and Huck sleep, Tom steals away from camp and travels back home, where he eavesdrops on Aunt Polly, Mrs. Harper and Mary as they try to comfort each other. Tom hears them say that unless the boys turn up before Sunday, a funeral is being planned. Weary and heartbroken, Aunt Polly finally goes to bed. Tom creeps into her room and kisses her while she sleeps, then heads back to the island.
5	"Noble Tom"	Unknown	C. E. Webber	August 22, 1960
Tom returns to the island to tell Huck and Joe about the plans for the funeral service. Tom practices smoking his newly acquired corncob pipe as he, Joe and Huck make plans to attend the funeral. At the Sunday church service, the minister tells the congregation what model boys Joe and Tom were. As the mourners wail, Tom, Huck and Joe appear in the church, shocking everyone. Later, Aunt Polly reprimands Tom for his trickery and thoughtlessness, but Tom claims he was planning to leave a message for her that he'd written on a piece of bark that's still in the pocket of his jacket. She sends him off to school, then dares herself to check his pocket. When she finds the bark, she is overjoyed and forgives him for everything. In the schoolyard, Tom smokes his pipe to impress the other boys and tells tall tales about his pirating escapades. Although Becky tries to attract his attention, Tom rebuffs her and flirts with Amy Lawrence instead. To save face, Becky pretends she's interested in goody-goody Alfred Temple. Soon, Alfred and Tom get into a fistfight, which Tom wins. Vengeful Alfred splashes ink all over Tom's lesson book, knowing the schoolmaster will whip Tom for it. Meanwhile, Becky opens up the schoolmaster's desk to look at the anatomy book he keeps locked up. When Tom returns, he startles Becky and she accidentally rips a page out of the book. She's terrified when Tom tells her she's get whipped for it. But when the schoolmaster begins questioning the students, Tom claims he did it. As Tom takes a beating, Becky weeps, stunned by Tom's sacrifice.
6	"Buried Treasure"	Unknown	C. E. Webber	August 29, 1960
Tom and Huck are unaware Injun Joe has returned to town incognito. They're busy planning a treasure hunt, and Tom coerces Huck into continuing searching in a haunted house. They don't know another team is also headed there: Injun Joe has sworn revenge on the Widder Douglas because her late husband had him locked up and horse-whipped in front of the whole town. Ned, Injun Joe's partner, is more interested in robbing the Widder's well-furnished home. Tom and Huck reach the haunted house first and run for cover when they hear the familiar sound of Injun Joe's voice. He and Ned have stolen $650 and are looking for a place to stash it. When they look in the fireplace, they find a box of gold hidden beneath a loose slab. Injun Joe discovers Tom and Huck's tools in the house and starts searching for them, but he gives up after the staircase partially collapses under his weight. Ned and Injun Joe exit with the gold after planning to return to the house the next night at midnight. Tom and Huck come out of hiding, planning to meet the following evening and track Injun Joe and Ned to find the gold. The next morning, Tom dresses up in a fancy suit to call on Becky; they are joining a picnic party in MacDougal's Cave. Huck spies on Ned and Injun Joe and then follows them toward the Widder Douglas' house. Huck sends help to the Widder's house to protect her and a shootout ensues, in which Injun Joe grabs the loot from Ned and pushes him off a bluff into the river. Huck faints from exhaustion and the Widder takes him in.
7	"Lost and Found"	Unknown	C. E. Webber	September 4, 1960
During their excursion in MacDougal's Cave, Tom and Becky got separated from their group when dozens of bats startled them. They are now lost and getting increasingly worried. At breakfast time, a breathless Jeff Thatcher (Mike Taylor) calls on Aunt Polly, Mary and Sid and says search parties are being sent out. With Becky too weak to explore, Tom decides to look for an exit and during his wanderings he is mortified to see a sleeping Injun Joe, perilously close by. Tom finds a crevice that's big enough to escape through. News of Tom and Becky's return lifts the spirits of the townspeople. Judge Thatcher has the cave entrance sealed with a heavily barred steel door; a trapped Injun Joe starves to death inside. Tom leads Huck back to the cave to find the treasure box in Injun's Joe's lair. The Widder Douglas throws a lavish party in Tom and Huck's honor and the boys surprise everyone by marching in with bags of gold coins, worth at least $12,000. Weeks later, Tom finds Huck living inside an old barrel once more. Huck says he can't stand living by the Widder's strict guidelines and has run away. Tom convinces him to give it another try by promising Huck a spot in the band of robbers he's about to start and assuring Huck he will speak to the Widder about relaxing her rules. Huck relents, and Tom and Huck smoke Huck's corncob pipe together to seal the pact.
