= Jon Clinch =

American novelist

Jon Clinch is an American novelist. Originally from Oneida, New York, he graduated from Syracuse University and went on to teach American literature. Formerly creative director for various advertising agencies in the Philadelphia area, he now lives in Vermont. He has written stories which have been published in MSS magazine.

== Works ==
In February 2007 Random House published his first novel, Finn, a critically acclaimed backstory about "Pap Finn", Huckleberry Finn's father from Mark Twain's Adventures of Huckleberry Finn (1884).

Named an American Library Association Notable Book, Finn was also named one of the best novels of 2007 by the Washington Post, the Chicago Tribune, the Christian Science Monitor and Book Sense. It was also shortlisted for the National Book Critics Circle's first-ever Best Recommended List and the Sargent First Novel Prize.

Clinch's second novel, Kings of the Earth, was published by Random House in July 2010 to wide critical acclaim, and was named #1 on the annual summer reading list published by O, The Oprah Magazine.

Marley, his reimagining of the world of Charles Dickens's A Christmas Carol, was published by Simon & Schuster's Atria imprint in October 2019. Reviewing the book in the New York Times, critic Simon Callow wrote, "By some uncanny act of artistic appropriation, [Clinch] has, without imitating Dickens, entered into the phantasmagoric realm that is the great novelist’s quintessential territory. Clinch has done something remarkable in Marley, not merely offering a parergon to Dickens’s little masterpiece, imagining the soil out of which the action of A Christmas Carol grows, but creating a free-standing dystopian universe, a hideous vision of nascent capitalism in which nothing is real and every transaction is a fraud."

In 2023, Clinch published The General and Julia.
