= Páni kluci =

1976 Czech adventure film

- Directed by: Věra Plívová-Šimková
- Starring: Michael Dymek; Petr Vorísek
- Release date: 1 March 1976
- Running time: 1h 25min
- Country: Czechoslovakia
- Language: Czech

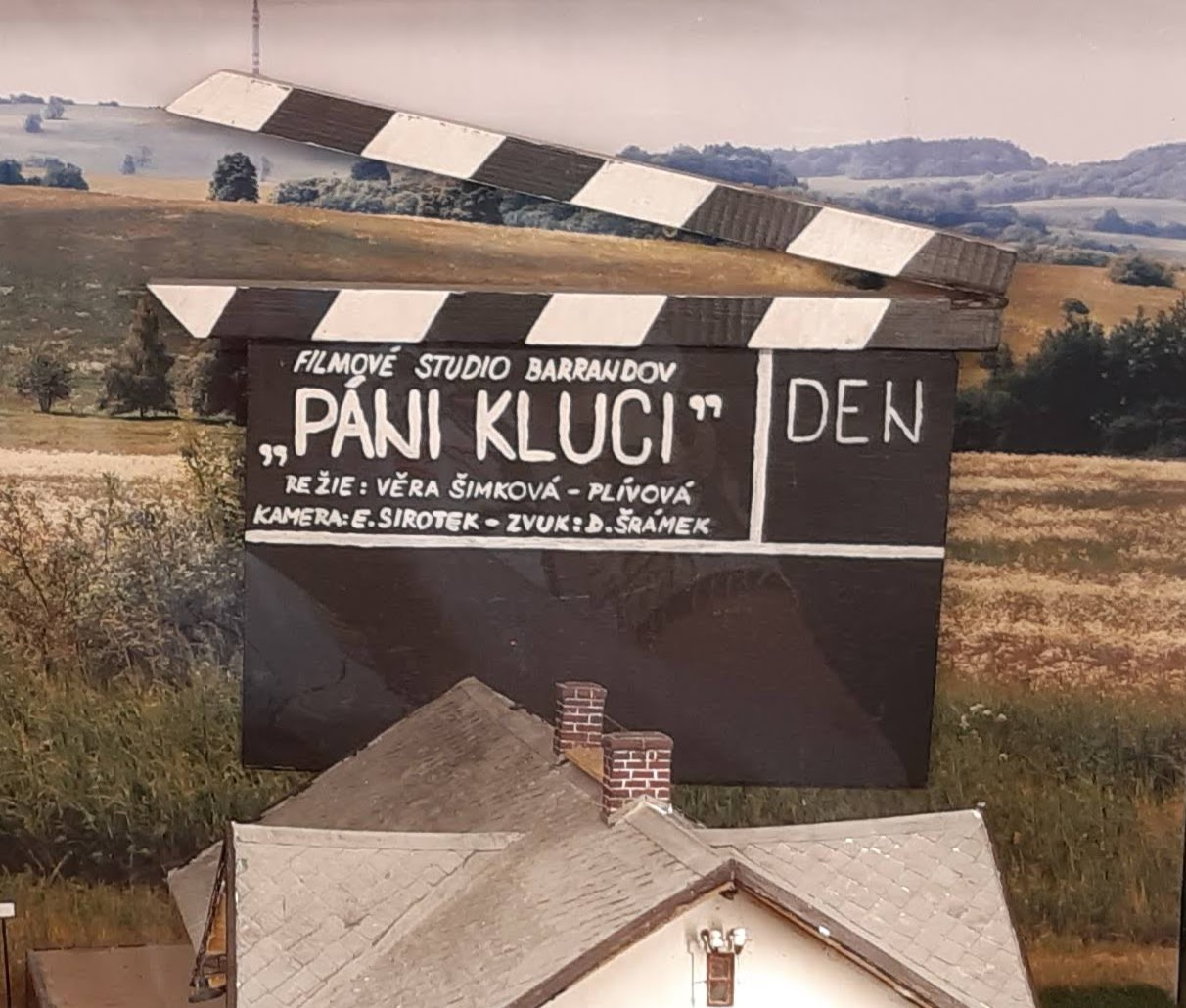
A clip from the film in the Zubrnice Railway Museum

Páni kluci is a 1976 Czech adventure film based on The Adventures of Tom Sawyer by Mark Twain.

== Plot ==
Tomáš is a young mischievous boy living with his uncle Václav and aunt Apolena. Tomáš is determined to win the heart of his crush, Blanka, by attempting to win a book of Old Bohemian Legends, which is their school’s best pupil. To win, students must collect commendation slips for good behavior. Knowing his own record is poor, Tomáš begins trading favors and services with other boys such as Hubert and Jožka to obtain their slips. When he still falls short, Tomáš and his friends break into the principal’s office to steal a larger supply. At a school ceremony, Tomáš is celebrated for having the most slips, but is found out, and in fear of getting punished by the school and by his aunt, Tomáš and his friends fake their deaths and run away to Pokštejn Castle to camp. While in the castle, they find out that criminals Ležatka, Pajdák, and Petr, who have just used dynamite to rob the town’s savings bank and hidden their loot in the castle. While exploring the castle, they find the hidden loot, and go back to town to return it during their own funerals, for the townspeople think they have drowned. The boys are forgiven for their pranks, the police catches and arrests Ležatka, Pajdák, and Petr, and the boys become town heroes for their returning of the loot. Tomáš end up winning the heart of Blanka as she eventually forgives him and kisses him.

== Cast ==
- Michael Dymek - Tomáš
- Petr Voříšek - Hubert
- Petr Stary - Jožka Vágner
- Magdalena Reifová - Blanka
- Iva Janžurová - aunt Apolena
