= Tom Sawyer =

Titular character of The Adventures of Tom Sawyer by Mark Twain

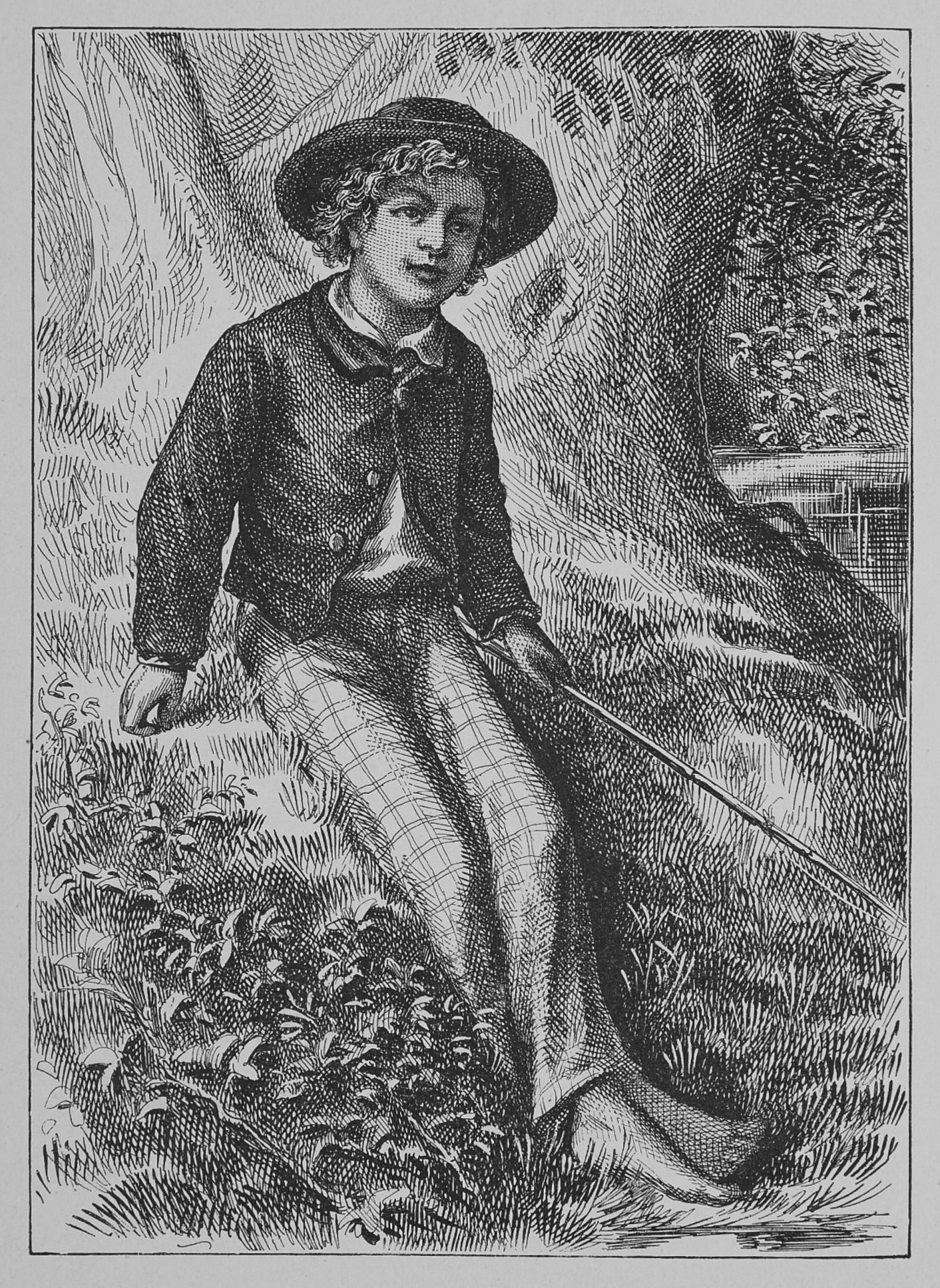
- 1876 illustration by True Williams
- First appearance: The Adventures of Tom Sawyer
- Last appearance: Tom Sawyer, Detective
- Created by: Mark Twain

In-universe information
- Family: Aunt Polly (aunt); Sally Phelps (aunt); Mary (cousin); Sid (younger half-brother)

Thomas "Tom" Sawyer (/ˈsɔː.jər/) is the title character of the Mark Twain novel The Adventures of Tom Sawyer (1876). He appears in three other novels by Twain: Adventures of Huckleberry Finn (1884), Tom Sawyer Abroad (1894), and Tom Sawyer, Detective (1896). He is around 12 to 13 years old.

Sawyer also appears in at least three unfinished Twain works, Huck and Tom Among the Indians, Schoolhouse Hill, and Tom Sawyer's Conspiracy. While all three uncompleted works were posthumously published, only Tom Sawyer's Conspiracy has a complete plot, as Twain abandoned the other two works after finishing only a few chapters. It is set in the 1840s along the Mississippi.

== Inspiration ==
The fictional character's name may have been derived from a jolly and flamboyant chief named Tom Sawyer, with whom Twain was acquainted in San Francisco, California, while Twain was employed as a reporter at The San Francisco Call. Twain used to listen to Sawyer tell stories of his youth: "Sam, he would listen to these pranks of mine with great interest and he'd occasionally take 'em down in his notebook. One day he says to me: 'I am going to put you between the covers of a book some of these days, Tom.' 'Go ahead, Sam,' I said, 'but don't disgrace my name.'" Twain himself said the character sprang from three people, later identified as: John B. Briggs (who died in 1907), William Bowen (who died in 1893), and himself. However, Twain later changed his story saying Sawyer was fully formed solely from his imagination, but Robert Graysmith said, "The great appropriator liked to pretend his characters sprang fully grown from his fertile mind."

== Personality ==
Tom Sawyer is mischievous and sometimes gets himself and his friends into trouble. He is also superstitious but he actually has a pure heart. "Although unthinking, he is not really a bad boy; he is capable of generosity and occasionally surprises even himself with magnanimous acts."

== Portrayals ==
Actors who have portrayed Tom Sawyer in films and TV:

Name	Date	Notes
Jack Pickford	1917	Film, Tom Sawyer
Gordon Griffith	1920	Film, Huckleberry Finn
Jackie Coogan	1930, 1931	Films, Tom Sawyer, Huckleberry Finn
Tommy Kelly	1938	Film, The Adventures of Tom Sawyer
Billy Cook	1938	Film, Tom Sawyer, Detective
Michael Miller	1944	Film, The Adventures of Mark Twain
Robert Hyatt	1955	Film, The Adventures of Huckleberry Finn
John Sharpe	1956	TV musical, Tom Sawyer
Fred Smith	1960	TV series, The Adventures of Tom Sawyer
Kevin Schultz	1968	TV series, The New Adventures of Huckleberry Finn
Roland Demongeot	1968	Romanian/French/German TV series Les Aventures de Tom Sawyer/Tom Sawyers und Huckleberry Finns Abenteuer
Johnny Whitaker	1973	Film, Tom Sawyer
Don Most	1975	Film, Huckleberry Finn
Sam Snyders	1979	TV series, Huckleberry Finn and His Friends
Patrick Creadon	1981	TV film, Rascals and Robbers: The Secret Adventures of Tom Sawyer and Huckleberry Finn
Fyodor Stukov	1981	Soviet three-episode TV miniseries, The Adventures of Tom Sawyer and Huckleberry Finn
Chris Ritchie	1985	Film, The Adventures of Mark Twain
Eugene Oakes	1986	TV series, American Playhouse Series 5: Adventures of Huckleberry Finn parts I, II, III and IV
Raphael Sbarge	1990	TV film, Back to Hannibal: The Return of Tom Sawyer and Huckleberry Finn
Jonathan Taylor Thomas	1995	Film, Tom and Huck
Rhett Akins	2000	Voice, animated musical film, Tom Sawyer
Grey Griffin	2003	Voice, animated TV series, The Fairly OddParents
Shane West	2003	Film, The League of Extraordinary Gentlemen
Louis Hofmann	2011, 2012	Film, Tom Sawyer), Die Abenteuer des Huck Finn
Joel Courtney	2014	Film, Tom Sawyer & Huckleberry Finn
Adam Nee	2015	Film, Band of Robbers
Jeremy Shada	2015	3DS game, Code Name: S.T.E.A.M.
Reilly Jacob	2016	TV series, Once Upon a Time
Seth Green	2016	TV series, Family Guy
