= Tom and Huck =

- Theatrical release poster
- Directed by: Peter Hewitt
- Screenplay by: Stephen Sommers; David Loughery
- Based on: The Adventures of Tom Sawyer by Mark Twain
- Produced by: Laurence Mark; John Baldecchi
- Starring: Jonathan Taylor Thomas; Brad Renfro
- Cinematography: Bobby Bukowski
- Edited by: David Freeman
- Music by: Stephen Endelman
- Production company: Walt Disney Pictures
- Distributed by: Buena Vista Pictures Distribution
- Release date: December 22, 1995
- Running time: 92 minutes
- Country: United States
- Language: English
- Box office: $23.9 million (US)

Tom and Huck is a 1995 American adventure comedy-drama film based on Mark Twain's 1876 novel The Adventures of Tom Sawyer, and starring Jonathan Taylor Thomas and Brad Renfro. The film was directed by Peter Hewitt and produced/co-written by Stephen Sommers (who also worked on Disney's adaptation of Twain's 1884 novel, 1993's The Adventures of Huck Finn). The film was released in North America on December 22, 1995.

In the film, mischievous young Tom Sawyer witnesses a murder by a vicious half-Native American criminal known as "Injun Joe". Tom befriends Huck Finn, a boy with no future and no family, and is forced to choose between honoring a friendship or honoring an oath, when the town drunk is accused of the murder.

== Plot ==
One dark stormy night, Native American Injun Joe goes to meet Dr. Jonas Robinson for some criminal activity. Meanwhile, a boy named Tom Sawyer runs away from home with his friends to work on steamboats. This ultimately fails as their raft collides on a rock in the Mississippi River, throwing Tom into the water. His friends find him washed up on the shore, and Tom finds it was Huckleberry "Huck" Finn who carried him to safety. Tom later meets Huck discovering an unusual way to remove warts - by taking a dead cat to the graveyard at night. There, they witness Injun Joe and Muff Potter, the town drunk, digging up the grave of Vic "One-Eyed" Murrell for Robinson. A treasure map is discovered and Robinson assaults Muff and Injun Joe in an attempt to take it for himself. He manages to knock out Muff, but Injun Joe fights back by fatally stabbing Doc with Muff's knife.

The next morning, Muff is charged for the murder. Tom and Huck had signed an oath saying that if either of them came forward about it, they would drop dead and rot. The boys embark on a search for the treasure map Injun Joe has, so they can declare Muff innocent while preserving their oath. Eventually, however, Injun Joe finds the lost treasure and asks his partner Emmett to hide it in a cave before burning the map. With the only evidence to prove Muff's innocence destroyed, Tom and Huck's friendship starts to decline, and Huck eventually leaves Hannibal. Injun Joe then discovers that Tom was a witness to the crime. He finds Tom and threatens he will kill him if he ever tells anyone about the murder.

At Muff’s trial, Tom decides that his friendship with Muff is more important than his oath with Huck and exposes the truth. Injun Joe unsuccessfully attempts to kill Tom before leaving Hannibal. The townspeople declare Tom as a hero for his bravery and plans to throw a festival to commemorate the occasion. Knowing that Injun Joe wants him dead, Tom decides not to attend. Huck later sneaks into Tom's bedroom one night, criticizing Tom for breaking their oath before leaving town again.

The next day during the festival, a group of children, including Tom and his love interest Becky Thatcher, enter McDougal's Cave, where Tom and Becky become lost. Meanwhile, the judge is alerted by the sheriff that Injun Joe ended up killing Emmett. Huck, who secretly attends the festival, overhears all this and goes after Tom. Eventually Tom and Becky stumble upon Injun Joe in the cave. He traps them, but they manage to escape and later discover the spot where Injun Joe hid the treasure. Tom then finds an opening in the cave and asks Becky to go get her father.

Injun Joe ultimately finds Tom and attempts to kill him before Huck suddenly shows up. After a brief struggle, Injun Joe easily overpowers Huck. Just as he is about to land a finishing blow, Tom quietly empties the contents from the treasure chest and threatens him by throwing the chest over a chasm. Injun Joe tries to get the chest from Tom, only to fall into the chasm to his death. The boys reconcile as they claim the treasure and are declared heroes by the people. Tom is praised on the front page of the newspaper, and Widow Douglas adopts Huck.

== Cast ==
- Jonathan Taylor Thomas as Thomas "Tom" Sawyer
- Brad Renfro as Huckleberry "Huck" Finn
- Eric Schweig as Injun Joe
- Charles Rocket as Judge Thatcher: Becky's father
- Amy Wright as Aunt Polly: Tom's maternal aunt
- Mike McShane as Muff Potter
- Marian Seldes as Widow Douglas: Huck's adoptive mother
- Rachael Leigh Cook as Rebecca "Becky" Thatcher: Tom's love interest
- Lanny Flaherty as Emmett: Injun Joe's accomplice.
- Courtland Mead as Sid Sawyer: Tom's younger brother
- Peter MacKenzie as Mr. Sneed
- Joey Stinson as Joseph "Joe" Harper
- Blake Heron as Benjamin "Ben" Rodgers
- Heath Lamberts as Mr. Dobbins
- William Newman as Doctor Jonas Robinson
- Andy Stahl as Sheriff
- Bronwen Murray as Cousin Mary: Tom's maternal cousin

== Reception ==
=== Box office ===
In its opening weekend, the film grossed $3,210,458 in 1,609 theaters in the United States and Canada, debuting at number 9 at the box office. In its second week it rose to No. 8 where it grossed $6,789,871. The U.S. and Canada box office for Tom and Huck was $23,920,048.

=== Critical ===
The film received mixed to negative reviews. On review aggregator Rotten Tomatoes, 25% of eight critics reviewed the film positively, with an average rating of 4.2/10, earning the film a score of "Rotten".

=== Accolades ===
Awards
Group	Category	Recipient(s)	Outcome
First Americans in the Arts	Outstanding Performance by an Actor in a Supporting Role (Film)	Eric Schweig	Won
Nickelodeon Kids' Choice Awards	Favorite Movie Actor	Jonathan Taylor Thomas	Nominated
Young Artist Awards	Best Young Leading Actor - Feature Film	Jonathan Taylor Thomas	Nominated
YoungStar Awards	Best Performance by a Young Actor in a Comedy Film	Jonathan Taylor Thomas	Nominated
YoungStar Awards	Best Performance by a Young Actor in a Comedy Film	Brad Renfro	Nominated
YoungStar Awards	Best Performance by a Young Actress in a Comedy Film	Rachael Leigh Cook	Nominated

== Home media ==
The film was released on VHS and LaserDisc on May 1, 1996. It was first released on DVD on May 6, 2003, and on February 10, 2009 was released as a double feature with The Adventures of Huck Finn (1993). The film was released on Blu-Ray on July 13, 2021. It is also included on Disney's streaming service, Disney+.

== See also ==
- The Adventures of Huck Finn (1993) – Disney's previous Twain adaptation, also worked on by Sommers, and starring Elijah Wood, Courtney B. Vance and Jason Robards.
