= Tom Sawyer, Detective =

1896 novel by Mark Twain

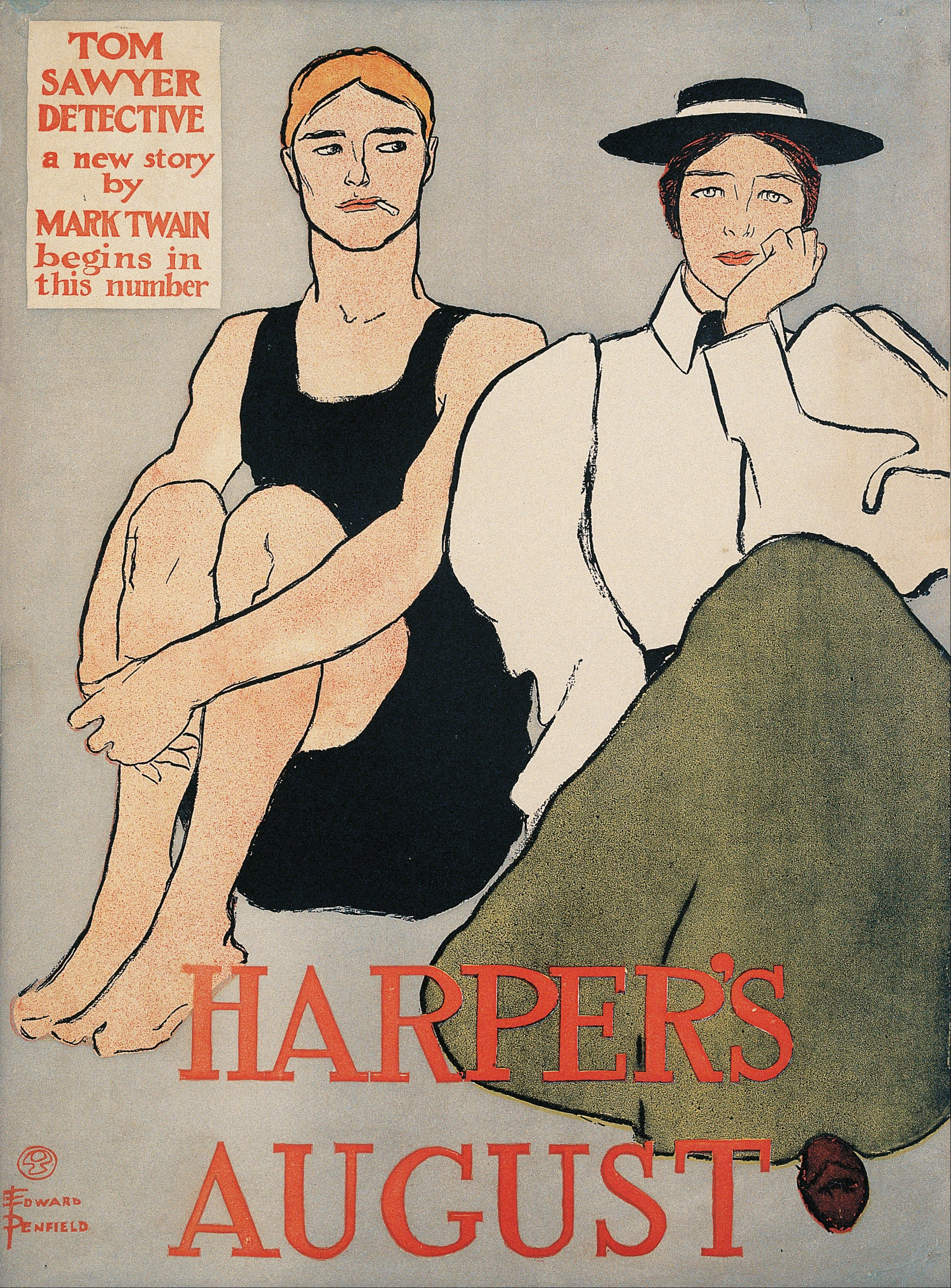
- Harper's Magazine poster by Edward Penfield for the debut of Tom Sawyer, Detective (August 1896)
- Author: Mark Twain
- Illustrator: A.B. Frost
- Language: English
- Series: Tom Sawyer
- Genre: Detective fiction
- Publisher: Harper Brothers
- Publication date: 1896
- Publication place: United States
- Media type: Print
- Preceded by: Tom Sawyer Abroad
- Text: Tom Sawyer, Detective at Wikisource

Tom Sawyer, Detective is an 1896 novella by Mark Twain and a sequel to Adventures of Huckleberry Finn (1884–1885). Published after Tom Sawyer Abroad (1894), it is the fourth completed work featuring Tom Sawyer and Huckleberry Finn. Tom Sawyer attempts to solve a mysterious murder in this burlesque of the immensely popular detective novels of the time. Like Adventures of Huckleberry Finn, the story is told using the first-person narrative voice of Huck Finn. It was first published in the August and September 1896 issues of Harper's New Monthly Magazine, illustrated by A. B. Frost, and first appeared in book form that November in the Harper & Brothers collection Tom Sawyer Abroad; Tom Sawyer, Detective and Other Stories.

== Film adaptations ==
- In 1938, the novel was made into a film directed by Louis King, starring Billy Cook as Tom and Donald O'Connor as Huckleberry Finn.
- A similar incarnation of Tom Sawyer appeared in the film version of The League of Extraordinary Gentlemen, set three years after the publication of this novel. In this film, Tom works for the United States Secret Service, and in the novelization of the film, Sawyer mentions that he once worked as a detective.

== Plagiarism accusation ==
In 1909, Danish schoolmaster Valdemar Thoresen claimed, in an article in the magazine Maaneds, that the plot of the book had been plagiarized from Steen Blicher's story The Rector of Veilbye. Blicher's work had been translated into German, but not into English, and Twain's secretary wrote Mr. Thoresen a letter, stating, "Mr. Clemens is not familiar with Danish and does not read German fluently, and has not read the book you mention, nor any translation or adaptation of it that he is aware of. The matter constituting 'Tom Sawyer, Detective,' is original with Mr. Clemens, who has never been consciously a plagiarist."

Tom Sawyer, Detective, like Bilcher's 1829 novel, is based on the 1626 trial of Pastor Søren Jensen Quist of Vejlby, as stated in an opening note preceding the first chapter of Detective (as republished by Gutenberg Press). The author states:

Note: Strange as the incidents of this story are, they are not inventions, but facts—even to the public confession of the accused. I take them from an old-time Swedish criminal trial, change the actors, and transfer the scenes to America. I have added some details, but only a couple of them are important ones. — M. T.

== See also ==
- Mark Twain bibliography
