= Making the Move =

2014 American play

- Original language: English
- Written by: Noah Altshuler
- Characters: Hannah; Connor; Charlotte; Stan
- Genre: Romantic Comedy, Short form
- Setting: A sofa at a high school

Premiere
- Date: August 6, 2014
- Place: Just the Tonic; Edinburgh Festival Fringe
- Official website

Making the Move is a 2014 play written by American playwright Noah Altshuler. Altshuler's first published work, the play premièred at the 2014 Edinburgh Festival Fringe.

== Synopsis ==
The play focuses on Connor and Hannah, two teenagers who brainstorm with their best friends, Stan and Charlotte, ways to seduce the other on a first date. The play is a comedic exploration of the complicated world of teenage friendships, love, and friend zones.

The one-act play is set on a single sofa and parallel dialogs to set up a first date and a first kiss. Using three dialogs (one dialog occurring during the date, and one between the boyfriend and his best friend, and one dialog with the girlfriend and her best friend), the play progresses from planning to the actual date.

== Characters ==
- Connor: A teenage boy strategizing how to land the first kiss during his first date with Hannah
- Hannah: A teenage girl contemplating her own moves in case Connor doesn't kiss her on the date
- Stan: Connor's best friend and provider of advice to Connor
- Charlotte: Hannah's best friend and provider of advice to Hannah

== Production history ==
Making the Move premiered at the Edinburgh Festival Fringe on August 6, 2014. Playwright Noah Altshuler was only 16 when he wrote the script and, at 17 during the 2014 Edinburgh Festival Fringe, was the youngest playwright in the festival. The play received 4 stars (out of 5) from Edinburgh Guide which wrote that the play provided the "magic of finding a little gem off the mainstream that feels like the Fringe at its truest – fresh and experimental, rather than already commercially viable." Critically, it was deemed an "adorable little show" and a "surprisingly amusing snapshot into the teenage psyche."

Making the Move premiered in the US at Florence High School in November 2014 and over 50 high schools in 20 states have licensed the play for production during the 2014–2015 academic year.

Productions during the 2014-2015 year include:

- Florence High School (Mississippi) – Florence, Mississippi
- Norcross High School – Norcross, Georgia
- John A. Ferguson High School – Miami, Florida
- Eau Claire High School – Columbia, South Carolina
- Canfield High School – Canfield, Ohio
- Armada High School – Armada, Michigan
- Romeo High School – Romeo, Michigan
- Apex High School – Apex, North Carolina
- Nathan Hale High School (Wisconsin) – West Allis, Wisconsin
- General William Mitchell High School (Colorado) – Colorado Springs, Colorado
- Mission Viejo High School – Mission Viejo, California
- Katella High School – Anaheim, California
- Golden Valley High School – Bakersfield, California
- Merced & Golden Valley High Schools – Merced, California
- Johansen High School – Modesto, California
- Cascade High School – Turner, Oregon
- Olympia High School – Olympia, Washington
- Clarksburg High School – Clarksburg, Maryland

== Use in drama contests ==
Making the Move has been used in state and regional drama contests. In December 2014, Gulfport High School performed Making the Move at the South Mississippi High School Drama Festival at the University of Southern Mississippi. Two of the actors were named to the All-star cast. The play was performed in spring 2015 state contests in four states.

== Edinburgh 2015 ==
Noah Altshuler wrote a follow up to Making the Move, Last Call for Providence, that premiered at the 2015 Edinburgh Festival Fringe at Just the Tonic. The production team is based in London.
