= Tom Sawyer Abroad =

1894 novel by Mark Twain

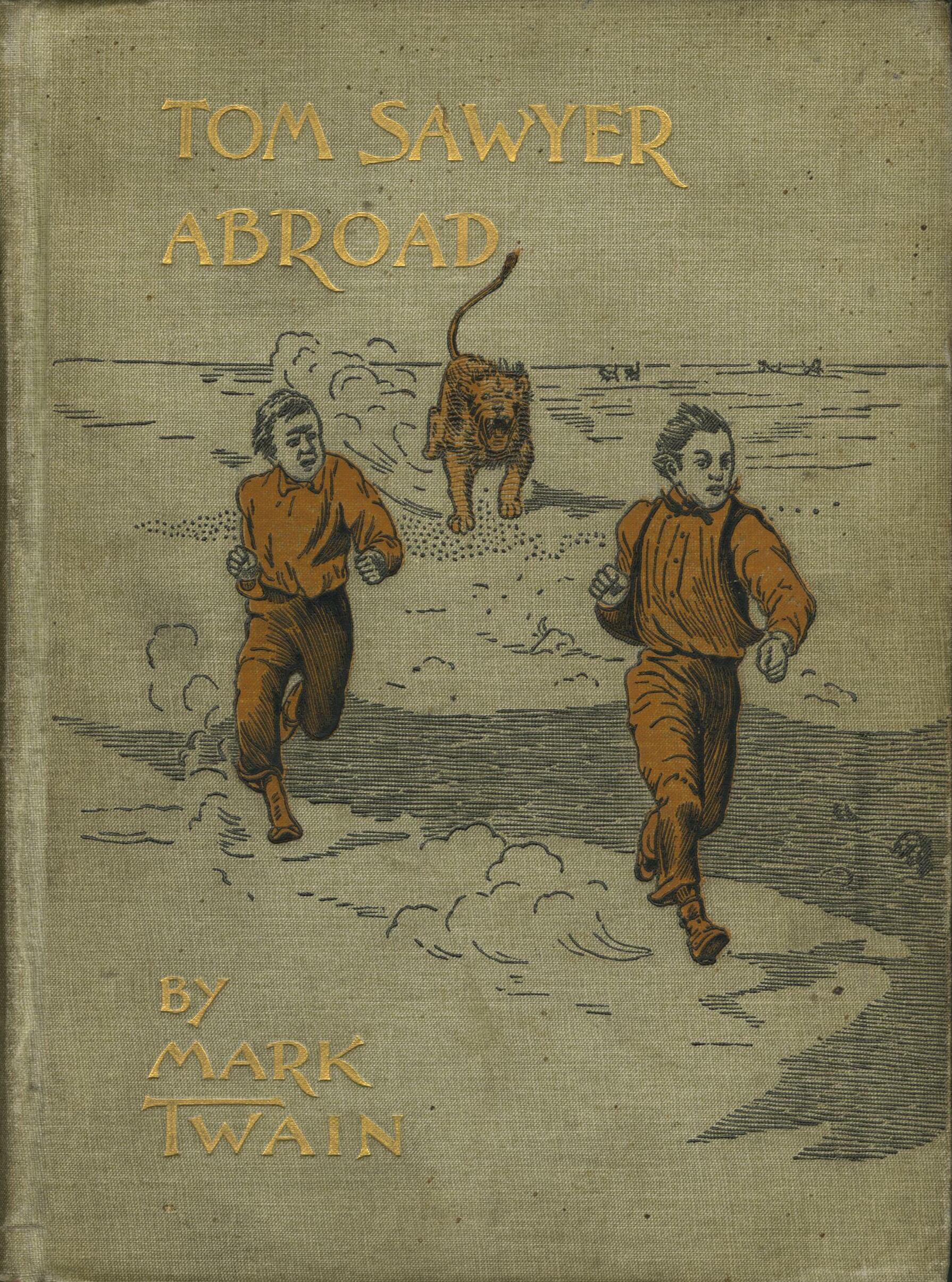
- First edition cover
- Author: Mark Twain
- Illustrator: Dan Beard
- Language: English
- Genre: Novel
- Publisher: Charles L. Webster & Co.
- Publication date: 1894
- Publication place: United States
- Media type: Print
- Preceded by: Adventures of Huckleberry Finn
- Followed by: Tom Sawyer, Detective
- Text: Tom Sawyer Abroad at Wikisource

Tom Sawyer Abroad is a novel by Mark Twain published in 1894. It features Tom Sawyer and Huckleberry Finn in a parody of adventure stories like those of Jules Verne.

== Plot ==
Set in the aftermath of Adventures of Huckleberry Finn, the story begins with Tom and Huck feeling restless after a quiet period of time that has been free of adventures. Tom develops a rivalry with a local postmaster, Nat Parsons, who has a "reputation for being a traveler," and Tom feels the need to one-up Parsons.

Out of competitiveness, Tom convinces Huck and Jim to follow Nat Parsons to see a futuristic hot air balloon whose owner plans to set sail for Europe in his ship. The three characters accidentally stow away on the balloon, and travel with the ship's owner, "the professor". During a storm, the professor tries to throw Tom overboard, but accidentally falls overboard himself; afterwards, the trio of Tom, Huck, and Jim continue their voyage without the maniacal professor onboard.

Though aiming for Europe, they inadvertently travel to Africa instead, surviving encounters with lions, robbers, and fleas to see some of the world's greatest wonders, including the Pyramids and the Sphinx. However, after damaging his beloved corn-cob pipe, Tom sends Jim back to Missouri to fetch a replacement corn-cob pipe and deliver a letter (from "Tom Sawyer the Errornort") to Aunt Polly. Jim departs for home; meanwhile, Tom and Huck camp out at Mount Sinai in Egypt. Days later, when Jim returns from his visit to St. Petersburg, he relays a message from Aunt Polly that Tom needs to return home. Begrudgingly, the boys depart for the United States.

Like Adventures of Huckleberry Finn and Tom Sawyer, Detective, the story is told using the first-person narrative voice of Huck Finn. The distinct dialects of Tom, Huck, and Jim are spelled phonetically; all three frequently mispronounce words.

== See also ==
- Mark Twain bibliography
- List of characters in the Tom Sawyer series
- Five Weeks in a Balloon by Jules Verne
