= List of Tom Sawyer characters =

Mark Twain's series of books featuring the fictional characters Tom Sawyer and Huckleberry Finn include:

1. The Adventures of Tom Sawyer (1876)
2. Adventures of Huckleberry Finn (1884)
3. Tom Sawyer Abroad (1894)
4. Tom Sawyer, Detective (1896)

== Tom Sawyer ==
Thomas "Tom" Sawyer, based on the young Samuel Clemens, is a cunning and playful boy of unspecified (although he loses one of his upper front teeth in the story) years of age, and the protagonist of the story. His best friends include Joe Harper and Huckleberry Finn. He has a half-brother, Sid Sawyer, a cousin, Mary, and an Aunt Polly, the sister of his dead mother. He lives with them in the town of St. Petersburg, Missouri. Also, he has another aunt, Sally Phelps, who lives considerably farther down the Mississippi River, in the town of Pikesville. Tom loves to go on adventures and wants to become a Native American, a pirate, or a circus clown. He fell in love with his classmate Becky Thatcher and was once "engaged" to Amy Lawrence. Tom is imaginative and obsessed with stories. Despite his mischief, Tom is good-hearted and has an active moral code as well; he develops deeper thinking and a more intellectually-mature outlook on life throughout the stories.

== Tom's relatives ==
=== Aunt Polly ===
Tom's aunt, the sister of his dead mother. Tom and Sid live with Aunt Polly and Cousin Mary. She does at first seem a bit controlling and abusive, but in spite of the relentless discipline and spiritual guidance she dispenses, she comes off as a caring, noble character. When Tom points out that nobody seems to care about Huck's being alive after they were both presumed dead, Aunt Polly generously gives her love to Huck as well, saying, "And so they shall. I'm glad to see him, poor motherless thing!" and the "loving attentions Aunt Polly lavished upon him were the one thing capable of making him more uncomfortable than he was before". In fact, the last impression we get of Aunt Polly is of a similar nature: "There was something about Aunt Polly's manner when she kissed Tom, that swept away his low spirits and made him lighthearted and happy again". She is a very bright woman and she deeply cares about Tom, Sid, Mary, and—eventually—Huck. She always falls for Tom's pranks but is always able to laugh at herself when she realizes how perpetually gullible she is; she also gradually develops a greater realization of Tom's true character and a deeper sense of respect for him when he performs unexpected acts of caring and conscience.

=== Mary ===
She is identified as Tom's cousin, but her relationship to others in the household is never precisely defined. She is gentle and good-natured and has great patience with Tom despite his tricks. It is unsaid whether or not she is older than the siblings, but due to her mature personality and nurturing ways we are led to believe she is considerably older.

=== Sid Sawyer ===
Tom's whiny half-brother, who also lives with Aunt Polly and Mary. He behaves well but enjoys getting Tom into trouble and tattling on him. He appears to be around nine years old. Sid's last name was not given until the second book, Adventures of Huckleberry Finn. It suggests that he and Tom had the same father, or perhaps a young Tom was given the name of Sid's father. Sid does not necessarily have a blood relationship with Aunt Polly. In either case, it would be consistent with her character to open her home to the boy and keep the brothers together.

=== Sally and Silas Phelps ===
Tom's other aunt, Sally Phelps, lives considerably farther down the Mississippi River, in the town of Pikesville. She is married to Silas Phelps. Like her sister Polly, Sally rules her roost with a firm hand, but she always means well, and is similarly kind and lovingly caring.

== Other characters ==
=== Huckleberry Finn ===
Huckleberry "Huck" Finn is the protagonist and narrator of Adventures of Huckleberry Finn, Tom Sawyer Abroad, and Tom Sawyer, Detective. Huck is one of Tom's best friends. After The Adventures of Tom Sawyer, Huck describes his own adventure in Adventures of Huckleberry Finn, including how he escapes from his drunken, abusive father, and how he met Jim, the runaway slave. Like Tom, Huck often engages in somewhat unruly behavior, but in reality he has a very kind heart and a deeply caring personality, sometimes displaying even stronger morals than he himself realizes. He also progressively matures morally and intellectually throughout the stories, just as Tom does.

=== Pap Finn ===
Huck's abusive, drunken father. He had vanished prior to the beginning of Adventures of Huckleberry Finn but shows up at the beginning of that story and forcibly takes his son to live with him. He also tries to sue Judge Thatcher to get the six thousand dollars Huck had given the Judge for safekeeping, and confiscates whatever money Huck has in his pocket, using it to get drunk. He is infuriated that his son would try to amount to more than he did and live in better conditions. He demands that Huck quit school, threatening him with whipping. Soon after Huck escapes, Pap Finn leaves to search for him and doesn't return. At the end of Adventures of Huckleberry Finn, Jim reveals to Huck that the corpse they found in the abandoned house early in the book was actually that of Huck's father. Pap Finn's backstory is explored in Finn: A Novel (2007), by Jon Clinch.

=== Joe Harper ===
Joseph "Joe" Harper is one of Tom's best friends. He joins Tom and Huck as a pirate when they run away from home to Jackson's Island. He makes a few other small appearances in the novel, including playing Robin Hood in the woods and getting caught not paying attention in class with Tom, and Joe also plays war with Tom. But he gradually disappears as the plot of the novel ensues. His mother is Sereny Harper and his sisters are Susan and Faith Harper. He is the first to get homesick while on the island with Tom and Huck.

=== Injun Joe ===
Joe is the primary antagonist in The Adventures of Tom Sawyer, and is described as a "half-breed", being mixed Native American and white. At Dr. Robinson's request, he, Muff Potter, and Robinson visit the town cemetery one night to steal a body from a grave. Injun Joe then kills Robinson to settle an old grudge and frames Potter for the crime, unaware that Tom and Huck have witnessed it. When the case comes to trial, Tom testifies on Potter's behalf and identifies Injun Joe as the actual killer, prompting Joe to flee the courtroom. He and another confederate later find a hoard of stolen gold and hide it in a cave, where Tom briefly encounters him while trying to find a way out with Becky Thatcher. After Tom and Becky escape the cave, Becky's father has it sealed; Injun Joe is later found just inside the entrance, having starved to death.

=== The Ragged Man ===
Injun Joe's partner in crime. The two use an abandoned house as a hideout and discover a chest of gold coins buried in one of its rooms, which they believe to be loot from robberies committed by John Murrell and his gang. About the time of Injun Joe's accidental death in the cave, the body of the "ragged man" is found near the town's water landing-after apparently drowning. His name was Emmett in Disney's 1995 film Tom and Huck.

=== Jim ===
Jim flees slavery with Huck, who was escaping his drunken father. Jim hopes to reach the free states and buy his family's freedom. He is polite and good-natured, and accompanies Huck throughout the story. At the end of the book, Tom reveals that his owner had died since they left home, and she had freed Jim in her will.

Another "colored boy" named Jim briefly appears in The Adventures of Tom Sawyer. This must be a different character, seemingly younger, and taking orders from Aunt Polly rather than Miss Watson.

=== "The King" and "the Duke" ===
Two con men whom Huck meets in his adventures down the Mississippi and the main antagonists of Adventures of Huckleberry Finn. They join Huck and Jim on the raft to escape an angry mob that was chasing them out of a town. The younger one initially claims to be the true heir of the Duke of Bridgewater, and the older one the lost son of Louis XVI and the rightful king of France. Thus, Huck refers to them as "the king" and "the duke" throughout the narration of the book. During their time in the story, they collaborate to stage many swindles, including pretending to be the brothers of a deceased man so they can steal his estate. They are later separated from Huck and Jim, tarred and feathered, and ridden out of town on a rail.

=== Amy Lawrence ===
Amy is Becky Thatcher's rival for most of The Adventures of Tom Sawyer, and dislikes Becky. Amy is Tom's first love, but is swept from his thoughts the moment he sees Becky. After a little slip-up from Tom, he returns to Amy to make Becky jealous.

=== Muff Potter ===
Muff Potter is a friendly fisherman who drinks heavily, loves children, and is a close friend of Tom and Huck. He often mends the children's kites and helps them fish. He and Injun Joe are hired by Dr. Robinson to dig up a grave one night in order to steal its corpse, but Joe kills Robinson and then convinces Potter that he himself committed the murder while drunk. Muff is then sent to jail for the accused murder of Dr. Robinson. Potter is tried for the crime, but Tom's eyewitness testimony results in his acquittal.

=== Dr. Robinson ===
The doctor who wanted the fresh grave dug up so that he could use the body for medical research. He was subsequently murdered by Injun Joe, who framed Muff Potter for the crime.

A different character of the same name in Adventures of Huckleberry Finn is the only person who perceives that the king and the duke are imposters posing as the brothers and heirs of recently departed Peter Wilks. He warns the Wilks nieces, but the grifters have already won their trust. Like the first book's "Dr. Robinson", he is involved in exhuming a corpse, but here the intention is merely to inspect the body for tattoos and then re-inter it, not to use it as a cadaver to perform experiments on.

=== Ben Rogers ===
Benjamin "Ben" Rogers is another child, Tom's age. In chapter 2, Tom convinces Ben to whitewash the fence for him. Ben gives Tom an apple for that privilege. Tom wants Ben to be in his crew of robbers.

=== Becky Thatcher ===
Rebecca "Becky" Thatcher is Judge Thatcher's daughter, known for being Tom's girlfriend. Her long blonde hair is always worn in braids. She wins Tom's love from the first moment he sees her. When she first encounters Tom, she gives him a purple pansy to show her love. She soon becomes engaged to him by swearing to love only him and sealing their engagement with a kiss. When he mentions that he used to be with Amy Lawrence, Becky believes that he still loves Amy and gets angry at him. After Becky accidentally tears a page in the teacher's anatomy book, Tom claims responsibility and takes the punishment she would have received, winning her affections again. The two become lost in a cave for several days after wandering away from a school picnic, but Tom eventually finds a way out and they soon return to full health.

In Huckleberry Finn she is also referred to as "Bessie", perhaps Huck's mistake, as he does not know her well. Becky was based on Laura Hawkins, an actual friend of Samuel Clemens.

=== Widow Douglas ===
This wealthy middle-aged woman who extends her kindness to all the Lord's creatures, especially to those whom no one else will welcome. She takes Huckleberry Finn into her home, but her efforts to civilize him are frustrated.

=== Miss Watson ===
Miss Watson lives with her sister, the Widow Douglas, and is much more aggressive in trying to reform Huckleberry Finn. She is legal owner of Jim, and treats him harshly. She could realize a substantial profit in selling him to a New Orleans slave trader. For Jim it would mean a hard future and separation from his family. The Widow advises against it. Jim runs off before hearing her final decision. It is revealed during Huck and Jim's time away she had died and freed Jim in her will.

=== Judge Thatcher ===
Although Judge Thatcher plays a minor role in The Adventures of Tom Sawyer, he plays a substantial role in The Adventures of Huckleberry Finn. Judge Thatcher shares responsibility for Huckleberry Finn with the Widow Douglas, and it is to Judge Thatcher that Huckleberry Finn signs over his fortune in order to keep it from his father.

=== Mr. Dobbins ===
The hated schoolmaster at Tom's school, who has taken the job after failing to become a doctor. He is easily angered and is described as "short-tempered." He is a victim of a plot by his pupils, who secretly paint his bald head gold while he is napping and then use a cat to remove his toupee during a public display of his pupils' knowledge. When Becky Thatcher accidentally tears a page in Mr. Dobbins' anatomy book, Tom takes the blame and receives a spanking in her place, winning her admiration.
