= Carlos Davis (screenwriter) =

American screenwriter

Carlos Davis (born James Carlos Davis; October 11, 1948 – September 24, 2020) was an American screenwriter, film producer, playwright, and best selling novelist. He was best known for writing the 1991 cult comedy Drop Dead Fred, starring Rik Mayall and Phoebe Cates, and writing with the novelist James LePore the national best selling novel, No Dawn For Men.

Davis was living in Manhattan when he died.

== Early years ==
Davis was born in San Francisco, California, the son of Aida Ester Minamora (November 20, 1912 – September 23, 1993), an art collector and world traveler from Santa Ana, El Salvador who never became an American citizen, and James (June 22, 1911 – January 24, 1956), a San Francisco native who co-managed the Davis Hardwood Company—the first American company to import Philippine hardwood. He had a sister, Louisa Aida Davis (February 8, 1950 – March 21, 2020), who was also born in San Francisco. The Davis children were raised in San Francisco, New York City, and Europe. He is a descendant of Jacob Davis, the man who created denim jeans and sold the patent to Levi Strauss.

Davis attended Town School for Boys, The Allen-Stevenson School (New York City), Riverdale Country School (New York City), New York University's undergraduate program in Spain, London University, and Georgetown University (Washington, D.C.),

== Career ==
Preppies went on for 85 performances on Broadway. Preppies is the only American musical ever to have a future American President for an investor -- George W. Bush

He and the novelist James LePore, co-authored three successful novels. The first, No Dawn For Men which was published in December, 2013 and God's Formula, published in 2014. The first was a national best seller and a finalist of the International Thriller Writers Award. The third novel in the series, The Bone Keepers published in April, 2016. In 2018, he and Anthony Fingleton co-wrote and executive produced the heist thriller The Hurricane Heist (formerly Category 5). It was directed by Rob Cohen.

In late 2016, he and Kevin Armento wrote a screenplay for thriller titled Driven, about an Uber driver and is set in San Francisco. He was also working on a film, Betsy & Napoleon, a screenplay he wrote about Napoleon's time on St. Helena. It stars Daniel Auteuil and Sophie Lelisse. He was producing it with Fred Roos and Marcia Nasatir. He wrote a surfing comedy with his son, James, for a major studio release.

== Filmography ==
Year	Title	Role
2018	The Hurricane Heist	Screenwriter, Executive Producer
1991	Drop Dead Fred	Screenwriter, Executive Producer
1983	Preppies	Playwright, Producer
1982	Rascals and Robbers: The Secret Adventures of Tom Sawyer and Huck Finn	Screenwriter, Executive Producer

== Awards, nominations, and distinctions ==
Rascals and Robbers: The Secret Adventures of Tom Sawyer and Huck Finn was nominated for 3 Emmys, and it was the first major role for Anthony Michael Hall, Cynthia Nixon, and future filmmaker Patrick Creadon.

No Dawn For Men was a finalist for The International Thrillers Writers award.

Director Gregory Nava named a villainous character in his film El Norte Carlos, after Davis.
