= Bennye Gatteys =

American singer and actress (born 1940)

- Born: November 20, 1940 (age 85)
- Occupations: Actress; singer
- Years active: 1956—1989
- Known for: Days of Our Lives; The United States Steel Hour

Bennye Gatteys (born November 20, 1940) is an American singer and actress who appeared in many anthology television series and soap operas.

== Early life ==
Gatteys grew up in Dallas, Texas. The unusual spelling of her first name is because her parents wanted a boy.

At the age of two, she sang in her church's choir. By the age of eight she began studying piano and sought to become a concert pianist.

At age 15, visiting a friend in New York City, she appeared on a game show, Name That Tune, during which she won $19,000 after a series of appearances.

== Career ==
Gatteys' career in musical theater was jump-started when she was discovered at the age of 15 by Broadway producer Kermit Bloomgarden, who cast her in a production of The Diary of Anne Frank as the understudy of Susan Strasberg, who played Anne Frank.

Her first big break in television came at the age of 16, during her appearance in the television anthology series Look Up and Live, in which she co-starred opposite a then-teenaged Warren Beatty. During the short-lived series, Beatty and Gatteys formed a strong connection; Gatteys recalled Beatty walking her home from rehearsals and shoots and described him as her "big brother, friend, [and] companion". She helped him read for a starring role in the Broadway musical Ohio.

She eventually married a banker from Texas and returned to Dallas for seven years, during which time her career remained dormant. After her divorce, she moved to Los Angeles to restart her acting career in soap operas, including a starring role in Days of Our Lives as Susan Martin.

Her career continued largely in the field of theater, soap operas, and occasional variety and game shows, until she retired from show business in 1977. In 1980 she began a real estate career and was her office's top producer in 1983 and 1985.

== Partial filmography ==
- The United States Steel Hour (Tom Sawyer, 1956)
- Kraft Television Theatre (I Am Fifteen and Don't Want to Die, 1956)
- Captain Kangaroo (1959)
- Wagon Train (1961) S5.E12 - "The Bettina May Story" as Ginny
- Tales of Wells Fargo (1961) S6.E4 - "Death Raffle" as Jessamie
- The Many Loves of Dobie Gillis (1961) S3.E2 - "Dobie, Dobie, Who's Got Dobie?" as Phyllis
- Stoney Burke
- The Many Loves of Dobie Gillis (1962) S3.E36 - "The Frat's in the Fire" as Maribelle
- Straightaway (1962) — episode "Escape to Darkness" as Jill
- Laramie (1963) S4.E20 - "The Dispossessed" as Ellen
- Gunsmoke (1963) S8.E30 - "The Far Places" as Millie
- The Outer Limits (1963) S1.E21 - "The Children of Spider County" as Anna Bishop
- Days of Our Lives (1973–76) Episodes 1869 - 2740 as Susan Peters
- S.W.A.T. (1976) S2.E23 - "Soldier on the Hill" as Anne
- Emergency! (1976) S6 E3 "The Unlikely Heirs" as Cheryl
- Match Game '76 (1976)
- Baretta (1977) S3.E13 - "Don't Kill the Sparrows" as Janice
- Murphy's Law (1989) S1.E13 (Unaired) - "All's Wrong That Ends Wrong" as Mrs. Gottrocks
