= Billy Cook (actor) =

American actor (1928–1981)

William Cook (October 13, 1928 – June 19, 1981) was an American actor best known for his work as a child.

Cook was born in Menlo Park, New Jersey. His early acting experience came in plays directed by his mother. In films, he played the young version of characters acted by Ray Milland in Men with Wings (1938) and Beau Geste (1939). He died in Kennebunkport, Maine at age 52.

== Filmography ==
Year	Title	Role	Notes
1938	Men with Wings	Scott Barnes at Age 10	
1938	Sons of the Legion	David Lee	
1938	The Arkansas Traveler	kid	
1938	Tom Sawyer, Detective	Tom Sawyer	
1939	I'm from Missouri	farm boy	Uncredited
1939	Invitation to Happiness	Albert Cole Jr.	
1939	Beau Geste	John at age 10	
1939	Disputed Passage	Johnny Merkle	
1939	Gone with the Wind	Boy with Tears When Death Rolls Are Read	Uncredited
1940	The Blue Bird	Boy Chemist	
1940	I Was an Adventuress	bellboy	Uncredited
1941	Naval Academy	Dick Brewster	
1942	The Major and the Minor	cadet	Uncredited
