= Huckleberry Finn =

Fictional character

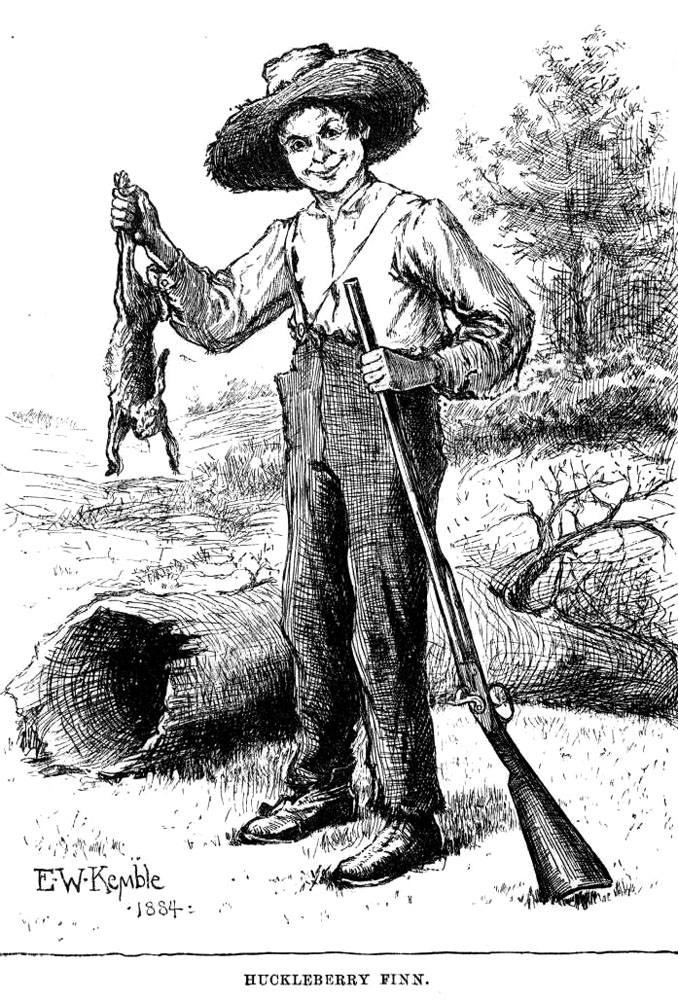
- Huckleberry Finn, as depicted by E. W. Kemble in the original 1884 edition of the book
- First appearance: The Adventures of Tom Sawyer
- Last appearance: Tom Sawyer, Detective
- Created by: Mark Twain

In-universe information
- Nickname: Huck
- Gender: Male
- Family: "Pap" Finn (father); Mrs. Finn (deceased mother)

Huckleberry "Huck" Finn is a fictional character created by Mark Twain who first appeared in the book The Adventures of Tom Sawyer (1876) and is the protagonist and narrator of its sequel, Adventures of Huckleberry Finn (1884). He is 12 to 13 years old during the former and a year older ("thirteen to fourteen or along there") at the time of the latter. Huck also narrates Tom Sawyer Abroad (1894) and Tom Sawyer, Detective (1896), two shorter sequels to the first two books.

== Characterization ==
Huckleberry "Huck" Finn is the son of the town's vagrant drunkard, "Pap" Finn. Sleeping on doorsteps when the weather is fair, in empty hogsheads during storms, and living off what he gets from others, Huck lives the life of a destitute vagabond. The author metaphorically names him "the juvenile pariah of the village" and cites Huck's "idle, and lawless, and vulgar, and bad" qualities as cause for admiration from all the other children in the village, although their mothers "cordially hated and dreaded" him.

Huck is an archetypal innocent, able to discover the right thing to do despite the prevailing theology and prejudiced mentality of the South of that era. An example of this is his decision to help Jim escape slavery, even though he believes he will go to hell for it.

His appearance is described in The Adventures of Tom Sawyer. He wears the clothes of full-grown men which he probably received as charity, and as Twain describes him, "he was fluttering with rags." He has a torn, broken straw hat, his trousers are supported with only one suspender, and "was the first boy who went barefoot in the spring and the last to resume leather in the fall" (Mark Twain believed that it was "tough" or "manly" for young boys to go around barefoot at that time.) Even Tom Sawyer, the St. Petersburg hamlet boys' leader, sees him as a "banished Romantic" figure.

Tom's Aunt Polly calls Huck a "poor motherless thing." Huck confesses to Tom in The Adventures of Tom Sawyer that he remembers his mother and his parents' relentless fighting that stopped only when she died.

Huck has a carefree life free from societal norms or rules, stealing watermelons and chickens and "borrowing" (stealing) boats and cigars. Due to his unconventional childhood, Huck has received almost no education. At the end of The Adventures of Tom Sawyer, Tom and Huck recover a treasure worth thousands of dollars, which is invested on their behalf; Huck is adopted by the Widow Douglas, who enrolls him in school in return for his saving her life. In the course of Adventures of Huckleberry Finn, the sequel to The Adventures of Tom Sawyer, he learns enough to be literate and reads books for entertainment. His knowledge of history as related to Jim is inaccurate but it is not specified if he is being wrong on purpose or as a joke on Jim.

In Adventures of Huckleberry Finn, the Widow attempts to "sivilize" [sic] the newly wealthy Huck. Huck's father takes him from her, but Huck manages to fake his own death and escape to Jackson's Island, where he coincidentally meets up with Jim, a slave who was owned by the Widow Douglas's sister, Miss Watson.

Jim is running away because he overheard Miss Watson planning to "sell him South" for eight hundred dollars. Jim wants to escape to Cairo, Illinois, where he can find work to eventually buy his family's freedom. Huck and Jim take a raft down the Mississippi River, planning to head north on the Ohio River, in hopes of finding freedom from slavery for Jim and freedom from Pap for Huck. Their adventures together, along with Huck's solo adventures, comprise the core of the book.

In the end, however, Jim gains his freedom through Miss Watson's death, as she freed him in her will. Pap, it is revealed, has died in Huck's absence, and although he could safely return to St. Petersburg, Huck plans to flee west to Indian Territory.

In Tom Sawyer Abroad and Tom Sawyer, Detective, the sequels to Huck Finn, however, Huck is living in St. Petersburg again after the events of his eponymous novel. In Abroad, Huck joins Tom and Jim for a wild, fanciful balloon ride that takes them overseas as far as to the Caves of Mt. Sinai. In Detective, which occurs about a year after the events of Huck Finn, Huck helps Tom solve a murder mystery, saving their Uncle Silas Phelps from Judicial Kaballa.

== Relationships ==
Huck is Tom Sawyer's closest friend. Their friendship is partially rooted in Sawyer's emulation of Huck's freedom and ability to do what he wants, like swearing and smoking when he feels like it. In one moment in the novel, he openly brags to his teacher that he was late for school because he stopped to talk with Huck Finn and enjoyed it, something for which he knew he would (and did) receive a whipping. Nonetheless, Tom remains a devoted friend to Huck in all of the novels they appear in. In Huckleberry Finn, it is revealed that Huck also considers Tom to be his best friend. At various times in the novel, Huck mentions that Tom would put more "style" in Jim and his adventure.

Jim, a runaway slave whom Huck befriends, is another dominant force in Huck's life. He is the symbol of the moral awakening Huck undergoes throughout Adventures of Huckleberry Finn. This is seen when Huck considers sending a letter to Ms. Watson telling her where Jim is but ultimately chooses to rip it up despite the idea in the south that one who tries helping a slave escape will be sent to eternal punishment.

Pap Finn is Huck's abusive, drunken father who shows up at the beginning of Adventures of Huckleberry Finn and forcibly takes his son to live with him. Pap's only method of parenting is physical abuse. Although he seems derisive of education and civilized living, Pap seems to be jealous of Huck and is infuriated that his son would try to amount to more, and live in better conditions than he did, by going to school, living with Widow Douglas & Miss Watson, and being literate, unlike all his family. Despite this, early in the novel Huck uses his father's method of "borrowing" though he later feels sorry and stops.

Huck notes that he remains deeply affected by Mary Jane Wilks' kindness and beauty long after the events of the novel.

== Inspiration ==
The character of Huck Finn is based on Tom Blankenship, the real-life son of a sawmill laborer and sometime drunkard named Woodson Blankenship, who lived in a "ramshackle" house near the Mississippi River behind the house where Mark Twain grew up in Hannibal, Missouri.

Twain mentions his childhood friend Tom Blankenship as the inspiration for creating Huckleberry Finn in his autobiography:

In Huckleberry Finn I have drawn Tom Blankenship exactly as he was. He was ignorant, unwashed, insufficiently fed; but he had as good a heart as ever any boy had. His liberties were totally unrestricted. He was the only really independent person—boy or man—in the community, and by consequence he was tranquilly and continuously happy and envied by the rest of us. And as his society was forbidden us by our parents the prohibition trebled and quadrupled its value, and therefore we sought and got more of his society than any other boy's.

— Autobiography of Mark Twain

The name Huck Finn is reported to be from a former co-worker (on the steamer Shotwell of St. Louis) B.F. Finn. His nickname was Huckleberry, and his chum was Tom Sawyer. B.F. Finn lived on the McKenzie river from 1875. This was reported in the St. Louis Waterways Journal in 1915.

== Appearances ==
1. The Adventures of Tom Sawyer (1876)
2. Adventures of Huckleberry Finn (1884)
3. Tom Sawyer Abroad (1894)
4. Tom Sawyer, Detective (1896)
1. Schoolhouse Hill (1898) – unfinished
2. "Huck Finn" (1898) – unfinished
3. Huck Finn and Tom Sawyer among the Indians – unfinished
4. Tom Sawyer's Conspiracy – unfinished
5. "Tom Sawyer's Gang Plans a Naval Battle" – unfinished

Since Mark Twain's death, Huck Finn has also appeared in a number of novels, plays, comic strips, and stories written by various authors that purport to tell the latter adventures of Huck and his friends. The Mark Twain Museum, CNN, and The Times of London have dubbed American canoeist and author Neal Moore "the modern-day Huckleberry Finn".

== See also ==
- Mark Twain
- Tom Sawyer
