= Jackie Searl =

American actor (1921–1991)

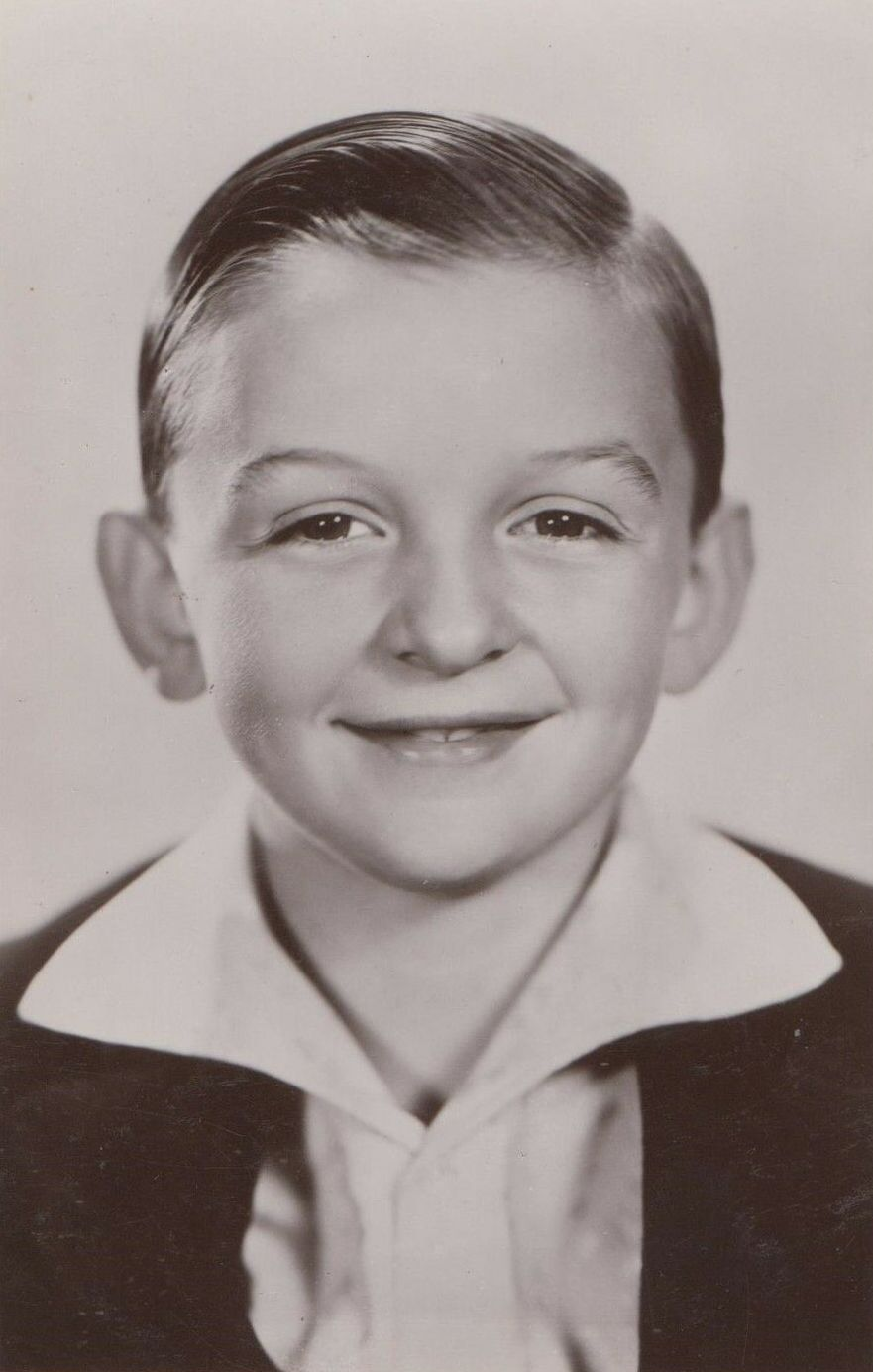
- Searl in the 1930s
- Born: John E. Searl; July 7, 1921; Anaheim, California, U.S.
- Died: April 29, 1991 (aged 69); Tujunga, Los Angeles, California, U.S.
- Other names: Jack Searle, Jackie Searle
- Occupation: Actor
- Years active: 1929–1969

John E. Searl (July 7, 1921 – April 29, 1991) was an American actor. He portrayed bratty kids in several films, and often had only small roles, such as "Robin Figg" in 1934's Strictly Dynamite.

== Early years ==
His name is sometimes written as Jackie Searle, and by 1960, he was billed as Jack Searl. As a child actor, he began performing on a local Los Angeles radio station at the age of three.

Searl served four years in the U.S. Army, primarily as a radio instructor, during World War II.

== Career ==
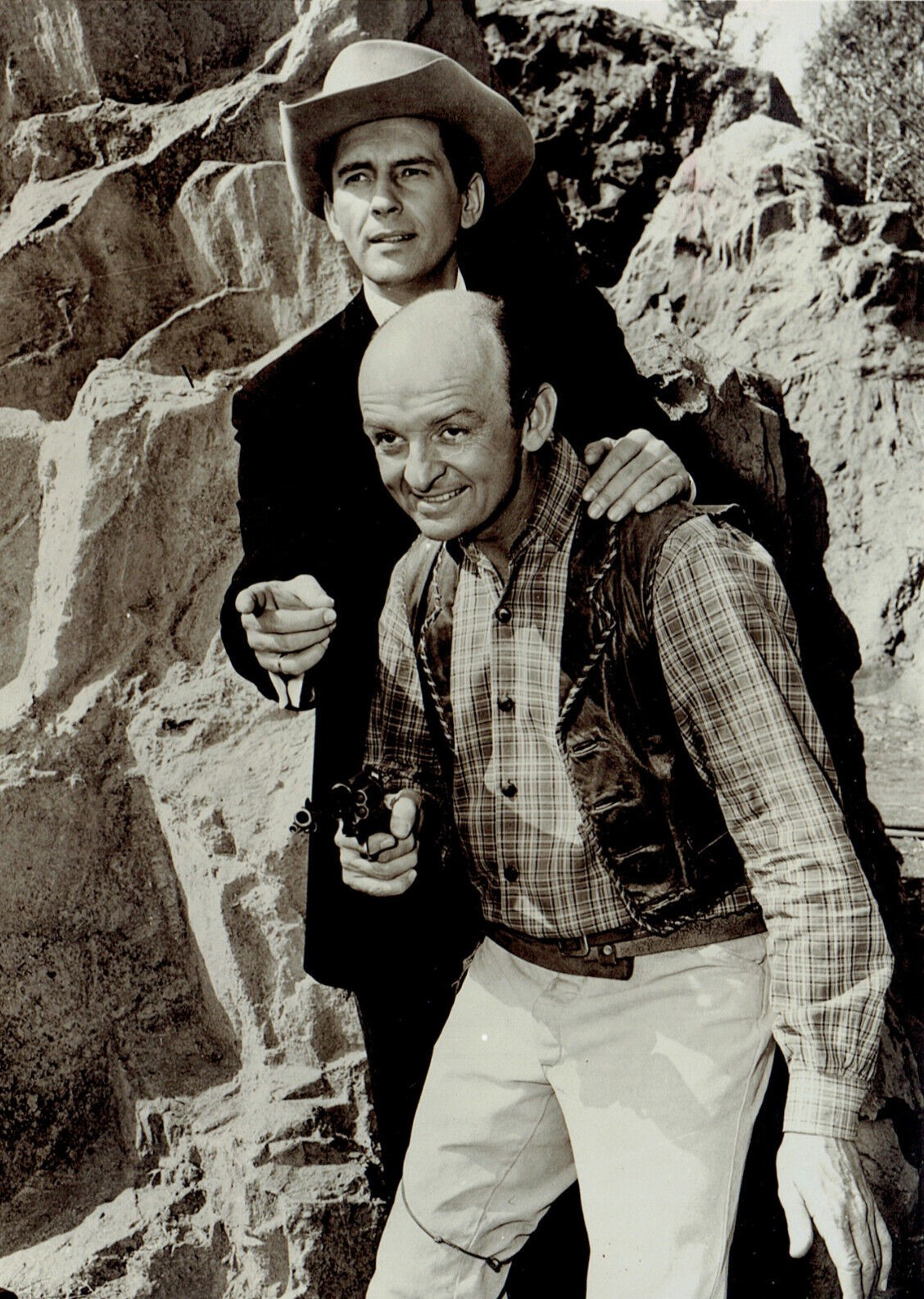
With Jack Kelly in Maverick

His first movie role was in Daughters of Desire (1929), followed by Tom Sawyer (1930) with Jackie Coogan and Mitzi Green, and Huckleberry Finn in 1931.

Notable films in which he appeared include Skippy, High Gear, Peck's Bad Boy, Great Expectations, and Little Lord Fauntleroy. In the 1940s, he had some supporting character roles before disappearing for nearly a decade. In the early 1960s, Searl enjoyed a flurry of activity as a supporting villain on television. For example, he appeared in the Perry Mason episode "The Case of the Traveling Treasure," first aired on CBS on November 4, 1961. Credited as Jack Searl, he appeared in 1962 as Slick - Henchman on the TV western Lawman in the episode titled "The Tarnished Badge" and in 1965 as Henden in the episode "Much A Glue About Nothing" of the situation comedy The Cara Williams Show.

== Partial filmography ==
Year	Film	Role	Director	Notes
1929	Daughters of Desire		Burton L. King	
1930	Paramount on Parade	Student (The Schoolroom) (uncredited)	Edmund Goulding and 10 other directors	
1930	The Sins of the Children	Nick Higgenson as a Child (uncredited)	Sam Wood	
1930	Tom Sawyer	Sid	John Cromwell	
1930	The March of Time	Himself	Charles Reisner	
1931	Scandal Sheet	Little Wilson Boy	John Cromwell	
1931	Finn and Hattie	Sidney	Norman Taurog	
1931	Skippy	Sidney	Norman Taurog	
1931	Daybreak	August	Jacques Feyder	
1931	Newly Rich	Tiny Tim	Norman Taurog	
1931	Huckleberry Finn	Sid Sawyer	Norman Taurog	
1931	Sooky	Sidney Saunders	Norman Taurog	
1931	The House That Shadows Built			(clip of upcoming film Huckleberry Finn) - (archive footage)
1932	Lovers Courageous	Willie as a Child	Robert Z. Leonard	
1932	The Miracle Man	Boy at Meadville RR Station (uncredited)	Norman Z. McLeod	
1932	Hearts of Humanity	Shandy O'Hara	Christy Cabanne	
1932	Little Orphan Annie	Sponge Throwing Orphan (uncredited)	Charles Kerr (assistant)	
1932	Officer Thirteen	Sammy	George Melford	
1933	Topaze	Charlemagne de La Tour-La Tour	D'Abbadie D'Arrast	
1933	A Lady's Profession	The Ship's Bad Boy	Norman Z. McLeod	
1933	High Gear	Jimmy Evans	Leigh Jason	
1933	The Return of Casey Jones		John P. McCarthy	
1933	Dangerous Crossroads	Detective's Son	Lambert Hillyer	
1933	One Year Later	Clarence	E. Mason Hopper	
1933	The Chief	Little Heinie in Hat Department (uncredited)	Charles Reisner	
1933	The World Changes	John - as a Boy (uncredited)	Mervyn LeRoy	
1933	Alice in Wonderland	Dormouse	Norman Z. McLeod	
1934	No Greater Glory	Gareb	Frank Borzage	
1934	Strictly Dynamite	Robin	Elliott Nugent (unbilled)	
1934	Murder on the Blackboard	Leland Stanford Jones	George Archainbaud	
1934	She Was a Lady	Herbie Vane	Hamilton MacFadden	
1934	Peck's Bad Boy	Horace Clay		
1934	Great Expectations	Herbert Pocket, as a chil	Stuart Walker	
1934	A Wicked Woman	Curtis as a Child	Charles Brabin	
1935	The Unwelcome Stranger	Andy 'Gimpy' Campbell - the Orphan	Phil Rosen	
1935	Ginger	Hamilton Parker	Lewis Seiler	
1936	Little Lord Fauntleroy	Tom	John Cromwell	
1936	Gentle Julia	Herbert Livingston Atwater	John G. Blystone	
1937	Two Wise Maids	Elliot 'Wet Mouth' Braxton	Phil Rosen	
1937	Wild and Woolly	Chaunce Ralston	Alfred L. Werker	
1938	Little Tough Guy	Cyril Gerrard	Harold Young	
1938	That Certain Age	Tony	Edward Ludwig	
1938	Little Tough Guys in Society	Randolph	Erle C. Kenton	
1939	The Angels Wash Their Faces	Alfred Goonplatz	Ray Enright	
1940	My Little Chickadee	Boy	Edward F. Cline	
1940	Military Academy	Prentiss Dover	D. Ross Lederman	
1941	Golden Hoofs	Sulky Driver (uncredited)	Lynn Shores	
1941	Glamour Boy	Georgie Clemons	Ralph Murphy	
1942	Small Town Deb	Tim Randall	Harold Schuster	
1945	Club Havana	Young Cavendish (uncredited)	Edgar G. Ulmer	
1947	The Fabulous Dorseys	Joe (uncredited)	Alfred E. Green	
1948	The Bride Goes Wild	Waiter in Diving Suit (uncredited)	Norman Taurog	
1948	Hazard	Public Defender	George Marshall	
1948	Beyond Glory	Lieutenant Brown (uncredited)	John Farrow	
1948	Lady at Midnight	Freddy Forsythe	Sam Newfield	
1948	The Paleface	Jasper Martin	Norman Z. McLeod	
1949	Passport to Pimlico	Legionnaire (uncredited)	Henry Cornelius	
1932	The Couch	Belmont (uncredited)	Owen Crump	
1960	Bat Masterson	Mr. O'Brien (as Jack Searle)		
1962	Gunsmoke	Floyd		
1963	Shotgun Wedding	Silas		
1964	A Tiger Walks	Sheriff's Adviser (uncredited)	Norman Tokar	
1967	Divorce American Style	Husband (uncredited)	Bud Yorkin	

== Television ==
Year	Title	Role	Notes
1961	Rawhide	Hollis	S3:E25, "Incident of the Running Man"
1962	Gunsmoke	Floyd	S8:E2, "Call Me Dodie"
1963	The Alfred Hitchcock Hour	Nicky Long	Season 2 Episode 1: "A Home Away from Home"
1963	Perry Mason	Ollie Benson	S6:E15, "The Case of the Prankish Professor"

== Bibliography ==
- Holmstrom, John. The Moving Picture Boy: An International Encyclopaedia from 1895 to 1995, Norwich, Michael Russell, 1996, pp. 98–99.
- Dye, David. Child and Youth Actors: Filmography of Their Entire Careers, 1914-1985. Jefferson, NC: McFarland & Co., 1988, pp. 210–211.
- Best, Marc. Those Endearing Young Charms: Child Performers of the Screen. South Brunswick and New York: Barnes & Co., 1971, pp. 230–234.
- Willson, Dixie. Little Hollywood Stars. Akron, OH, e New York: Saalfield Pub. Co., 1935.
