= The House That Shadows Built =

1931 Paramount Pictures compilation film

- Produced by: Adolph Zukor; Jesse L. Lasky
- Production company: Paramount Pictures
- Distributed by: Paramount Pictures
- Release date: July 8, 1931
- Running time: 47 minutes
- Country: United States
- Language: English

The House That Shadows Built is a 1931 feature compilation film produced by Paramount Pictures, made to celebrate the 20th anniversary of the studio's founding in 1912. The film was a promotional film for exhibitors and never had a regular theatrical release.

The film includes a brief history of Paramount, interviews with various actors, and clips from upcoming projects (some of which never came to fruition). The title comes from a biography of Paramount founder Adolph Zukor, The House That Shadows Built (1928), by William Henry Irwin.

== Marx Brothers segment ==
The film is best known for a six-minute segment starring the Marx Brothers (Groucho Marx, Harpo Marx, Chico Marx and Zeppo Marx), with Ben Taggart playing Mr. Lee, Theatrical Producer, which was intended to promote their forthcoming 1931 film Monkey Business.

The segment, containing material which was never included in any other Marx Brothers film, is a re-working of the first scene of their first successful Broadway revue I'll Say She Is (1924), which Groucho considered to have been the funniest work in the Brothers' career.

Except for some name changes and a few additional gags, the scene is nearly the same as the script used for the stage production. A few of the gags from I'll Say She Is were worked into the lobby scene in The Cocoanuts (1929), and a bit involving a series of Maurice Chevalier imitations was incorporated into the script of Monkey Business.

The Marx Brothers' segment is currently available as a special feature on the direct-to-DVD documentary film Inside the Marx Brothers, albeit in poor condition. Marx Brothers fans sometimes refer to this segment simply as I'll Say She Is, in light of its source material.

== Scenes from silent Paramount films ==
Several films presented are now considered lost. The clips presented represent the only known surviving footage.

Year*	Title	Star(s)	Notes	Ref
1912	Queen Elizabeth	Sarah Bernhardt	Produced in France	
1913	The Prisoner of Zenda	J. K. Hackett, playing a dual role		
1914	The Squaw Man	Dustin Farnum		
1914	A Good Little Devil	Mary Pickford	One reel survives	
1915	Carmen	Geraldine Farrar		
1914	The Call of the North	Robert Edeson and Theodore Roberts		
1915	The Captive	Blanche Sweet		
1917	Giving Becky a Chance	Vivian Martin and Jack Holt	Lost film	
1917	The Undying Flame	Olga Petrova and Mahlon Hamilton	Lost film	
1918	Huck and Tom	Jack Pickford and Robert Gordon		
1916	Snow White	Marguerite Clark		
1915	The Cheat	Sessue Hayakawa, Fannie Ward, and Jack Dean		
1916	The Heart of Nora Flynn	Marie Doro		
1918	The Whispering Chorus	Elliott Dexter, Kathlyn Williams, and Raymond Hatton		
1918	Battling Jane	Dorothy Gish	Lost film	
1918	Headin' South	Douglas Fairbanks	Lost film	
1917	The Little American	Mary Pickford		
1918	The Squaw Man	Elliott Dexter	Survives incomplete	
1919	For Better, for Worse	Gloria Swanson and Elliott Dexter		
1920	Dr. Jekyll and Mr. Hyde	John Barrymore		
1920	Homer Comes Home	Charles Ray		
1919	The Miracle Man	Lon Chaney, Betty Compson, Thomas Meighan and J. M. Dumont	Lost film	
1919	True Heart Susie	Lillian Gish		
1919	Male and Female	Gloria Swanson and Thomas Meighan		
1921	The Little Minister	Betty Compson		
1919	The Roaring Road	Wallace Reid and Theodore Roberts		
1920	On With the Dance	Mae Murray	Lost film	
1921	Sentimental Tommy	Gareth Hughes and May McAvoy	Lost film	
1921	The Sheik	Rudolph Valentino and Agnes Ayres		
1922	Nice People	Conrad Nagel, Bebe Daniels, William Boyd, and Wallace Reid	Lost film	
1923	The Covered Wagon			
1924	Peter Pan	Betty Bronson and Mary Brian		
1923	Wild Bill Hickok	William S. Hart and Kathleen O'Connor		
1926	The Grand Duchess and the Waiter	Adolphe Menjou and Florence Vidor		
1925	The Light of Western Stars	Noah Beery, Billie Dove, and Jack Holt	Lost film	
1923	The Ten Commandments			
1926	Behind the Front	Wallace Beery and Raymond Hatton		
1924	Forbidden Paradise	Pola Negri and Rod La Rocque		
1925	The Vanishing American	Richard Dix		
1925	Varieté	Emil Jannings and Lya De Putti	Produced in Germany	
1926	Beau Geste	Ronald Colman, Ralph Forbes, and Noah Beery		
1927	It	Clara Bow		
1927	The Kid Brother	Harold Lloyd and Constantine Romanoff		
1927	Underworld	George Bancroft		
1927	Wings	Clara Bow, Charles "Buddy" Rogers, and Richard Arlen		
*Sorts in order presented in the film

== Silent film performers in unidentified silent films ==
- George M. Cohan, possible films: Broadway Jones (1917), Seven Keys to Baldpate (1917), and Hit-The-Trail Holliday (1918)
- George Beban
- Elsie Ferguson, possible films: The Lie (1918) and The Avalanche (1919)
- Dorothy Dalton
- Billie Burke, film clip is most definitely from The Land of Promise (1917)
- Ethel Clayton
- Lila Lee
- Pauline Frederick
- Bryant Washburn
- Irene Castle

The Lon Chaney Sr. segment is one of only two short sequences which survive from The Miracle Man (1919). The other clip is featured in one of Paramount's Movie Milestone series, Movie Memories (1935), showcasing the studios' greatest achievements. This latter clip shows both a segment from the conclave in Chinatown as well as the healing scene which is in The House That Shadows Built. A nitrate print of Movie Memories is reportedly at the UCLA Film and Television Archive but has not yet been preserved.

== Then-current Paramount stars ==
The film moves on to show segments with Paramount players of the 1931–32 season, including George Bancroft, Nancy Carroll, the Four Marx Brothers, Charles "Buddy" Rogers, Clive Brook, Phillips Holmes, Sylvia Sidney, Eleanor Boardman, Frances Dee, Jackie Searl, Kay Francis, Judith Wood, Regis Toomey, Peggy Shannon, Jackie Coogan, Lilyan Tashman, Eugene Pallette, Anna May Wong, Juliette Compton, Stuart Erwin, William Boyd, Miriam Hopkins, Wynne Gibson, Jack Oakie, Ginger Rogers, Robert Coogan, Carmen Barnes, Charlie Ruggles, Richard "Skeets" Gallagher, Mitzi Green, Richard Arlen, Carole Lombard, Fredric March, Claudette Colbert, Paul Lukas, Tallulah Bankhead, Gary Cooper, Ruth Chatterton, Marlene Dietrich, and Maurice Chevalier.

These stars are announced as appearing in upcoming films, including some never produced or released by Paramount:

- An Entirely Different Woman with Marlene Dietrich (never produced, based on the German novel Eine ganz andere Frau by Georg Froschel)
- No One Man from the Rupert Hughes novel
- Daughter of the Dragon with Anna May Wong, Warner Oland, and Sessue Hayakawa
- 24 Hours with Clive Brook, Kay Francis, and Regis Toomey
- Girls About Town with Kay Francis, Lilyan Tashman, and Eugene Pallette
- Dr. Jekyll and Mr. Hyde with Fredric March and Miriam Hopkins
- Personal Maid with Nancy Carroll
- Uncertain Woman with Claudette Colbert (based on Edgar Wallace novel The Girl from Scotland Yard, never produced)
- The Road to Reno with Charles "Buddy" Rogers and Lilyan Tashman
- The Round-Up with Eugene Pallette, Stuart Erwin, Skeets Gallagher, and Frances Dee (not produced by Paramount until 1941)
- Silence with Clive Brook, Marjorie Rambeau, and Peggy Shannon
- A Farewell to Arms with Gary Cooper and Eleanor Boardman (Helen Hayes replaced Boardman in the final film)
- My Sin with Tallulah Bankhead and Fredric March
- Ladies of the Big House
- Huckleberry Finn with Jackie Coogan, Mitzi Green, Junior Durkin, and Jackie Searl
- Rich Man's Folly with George Bancroft
- The Man With Red Hair (horror film based on novel Portrait of a Man With Red Hair by Hugh Walpole, never produced)
- The Lives of a Bengal Lancer filmed by Ernest B. Schoedsack (not made until 1935, using footage shot in India by Schoedsack in 1931)
- Tomorrow and Tomorrow with Ruth Chatterton

Scenes are shown that were shot for the following films:

- An American Tragedy with Phillips Holmes, Sylvia Sidney, and Frances Dee
- Secrets of a Secretary with Claudette Colbert, Herbert Marshall, and Georges Metaxa
- Sooky directed by Norman Taurog, with Jackie Cooper and Robert Coogan
- Murder by the Clock with William Boyd, Lilyan Tashman, Regis Toomey, and Irving Pichel
- Monkey Business with the Marx Brothers (see above section)
- Stepdaughters of War with Ruth Chatterton and directed by Dorothy Arzner (never released)
- The Smiling Lieutenant directed by Ernst Lubitsch with Maurice Chevalier, Claudette Colbert, Charlie Ruggles, and Miriam Hopkins

== See also ==
- A Trip to Paramountown (1922 promotional film made by Paramount)
