= Huckleberry Finn (1931 film) =

1931 film

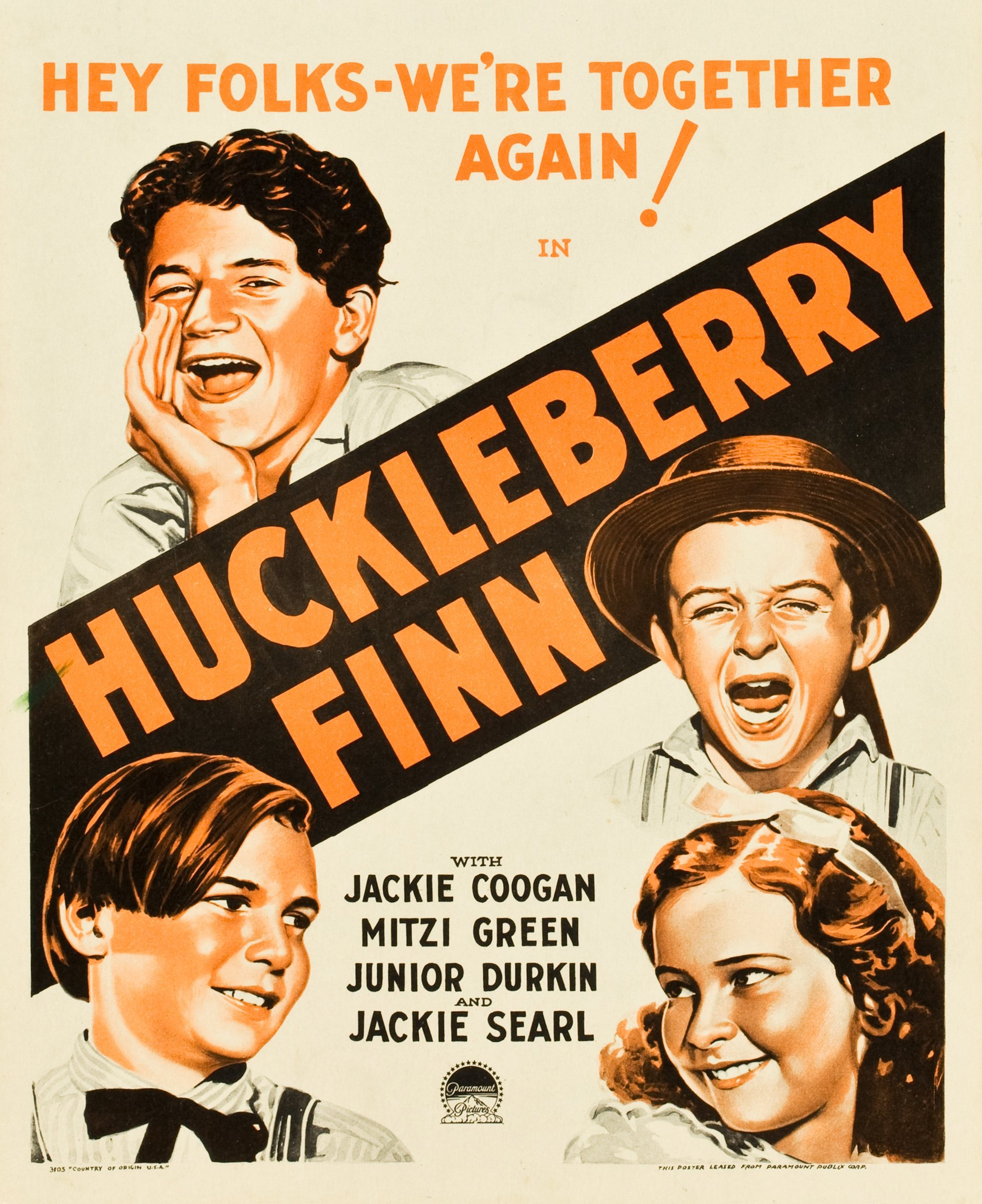
- Window card
- Directed by: Norman Taurog
- Written by: Grover Jones; William Slavens McNutt
- Based on: The Adventures of Huckleberry Finn by Mark Twain
- Produced by: Adolph Zukor; Jesse L. Lasky
- Starring: Jackie Coogan; Mitzi Green; Junior Durkin; Jackie Searl
- Cinematography: Dave Abel
- Distributed by: Paramount Pictures
- Release date: August 7, 1931
- Running time: 79 minutes
- Country: United States
- Language: English
- Budget: $1 million
- Box office: $2.5 million

Huckleberry Finn is a 1931 American pre-Code adventure comedy film directed by Norman Taurog, and written by Grover Jones and William Slavens McNutt, loosely based on Mark Twain's 1884 novel The Adventures of Huckleberry Finn. It stars Jackie Coogan as Tom Sawyer, Mitzi Green as Becky Thatcher, Junior Durkin as Huckleberry Finn, and Jackie Searl as Sid Sawyer.

== Plot ==
Once homeless and free to do as he pleased, Huckleberry Finn's situation has changed since he and Tom Sawyer found $12,000 in treasure. Huck has been taken in by the kindly Widow Douglas and her more severe and disapproving spinster sister, Miss Watson, and he is having great difficulty adjusting to a "respectable" life. To complicate matters, Tom is wooing the prissy Becky Thatcher, who is jealous of his friendship with Huck and tries to thwart it. Huck, once the secret envy of his peers, now feels embarrassed because his classmates tease him about his lack of schooling. But the most serious problem on the horizon is the return of Huck's drunken, no-account Pap, who has shown up in town determined to get his hands on Huck's share of the fortune. Pap kidnaps Huck and holds him prisoner in a remote shack. When Huck escapes, he decides to run off down the river and hide out. Tom and the Widow Douglas' slave, Jim, accompany him. The trio soon run into two con men, masquerading as a Duke and the supposedly deposed king of France. While begging for food in a river town, Tom and Huck meet Mary Jane, a sweet-natured young lady who was recently orphaned and has $14,000 worth of gold hidden in her fruit cellar. When the King and the Duke are tipped off about this, they launch a scheme to rob Mary Jane by pretending to be long-lost relatives. Tom naively believes the supposedly royal pair have "letters of mark" and are therefore entitled to do as they please, but Huck, who has befriended Mary Jane, decides to protect her. When Tom tries to stop him, Huck socks Tom in the jaw. Huck finds the gold, convinces Tom the Duke and King are no good and exposes the plot in front of the local sheriff and townspeople. His reward is a kiss from Mary Jane. Huck, Tom and Jim return home, where it seems Huck will try to make more of an effort to adjust to his new surroundings.

== Cast ==
- Jackie Coogan as Tom Sawyer
- Junior Durkin as Huckleberry Finn
- Mitzi Green as Becky Thatcher
- Jackie Searl as Sid Sawyer
- Clarence Muse as Jim
- Eugene Pallette as Duke of Bridgewater
- Oscar Apfel as The King
- Clara Blandick as Aunt Polly
- Jane Darwell as Widow Douglas
- Warner Richmond as Pap Finn
- Charlotte Henry as Mary Jane
- Lillian Harmer as Miss Watson
- Guy Oliver as Judge Thatcher
- Edward LeSaint as Doc Robinson (uncredited)
- Frank McGlynn Sr. as Teacher (uncredited)

== Production ==
This is an adaptation of the classic novel Adventures of Huckleberry Finn by Mark Twain and is a follow-up to Tom Sawyer (1930). Omitting the entire issue of whether or not Huck ought to turn the slave Jim back in after Jim escapes his owners, it concentrated mostly on the comedy in the novel, and turned Jim into the typical comic "darkie" stereotype of that era.

The film was made as a follow-up to Paramount's Tom Sawyer, which had been released a year earlier with substantially the same cast and became the top-grossing film of 1930.

However, as happened with Tom Sawyer, the 1931 Huckleberry Finn was superseded only eight years later by MGM's The Adventures of Huckleberry Finn, starring Mickey Rooney as Huck, Rex Ingram as Jim, Walter Connolly as the King, and William Frawley as the Duke.

An earlier version of the screenplay included a substantially more detailed set-up of Huck's rocky relationship with Miss Watson, a lengthy comic scene in which Tom insists on engineering a grand escape for Huck from Pap's shack, and more tender moments between Huck and Mary Jane.

== Reception ==
According to Leonard Maltin, the film is "charming, but very, very dated".

== See also ==
- The House That Shadows Built (1931 Paramount promotional film)
