= Tom Sawyer (1930 film) =

1930 film

- Lobby card
- Directed by: John Cromwell
- Written by: Grover Jones; William Slavens McNutt; Sam Mintz
- Based on: The Adventures of Tom Sawyer; 1876 novel by Mark Twain
- Produced by: Louis D. Lighton
- Starring: Jackie Coogan; Junior Durkin; Mitzi Green
- Cinematography: Charles Lang
- Edited by: Alyson Shaffer
- Music by: Ralph Rainger
- Production company: Paramount Pictures
- Distributed by: Paramount Pictures
- Release date: January 18, 1930
- Running time: 86 minutes
- Country: United States
- Language: English

Tom Sawyer is a 1930 American pre-Code comedy-drama film directed by John Cromwell and starring Jackie Coogan. The screenplay by Grover Jones, William Slavens McNutt, and Sam Mintz is based on the 1876 novel The Adventures of Tom Sawyer by Mark Twain.

The film was the third screen adaptation of the Twain novel, following silent versions released in 1907 and 1917. The picture was made on location at the Paramount Ranch in Agoura, California.

A sequel, Huckleberry Finn, directed by Norman Taurog and featuring most of the Tom Sawyer cast, was released the following year.

== Plot ==
Tom Sawyer (1930)

After arguing with his sweetheart, Becky Thatcher, Tom Sawyer seeks solace from his friend Huck Finn, who tells him about a mysterious cure for warts that requires them to visit the local cemetery at midnight. While there, they witness a murder committed by Injun Joe. Joe convinces Muff Potter, who was also there but in an inebriated state, that Muff is guilty of the crime. Tom and Huck promise each other they will not divulge what they have seen.

When Tom is caught lying about stealing his half-brother Sid's crabapples, his Aunt Polly punishes him by making him whitewash the fence on a Saturday morning. The boy leads his friends to believe he is enjoying the task, and before long they are giving him their treasures in exchange for the privilege of joining in the fun.

Together with Huck and Joe Harper, Tom runs away from home to become a pirate. The three set off on a raft to Jacksons Island in the Mississippi River, where they remain for three days. Upon returning home, Tom discovers it was thought the three had drowned, and the boys attend their own funeral service at the church.

At Muff Potter's trial, Tom admits the truth about the murder, but Injun Joe manages to escape. While attending the school picnic near a cavern, Tom and Becky decide to explore it and get lost. As they try to find their way out, they stumble upon Injun Joe and a chest of gold. While Joe angrily pursues the children, he falls into a crevasse and is killed. Huck finds Tom and Becky and leads them to safety, together with the treasure.

== Cast ==
- Jackie Coogan as Tom Sawyer
- Junior Durkin as Huckleberry Finn
- Mitzi Green as Becky Thatcher
- Lucien Littlefield as Schoolteacher
- Tully Marshall as Muff Potter
- Clara Blandick as Aunt Polly
- Mary Jane Irving as Mary
- Ethel Wales as Mrs. Harper
- Jackie Searl as Sid
- Dick Winslow as Joe Harper
- Jane Darwell as Widow Douglas
- Charles Stevens as Injun Joe
- Charles Sellon as Minister
- Lon Poff as Judge Thatcher

== Critical reception ==
Mordaunt Hall of The New York Times said of the film, "It is an extraordinarily faithful conception of the book, and while there are of necessity certain omissions and other parts that receive but scant attention, the main incidents are included in a detailed fashion. It is wonderfully interesting to see Mark Twain's characters come to the talking screen, for if there are minor discrepancies, they are unimportant . . . Jackie Coogan's Tom Sawyer is excellent . . . In fact, the whole cast is unusually competent. Mr. Cromwell's direction is imaginative and restrained. The result is that this picture is one of the few that can be seen with appreciation and enjoyment, even immediately after reading the book over again."

However, this version was eventually superseded only eight years later by David O. Selznick's 1938 Technicolor remake of the novel, which, true to Selznick's legendary fastidiousness, boasted not only better performances but a far more cinematic style than the fixed-camera early talkie look of the original. The cave sequence in the 1938 version is noted for being one of the most terrifying sequences in a family motion picture, with Becky Thatcher (Ann Gillis) toppling over into hysteria after the death of Injun Joe (Victor Jory).

== Sequels ==
Coogan and Durkin reprised their roles as Tom and Huck in Huckleberry Finn and the box office success of the two pictures led Paramount Pictures to announce Tom Sawyer, Detective and Tom Sawyer Abroad would be the next films in the series. But in April 1931, Variety reported both projects were being postponed for a year because the studio was concerned about having too many children's films in the marketplace. Tom Sawyer Abroad was never produced, but Paramount did film Tom Sawyer, Detective in 1938 with Billy Cook as Tom and Donald O'Connor as Huck.
