= Ginger (1935 film) =

1935 film directed by Lewis Seiler

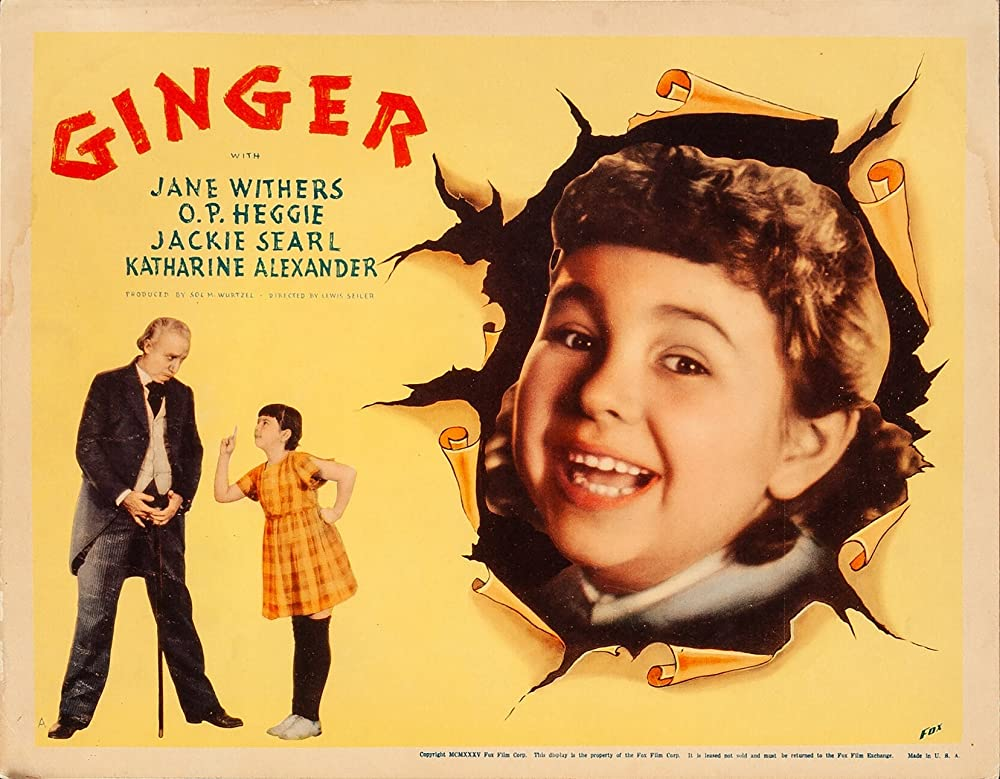
- Directed by: Lewis Seiler
- Screenplay by: Arthur Kober
- Produced by: Sol M. Wurtzel
- Starring: Jane Withers; O. P. Heggie; Jackie Searl; Katharine Alexander; Walter Woolf King
- Cinematography: Bert Glennon
- Music by: Samuel Kaylin
- Production company: Fox Film Corporation
- Distributed by: 20th Century-Fox Film Corporation
- Release date: July 5, 1935
- Running time: 80 minutes
- Country: United States
- Language: English

Ginger is a 1935 American comedy-drama film directed by Lewis Seiler and written by Arthur Kober. The film stars Jane Withers in her first starring role, O. P. Heggie, Jackie Searl, Katharine Alexander, and Walter Woolf King.

== Plot ==
Jeanette Tracy, known to her friends as Ginger, is an 8-year-old orphan living in a New York slum apartment with her "Uncle Rex", an aging Shakespearean actor. Their poor but happy existence is framed by lines from famous Shakespearean plays which they recite to each other; their favorite is the balcony scene from Romeo and Juliet. One day, a probation officer comes to the apartment and threatens to take Ginger away if she doesn't stop skipping school and Uncle Rex remains unemployed. Uncle Rex says he has found a job at the casting office and Ginger assures the officer that she will be a model student from now on. It turns out that Uncle Rex's new job is as a barker for a movie theater, and he is arrested when he attacks the manager who insults his Shakespearean acting. Unable to pay the $30 fine, he is sent to jail for 30 days.

Ginger steals small metal pieces from stores to come up with money to pay the fine and is caught and brought before a judge. He suggests that the well-to-do Mrs. Parker, who is writing a book about child-raising called Are Children Human? take her into her own home. Mrs. Parker's son, Hamilton, is the product of her ideas: an effeminate, snobbish, harp-playing youth. The contrast between Hamilton and Ginger is stark, as Ginger is a tomboy, speaks slang, and lacks table manners. But Mr. Parker, who disapproves of his wife's child-raising ideas, takes a liking to Ginger and offers to bail out Uncle Rex. When he brings him home to pick up Ginger, Uncle Rex is so overwhelmed by the elegant house and the opportunities that wealth can afford for Ginger's upbringing that he runs out on her. He is struck by a truck and spends several months in a hospital with aphasia.

As the months pass, Ginger becomes more and more cultured while Hamilton becomes more streetwise. When they are taken out for a ride on Thanksgiving day, Ginger spots her old gang and Hamilton gets into a fight with an older boy who has taken Ginger's dog. Hamilton wins the fight. Back home, Ginger overhears Mrs. Parker reading from her book to her ladies' club, describing how uncouth Ginger was when she came to her and asserting that Uncle Rex isn't her real uncle at all, but a friend of her deceased actor-parents. Ginger becomes inconsolable and runs away with Hamilton back to her slum apartment. There they find Uncle Rex, who has found his way home. The Parkers join them there, having made up with one another after Mrs. Parker agrees to be more "human" in her child-raising efforts.

== Cast ==
- Jane Withers as Ginger
- O. P. Heggie as Rexford Whittington
- Jackie Searl as Hamilton Parker
- Katharine Alexander as Mrs. Elizabeth Parker
- Walter Woolf King as Daniel Parker
- Charles Lane as judge

== Production ==
=== Development ===
The film was produced under the working title of Little Annie Rooney. Fox Film Corporation had acquired the rights to that comic strip.

=== Casting ===
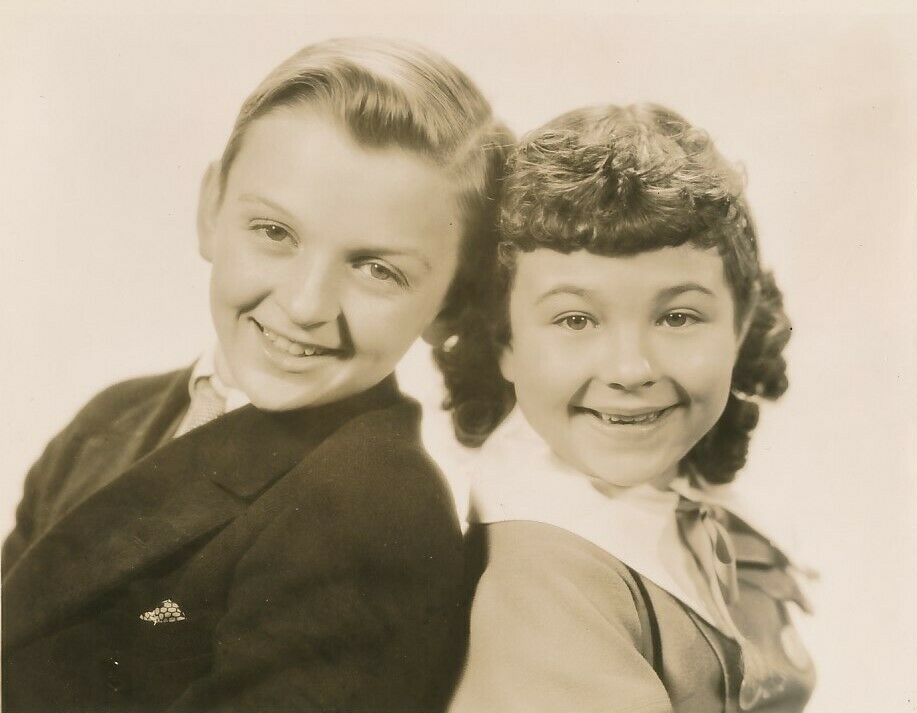
Publicity photo of Jackie Searl and Jane Withers in Ginger

Ginger was Jane Withers' first starring role. She had come to national attention in December 1934 in the role of a bratty child opposite the angelic Shirley Temple in Bright Eyes (1934). Based on that role, moviegoers had lobbied for her to be paired with Jackie Searl, who was known for his own "impish" characters, and by February 1935 Fox was looking for a vehicle to star both Withers and Searl. Producer Sol M. Wurtzel, who had also produced Bright Eyes, reportedly hand-picked the cast for this film.

=== Filming ===
Filming took place from April 12 to mid-May 1935. Filming began on Withers' ninth birthday, and she received two bouquets of flowers on the set. One was from W. C. Fields, who wrote: "To my little friend, Jane, one swell girl. Knock 'em dead, kid, you're going to be great. Your pen pal and fan, W.C." The second was from President Franklin D. Roosevelt, who wrote: "To my little friend, Jane, God bless you, I know you are going to be one of our greatest stars in America. Your friend, Franklin Delano Roosevelt". Roosevelt had been following Withers' career after seeing her do an impersonation of him in a newsreel. Withers had also impersonated Fields on her radio program in Atlanta.

In one scene in the film, Withers performs impersonations of ZaSu Pitts and Greta Garbo. Withers was imitating a recording she had heard by British impersonator Florence Desmond. Unaware of this fact beforehand, the Fox legal department scrambled to obtain permission from Desmond after Withers had filmed the scene.

== Release ==
The film was released on July 5, 1935.

== Critical reception ==
Critical reviews widely praised Withers' starring turn and predicted a rosy future for her. Calling Withers a "child prodigy", The Cincinnati Enquirer listed the ways she differed from Shirley Temple, being older and playing a tomboy. It then compared Withers to child actor Mitzi Green, stating: "She has the same precociousness, same daredevil atmosphere, and is adept at impersonations. Furthermore, Jane does show some acting talent". The Salt Lake Tribune noted Withers' "versatility" in the film, explaining: "She goes from a street fight into Juliet's balcony scene with the ease of a veteran player. She is a hearty and refreshing new type". The Brooklyn Daily Eagle elaborated:

The body of the narrative Miss Withers carries almost by herself. She is ever before the camera and runs the gamut of childlike emotions as well as some that aren't so childlike. She is alternately hoydenish and lovable, gagging and demure; she burlesques Greta Garbo and Zasu Pitts and enacts the balcony scene from Romeo and Juliet without making it ridiculous. ... Miss Withers' scenes are of three kinds, those in which she is precocious and amusing because possessed of a sophistication beyond her years; those in which she is a child and charming for her childish ways and those where she really acts. She acts, I am glad to report, a great deal and with much vitality and her comic sense is a keen and lively one.

The New York Times praised the film as "a fresh, human and warm photoplay, rich in natural values, sensitively directed by Lewis Seiler (who used to teach school in Brooklyn and should know children) and played for all it is worth by an excellent cast". Though the review said the script borders on a Cinderella fable, it called the dialogue "bright" and the plot elements "cleverly selected for their comic or sentimental values". The New York Daily News agreed that the film had a Cinderella-like storyline, but reported that the theater audience heartily enjoyed hearing the stream of slang issue from the mouth of the "charming" Withers, who "refers to people as guys, muggs and lugs" and "calls her Park Ave. benefactress 'sourpuss' and her stiff-necked friends 'a bunch of frozen pans'". This review also described Searl's comedic performance as "excellent". The Akron Beacon Journal took a less complimentary view of the script, calling it "a story of extreme improbabilities and sentimental frills".

Critical praise was also reserved for O. P. Heggie's performance, which The Salt Lake Tribune described as a "mellow portrayal" that is "one of the picture's highlights".

The New York Daily News pointed out an error in rear-projection for a scene in which Mr. Parker is taking Uncle Rex to his house in a car during a rainstorm. The scene seen through the car's rear window shows a sunny day and people walking about without coats.

== Sources ==
- Solomon, Aubrey (2014). The Fox Film Corporation, 1915-1935: A History and Filmography. McFarland. ISBN 9780786486106.
- Verswijver, Leo (2003). "Movies Were Always Magical": Interviews with 19 Actors, Directors, and Producers from the Hollywood of the 1930s through the 1950s. McFarland. ISBN 9780786411290.
- Wojcik, Pamela Robinson (2016). Fantasies of Neglect: Imagining the Urban Child in American Film and Fiction. Rutgers University Press. ISBN 9780813573625.
