= Lost in Alaska =

1952 American comedy film

- Theatrical release poster
- Directed by: Jean Yarbrough
- Written by: Martin Ragaway; Leonard Stern
- Produced by: Howard Christie
- Starring: Bud Abbott; Lou Costello; Mitzi Green; Tom Ewell; Iron Eyes Cody
- Cinematography: George Robinson
- Edited by: Leonard Weiner
- Music by: Joseph Gershenson
- Distributed by: Universal Pictures
- Release date: July 28, 1952
- Running time: 76 minutes
- Country: United States
- Language: English
- Budget: $677,230
- Box office: $1.5 million (U.S. rentals)

Lost in Alaska is a 1952 American film directed by Jean Yarbrough and starring comedy duo Abbott and Costello.

== Plot ==
In 1890s San Francisco, firemen George Ball and Tom Watson rescue "Nugget Joe" McDermott from committing suicide by drowning. Joe wants to die because his girlfriend Rosette no longer loves him. Joe receives a telegram the next morning from Rosette claiming that she still loves him. George and Tom take their gold reward to the bank when they learn that the police mistakenly believe that they murdered Joe for his gold. They find Joe on his boat headed for the Yukon and try to persuade him to go to the police station, but the ship departs with all three of them aboard.

In Alaska, George and Tom are eager to return Joe to San Francisco to clear their names. Many people in Alaska want to kill Joe, as he was once the local sheriff who hanged many people. A group of Joe's old friends also want him dead as they are the beneficiaries of his will. Rosette works at a casino whose owner Jake Stillman demands that she marry Joe, whom Jake also plans to kill once he is married to Rosette, so that he can gain the fortune in gold.

Rosette reveals Jake's intent to George and Tom, who hide Joe and Rosette by sending them away from town. Jake is unhappy about the turn of events and sends his gang to face George and Tom, who outwit them. In the ensuing melee, the gold falls into a deep crevice in the ice and is lost. Everyone manages to overcome their greed for the sake of friendship, and Joe and Rosette marry.

== Cast ==
- Bud Abbott as Tom Watson
- Lou Costello as George Bell
- Mitzi Green as Rosetta
- Tom Ewell as "Nugget Joe" McDermott
- Bruce Cabot as Jake Stillman
- Emory Parnell as Sherman
- Jack Ingram as Henchman
- Rex Lease as Old Timer

== Production ==
The film project, under the working title of The Sourdoughs, appeared to be in jeopardy when in November 1951, Bud Abbott and Lou Costello filed a lawsuit against Universal Pictures and Realart Pictures for $5 million, a sum that included profits from their old films as well as compensation for damage to their artistic reputations for cutting their films into short reels and showing them in "cheap places of entertainment". Abbott and Costello claimed that Universal had submitted fraudulent financial statements to avoid paying them the 50% share of profits owed to them under the terms of their contract. Realart was accused of having signed a secret agreement with Universal to rerelease some of their films without their consent.

One week before production began, Lou Costello was quoted as saying: "Bud and I are making 'Sourdoughs' under protest. We're suing the studio for three million dollars." The men were hoping to be released from their contract, but they eventually settled for $2 million and additional profits from several of their prior films. Two weeks after the settlement, they renewed their contract with Universal Pictures through 1955.

Production began on December 3, 1951, with the film's title as The Sourdoughs. The following week, the film was retitled Lost in Alaska, and its production wrapped by the end of the month.

== Home media ==
This film was released on DVD as part of The Best of Abbott and Costello Volume Three in 2004 and as part of Abbott and Costello: The Complete Universal Pictures Collection in 2008.
