= Forbidden Adventure =

1931 film

- Directed by: Norman Taurog
- Written by: Edward E. Paramore; Joseph L. Mankiewicz; Agnes Brand Leahy (scenario)
- Based on: story "Let's Play King" by Sinclair Lewis
- Starring: Mitzi Green; Edna May Oliver; Louise Fazenda; Jackie Searl; Bruce Line
- Distributed by: Paramount Pictures
- Release date: July 2, 1931 (New York City)
- Running time: 77 minutes
- Country: United States
- Language: English
- Budget: $270,000

Forbidden Adventure, also known as Newly Rich, is a 1931 American pre-Code comedy film directed by Norman Taurog and starring Mitzi Green, Edna May Oliver, Louise Fazenda and Jackie Searl. Filming took place from April 2 to May 7, 1931.

== Plot ==
Three children - two actors and a king - run away from their constricted lives and have a forbidden adventure.

== Cast ==
- Mitzi Green as Daisy Tate
- Edna May Oliver as Bessie Tate
- Louise Fazenda as Maggie Tiffany
- Jackie Searl as Tiny Tim
- Bruce Line as King Maximilian
- Virginia Hammond as Queen Sedonia
- Lawrence Grant as Equerry
- Dell Henderson as Director
