= Laughing at Life =

1933 film

- Directed by: Ford Beebe
- Written by: Ford Beebe (story); Prescott Chaplin (screenplay); Thomas J. Dugan (screenplay)
- Produced by: Nat Levine
- Cinematography: Tom Galligan; Ernest Miller
- Edited by: Joseph Kane; Ray Snyder
- Distributed by: Mascot Pictures
- Release date: July 12, 1933
- Running time: 71 minutes
- Country: United States
- Language: English

Laughing at Life is a 1933 American pre-Code film directed by Ford Beebe.

== Plot summary ==
Easter, a soldier of fortune and gunrunner, leaves his family behind escaping from the authorities and an American detective named Mason. His globe-hopping escape leads him finally to South America, where he is hired to organize a band of revolutionaries, unaware that they plan to eliminate him when his job is done. Here, also, he encounters his own son, who is on track to waste his own life in pursuits similar to Easter's.

== Cast ==
- Victor McLaglen as Dennis P. McHale / Burke / Captain Hale
- Conchita Montenegro as Panchita
- William "Stage" Boyd as Inspector Mason
- Lois Wilson as Mrs. McHale
- Henry B. Walthall as President Valenzuela
- Regis Toomey as Pat Collins / Mc Hale
- Ruth Hall as Alice Lawton
- Guinn 'Big Boy' Williams as Jones
- Dewey Robinson as Smith
- Ivan Lebedeff as Don Flavio Montenegro
- Mathilde Comont as Mamacita
- Noah Beery as Hauseman
- J. Farrell MacDonald as The Warden
- Tully Marshall as Stone
- Henry Armetta as Fruit Vendor
- Edmund Breese as Cabinet Officer
- Frankie Darro as Chango
- Otis Harlan as Businessman
- Buster Phelps as Young Pat 'Denny' McHale
- Arthur Hoyt as Businessman
- Pat O'Malley as Detective Agency Official
- William Desmond as Military Cabinet Officer
- Lloyd Whitlock as World War I Commanding Officer
- Philo McCullough as Capt. Valdez
