= Hell's House =

1932 film

- Theatrical release poster
- Directed by: Howard Higgin
- Written by: Paul Gangelin; B. Harrison Orkow
- Produced by: B. F. Zeidman
- Starring: Junior Durkin; Bette Davis; Pat O'Brien
- Cinematography: Allen G. Siegler
- Edited by: Edward Schroeder
- Production company: B.F. Zeidman Productions Ltd.
- Distributed by: Capitol Film Exchange
- Release date: February 10, 1932
- Running time: 72 minutes
- Country: United States
- Language: English

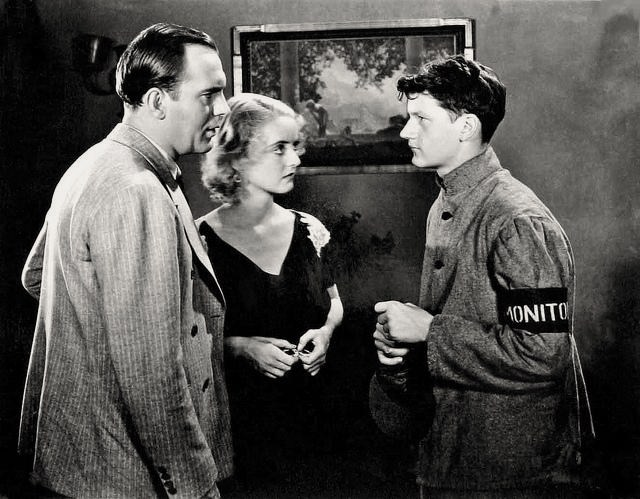
L-R: Pat O'Brien, Bette Davis & Junior Durkin

Hell's House is a 1932 American Pre-Code drama film starring Junior Durkin, featuring Bette Davis and directed by Howard Higgin. The screenplay by Paul Gangelin and B. Harrison Orkow, set during the waning days of the Prohibition era, is based on a story by Higgin.

== Plot ==
Bette Davis and Pat O'Brien

When orphaned Jimmy Mason is taken in by his Aunt Emma and Uncle Henry, he meets their boarder, Matt Kelly, who impresses the young man with his boastful swagger and alleged political connections, although in reality he's a bootlegger.

The boy's life is disrupted when, as one of Kelly's hired hands, he refuses to identify his boss during a police raid and is sentenced to three years of hard labor in reform school, where he befriends a sickly boy named Shorty, who in helping Jimmy, eventually is sent to solitary confinement.

When Jimmy realizes his new pal is seriously ill and desperately needs medical attention, he escapes and goes to Kelly and Kelly's girl friend, Peggy Gardner, for help. Peggy contacts newspaper columnist Frank Gebhardt, who is anxious to expose the conditions at the state industrial school.

The authorities find Jimmy at Gebhardt's office, but before they can apprehend him Kelly admits his involvement in the bootlegging operation and the boy is set free. He discovers Shorty has died, victimized by a corrupt system.

== Cast ==
- Bette Davis as Peggy Gardner
- Pat O'Brien as Matt Kelly
- Junior Durkin as Jimmy Mason
- Frank Coghlan Jr. as Shorty
- Emma Dunn as Emma Clark
- Charley Grapewin as Henry Clark
- Morgan Wallace as Frank Gebhardt
- Hooper Atchley as Captain Of The Guard
- Wallis Clark as Judge Robinson
- James A. Marcus as Superintendent Charles Thompson

== Production ==
The film, shot in thirteen days, originally was entitled Juvenile Court. Bette Davis was loaned to B. F. Zeidman Productions Ltd. by Universal Pictures, and following her completion of this film studio head Carl Laemmle, Jr. allowed her option to drop. She was preparing to return to New York City when George Arliss offered her the ingenue role in The Man Who Played God.

== Critical reception ==
In his review in The New York Times, Mordaunt Hall observed, "The attempt to pillory reform schools . . . is hardly adult in its attack, but it has a few moderately interesting interludes . . . The direction of this film is old-fashioned. Pat O'Brien . . . gives a forced performance. Young Durkin's playing is sincere and likewise that of Bette Davis as Peggy."
