= Frisco Jenny =

1932 film

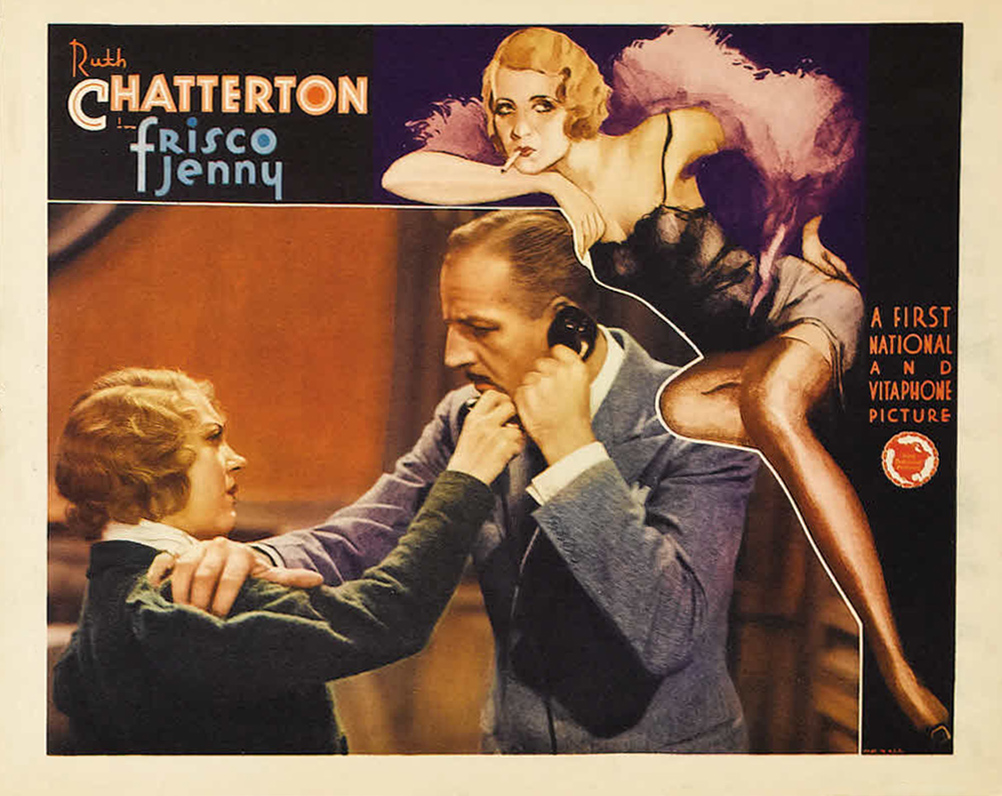
- Lobby card
- Directed by: William A. Wellman
- Written by: Lillie Hayward (story); John Francis Larkin (story); Robert Lord; Wilson Mizner
- Based on: Common Ground; 1926 story in Red Book Magazine by Gerald Beaumont
- Produced by: Raymond Griffith
- Starring: Ruth Chatterton; Louis Calhern
- Cinematography: Sidney Hickox
- Edited by: James Morley
- Music by: Leo F. Forbstein
- Production company: First National Pictures
- Distributed by: First National Pictures
- Release date: December 30, 1932
- Running time: 71-73 minutes
- Country: United States
- Language: English

Frisco Jenny is a 1932 American pre-Code drama film directed by William A. Wellman and starring Ruth Chatterton and Louis Calhern. Its story bears a resemblance to Madame X (1929), Chatterton's previous hit film.

== Plot ==
In 1906 San Francisco, Jenny Sandoval, a denizen of the notorious Tenderloin district, wants to marry piano player Dan McAllister, but her saloonkeeper father Jim adamantly is opposed to it. An earthquake kills both men and devastates the city. In the aftermath, Jenny gives birth to a son, whom she names Dan.

With financial help from crooked lawyer Steve Dutton, who also came from the Tenderloin, she enters the vice trade, providing women on demand. Jenny has one loyal friend, the Chinese woman Amah, who helps take care of the baby.

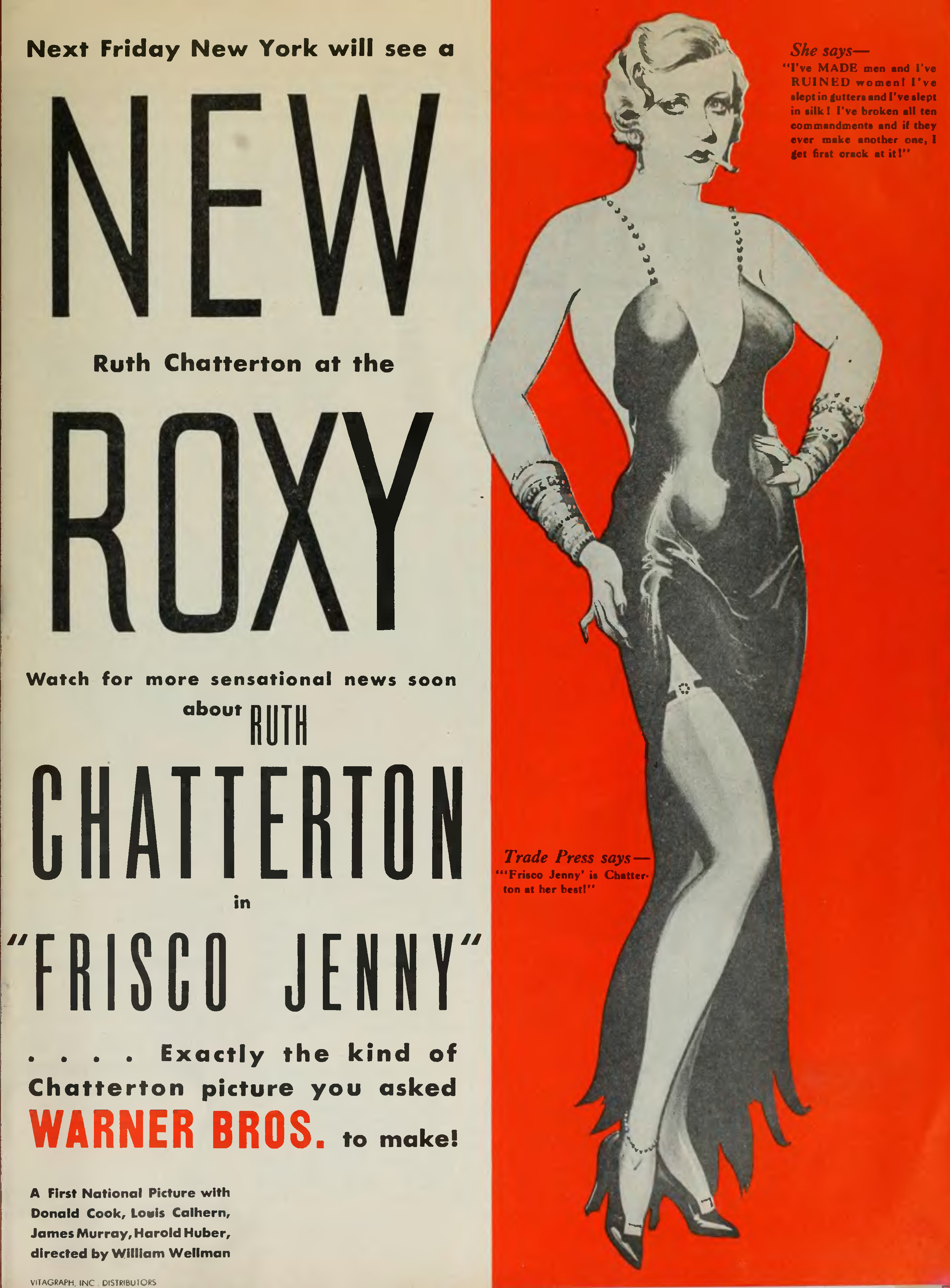
Frisco Jenny with Ruth Chatterton ad from, The Film Daily,1932

At a party in Steve's honor, he catches gambler Ed Harris cheating him in a back room. In the ensuing struggle, Steve kills him, with Jenny the only eyewitness. The pair are unable to dispose of the body before it is found, and they are questioned by the police but not charged. The scandal forces Jenny to temporarily surrender her baby to a respectable couple who owe Steve a favor in order to prevent the forcible removal of the child by a children's welfare society with a court order.

After three years, Jenny tries to reclaim her son, but when he clings to the only mother whom he knows, she leaves him with his adoptive parents. Years later, Dan graduates from Stanford University, where he was a football star, and becomes an assistant district attorney. Jenny lovingly follows his progress while taking command of vice and bootlegging in the city.

When Dan runs for district attorney, his opponent is Tom Ford, a man who does Jenny's bidding. Against her best interests, she frames Ford so that Dan can win. When Steve tries to bribe Dan to free some of his men, Steve is arrested. Out on bail, Steve asks Jenny to blackmail Dan into dropping the charges, but she refuses to jeopardize her son's future. When Steve threatens to reveal that Jenny is Dan's real mother, she shoots and kills Steve at Dan's office.

Jenny is arrested and prosecuted by Dan. Refusing to defend herself, she is condemned to death by hanging. Amah pleads with her to tell Dan the truth in the hope that he can help her, but when he comes to see her, she remains silent. Jenny beseeches Amah never to reveal the truth to Dan.

With Jenny now dead, Amah throws Jenny's newspaper clippings following Dan's achievements into the fireplace.

== Cast ==
- Ruth Chatterton as Frisco Jenny Sandoval
- Louis Calhern as Steve Dutton
- Helen Jerome Eddy as Amah
- Donald Cook as Dan Reynolds
- James Murray as Dan McAllister
- Hallam Cooley as Willie Gleason
- Pat O'Malley as Policeman Pat O'Hoolihan
- Harold Huber as George Weaver
- Robert Emmett O'Connor as Jim Sandoval
- Willard Robertson as Police Captain Tom

Uncredited:

- Gertrude Astor as Miss Beulah
- Joe Bordeaux as Drunken Sailor
- Ed Brady as Party Guest
- Don Brodie as Man in Meal Line
- Eddy Chandler as Man Posting Earthquake Deaths
- Wong Chung as Chinese Man
- Berton Churchill as Judge Thomas B. Reynolds
- Heinie Conklin as Waiter Finding Body
- John Webb Dillion as Police Photographer
- Noel Francis as Rosie
- Dorothy Granger as Hortense, Pickpocket
- Harry Holman as Old Man Whose Pocket is Picked
- Tenen Holtz as Bail Bondsman
- Jack W. Johnston as Juror
- Florence Lake as Ticklish Girl
- Edwin Maxwell as Tom Ford
- Frank McGlynn Sr. as Good Book Charlie
- Clarence Muse as Voice of Singer
- J. Carrol Naish as Ed Harris
- Henry Otho as Charley in Bar/Man Pinched on Bridge
- Franklin Parker as Martell, a Newspaperman
- Bob Perry as Man on Bridge
- Buster Phelps as Dan as a Child
- Lee Phelps as Prison Jailer
- Fritzi Ridgeway as Miss Jessie
- Dick Rush as Detective
- Syd Saylor as Drunk Getting Socked
- Kathryn Sheldon as Jail Matron
- Nella Walker as Janet Reynolds
- Lucille Ward as Miss Clark from the Children's Welfare League
- Robert Warwick as Kelly
- Claudia Coleman as Tessie
- William A. Wellman (the director) as Reporter
- Charles Williams as Party Guest

== Production ==
The story rights were purchased by Warner Bros. (First National's parent company) in late August 1932. Originally produced under the title "Common Ground," filming began in early October 1932 and entered the editing room at the end of the month. It was reported to be one of several productions completed in three weeks of filming.

According to the pressbook, a replica of 1906 San Francisco was created at the First National studios, and the earthquake was replicated by using rollers and levers.

George Brent was originally slated to play Dan McAllister, but dropped out early into production to star in 42nd Street, being replaced by James Murray. Frisco Jenny was one of James Murray's first films after being sentenced to four months of hard labor and being released on parole, the press staged it as a comeback from his alcoholism and legal trouble.
