= Broken Dreams (1933 film) =

1933 film

- Directed by: Robert G. Vignola
- Written by: Maude Fulton; Olga Printzlau
- Produced by: Trem Carr; Monogram Pictures
- Starring: Randolph Scott; Martha Sleeper
- Cinematography: Robert Planck
- Edited by: Carl Pierson
- Distributed by: Monogram Pictures
- Release date: October 20, 1933
- Running time: 68 minutes; 7 reels
- Country: USA
- Language: English

Broken Dreams is a 1933 drama film, directed by Robert G. Vignola. It starred Randolph Scott and Martha Sleeper. It was produced and distributed by Monogram Pictures.

The film is preserved by the Library of Congress.

== Plot ==
Medical intern Robert Morley is distraught after his wife dies in childbirth. He's resentful of his new son and wants nothing to do with him. He leaves the child with his aunt and uncle and heads off to Europe to pursue medicine.

His aunt Hilda visits him when he returns 6 years later and brings his son Billy. The child thinks the aunt and uncle are his parents. He tells his fiance Martha to have lunch without him. He goes to his son’s 6th birthday party and enjoys his time with the boy. His fiancé meets the aunt and uncle and is not pleased that he has a son. They talk and he tells her how he lost his wife. They reconcile.

Later they discuss having children. She tells him she doesn’t want children. He tells her that a child would be a bond between them. She suggests they bring Billy to live with them.

He advises his aunt and uncle he wants the boy to live with him. The aunt and uncle refuse to give up the boy. Dr. Morley takes them to court. The judge grants him full custody of his son. Billy cries, not wanting to leave the only parents he’s ever known.

Billy goes to live with Dr. Morley and his wife. She feels threatened by Billy.

Billy works with his tutor to learn French. His father takes the afternoon off to take Billy to the zoo. Martha goes out and returns late. She tells Robert she feels left out. She promises to try harder with Billy. She buys Billy a small dog but it backfires as he’s not happy. The aunt and uncle visit him and bring him a cake and the dog he wanted.

Dr. Morley is called out of town for an emergency operation. Billy hides his food to give to the dog he’s now hiding in his room. He also lets his monkey into his room. He feeds them the cake. The tutor finds the monkey and runs to get the mother. Billy shows her the dog but has sent the monkey out the window.

Paul tells her the Robert has no time for her and that she should leave him. Paul tries to kiss her but she struggles against him. Billy sees this and tries to stop Paul, who shoves him and he hits his head. Billy has a concussion and is seriously hurt. Robert finds Martha packing. She tells him what happened with Paul. She’s leaving him so he can build a life with his son. The doctor tending to Billy tells Robert that Martha gave her blood to save the boy. Martha realizes that she is the boy’s mother and decides to stay.

A year later they all celebrate Billy’s 7th birthday, with his friends, his dog, and his monkey.

== Cast ==
- Randolph Scott as Dr. Robert Morley
- Martha Sleeper as Martha Morley
- Joseph Cawthorn as Pop John Miller
- Beryl Mercer as Mon, Hilda Miller
- Buster Phelps as Billy Morley
- Charlotte Merriam as Grace
- Martin Burton as Paul
- Adele St. Maur as Mam'selle
- Sidney Bracey as Hopkins
- Phyllis Lee as Nurse
- Clarence Geldart as Dr. Fleming
- E. J. Le Saint as Judge Harvey E. Blake
- Finis Barton as Gladys
- Sam Flint as Dr. Greenwood
- George Nash
- Bradley Page
