= The World Gone Mad =

1933 film by Christy Cabanne

- Directed by: Christy Cabanne
- Written by: Edward T. Lowe Jr.
- Produced by: Phil Goldstone; Larry Darmour
- Starring: Pat O'Brien; Evelyn Brent; Neil Hamilton
- Cinematography: Ira H. Morgan
- Edited by: Otis Garrett
- Production company: Majestic Pictures
- Distributed by: Capitol Film Exchange
- Release date: April 15, 1933
- Running time: 70 minutes
- Country: United States
- Language: English

The World Gone Mad (also released as The Public Be Hanged) is a 1933 American pre-Code crime film directed by Christy Cabanne and starring Pat O'Brien, Evelyn Brent and Neil Hamilton. It was made on a low-budget by the independent Majestic Pictures, a Poverty Row forerunner of Republic Pictures.

== Plot ==
When a district attorney who has been investigating a utility company's directors for fraud is suddenly killed, his wisecracking newspaperman friend (Pat O'Brien) gets curious. He and the upstanding new district attorney (Neil Hamilton) separately pursue the case. Cultivated but sinister businessmen, a shady nightclub owner specializing in "import and export", several beautiful young women always seen in evening gowns, a "Latin lover" type who reads Casanova and an abundance of suave men in evening dress provide eye-candy for the duration.

== Cast ==
- Pat O'Brien as Andy Terrell
- Evelyn Brent as Carlotta Lamont
- Neil Hamilton as Lionel Houston
- Mary Brian as Diane Cromwell
- Louis Calhern as Christopher Bruno (as Louis Calhearn)
- J. Carrol Naish as Ramon Salvadore
- Buster Phelps as Ralph Henderson
- Richard Tucker as Graham Gaines
- John St. Polis as Grover Cromwell
- Geneva Mitchell as Evelyn Henderson
- Wallis Clark as Dist. Atty. Avery Henderson
- Huntley Gordon as Osborne
