= Buster Phelps =

American actor

- Born: November 5, 1926; Los Angeles, California
- Died: January 10, 1983 (aged 56); Los Angeles, California
- Occupation: Actor
- Years active: 1930-1949

Buster Phelps (November 5, 1926 – January 10, 1983) was an American actor. He was born and died in Los Angeles.

== Career ==
Phelps debuted on film when he was a child. When the mother of another child had booked two simultaneous film sessions for that youngster, she contacted Phelps' mother about taking one of the roles. In 1932, he was signed to portray Mickey, Annie's young orphaned friend and protege, in the film Little Orphan Annie.

Phelps also appeared in the films The Sin of Madelon Claudet, Stepping Sisters, A Fool's Advice, Scandal for Sale, Three on a Match, Handle with Care, Frisco Jenny, Sailor's Luck, The World Gone Mad, Laughing at Life, One Man's Journey, Night Flight, Broken Dreams, Servants' Entrance, Strange Wives, Little Men, Anna Karenina, The Affair of Susan, Too Many Parents, Libeled Lady, The Howards of Virginia, Slightly Tempted, And the Angels Sing and Mother Is a Freshman, among others.

== Partial filmography ==
- Night Work (1930) - Orphan (uncredited)
- Feet First (1930) - Little Boy (uncredited)
- Left Over Ladies (1931) - Buddy
- The Sin of Madelon Claudet (1931) - Larry Claudet - Toddler (uncredited)
- Stepping Sisters (1932) - Germany (uncredited)
- A Fool's Advice (1932) - Buster the Kid
- Scandal for Sale (1932) - Bobby Strong
- Three on a Match (1932) - Robert Kirkwood Jr.
- Little Orphan Annie (1932) - Mickey
- Handle with Care (1932) - Tommy
- Frisco Jenny (1932) - Dan as a Child (uncredited)
- Sailor's Luck (1933) - Elmer Brown Jr.
- The World Gone Mad (1933) - Ralph Henderson
- Laughing at Life (1933) - Young Pat 'Denny' McHale
- One Man's Journey (1933) - Jimmy Watt - Age 6
- Night Flight (1933) - Sick Child
- Broken Dreams (1933) - Billy Morley
- Now and Forever (1934) - Boy With Skates (uncredited)
- Servants' Entrance (1934) - Tommy
- Strange Wives (1934) - Twin
- Little Men (1934) - Dick
- Anna Karenina (1935) - Grisha
- The Affair of Susan (1935) - Hogan Jr. (uncredited)
- I Live My Life (1935) - Child at Christmas Party (uncredited)
- Too Many Parents (1936) - Clinton Meadows
- Libeled Lady (1936) - Waif (uncredited)
- Girl Loves Boy (1937) - Ned McCarthy
- Little Tough Guy (1938) - Kid (uncredited)
- Big Town Czar (1939) - Boy (uncredited)
- Hero for a Day (1939) - First Boy (uncredited)
- The Blue Bird (1940) - Boy Inventor (uncredited)
- The Howards of Virginia (1940) - Tom Jefferson at 11
- Slightly Tempted (1940) - Ray (uncredited)
- Meet the Chump (1940) - Newsboy (uncredited)
- The Wagons Roll at Night (1941) - Boy (uncredited)
- And the Angels Sing (1944) - Spud (uncredited)
- Tomorrow Is Forever (1946) - Fraternity Boy (uncredited)
- Mother Is a Freshman (1949) - Jack (uncredited) (final film role)
