= Little Orphan Annie (1932 film) =

1932 film

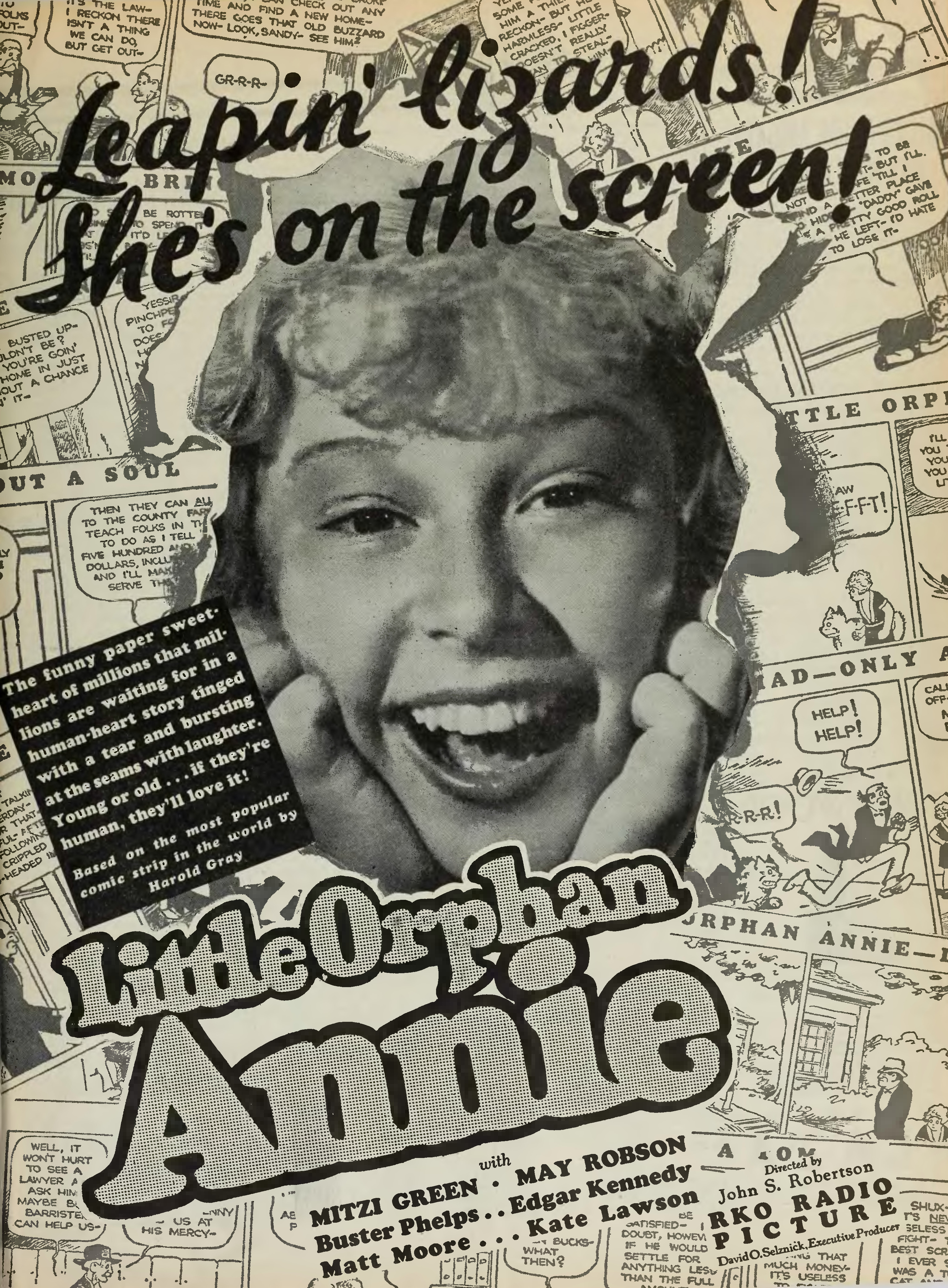
- Directed by: John S. Robertson
- Written by: Tom McNamara; Wanda Tuchock
- Based on: Little Orphan Annie by Harold Gray
- Produced by: David O. Selznick
- Starring: Mitzi Green; Buster Phelps; May Robson; Matt Moore; Edgar Kennedy
- Cinematography: Jack MacKenzie
- Edited by: George Hively
- Music by: Max Steiner
- Production company: RKO Pictures
- Distributed by: RKO Pictures
- Release date: November 4, 1932
- Running time: 60 minutes
- Country: United States
- Language: English

Little Orphan Annie is a 1932 American pre-Code comedy film directed by John S. Robertson, and written by Wanda Tuchock and Tom McNamara. It is based on the comic strip Little Orphan Annie by Harold Gray. The film stars Mitzi Green, Buster Phelps, May Robson, Matt Moore, and Edgar Kennedy. The film was released on November 4, 1932, by RKO Pictures.

== Plot ==
As Oliver "Daddy" Warbucks leaves town to find gold, Annie and Sandy find a little boy named Mickey, crying behind a fence. Mickey is upset because his grandmother died, and he is being forced to go to an orphanage. Annie talks to Mickey about her own experience of being in an orphanage, and after she leaves, Mickey sneaks out the orphanage and follows Annie. He then stops to eat an apple from an apple vendor, who then scolds Mickey and Annie.

Annie, Mickey, and Sandy seek shelter from the rain back at Annie's home. Annie then proceeds to make pig's feet for Mickey, and puts Mickey to bed inside Daddy Warbucks' bedroom. While asleep, Mickey dreams about a pig who is trying to find Mickey because he ate his feet. After a loud clap of thunder wakes Mickey up, he rushes over to Annie, crying about his grandmother. Annie then promises Mickey that she'll find someone like Mickey's grandmother first thing tomorrow.

The next day, Annie takes Mickey to the Helping Hand Orphanage, where Annie believes they will help Mickey find a new grandmother. Mickey is suffering from a puffed up stomach. Mrs. Bergen then begins to take Mickey to Dr. Griffith's office. He kicks and screams for Annie to follow him. Griffith arrived to examine Mickey, and gives him Castor Oil to help his stomach. Mickey does not want to take it until Annie tries it. She takes a spoonful, wincing at the awful taste, which Mickey then proceeds to take the spoonful of Caster Oil. As Annie proceeds to leave, Griffith, Mrs. Bergen, and Mickey beg her to stay, but Annie refuses. The three chase her around the office, ending with Annie tripping on the Doctor's chair, spinning around and getting sick. She then agrees to stay at the orphanage.

As Annie becomes a helper at the orphanage, Mrs. Stewart arrives to adopt a child. Annie cleans Mickey up to look good for Stewart, but one of the orphans slaps Mickey's cheek with shoe blackening. To Annie's anger, she tries to clean Mickey's face, but due to late timing, she takes Mickey with the orphans to introduce themselves to Stewart. The orphans begin to walk around her until she halts at Mickey, who still has shoe blackening on his face. Annie explains the incident, and Stewart becomes uninterested in adopting Mickey. Annie then starts an argument at Mickey for stressing her, but it's all an act for Mickey to be adopted. After Annie's "argument", Stewart adopts Mickey, but Mickey does not say goodbye to Annie, which breaks her heart. She tries to apologize to him, but he leaves.

In the evening, Mickey is happily enjoying his new home. After Mrs. Stewart tucks him to bed, he notices Annie sitting in a tree outside his bedroom window. She apologizes to Mickey for earlier, as Mickey tearfully talks to her about how he does not like his new grandmother. Mickey forgives Annie, and brings her and Sandy inside his home, where he shows Annie his collection of toys inside his room. Soon after, Annie and Sandy start to put on a show for Mickey, while he sets score via a music box. Sandy performs tricks while Annie does an impression of The Marx Brothers.

In the dining room, Mrs. Stewart throws a dinner party with some of her friends. Stewart's butler walks to the kitchen to find Stewart's roast beef gone, as Sandy was the one who ate it earlier. While Annie is doing more impressions to entertain Mickey as Stewart, Mickey is escorted to bed, putting Sandy in his closet to hide, until Stewart finds Annie in the living room. As she kicks Annie and Sandy out, Mickey runs upstairs to his bedroom window, crying to Annie, but before Stewart catches him, Mickey falls out the window, badly injuring himself.

The next day, feeling very upset from Mickey's accident, Annie blames herself for letting Mrs. Stewart adopt Mickey, saying if she did not adopt him, he would not have gotten hurt. Stewart blames herself, knowing that Mickey and Annie were very close. The two console each other. Luckily, Mickey recovers from the accident with the help of a brace given by Dr. Griffith.

On Christmas Day, Mrs. Stewart throws a Christmas party, where Annie and Sandy attend with all the other orphans. As Santa Claus gives out presents to the orphans, Annie walks up to him, Santa asks what Annie would like, and she demands a hug and kiss, ripping Santa's hat and beard off, revealing that Santa is actually Daddy Warbucks. The two happily share an embrace, and everyone has Christmas dinner.

== Cast ==
- Mitzi Green as Annie Warbucks
- Buster Phelps as Mickey
- May Robson as Mrs. Stewart
- Matt Moore as Dr. Griffith
- Edgar Kennedy as Daddy Warbucks
- Kate Drain Lawson as Mrs. Bergen
- Sidney Bracey as Butler

== Release ==
The film was initially released as a holiday special for children being shown at matinée performances only.

== Reception ==
Variety was not that impressed with the film calling it "Okay as a good-will offering on the bottom half of a double header" and that the "story is so shallow it's a pity", however, they were impressed with Phelps.

== Home media ==
- An HD remaster of the film was included in the Columbia Classics Collection: Volume 3 box set as a bonus feature for the 1982 musical film adaptation.
