= Finn and Hattie =

1931 film

- Directed by: Norman Z. McLeod (as Norman McLeod); Norman Taurog
- Written by: Joseph L. Mankiewicz
- Based on: novel Mr and Mrs Haddock Abroad by Donald Ogden Stewart
- Starring: Leon Errol; ZaSu Pitts
- Cinematography: Dev Jennings
- Distributed by: Paramount Pictures
- Release date: February 28, 1931
- Running time: 78 minutes
- Country: United States
- Language: English
- Budget: $250,000

Finn and Hattie is a 1931 American comedic pre-Code film directed by Norman Taurog, starring Leon Errol, Mitzi Green and ZaSu Pitts.

== Production ==
The film was based on a book Mr and Mrs Haddock Abroad by Donald Ogden Stewart. He later said "the first thing I knew about it was Joe [Mankiewicz] coming to me to apologize for it because it wasn’t Mr. and Mrs. Haddock Abroad as I had written it or as I saw it, but largely a vehicle for Leon Errol to do the many very funny things he used to do with his legs and with dialogue. They had just ruined the whole spirit of the Haddocks, and when I saw it I quietly tiptoed out of the theatre."
