= Junior Durkin =

American actor (1915–1935)

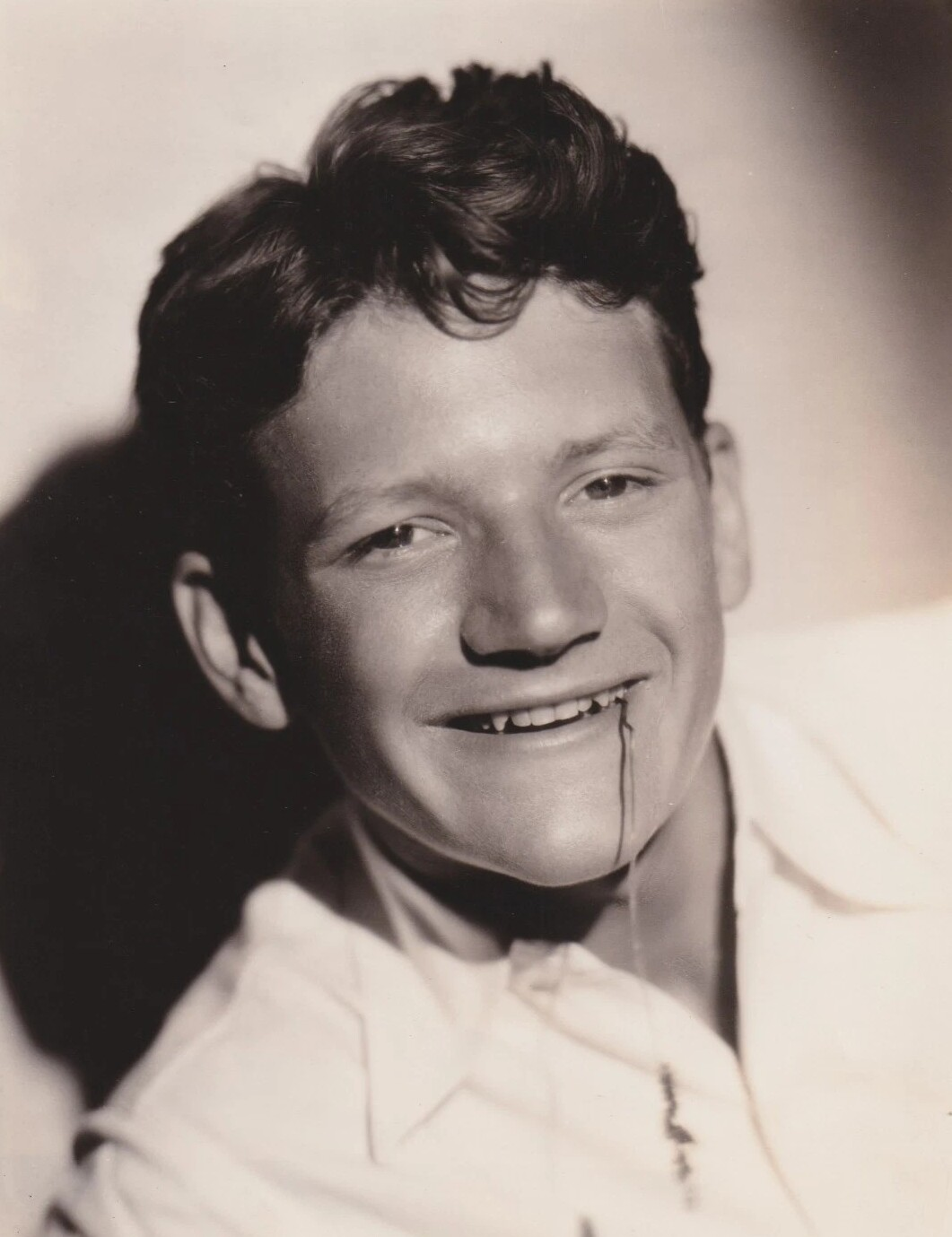
- Durkin in Tom Sawyer (1930)
- Born: Trent Bernard Durkin; July 2, 1915; New York City, U.S.
- Died: May 4, 1935 (aged 19); San Diego, California, U.S.
- Resting place: Forest Lawn Memorial Park Cemetery, Glendale, California, U.S.
- Other names: Junior Dirkin; Trent Durkin
- Occupation: Actor
- Years active: 1923–1935

Trent "Junior" Durkin (July 2, 1915 – May 4, 1935) was an American stage and film actor.

== Career ==
Trent Bernard Durkin was born in New York City in 1915. He began his acting career in theater as a child. Durkin first appeared in films in 1930, playing the role of Huckleberry Finn in Tom Sawyer (1930) and in Huckleberry Finn (1931), both times with Jackie Coogan playing Tom Sawyer. Under contract to RKO Radio Pictures, he was cast in a series of "B" films in comedy roles that capitalized on his gangly appearance. He co-starred in Hell's House (1932) with then newcomer Bette Davis.

RKO began grooming him for more adult roles. In his final film, Chasing Yesterday (1935) starring Anne Shirley, he was billed as Trent Durkin.

== Death ==
In 1935, Durkin was returning from a hunting trip in Mexico with Jackie Coogan and three others: Coogan's father John Henry Coogan Jr., Charles Jones (manager of the Coogan Ranch) and writer Robert Horner. Coogan's father had to swerve to avoid colliding with a car coming straight at him, and his car left the road, rolling repeatedly until it landed in a creek bed. The accident occurred about 50 miles (80 km) from San Diego, California. Jackie Coogan was the only survivor.

At the time, Durkin was living with agent Henry Willson, and they were rumored to be lovers. In a 2013 interview, former child star Diana Serra Cary (known as Baby Peggy), a close friend of Durkin, said, "It would not surprise me to know that Trent was gay. However, in the early thirties it would have been suicidal for such a promising young actor to come out of the closet. Especially without the protection of a strong producer, or already under contract to MGM, with studio head Louis B. Mayer seriously invested in his future success as a leading man."

Durkin was interred in the Forest Lawn Memorial Park Cemetery in Glendale, California.

== Filmography ==
| Year | Title | Role | Notes |
|---|---|---|---|
| 1930 | Recaptured Love | Henry Parr | credited as Bernard Durkin |
| 1930 | The Santa Fe Trail | Old Timer | credited as Bernard Durkin |
| 1930 | Tom Sawyer | Huckleberry Finn | |
| 1931 | Huckleberry Finn | Huckleberry Finn | |
| 1932 | Hell's House | Jimmy Mason | alternative title: Juvenile Court credited as Junior Dirkin |
| 1933 | Man Hunt | William 'Junior' Scott, Jr. | |
| 1934 | Big Hearted Herbert | Junior Kalness | credited as Trent Durkin |
| 1934 | Ready for Love | Joey Burke | |
| 1934 | Little Men | Franz | |
| 1935 | Chasing Yesterday | Henri | credited as Trent Durkin, final film role |
