= Mitzi Green =

American child actress (1920–1969)

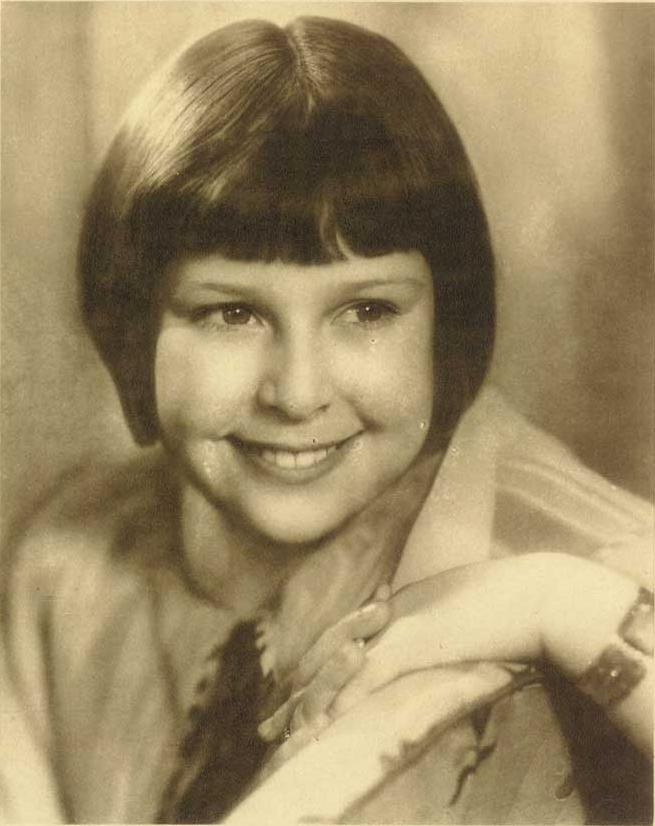
- Green in 1932
- Born: Elizabeth Keno; October 22, 1920; New York City, U.S.
- Died: May 24, 1969 (aged 48); Huntington Beach, California, U.S.
- Resting place: Eden Memorial Park Cemetery, Mission Hills, California
- Occupations: Actress, singer
- Years active: 1929–1955
- Spouse: Joseph Pevney (m. 1942)
- Children: 4

Mitzi Green (born Elizabeth Keno; October 22, 1920 – May 24, 1969) was an American actress and singer known for her work as a child actress for Paramount and RKO, in the early "talkies" era. She then acted on Broadway and in other stage works, as well as in films and on television.

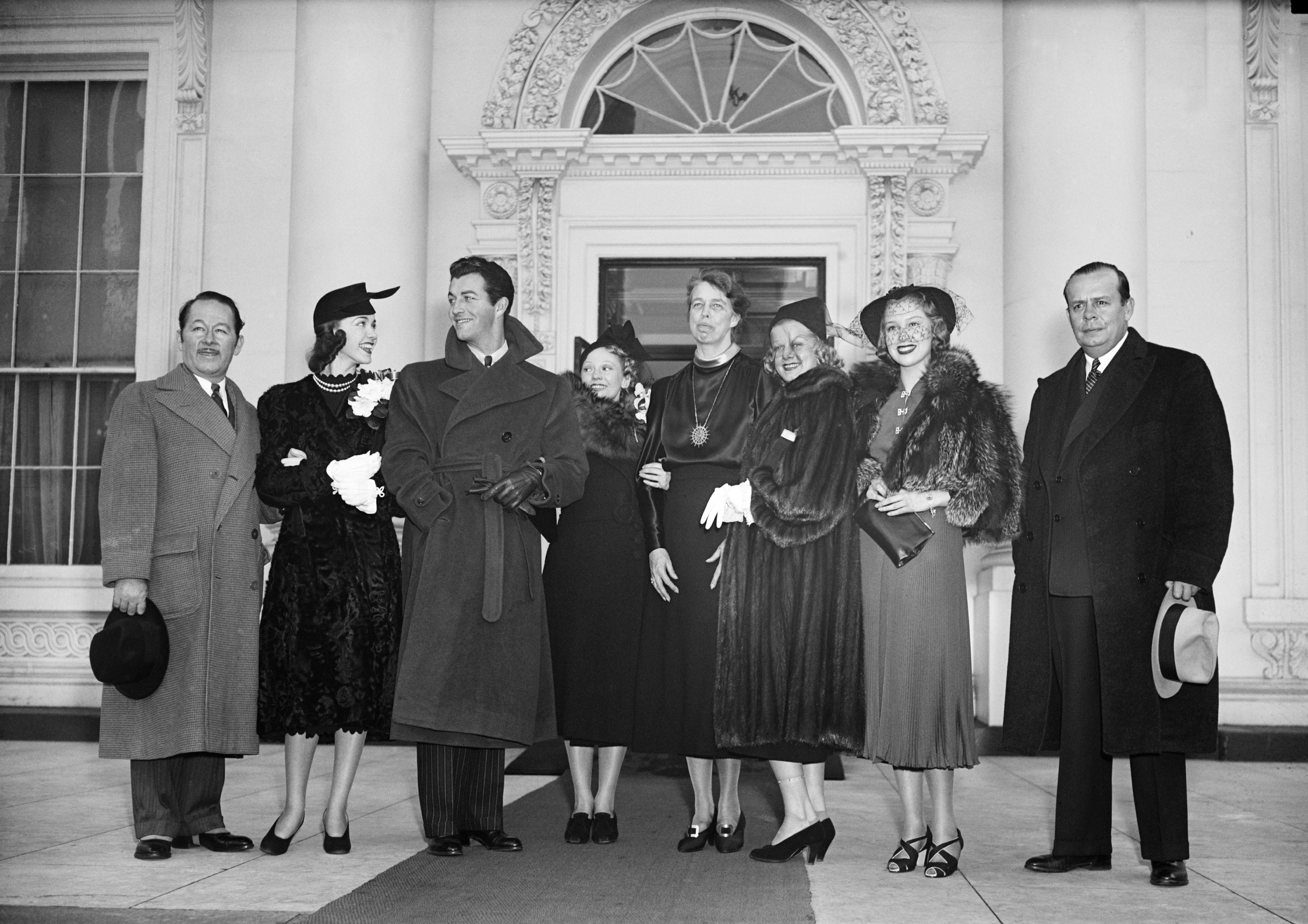
Celebrities including Frederick Jagel, Marsha Hunt, Robert Taylor, Jean Harlow and Mitzi Green (second from right) were invited to Washington, D.C., to assist with President's Birthday Ball fundraising activities (January 30, 1937).

== Early years ==
Mitzi Green was born in The Bronx on October 22, 1920, to a Jewish couple, vaudeville performers Joe Keno and Rosie Green. Starting at the age 3, she began appearing in her parents' vaudeville act under the name Little Mitzi.

== Career ==
Green was often featured in Paramount's early talkies, as an outspoken and mischievous little girl alongside studio stars Clara Bow, Jack Oakie, Ed Wynn, Leon Errol, and Edna May Oliver among others. Green was a gifted mimic and her celebrity imitations were often worked into the films. She was cast (against type) opposite Jackie Coogan in two Mark Twain adaptations, Tom Sawyer (1930) and Huckleberry Finn (1931). Paramount released her in 1931, as she was rapidly outgrowing child roles.

She moved to RKO for two pictures, both adaptations of works from other media. She played the title role in Little Orphan Annie (1932), based on the popular comic strip, with Edgar Kennedy as Daddy Warbucks. She also appeared as the precocious kid sister in Girl Crazy (1932), the first movie version of the George Gershwin-Ira Gershwin stage musical. Green brightened the film with surprising impersonations of George Arliss and her former co-star Edna May Oliver.

At the age of 14, she played a soubrette role in Transatlantic Merry-Go-Round (1934), produced independently by Edward Small for United Artists release. It did not result in further film offers, and Green left Hollywood.

She went on to Broadway, where she starred in the original production of Rodgers and Hart's Babes in Arms (1937). Two of Green's numbers in the musical were "My Funny Valentine," which would later become a jazz standard in many cover recordings and performances, and "The Lady Is a Tramp".

Green made one more film in 1940 (Santa Fe Trail with Errol Flynn), then went back to stage and nightclub work, including Walk with Music by Hoagy Carmichael and Johnny Mercer, and the Betty Comden and Adolph Green musical Billion Dollar Baby. Green married Broadway (and later movie and TV) director Joseph Pevney and retired to raise a family. At age 31 she returned briefly to the screen opposite Abbott and Costello in Lost in Alaska (1952) and in Bloodhounds of Broadway (1952), co-starring another Mitzi—Mitzi Gaynor.

In 1955, she starred with Virginia Gibson and Gordon Jones in the short-lived NBC TV sitcom So This Is Hollywood, in the role of Queenie Dugan, a high-spirited stuntwoman.

After a brief stint on the nightclub circuit, Green retired again, although she did appear in summer stock and dinner theater around the Los Angeles area thereafter, and she appeared occasionally as a guest on talk shows.

On radio, Green starred in Passport to Romance, a program "spiced with music and comedy", which premiered on the Mutual Broadcasting System on April 5, 1946.

== Recognition ==
For her contributions to the motion picture industry, Green received a star on the Hollywood Walk of Fame at 6430 Hollywood Blvd.

== Personal life and death ==
Green married film director Joseph Pevney. They had four children including son Jeff, who performed in the film Gypsy (1962). On May 24, 1969, Green died in Huntington Beach, California, at age 48, of cancer.

== Partial filmography ==
Year	Film	Role	Director	Notes
1929	The Marriage Playground	Zinnie Wheater	Lothar Mendes	
1930	Honey	Doris	Wesley Ruggles	
1930	Paramount on Parade	Herself – Episode 'Park in Paris'	Edmund Goulding and 10 other directors	
1930	Love Among the Millionaires	Penelope 'Penny' Whipple	Frank Tuttle	
1930	The Santa Fe Trail	Emily	Edwin H. Knopf	
1930	Tom Sawyer	Becky Thatcher	John Cromwell	
1930	Follow the Leader		Albert Parker	
1931	Finn and Hattie	Mildred Haddock	Norman Taurog	
1931	Skippy	Eloise	Norman Taurog	
1931	Dude Ranch	Alice Merridew	Frank Tuttle	
1931	Newly Rich	Daisy Tate	Norman Taurog	
1931	Huckleberry Finn	Becky Thatcher	Norman Taurog	
1931	The Slippery Pearls	Herself	William C. McGann	
1932	Girl Crazy	Tessie Deegan	William A. Seiter	
1932	Little Orphan Annie	Annie	Charles Kerr (assistant)	
1934	Transatlantic Merry-Go-Round	Mitzi	Benjamin Stoloff	
1940	Santa Fe Trail	Girl at Wedding (uncredited)	Michael Curtiz	
1952	Lost in Alaska	Rosette	Jean Yarbrough	
1952	Bloodhounds of Broadway	'52nd Tessie' Sammis	Harmon Jones	

== Stage ==
- Babes in Arms (1937)
- Walk with Music (1940)
- Let Freedom Sing (1942)
- Billion Dollar Baby (1945)

== Bibliography ==
- Best, Marc. Those Endearing Young Charms: Child Performers of the Screen (South Brunswick and New York: Barnes & Co., 1971), pp. 100–104.
