= Jackie Coogan =

American actor (1914–1984)

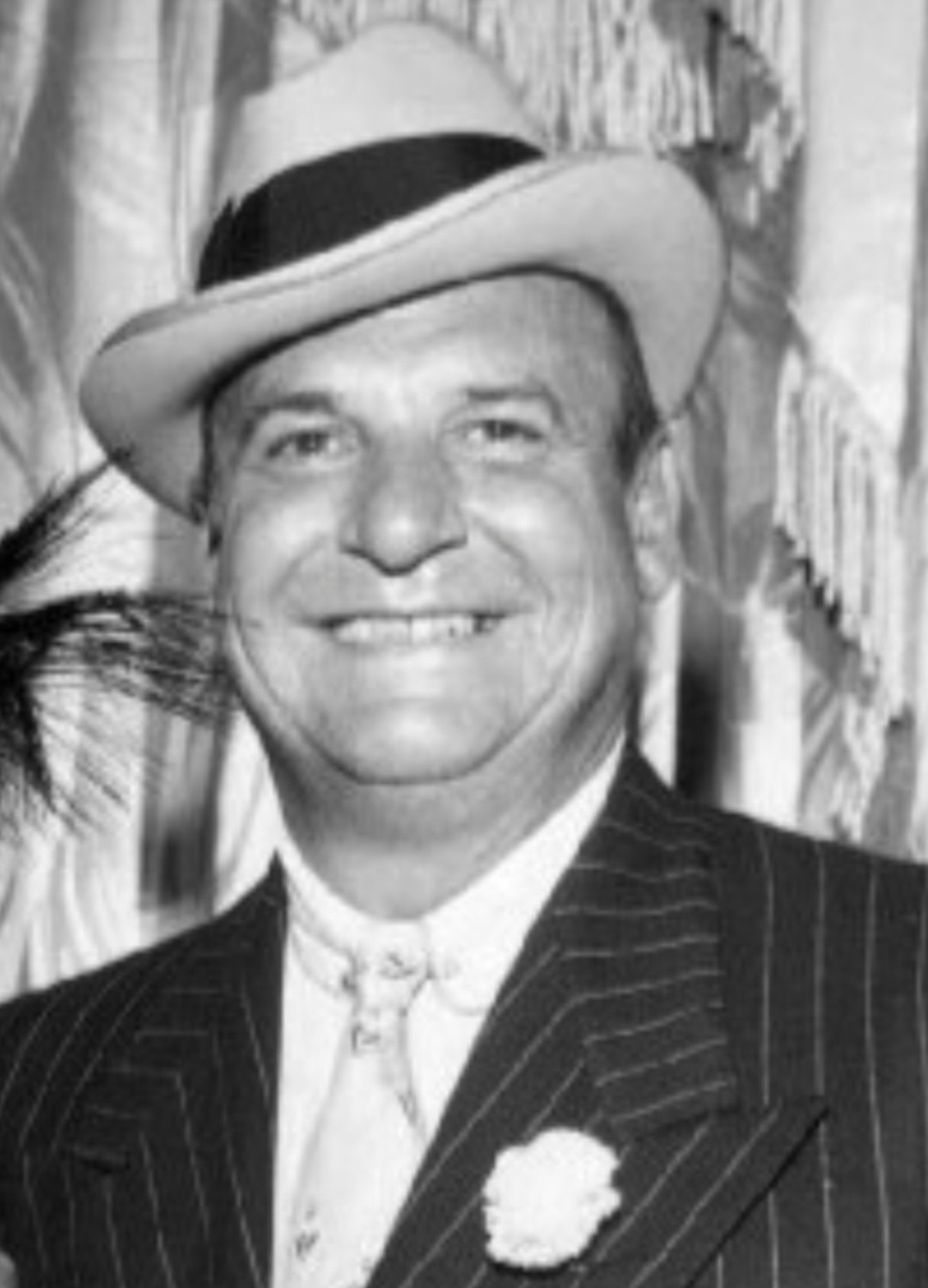
- Coogan in 1962
- Born: John Leslie Coogan; October 26, 1914; Los Angeles, California, U.S.
- Died: March 1, 1984 (aged 69); Santa Monica, California, U.S.
- Burial place: Holy Cross Cemetery, Culver City
- Occupations: Actor; comedian
- Years active: 1917–1984
- Spouses: Betty Grable (m. 1937; div. 1939) Flower Parry (m. 1941; div. 1943) Ann McCormack (m. 1946; div. 1951) Dorothea Lamphere (m. 1952)
- Children: 4
- Relatives: Robert Coogan (brother); Jonathan Coogan (nephew) Keith Coogan (grandson)

John Leslie Coogan (October 26, 1914 – March 1, 1984) was an American actor and comedian who began his film career as a child actor in silent films. Coogan's title role in Charlie Chaplin's film The Kid (1921) made him one of the first child stars in the history of Hollywood.

He later sued his mother and stepfather over his squandered film earnings and inspired California to enact the first known legal protection for the earnings of child performers, the California Child Actor's Bill, widely known as the "Coogan Act".

Coogan continued to act throughout his life, later earning renewed fame in middle age portraying Uncle Fester in the 1960s television series The Addams Family.

== Early life and education ==
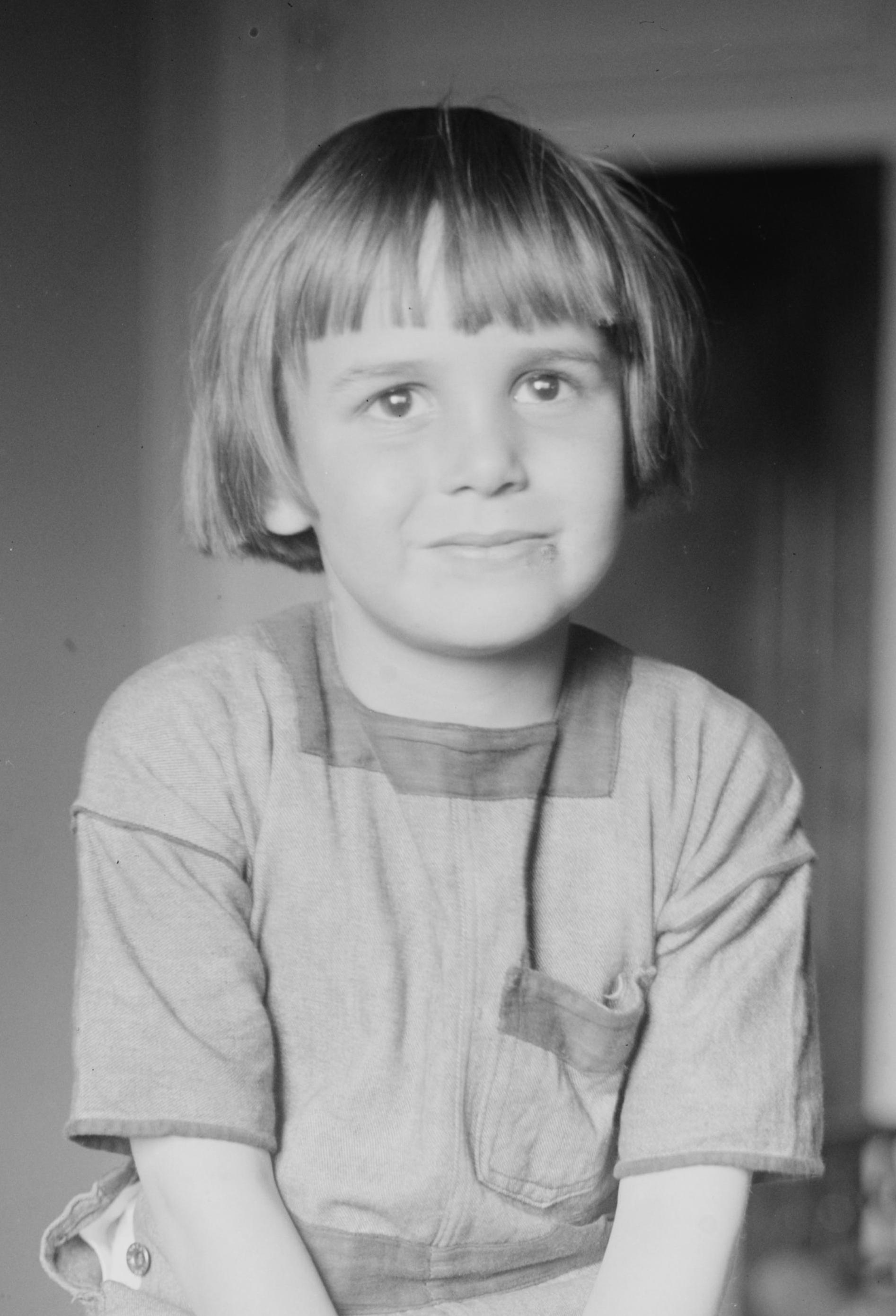
Coogan c. 1921

John Leslie Coogan was born in Los Angeles, California, in 1914 to John Henry Jr. and Lillian Rita (née Dolliver) Coogan. He began performing as an infant in both vaudeville and film, with the title role (uncredited) in the 1917 film Skinner's Baby. Charlie Chaplin discovered him in the Orpheum Theatre, a vaudeville house in Los Angeles, on the stage doing the shimmy, a then-popular dance. Coogan's father was also an actor.

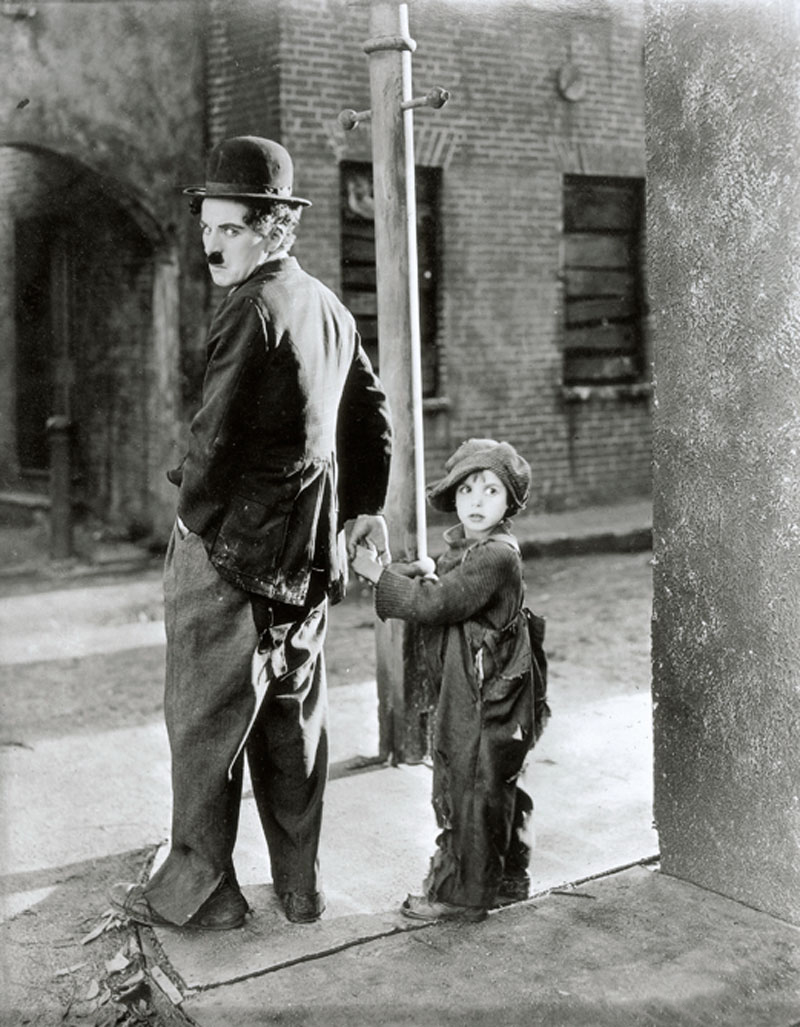
Coogan and Chaplin in The Kid (1921)

Coogan was a natural mimic and delighted Chaplin with his abilities. Chaplin cast him in a small role in A Day's Pleasure (1919). The following year, Chaplin cast Coogan as the abandoned child raised by his Tramp character in the silent comedy-drama The Kid (1921). In 1922, Coogan was cast in the title role in Oliver Twist, directed by Frank Lloyd. Coogan was one of the first stars to be heavily merchandised. Peanut butter, stationery, whistles, dolls, records, coins, and figurines were among the Coogan-themed merchandise on sale.

Coogan had been privately tutored until the age of 10 and then sent to a military academy and prep schools until he was 16. He entered Santa Clara University in 1932, flunked out, and transferred to the University of Southern California, intending to obtain a business or law degree.

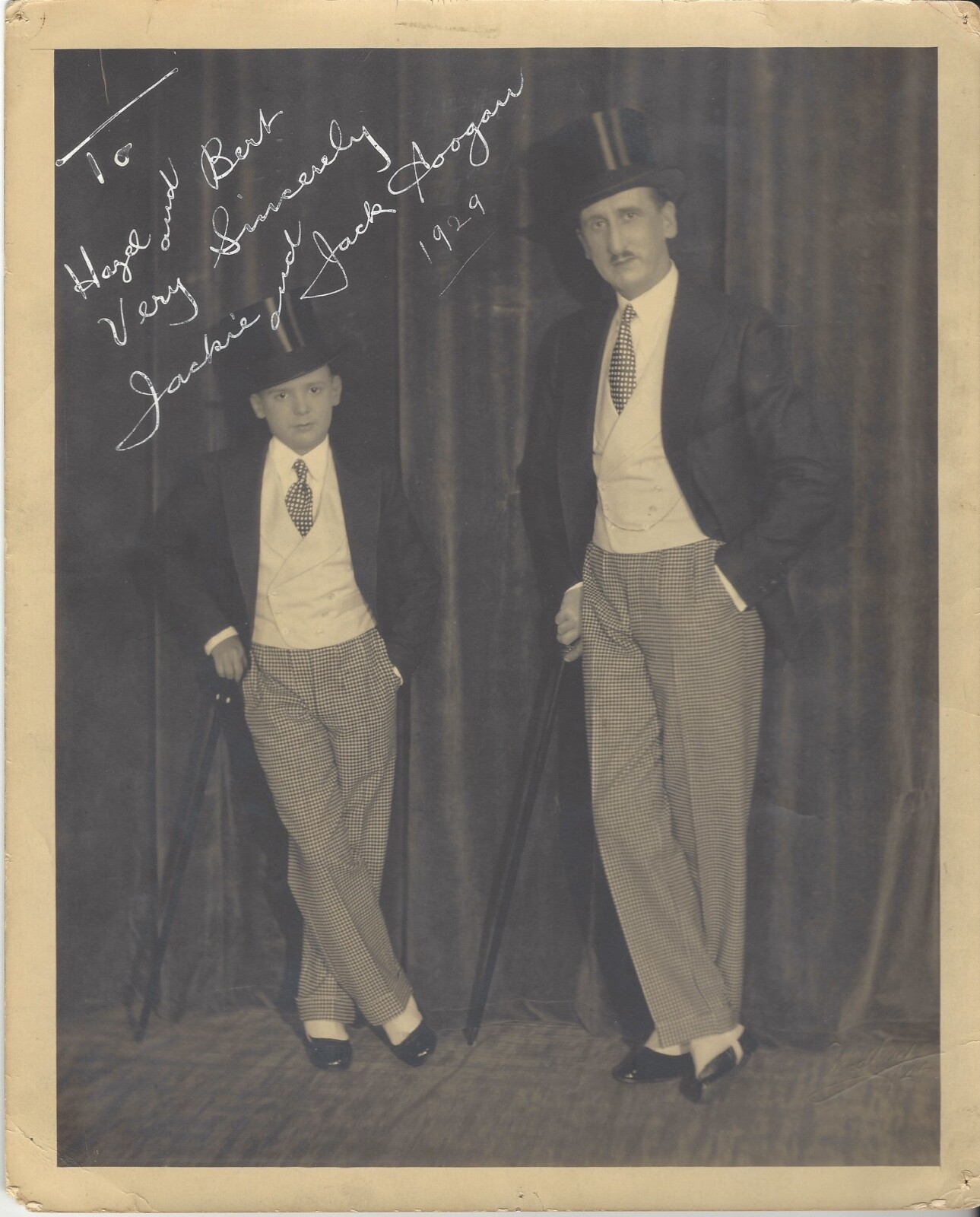
Jackie and Jack Coogan (1929)

On May 4, 1935, 20-year-old Coogan was the sole survivor of a car crash on the winding San Diego-Imperial Valley Highway, in eastern San Diego County that killed his father, his 19-year-old best friend, actor Trent ("Junior") Durkin, their ranch foreman Charles Jones, and actor and writer Robert J. Horner. The party was returning from a day of dove hunting just over the Mexican border. With Coogan's father at the wheel, the car was forced off the mountain highway near Pine Valley by an oncoming vehicle and rolled down an embankment. Durkin had been a costar of Coogan's in the Tom Sawyer and Huckleberry Finn films. Jackie, who had been thrown from the rumble seat, suffered two broken ribs and bruises.

== Charity work ==
While a child actor, Coogan worked with Near East Relief and toured across the United States and Europe in 1924 on a "Children's Crusade" as part of his fundraising drive. His efforts provided more than $1 million in clothing, food, and other contributions ($14.8 million in 2021 dollars), and he was honored by officials in the United States and Greece. He also had an audience with Pope Pius XI.

A Catholic, Coogan was a member of the Good Shepherd Parish and the Catholic Motion Picture Guild in Beverly Hills.

== Coogan Act ==
As a child star, Coogan earned an estimated $3,000,000 (equivalent to $70,449,000 in 2025) to $4,000,000 (equivalent to $93,932,000 in 2025). When he turned 21 in October 1935, his fortune was believed to be well intact. His assets had been conservatively managed by his father, who had died in a car accident five months earlier.

Coogan soon discovered, though, that nearly the entire amount had been squandered by his mother and stepfather, Arthur Bernstein, on fur coats, diamonds and other jewelry, and expensive cars. Bernstein had been a financial advisor for the family and married Coogan's mother in late 1936.

Coogan's mother and stepfather claimed Jackie enjoyed himself and simply thought he was playing before the camera. She insisted, "No promises were ever made to give Jackie anything", and claimed he "was a bad boy".

Coogan sued them in 1938, but after his legal expenses, he received just $126,000 (equivalent to $2,882,000 in 2025) of the $250,000 (equivalent to $5,718,000 in 2025) remaining of his earnings. When Coogan went broke during the litigation, he asked Charlie Chaplin for assistance; Chaplin handed him $1,000 (equivalent to $23,000 in 2025) in cash without hesitation.

The legal battle focused attention on child actors and resulted in the 1939 enactment of the California Child Actor's Bill, often referred to as the "Coogan Law" or the "Coogan Act". It required that a child actor's employer set aside 15% of the earnings in a trust (called a Coogan account) and specified the actor's schooling, work hours, and time off.

== Adult career ==
=== Film ===
Coogan appeared with then-wife Betty Grable in College Swing, a 1938 musical comedy starring George Burns, Gracie Allen, Martha Raye, and Bob Hope.

In 1960, Coogan appeared in the ensemble comedy Sex Kittens Go to College with Mamie Van Doren and others. Coincidentaly, Charles Chaplin Jr. and Harold Lloyd Jr., both of whose fathers Coogan acted with in films decades earlier, have uncredited cameos in the film.

He appeared as a police officer in the Elvis Presley comedy Girl Happy in 1965.

=== Radio ===
In 1940, Coogan played the role of "a playboy Broadway producer" in the Society Girl program on CBS radio. He also starred in his own program, Forever Ernest, on CBS from April 29 to July 22, 1946.

=== World War II ===
Coogan enlisted in the U.S. Army in March 1941. After the attack on Pearl Harbor that December, he requested a transfer to Army Air Forces as a glider pilot because of his civilian flying experience. He graduated from the Advanced Glider School with the glider pilot aeronautical rating and the rank of flight officer, and volunteered for hazardous duty with the 1st Air Commando Group.

In December 1943, the unit was sent to India. He flew British troops, the Chindits, under General Orde Wingate, on March 5, 1944, landing them at night in a small jungle clearing 100 miles (160 km) behind Japanese lines in the Burma Campaign.

=== Television ===
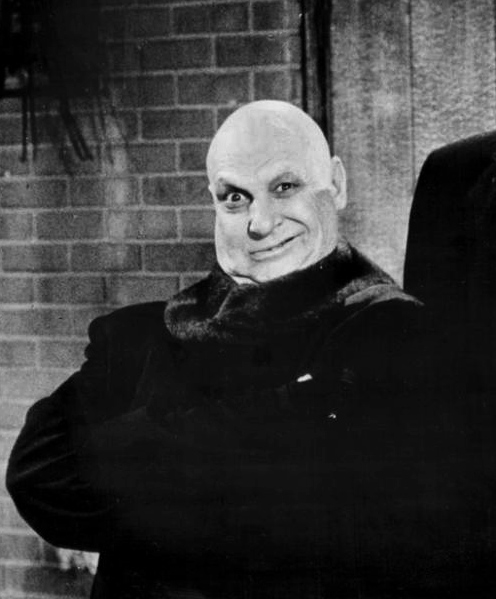
Coogan in a publicity shot as the character Uncle Fester for The Addams Family TV series

After the war, Coogan returned to acting, taking mostly character roles and appearing on television.

From 1952 to 1953, Coogan played Stoney Crockett on the syndicated series Cowboy G-Men. In 1959, he guest-starred in a first-season episode of Peter Gunn. He also appeared on NBC's The Martha Raye Show. He appeared, too, as Corbett, in two episodes of NBC's 1960 series Outlaws.

In the 1960–1961 season, he guest-starred in the episode "The Damaged Dolls" of the crime drama The Brothers Brannagan. In 1961, he guest-starred in an episode of The Americans, an NBC series about family divisions stemming from the Civil War. He also appeared in episode 37, titled "Barney on the Rebound", of The Andy Griffith Show, which aired October 31, 1961.

Coogan had a regular role in a 1962–63 NBC series, McKeever and the Colonel. He finally found his most famous television role as Uncle Fester in ABC's The Addams Family (1964–1966). He later voiced Uncle Fester in The Addams Family animated series (1973–1975) and reprised the character in the TV film Halloween with the New Addams Family (1977).

He appeared four times on the Perry Mason series, including the role of political activist Gus Sawyer in the 1963 episode, "The Case of the Witless Witness" and TV prop man Pete Desmond in the final episode, "The Case of the Final Fadeout", in 1966. He was a guest several times on The Red Skelton Show, appeared twice on The Brady Bunch ("The Fender Benders" and "Double Parked"), I Dream of Jeannie (as Jeannie's uncle, Suleiman – Maharaja of Basenji), Family Affair, Here's Lucy, and The Brian Keith Show, and continued to guest-star on television, including multiple appearances on The Partridge Family, The Wild Wild West, Hawaii Five-O and McMillan and Wife, until his retirement in the mid-1970s. Coogan also appeared in the first season of Barnaby Jones, in the April 1, 1973, episode titled "Sing a Song of Murder".

== Personal life ==
Coogan was married four times and had four children. His first three marriages to actresses were short-lived. Betty Grable and he were engaged in 1935 and married on November 20, 1937, and they divorced on October 11, 1939. On August 10, 1941, he married Flower Parry (d. 1981). They had one son, John Anthony Coogan (writer/producer of 3D digital and film, also known as Jackie Coogan Jr.), born in Los Angeles; they divorced on June 29, 1943. Coogan married his third wife, Ann McCormack, on December 26, 1946. A daughter, Joann Dolliver Coogan, was born in Los Angeles. They divorced on September 20, 1951.

Dorothea Odetta Hanson, also known as Dorothea Lamphere (but best known as Dodie), was a dancer and became Coogan's fourth wife in April 1952. They were together over 30 years until his death in 1984. She died in 1999. They had two children together; daughter Leslie Diane Coogan was born in Los Angeles, while son Christopher Fenton Coogan was born in Riverside County, California. Christopher died in a motorcycle accident in Palm Springs, California in 1990.

Leslie Coogan has a son, actor Keith Coogan, who was born Keith Eric Mitchell. He began acting in 1975 and later changed his name two years after his grandfather's death, in 1986. His roles include the oldest son in Adventures in Babysitting and Don't Tell Mom the Babysitter's Dead.

Footage of Coogan with his grandson Keith can be seen in the 1982 documentary Hollywood's Children.

== Death ==
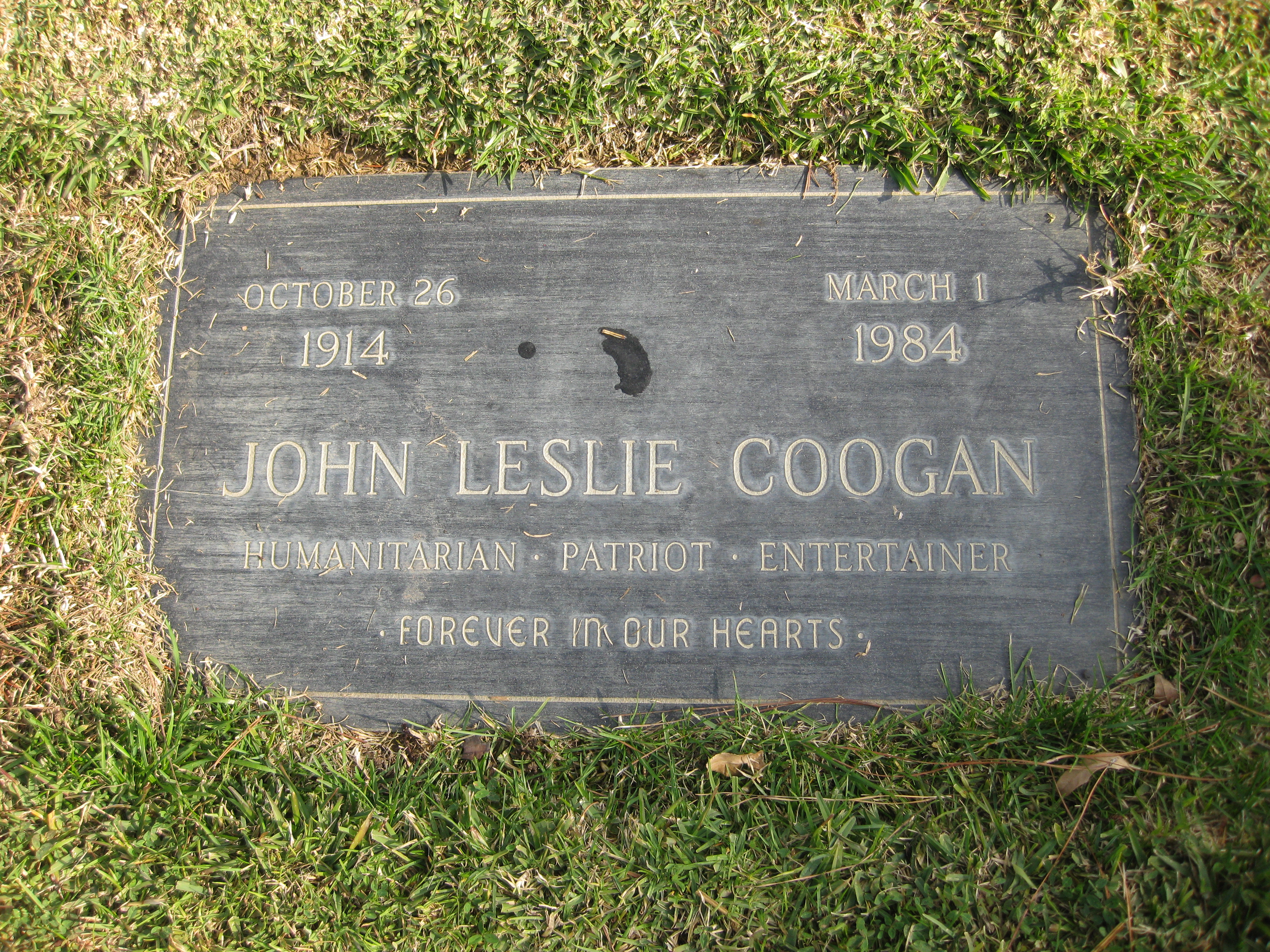
Grave at Holy Cross Cemetery in Culver City, California

After suffering from heart and kidney ailments, Coogan died of heart failure on March 1, 1984, at the age of 69, in Santa Monica, California. Coogan had a long history of heart trouble and hypertension and had previously suffered several strokes. He had been undergoing kidney dialysis when his blood pressure dropped. Coogan was taken to Santa Monica Hospital, where he died from cardiac arrest.

At Coogan's request, his funeral was open to the public and was attended by several fans. John Astin, Coogan's co-star from The Addams Family, delivered the eulogy. Coogan was interred at Holy Cross Cemetery in Culver City. His star on the Hollywood Walk of Fame is located at 1654 Vine Street, just south of Hollywood Boulevard.
