= Keith and Kevin Schultz =

American actors and photographers

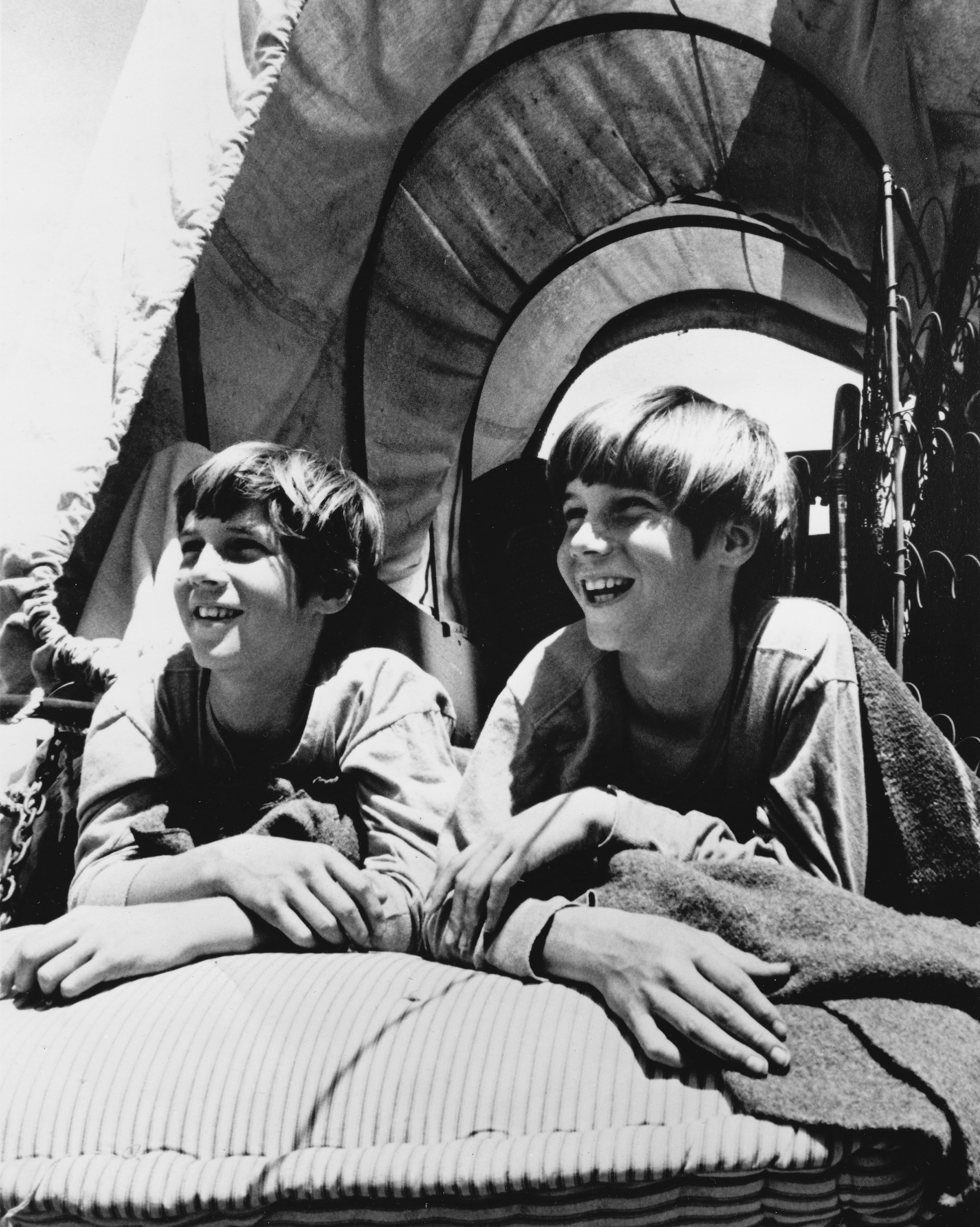
- Keith and Kevin Schultz in 1966
- Born: Keith Sean Schultz; Kevin Edward Schultz; September 16, 1953 (age 73); Santa Monica, California, U.S.
- Other name: The Schultz Brothers
- Occupations: Actors, singers, photographers
- Years active: 1955–1986 (actors); 1980s–present (photographers)
- Website: www.schultzbrosphoto.com

Keith and Kevin Schultz (born September 16, 1953) are American identical-twin photographers and former actors. Reportedly making their screen debut as infants, the Schultz brothers are perhaps best known for their roles as brothers Jefferson and Fennimore on the ABC Western frontier series The Monroes, as well as for Kevin's role as Tom Sawyer on the NBC live-action/animated series The New Adventures of Huckleberry Finn. After careers as child actors in front of the camera, the Schultz brothers transitioned to a career working together as professional photographers, best known for their celebrity "head shots" of notable Hollywood child stars.

== Early life ==
The Schultz brothers were born Keith Sean Schultz and Kevin Edward Schultz on September 16, 1953, in Santa Monica, California, to Earl and Evelyn Schultz. The brothers grew up in Hollywood with an older sister, Barbara (born c. 1948) and an older brother, Richard (born c. 1951). As infants, the brothers appeared in the feature film The Long Gray Line, sharing an uncredited role as the son of Kitty, played by Betsy Palmer. At age eight, they appeared on the Jan. 15, 1962, episode of the quiz show I've Got a Secret, their secret being that they had worked with panelist Palmer as infants. Throughout their childhood, the brothers continued to work as professional child actors, primarily playing twin roles in various commercials, films, and television series.

== Career ==
=== Acting ===
In 1966, Keith and Kevin landed starring roles on the television series The Monroes, portraying twin brothers Jefferson "Big Twin" Monroe and Fennimore "Little Twin" Monroe, respectively. The series, which also starred Michael Anderson, Jr., Barbara Hershey and Tammy Locke, centered around a frontier family of five orphan siblings as they attempted to make a new life in Jackson Hole, Wyoming. Although only lasting one season, the series launched the Schultz brothers as popular child stars of the day and the twins were routinely in demand to make celebrity appearances to meet with young fans across the United States during the height of the show's popularity.

After The Monroes, the Schultz brothers auditioned for the Hanna-Barbera television series The New Adventures of Huckleberry Finn, loosely based on the characters from the Mark Twain novel. Eventually beating out his brother for the role, Kevin co-starred as Tom Sawyer alongside Michael Shea as Huck Finn and LuAnn Haslam as Becky Thatcher, navigating weekly adventures within an animated world as they attempted to outrun a vengeful "Injun Joe", played by Ted Cassidy. All less than a year apart in age, the show's three teenaged stars were tutored together for three hours a day on the set between scenes, with each episode reportedly taking about four hours to film and six months to animate.

Premiering on NBC on September 16, 1968, The New Adventures of Huckleberry Finn aired in over 15 countries, and was the first weekly television series to combine live-action performers with animation. In a departure from the network's usual Saturday morning cartoon schedule, the series aired Sunday nights, and made its three young stars popular teen idols of the era. Although another series that lasted only one season, the show continued to air in reruns as part of The Banana Splits syndication package, becoming well known to subsequent generations for the next four decades.

In addition to The Monroes and The New Adventures of Huckleberry Finn, the Schultz brothers continued to appear in various other film and television roles, with Keith guest-starring on such television series as Gunsmoke, The Flying Nun, and Cannon, and Kevin guest-starring on such television series as The Iron Horse, Lucas Tanner, and Eight is Enough, as well as appearing in the feature film Big Wednesday. Keith and Kevin's final appearances would be together as brothers Ken and K.C. Zeigler on the Showtime comedy series Brothers in the episode titled "Two-Timin' Man", which aired August 6, 1986.

=== Music ===
In 1967, following the notoriety they had achieved on The Monroes, the Schultz brothers embarked on a music career, forming their own four-piece musical group "The Monroe Doctrine" with Greg Reinhardt and their elder brother Ric Schultz. Keith played rhythm guitar and Kevin played bass, while both sang harmony to Ric's lead vocals. By 1970, the group was known as "Keith, Kevin & Air" and featured the twins performing songs written by their brother Ric, as well as other group members, Brad Driver, Keith Fogel, Tim Henderson, and Jim Purvis. In 1970, Keith, Kevin & Air signed a record deal with Pzazz Records and released a seven-inch single that included the songs "Euphoria" and "Michael's Theme".

=== Photography ===
Following their show-business careers in front of the camera, the Schultz brothers transitioned to a joint career behind the camera as photographers of celebrities. According to their website SchultzBrosPhoto.com, the brothers had developed a passion for photography while working as child actors in Hollywood. Keith is the photographer of the team, while Kevin handles the lighting, retouching, and restoration elements. After 30 years of experience, the brothers are perhaps best known for their celebrity "head shots" of such child stars as Jonathan Taylor Thomas, Raven-Symoné, and Mary-Kate and Ashley Olsen, among others.

== Personal life ==
As teenagers, the Schultz twins garnered a significant amount of attention from the teen magazines of the late-1960s, and were said to have shared many of the same interests and ambitions. At the time, the brothers' interests reportedly included swimming, fishing, baseball, and football, as well as watching their favorite television show, The Avengers and listening to records by their favorite singing group, The Byrds.

== Filmography ==
Keith Schultz
Year	Work	Role	Notes
1955	The Long Gray Line	Kitty's Infant Son	Feature Film
1962	I've Got a Secret	Himself	January 15, 1962
1966–1967	The Monroes	Jefferson Monroe	Starring
1967	Gunsmoke	Timothy	"Baker's Dozen"
1968	The Flying Nun	Student	"May the Wind Be Always at Your Back"
1969	It's Happening	Himself / Judge	2 episodes
1973	Cannon	(Unknown)	"Come Watch Me Die"
1986	Brothers	Ken Zeigler	"Two-Timin' Man"
Kevin Schultz
Year	Work	Role	Notes
1955	The Long Gray Line	Kitty's Infant Son	Feature Film
1962	I've Got a Secret	Himself	January 15, 1962
1966–1967	The Monroes	Fennimore Monroe	Starring
1967	The Iron Horse	George	"Consignment, Betsy the Boiler"
1968–1969	The New Adventures of Huckleberry Finn	Tom Sawyer	Starring
1969	It's Happening	Himself / Judge	2 episodes
1975	Lucas Tanner	Kevin	"Why Not a Happy Ending?"
1978	Big Wednesday	Surfer	Feature Film
1980	Eight is Enough	Steve	"And Baby Makes Nine" - Parts 1 & 2
1986	Brothers	K.C. Zeigler	"Two-Timin' Man"
