= LuAnn Haslam =

American actress

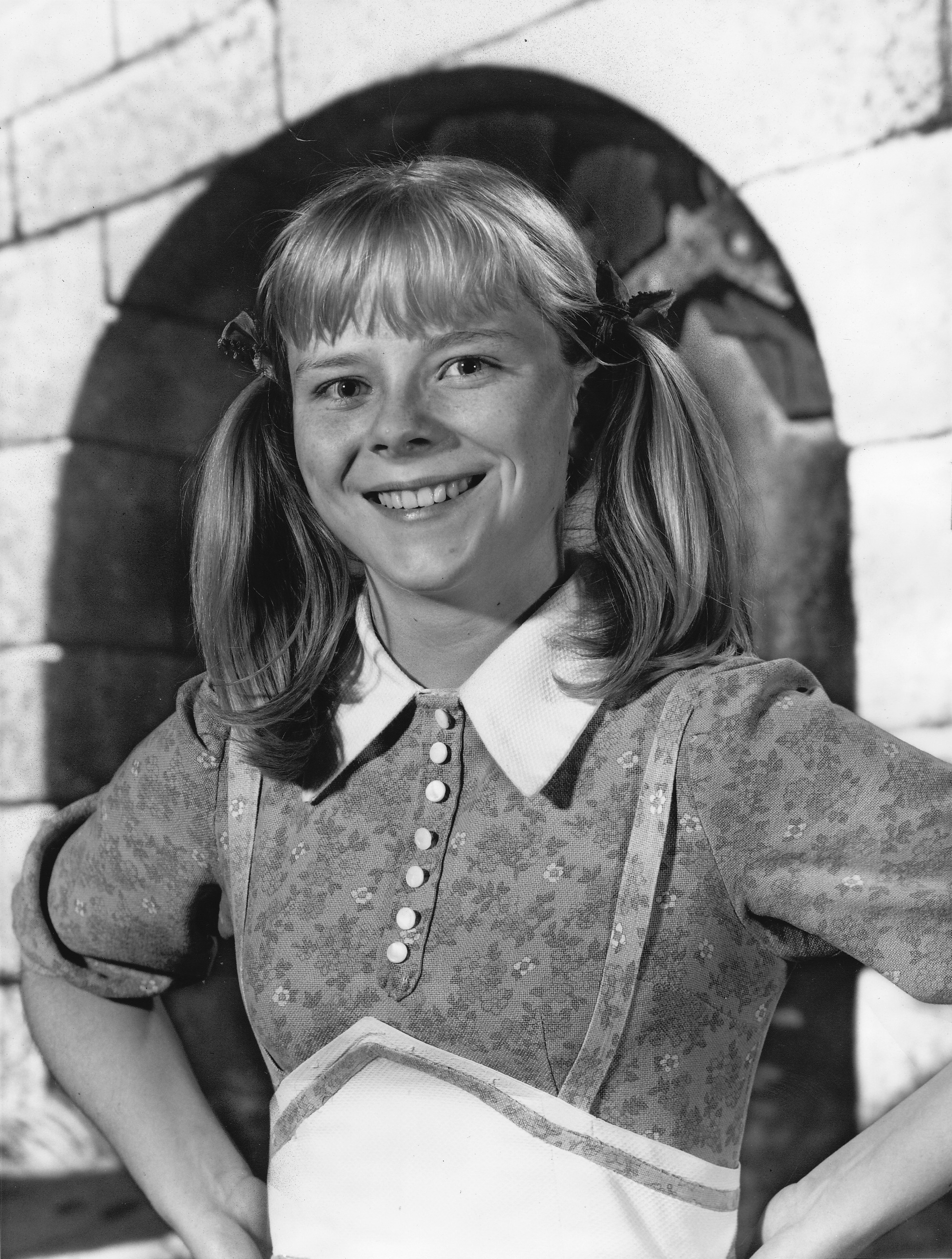
- LuAnn Haslam as Becky Thatcher, 1968.
- Born: March 28, 1953 (age 73); Pasadena, California, U.S.
- Other name: Patty the Prom Pro
- Occupations: Actress, blogger
- Years active: 1964–1969 (actress); 1996–present (blogger)

LuAnn Haslam (born March 28, 1953) is an American blogger and former child actress. Beginning a career as a professional child model and actress at the age of eleven, Haslam is best known for her role as "Becky Thatcher" on the Hanna-Barbera children's television series, The New Adventures of Huckleberry Finn which originally aired on NBC from 1968 to 1969. After leaving acting and becoming a high school teacher, Haslam assumed the identity of prom expert "Patty the Prom Pro", offering advice and services to high school students on the website Prom-Night.com

== Early life ==
Haslam was born on March 28, 1953, in Pasadena, California. She began working as a child model at the age of four, appearing in local fashion shows at Chaffey College and J.C.Penney's. Haslam's parents believed it was important to expose the Haslam children to the performing arts at a young age and she was soon cultivating her acting, singing and dancing abilities, performing in community theatre after school and on the weekends.

== Career ==
=== Acting ===
When Haslam was 11 years old, talent agent Pat Domigan discovered her in her father's store where she overheard Haslam telling a friend about a local play she was appearing in. Domigan approached Haslam's mother offering to represent her and she was soon going on professional auditions. In the subsequent years, Haslam worked as a child actress and model, appearing in print advertorials and television commercials for Diet-Rite Cola, Mattel Toys, and Downy Fabric Softener among others, before landing the role that would make her a star.

After several years as a working actress in commercials, Haslam landed the role of Becky Thatcher on the Hanna-Barbera television series The New Adventures of Huckleberry Finn, loosely based on the characters from the Mark Twain novel. Fourteen years old when she landed the role, Haslam co-starred alongside Michael Shea as Huck Finn and Kevin Schultz as Tom Sawyer, navigating weekly adventures within an animated world as they attempted to outrun a vengeful "Injun Joe", played by Ted Cassidy.

Premiering on NBC on September 16, 1968, Huckleberry Finn was the first weekly television series to combine live-action performers with animation. In its review of the series, The Newburgh Evening News praised the show for its innovative concept writing, "(T)he combined animation–live action techniques are excellent" and singled-out Haslam as "a charming scene stealer." All less than a year apart in age, the show's three teenage stars were tutored together for three hours a day on the set between scenes, with each episode reportedly taking approximately four hours to film and six months to animate.

In a departure from the network's usual Saturday morning cartoon schedule, Huckleberry Finn aired Sunday nights and made its three young stars popular teen idols of the era. The series aired in over 15 countries and its three young leads were routinely in demand to make celebrity appearances to meet with fans across the United States during the show's original run. Although the series lasted only one season, it continued to air in reruns as part of The Banana Splits syndication package, becoming well known to subsequent generations for the next four decades.

=== After acting ===
After Huck Finn ended, Haslam continued to appear in commercials, as well as some local theatrical productions, but eventually became less interested in pursuing a professional acting career. After graduating high school, Haslam attended Brigham Young University, eventually graduating with a teaching degree. As of 2004, Haslam was reportedly married and working as a teacher at San Gabriel High School where she taught math as well as film appreciation and film production classes.

As a high school teacher, one of Haslam's roles was serving as adviser of the Junior Class Council which organized the annual Junior and Senior proms at the school where she taught. This experience as high school "prom consultant" led to her alter-ego "Patty the Prom Pro". As Patty, Haslam's duties include answering questions on her blog at Prom-Night.com where she offers advice and services to high school age students preparing for their proms, as well as serving as the go-to prom "expert" to various news outlets such as E! Online and The Washington Times.

In addition to teaching high school and blogging as "Patty", Haslam also co-produces the annual "Xanadu Film Festival", which is held in the spring and honors student films with its "Snow Globe Trophy", a replica of the snow globe used in the film Citizen Kane. As of 2005, Haslam was reportedly still a dues-paying member of the Screen Actors Guild and was occasionally involved in behind-the-scenes work on feature films.
