= Michael Shea (actor) =

Actor

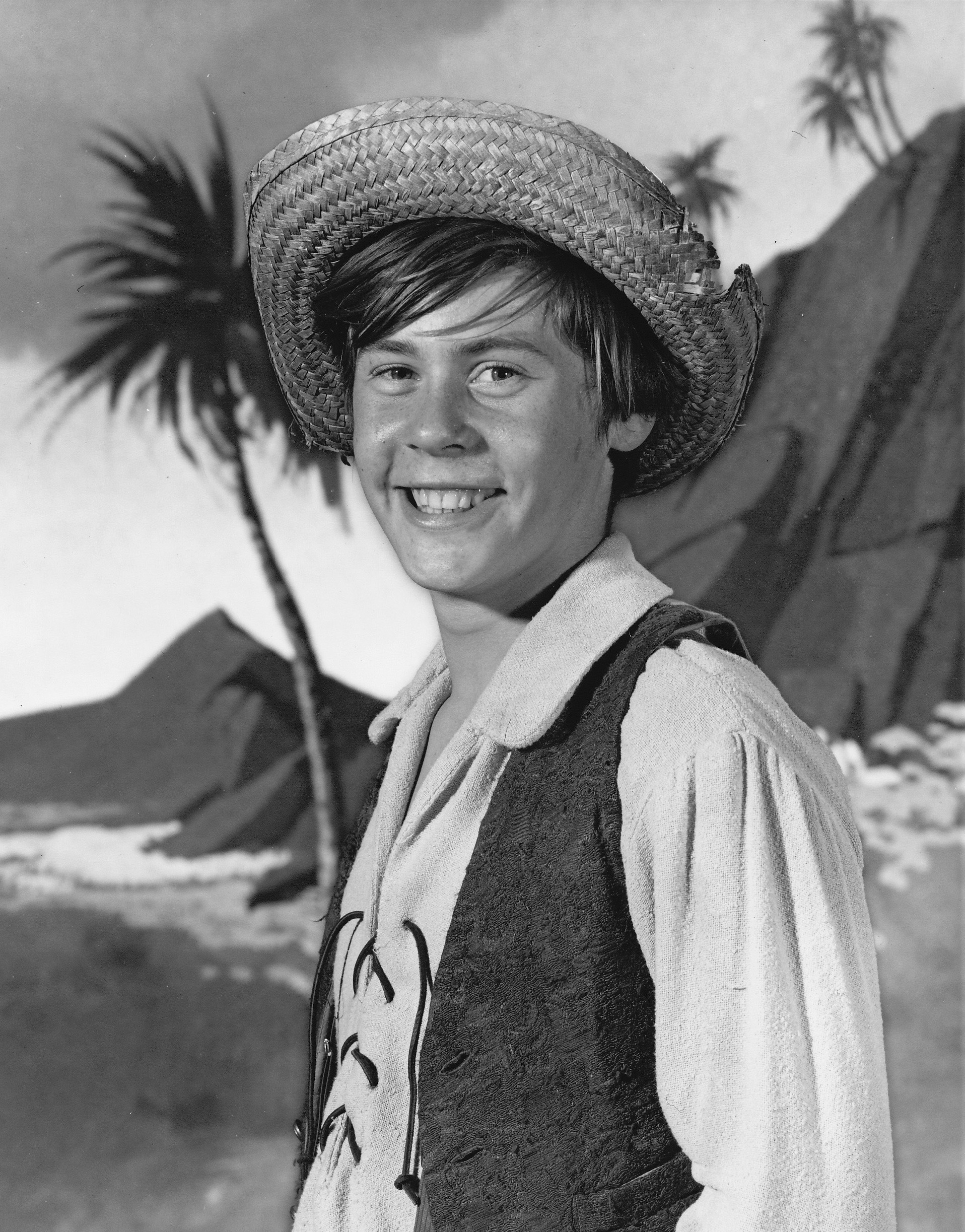
- Michael Shea as Huckleberry Finn, 1968.
- Born: Michael D. Shea; November 4, 1952 (age 73); Glendale, New York, USA
- Occupation: Actor
- Years active: 1963–1973

Michael Shea (born November 4, 1952) is an American former child actor. Beginning a prolific career at the age of ten, Shea is perhaps best known for portraying the title role in the NBC children's television series, The New Adventures of Huckleberry Finn, as well as for his feature film roles: as Nick in the Ivan Tors family film, Namu, the Killer Whale; as Jimmy in the MGM western, Welcome to Hard Times; and as "Cav" in the Walt Disney drama, Ride a Northbound Horse. Although born and raised in New York City, Shea was primarily cast as the wholesome small-town "country boy" throughout most of his career as a child star.

== Early life ==
Michael Shea was born on November 4, 1952 (some sources mistakenly reporting his year of birth as 1951) in Glendale, New York to parents Mr. and Mrs. Frank Shea. He spent his early years raised in New York and grew up with four siblings, two brothers and two sisters. When Shea was nine years old, a neighbor reportedly approached him with the idea of entering show business; however, the thought of stardom frightened him. In a 1968 interview, Shea recalled the early experience saying, "I ran into the woods and started crying. I kept saying, 'I don't want to be a star.'"

== Career ==
=== Early career ===
At the age of ten, Shea reconsidered the possibilities of a professional acting career. In 1968, he recounted his reasoning saying, "I thought I'd like to try acting, but I wasn't sure I'd want to stay in it, so I asked my neighbor if I could get out if I didn't like it. He said 'sure.'" Shea's neighbor was Liam Dunn, casting director of The Ed Sullivan Show, who used his industry connections to introduce Shea to a New York talent agent. Soon, Shea was landing work as a child model and actor, appearing in television commercials for Campbell's Soup and Scooter Pies among others.

After learning the show business ropes as a working actor in commercials, Shea made his theatrical debut, appearing in two "experimental" off-Broadway productions by Edward Albee, and made his television debut in The Bell Telephone Hour Christmas special. In 1965, Shea was signed to play the title role in a proposed western television series titled Joshua, which prompted the Shea family to relocate from its New York home to California. However the series never made it to television.

=== Breakthrough ===
After Shea was released from his obligations for Joshua, the family remained in California where he was soon landing guest-starring roles on such popular television shows of the time as Blue Light, Camp Runamuck, and The Fugitive. In 1966, Shea made his feature film debut in the Ivan Tors family drama Namu, the Killer Whale appearing as Nick, one of the antagonists to a family caring for a killer whale, inciting fear and hostility within their small seaside community.

After Namu, Shea returned to television roles, guest-starring on episodes of Mission: Impossible, Bewitched and The Virginian. In 1967, Shea landed a co-starring role in the western film Welcome to Hard Times as Jimmy, an orphan boy who is taken in by Will Blue (Henry Fonda) after his father is murdered by a vicious stranger terrorizing their small town. In the months that followed, Shea continued to appear on television, guest-starring on episodes of The Wild Wild West and The Danny Thomas Hour, before taking the role that would make him a star.

=== Huck Finn ===
In 1968, Shea landed the lead role in the Hanna-Barbera television series The New Adventures of Huckleberry Finn, loosely based on the characters from the Mark Twain novel. Reportedly beating out over 1,300 other boys for the role, Shea starred as the titular "Huck Finn" alongside LuAnn Haslam as Becky Thatcher and Kevin Schultz as Tom Sawyer, navigating weekly adventures within an animated world as they attempted to outrun a vengeful "Injun Joe", played by Ted Cassidy.

Premiering on NBC on September 16, 1968, the program was the first weekly television series to combine live-action performers with animation. In her review of the series, television critic Kathy Brooks described Shea's boy-next-door appeal, writing, "a more freshly-scrubbed looking Huck would be hard to find." All less than a year apart in age, the show's three teenage stars were tutored together for three hours a day on the set between scenes, with each episode reportedly taking approximately four hours to film and six months to animate.

In a departure from the network's usual Saturday morning cartoon schedule, the series aired Sunday nights and made its three young stars popular teen idols of the era. The series aired in over 15 countries and its three young leads were routinely in demand to make celebrity appearances to meet with fans across the United States during the show's original run. Although the series lasted only one season, it continued to air in reruns as part of The Banana Splits syndication package, becoming well known to subsequent generations for the next four decades.

=== Later career ===
After Huck Finn ended in 1969, Shea appeared in the Walt Disney's Wonderful World of Color film Ride a Northbound Horse. Premiering on March 16, 1969, the special presentation starred Shea as "Cav Rand", a 15-year-old orphan in the old west who buys a prize race horse, only to have it stolen by a con-artist played by Carroll O'Connor. Although airing in two-parts over a period of two Sundays in the United States, the story was presented in European markets as a stand-alone film.

In 1970, Shea made two appearances on the television series Headmaster and in 1971, began a recurring role as Dick Van Dyke's son Lucas Preston for two seasons on The New Dick Van Dyke Show. During this time, Shea also continued to guest-star on other popular series of the time, appearing on two episodes of the high school drama series Room 222, as well as appearing in two episodes of the religious anthology series Insight, the second of which would be his final television appearance in the July 1973 episode entitled "Celebration in Fresh Powder".

== Personal life ==
After Huck Finn ended, Shea attended classes at Van Nuys High School in the San Fernando Valley where he lived with his family. Shea graduated from Van Nuys High School in 1971 and, after leaving show business in 1973, began working in a patio furniture shop in Studio City, Los Angeles. In 1979, Shea became a police officer with the Los Angeles Police Department.

In 1993, the Los Angeles Times reported that one of Shea's duties with the LAPD included serving as the head of security for celebrities riding in the Hollywood Christmas Parade, exactly 25 years after he'd ridden in the same parade himself as the celebrity guest of honor during the height of his Huck Finn fame. In the same article, the L.A. Times also reported that Shea was married and resided in Castaic, California with his wife and children.

In September 2010, the Hollywood Chamber of Commerce posted a video on its official YouTube channel of Shea at the 7th Annual Hollywood PAL Benefit where he had been honored for his "incredible dedication and hard work" and "community involvement" as a law enforcement officer. At the ceremony, it was announced that Shea had recently retired from his 31-year career with the LAPD as a Senior Lead Officer.

Michael is the father of Mike Shea, Paralympic Snowboarder & winner of the silver medal in snowboard-cross at the 2014 Sochi Paralympic Winter Games.

== Filmography ==
Film
Year	Film	Role	Notes
1966	Namu, the Killer Whale	Nick	—
1967	Welcome to Hard Times	Jimmy Fee	—
1969	Ride a Northbound Horse	Cav Rand	European release
Television
Year	Film	Role	Notes
1964	The Bell Telephone Hour	Himself	Christmas Special
1965	The Defenders	(Unknown)	(Unknown episode)
1966	Blue Light	Klaus	"How to Kill a Soldier"
1966	Camp Runamuck	Hefflefinger	"Commander for a Day"
1966	The Fugitive	Rick	"In a Plain Paper Wrapper"
1966	Mission: Impossible	Pieter Stakovar	"A Spool There Was"
1966	Bewitched	Johnny Mills	"Soapbox Derby"
1967	The Virginian	Jamie Adams	"Bitter Harvest"
1967	The Wild Wild West	Boy	"The Night of the Falcon"
1968	The Danny Thomas Hour	David Rubin	"The Last Hunters"
1968–1969	The New Adventures of Huckleberry Finn	Huck Finn	Starring
1969	Walt Disney's Wonderful World of Color	Cav Rand	"Ride a Northbound Horse" - Parts 1 & 2
1969	Me and Benjy	Teenage Boyfriend	Possibly unaired episodes
1970	Headmaster	Fred / Wayne	2 episodes
1972	Room 222	Scott	2 episodes
1971–1973	The New Dick Van Dyke Show	Lucas Preston	Recurring
1971–1973	Insight	Jack	2 episodes
