= The New Adventures of Huckleberry Finn =

Television series

- Title card
- Also known as: The New Adventures of Huck Finn
- Genre: Fantasy
- Based on: Adventures of Huckleberry Finn created by Mark Twain
- Starring: Michael Shea; LuAnn Haslam; Kevin Schultz; Ted Cassidy
- Theme music composer: Ted Nichols
- Opening theme: "The New Adventures of Huckleberry Finn"
- Ending theme: "The New Adventures of Huckleberry Finn"
- Composer: Ted Nichols
- Country of origin: United States
- Original language: English
- No. of episodes: 20 (list of episodes)

Production
- Executive producers: Joseph Barbera; William Hanna
- Producer: Edward Rosen
- Cinematography: Kenneth Peach
- Editors: Edward Warschilka; Donald A. Douglas
- Camera setup: Single-camera
- Running time: 30 minutes
- Production company: Hanna-Barbera Productions

Original release
- Network: NBC
- Release: September 15, 1968 – February 23, 1969

The New Adventures of Huckleberry Finn is an American live-action and animated fantasy television series that originally aired on NBC from September 15, 1968, through February 23, 1969. Produced by Hanna-Barbera and based on the classic Mark Twain characters, the program starred its three live-action heroes, Huck Finn (Michael Shea), Becky Thatcher (LuAnn Haslam), and Tom Sawyer (Kevin Schultz), navigating weekly adventures within an animated world as they attempted to outrun a vengeful Injun Joe (voiced by Ted Cassidy). After the show's original run, the series continued to air in reruns as part of The Banana Splits and Friends Show syndication package.

== Production ==
In February 1967, Hanna-Barbera Productions announced it was in the process of developing a record number of six new animated television series. According to the Los Angeles Times, the six new series in various stages of production at the time were Moby Dick and Mighty Mightor, Zartan (a.k.a. The Herculoids), Shazzan, Samson & Goliath, The Fantastic Four and The New Adventures of Huckleberry Finn. Also nearing the end of post-production at the time was Hanna-Barbera's Jack and the Beanstalk, an hour-long special which featured Gene Kelly dancing alongside various cartoon characters and aired on February 26, 1967. In a 2005 interview, LuAnn Haslam stated that Jack and the Beanstalk had served as a "trial run" for the technology of combining live-action with animation, saying, "NBC had to be convinced that combining people with cartoon figures would work. It was a big success and so NBC went forward with our series."

At the time of production, The New Adventures of Huckleberry Finn was the first weekly television series to combine live-action performers and animation. During development of the series, William Hanna and Joseph Barbera also stated the show was to be the most expensive half hour ever put on television. In a July 1967 interview with columnist Hal Humphrey, William Hanna expressed high hopes for the innovative new concept, saying "When you say the word 'cartoon', people think of children only, and we limit ourselves – although plenty of adults watch cartoons. We think combining the live action with the animation will give our company a special identification," with Joseph Barbera adding, "And do you know the clothes from that period are 'mod' today? The kids are wearing the same high-gaiter shoes now that Huck and Tom wore then."

After NBC green-lit the series, preparations began to find the youngsters to portray the series' three leads. In 2005, Haslam recalled the casting process, saying "(T)he show was produced by both Hanna-Barbera and NBC. As a result there were a lot of people to make happy when it came to choosing the cast. As I understand it, Hanna-Barbera cast the show and sent some kind of screen test/pilot to the NBC executives in New York. NBC didn't like the choices that had been made. They decided that they wanted the cast to be younger. So Hanna-Barbera had to start all over again." In casting their lead, Hanna-Barbera and NBC eventually found their ideal "Huck" in 14-year-old veteran child actor Michael Shea, reportedly selecting him out of 1,300 boys. Fourteen-year-old newcomer LuAnn Haslam was chosen to play "Becky". In recounting how she landed the role, Haslam stated, "I got a call from my agent to go to Hanna-Barbera for an interview. Carmen Sanchez was the casting director. As I walked into her office she was on the telephone. She turned, looked at me and said to the person on the telephone, 'I have to go, Becky just walked in.'"

Rounding out the series live-action cast was 13-year-old Kevin Schultz who was cast as "Tom". At the time, Schultz was best known for starring on the television western series The Monroes alongside his twin brother Keith, who had reportedly also auditioned for the role of "Tom" before Kevin was selected.

Character actor Ted Cassidy was cast to voice the role of the animated antagonist "Injun Joe". In an August 1967 interview with columnist Mel Heimer, Cassidy stated that he was looking forward to his upcoming role on the new series, saying, "I think I'll get more of a chance to do some acting than I did in (The Addams Family)."

With the series' three young live-action stars in place, the complicated filming process began. During the months the series was in production, each day of filming reportedly began at 9:00 a.m. Under California law at the time, child actors were required to attend school for three hours a day and periods of instruction had to last at least 20 minutes at a time. When asked about the filming process, Michael Shea described an average day on the set, saying, "First we'd get made-up and dressed, and then we'd go to school while the shot was being set up. By coincidence, we were all taking the exact same subjects, so we were tutored together."

The live actors' scenes were filmed in front of a royal blue backdrop (an early forerunner to the modern-day CGI green screen) and the cartoon background and characters were animated in later. Working with a technology still in its infancy, the young cast was required to master the art of engaging in conversational exchanges without having their animated co-stars to interact with. Shea recalled, "Injun Joe, for instance, was a cartoon character, so when I had to talk to him, I'd run my eyes slowly up the blue screen until the director told me to stop. Then I'd just try to remember where that point on the screen was." Since the voice actors would not record their audio tracks until after principal filming was completed, character actor Bruce Watson, whom Shea described as "the greatest dialogue coach in the world", would perform the lines of all the animated characters during filming for the live-action stars to interact with. (Note: Haslam mistakenly gives Watson's name as "Bruce Davidson".) Each episode reportedly took approximately 4 hours to film and six months to animate.

== Premise ==
The pilot episode opens with a live-action prologue which sets the premise for the series. It is late afternoon in Hannibal, Missouri, and Twain's classic characters, Aunt Polly (Tom's aunt) and Mrs. Thatcher (Becky's mother) appear distressed in their concern for the youngsters, who are said to be late arriving home. Next, we see our three protagonists, Huckleberry Finn (Michael Shea), Becky Thatcher (LuAnn Haslam) and Tom Sawyer (Kevin Schultz) taking a shortcut home through the town's graveyard, where they encounter "Injun Joe" (Ted Cassidy). Furious at the two boys for testifying in court about witnessing him murder Doctor Robinson, Injun Joe chases the three children into McDougal's Cave. As the spry children outrun him, an angry Injun Joe vows revenge, calling out to them "You'll never get away from me! I'll find you, no matter where you go!" Once inside, however, the three youngsters find themselves hopelessly lost in the cave's labyrinthine passageways. This prologue would be re-edited with a voice-over by Michael Shea as Huck Finn summarizing the events, and would serve as the opening sequence for each subsequent episode.

Although we never see the three youngsters emerge from the cave, it is presumed that they eventually find a way out since, as each episode proper begins, we join our three young live-action heroes as they now inhabit an animated world. Throughout the series, the children embark on a quest to return to their families in Hannibal, Missouri, traveling to various exotic animated lands (tropical islands; Egyptian deserts; Aztec cities; etc.) and make friends with—or run afoul of—an array of fanciful animated characters (leprechauns; pirates; sorcerers; etc.). Every episode also features an evil animated antagonist who bears an uncanny resemblance to Injun Joe (voiced by Cassidy). The likeness is not lost on the three children, who are routinely startled by the striking similarity to their nemesis back home; however, no explanation is offered of how, or why, Injun Joe is constantly able to remain one step ahead of them and assume these various guises. As the series only lasted one season, an episode explaining how, or if, the three children ever make it back home, or if it may, in fact, all be some sort of surrealistic "dream", is never seen.

== Cast ==
Starring

- Michael Shea as Huckleberry Finn
- LuAnn Haslam as Becky Thatcher
- Kevin Schultz as Tom Sawyer
- Ted Cassidy as Injun Joe
- Dorothy Tennant as Mrs. Thatcher
- Anne Bellamy as Aunt Polly

== Reception ==
In a departure from the networks' traditional cartoon time-slots, which were most commonly afternoons after school or Saturday mornings, the series premiered in its 7:00 p.m. Sunday night time-slot (or 6:00 p.m. depending on the time zone) on September 15, 1968. Initial reaction was generally positive, with critics praising Hanna-Barbera's technique of combining live-action with animation as well as the performances of the show's three young leads. While acknowledging the series bore little resemblance to the original Twain stories, Milwaukee Journal critic Wade Mosby felt the series would be enjoyable for its target audience, describing the series' three young leads as "engaging" and continuing, "There's lots of activity, some thrills and chuckles and (aside from the introduction) not too much violence."

The Newburgh Evening News also expected the show to be popular with children, writing, "The younger set will love this show." and continuing the following week, "(T)he combined animation–live action techniques are excellent", as well as singling out young Haslam as "a charming scene stealer." However, Telegram News Service critic Kathy Brooks expressed disappointment in Hanna-Barbera's handling of the beloved Twain characters writing, "Shame on Hanna-Barbera. They've taken the characters, and in reverse Twain tradition, white-washed them into fine upstanding citizens with no deviltry, and no charming original thoughts. Michael Shea plays Huck, and a more freshly-scrubbed looking Huck would be hard to find; Kevin Schultz plays Tom, and ditto for him. [...] No parent worth his salt should let his offspring think the TV version is the real Twain, or the real Becky or Tom or Huck."

As a Sunday evening show, the series garnered a wider audience than Saturday morning cartoons of the time, and launched its three attractive young stars as popular teen idols of the day. The series aired in over 15 countries and its three young leads were routinely in demand to make celebrity appearances to meet with young fans across the United States during the show's original run. During this time, the series also inspired a comic book adaptation. In December 1968, Gold Key Comics published a one-issue The New Adventures Of Huck Finn comic book, based on the episode "The Curse Of Thut" which aired around the same time. Although popular with child and teenage audiences, the series struggled in the ratings against its Sunday night competition (Land of the Giants on ABC and Lassie on CBS), by the end of 1968, news sources were already reporting that a second season appeared unlikely.

The final original episode aired on February 23, 1969, with NBC continuing to air the show in reruns through the fall of that year, ultimately replacing it with Wild Kingdom on September 14, 1969. After the show's cancellation, the series was repackaged into syndication as part of The Banana Splits and Friends Show. Although originally airing in an hour-long format as a Saturday morning show called The Banana Splits Adventure Hour, subsequent incarnations were re-edited and sold into syndication as half-hour episodes which included several series not originally part of the original show. As part of The Banana Splits, The New Adventures of Huckleberry Finn enjoyed new life, becoming well known to subsequent generations for the next four decades.

== List of episodes ==
No.	Title	Directed by	Written by	Original release date	Prod. code
1	"The Magic Shillelah"	Hollingsworth Morse	Frank Crow and Leo Rifkin	September 15, 1968	30-14
Leprechauns seek their lost magic shillelah, which Becky finds first. Tom and Huck are taken prisoner by the gypsy chieftain, Zarko, who eventually gets hold of the magic shillelah. Becky and the leprechauns come to the rescue and recover the shillelah. Voices: Dennis Day, Daws Butler, Henry Corden, Don Messick, John Myhers
2	"Huck of La Mancha"	Hollingsworth Morse	George Eckstein	September 22, 1968	30-9
Tom, Huck and Becky meet Don Quixote de la Mancha. Together they head off to rescue Quixote's squire, Sancho Panza, and challenge the brigand leader Don Jose. Instead Don Jose captures Tom and Quixote, who make their escape and overthrow Don Jose and his men.
3	"The Terrible Tempered Kahleef"	Bruce Bilson	Joanna Lee	September 29, 1968	30-7
In the city of Baghistan ruled by the tyrannical, woman-snatching Kahleef, Becky gets captured, so Tom and Huck stow away on a ship and sneak into the palace. The retired sorcerer Muzaffar helps provide Tom and Huck a way to stealthily rescue Becky.
4	"The Little People"	Walter S. Burr	Kenneth L. Kolb	October 6, 1968	30-3
Tom, Huck and Becky get shipwrecked and separated on an island. Huck meets the Lilliputians and is to be wed to King Bigun's daughter, Princess Tina. Tom and Becky rescue a hunter, Bitto, and his partner and head to the Lilliputians to help each other escape from a tribe of savages.
5	"Pirate Island"	Byron Haskin	Kenneth L. Kolb	October 13, 1968	30-4
Tom, Huck and Becky row to an island inhabited by apes. Pirates, led by Captain X, come to the island and capture Tom and Becky. Huck and an ape named Bulu help Tom and Becky to battle the pirates and they narrowly manage to escape the ship as it blows up.
6	"The Last Labor of Hercules"	Hollingsworth Morse	David Duncan	October 20, 1968	30-6
Tom, Huck and Becky are lost in the woods and meet Hercules, who has his final labor to complete. The king and his centaur servant try to make sure that he fails and imprison Tom, Huck and Becky, but they escape and, with the aid of Pegasus, prevent Hercules from falling into the king's trap and enable him to complete the last labor.
7	"The Gorgon's Head"	Hollingsworth Morse	Herman Miller	October 27, 1968	30-16
In a cave, Tom, Huck and Becky free a maiden who was to be a human sacrifice and for that the Guru imprisons them, but the Guru's servant releases them. Together, the three head off to get the Gorgon's head in order to defeat the fire hydra and rescue the maiden, which culminates in the Guru being turned to stone.
8	"The Castle of Evil"	Walter S. Burr	Kenneth L. Kolb	November 3, 1968	30-5
In a dark forest, Becky is caught by the skeleton warriors of the wizard Zilbad. Tom and Huck infiltrate the castle and break into Zilbad's laboratory to rescue Becky, where Huck tricks Zilbad into turning himself into a crystal statue, which undoes his evil curses.
9	"Hunting the Hunter"	Hollingsworth Morse	Kenneth L. Kolb	November 24, 1968	30-11
While trying to find food, Tom, Huck and Becky are surrounded by animals who do not like humans. After a judgement trial, a hunter arrives. Becky aids an injured fox, while Tom and Huck distract the hunter, which enables the animals to ambush him.
10	"The Curse of Thut"	Bruce Bilson	David Duncan	December 1, 1968	30-2
Lost in the desert, Tom, Huck and Becky are met by Thut, who seeks his lost love Marna, and are taken to the Typhonian Pharaoh for a deadly trial, but they manage to summon Thut, who ends his 5,000 year search for Marna and shows the three the way out. Note: This story was adapted in issue #1 (10232-812, December 1968) of the Gold Key comic The New Adventures of Huck Finn.
11	"The Ancient Valley"	Hollingsworth Morse	David Duncan	December 15, 1968	30-13
Tom, Huck and Becky fly in a balloon to a prehistoric valley. A spear-throwing tribe are at war with a rock-throwing tribe. Becky tries to stop this useless war, but the three are captured by a mountain tribe. They make their escape after disposing of the mountain tribe's chieftain.
12	"Menace in the Ice"	Walter S. Burr	Peter Allan Fields	December 22, 1968	30-10
Tom, Huck and Becky are abducted by Captain Calidor and put to work on his ship. Calidor is intent on melting the snowland glaciers. After some difficulty, Huck gets help from the Abominable Snowmen whilst the ship's servant, Huga, turns against Calidor and overthrows him.
13	"The Eye of Doorgah"	Robert Gist	Herman Miller	December 29, 1968	30-1
A gem called the Eye of Doorgah is stolen from a temple. Both Tom and Huck go off to find it and are caught at a Thuggee clan's lair, but they manage to escape, recover the gem and return it to the temple, where Doorgah banishes the Thuggee clan.
14	"Mission of Captain Mordecai"	Ezra Stone	Joanna Lee	January 5, 1969	30-8
Lost at sea, Tom, Huck and Becky board Captain Mordecai's ship. The captain's mission is to kill a monstrous whale. As the three are swallowed by the whale, the captain chases them around the whale's body until they escape through the whale's blowhole.
15	"The Jungle Adventure"	Hollingsworth Morse	Bill Lutz	January 19, 1969	30-15
In the jungle, Tom is poisoned by a Anatrata bush. Huck and Becky get caught on a slave-trading ship, while Tom is taken by tribal warriors. Huck and Becky escape with Chibunu and get back to the tribe in time to cure Tom.
16	"Son of the Sun"	Hollingsworth Morse	Al C. Ward and Kenneth L. Kolb	January 26, 1969	30-19
Tom splits with his friends and enters an Aztec city where he is made the Sun King, but his trial for true kingship is bound to fail. Huck and Becky save Tom and they all make their escape.
17	"Prophecy of Peril"	Hollingsworth Morse	David Duncan	February 2, 1969	30-17
Tom, Huck and Becky thwart a Mongol ambush on a Chinese prince. The Khan sends Tom to enter the city of Petua by means of a Trojan horse. Huck and Becky escape with the help of a dog, while Tom escapes Petua in a dragon kite and blows up the Mongol camp.
18	"Strange Experiment"	Hollingsworth Morse	Kenneth L. Kolb	February 9, 1969	30-12
Tom, Huck and Becky enter the house of a mad scientist, Dr. Filostro, who shrinks Huck. Tom and Becky escape their prison and get Huck to his normal size. In the chaos that follows, Filostro, his assistant Creech and a hideous monster all get shrunk.
19	"The Conquistador Curse"	Bruce Bilson	Tom and Helen August	February 16, 1969	30-18
In Ancient Incan ruins lies the armor of a cursed conquistador who haunts Tom, Huck and Becky for the gold they took away from him, which they lose as they progress onward. After they lose all the gold, they find themselves freed from the curse.
20	"All Whirlpools Lead to Atlantis"	Robert Gist	Robert Sabaroff and Leo Rifkin	February 23, 1969	30-20
Tom, Huck and Becky get sucked down a whirlpool to the ocean floor. King Llandor of Atlantis and Huck exchange clothes, so Morpho's minions mistake Huck for Llandor. Morpho next captures Tom and Becky, but all three make their escape and help Llandor defeat Morpho and his minions.

== Home media ==
On June 28, 2016, Warner Archive released The New Adventures of Huckleberry Finn: The Complete Series on DVD in Region 1 for the very first time. This is a Manufacture-on-Demand (MOD) release, available exclusively through Warner's online store and Amazon.com.

== See also ==
- The Adventures of Tom Sawyer
- Adventures of Huckleberry Finn
- The Banana Splits
