= Black Rage (film) =

1972 film by Chris Robinson

- Directed by: Chris Robinson
- Written by: Chris Robinson; Ted Cassidy (additional dialogue)
- Produced by: Chris Robinson
- Starring: Chris Robinson; Anthony Scott; Ted Cassidy; Robert Leslie; Phyllis Robinson; Chauncey Lord Westbrook; George De Vries; William Lampley; David Faris Legge; Robert Shields; John Wright
- Music by: Tommy Oliver
- Distributed by: First American Films
- Release date: 1972
- Running time: 102 minutes 91 minutes (1988 video release)
- Country: United States
- Language: English

Black Rage (also known as Catch the Black Sunshine (Australian video title) or Charcoal Black) is a 1972 American film, directed, produced, written by, and starring Chris Robinson.

== Plot ==
Two slave brothers, African-American Levi (Anthony Scott) and Albino Sunshine (Chris Robinson), discover a treasure map while digging on the plantation of their master, Striker (Ted Cassidy). Though Striker initially takes the map from them, they take it back and escape, determined to find the treasure in order to set themselves free. Striker pursues them, eventually stopping at a seedy bar to recruit helpers who will aid him in his pursuit; he recruits a mysterious bounty hunter, as well as the bartender (Robert Leslie). The two slaves follow the map continuously through the woods and swamps, regularly confronting and escaping various dangers from snakes to a group of rednecks. They briefly find refuge in an escaped slaves' camp, but Striker and his men follow the trail straight to the camp and run out the population. Striker is noticeably disturbed at the bartender for killing a woman and an old man, and briefly pulls his own gun on the man.

The brothers continue on further and briefly find refuge in the stilt house of a kind woman (Phyllis Robinson), before a storm the following night knocks over a lantern and starts a fire that burns the house down. They continue on into the forest, where they encounter a Native American, whom Levi strangles to death before they appropriate his canoe. The three of them use the canoe to follow the river to the open ocean before stopping at a port town. However, the next morning, they discover that the woman has abandoned them and several of their supplies have been stolen. Nevertheless, they continue towards the treasure, thinking that they are getting closer.

Striker, the bartender, and the bounty hunter finally catch up to Levi and Sunshine at a beach, where Striker has a change of heart and even betrays and stabs the bartender. However, the bounty hunter refuses to give up the hunt, and when Sunshine attempts to flee into the water with the map, the bounty hunter guns him down, with the map washing away in the current. Levi overpowers the bounty hunter and beats him to death with the butt of his own rifle before the reformed Striker stops him and comforts him, even helping him carry Sunshine's body to shore. The film ends with Striker and Levi watching the sunset over the ocean before the end credits roll.

== Cast ==
- Chris Robinson as Sunshine, an albino black man.
- Anthony Scott as Levi, Sunshine's non-albino brother.
- Ted Cassidy as Striker, Sunshine and Levi's slave owner.
- Robert Leslie as the bartender.
- Phyllis Robinson as the woman from the stilt house.

== See also ==
- List of American films of 1972
