= Namu, the Killer Whale =

1966 film by László Benedek

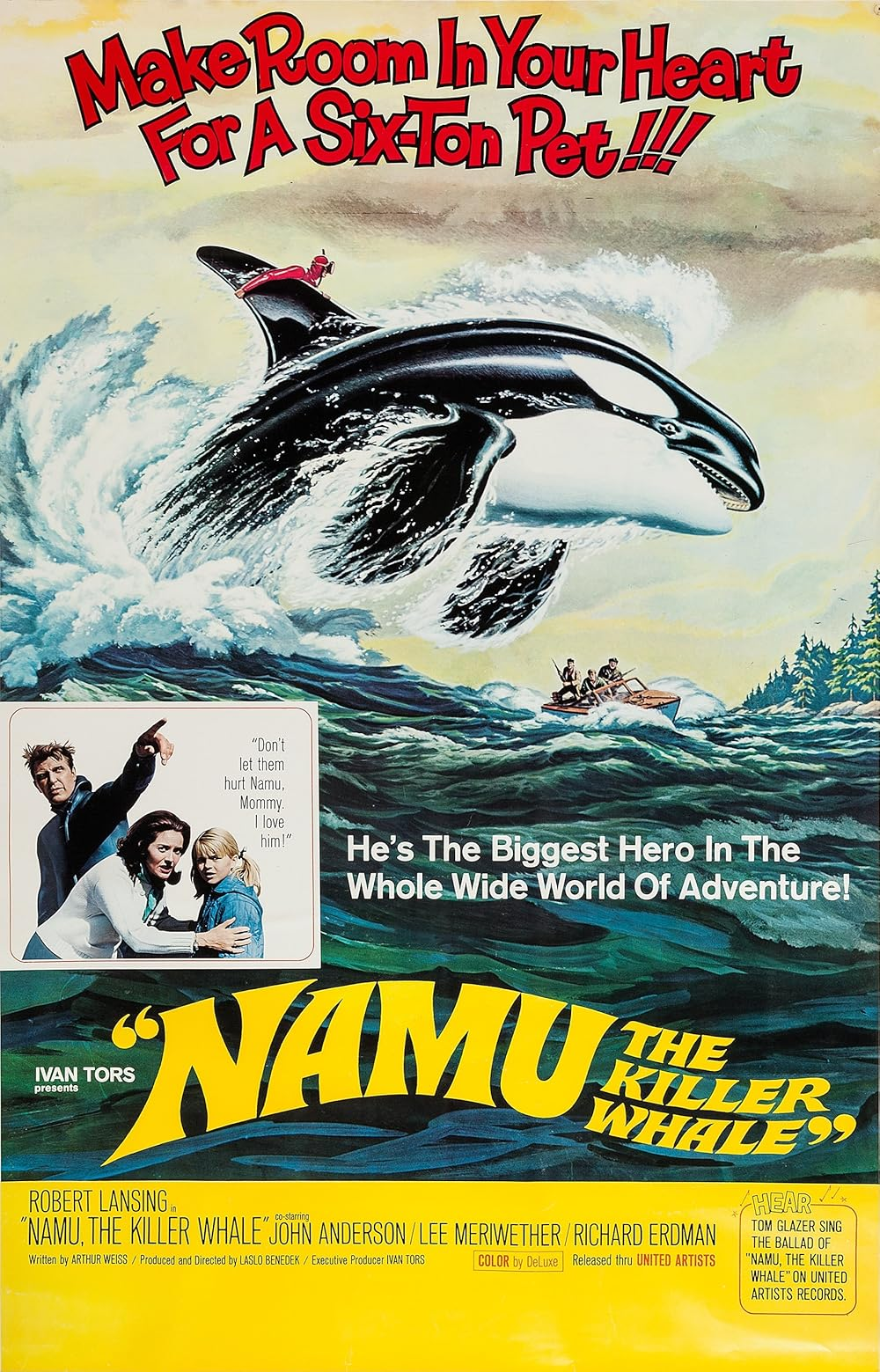
- Film poster
- Directed by: László Benedek
- Written by: Arthur Weiss
- Produced by: László Benedek, Lamar Boren, Ivan Tors
- Starring: Robert Lansing, Lee Meriwether, Robin Mattson, John Anderson, Richard Erdman, Joe Higgins, Michael Shea
- Cinematography: Lamar Boren
- Edited by: Erwin Dumbrille
- Music by: Samuel Matlovsky (original music), Thomas "Tom" Glazer (theme song)
- Production company: United Artists
- Distributed by: United Artists
- Release date: August 1966
- Running time: 89 minutes
- Country: United States
- Language: English

Namu, the Killer Whale (re-issued as Namu, My Best Friend) is a 1966 American film about a "killer whale" (orca) being studied by a local marine biologist after the murder of his mate and initially feared by local townspeople.

== Plot ==
Hank Donner is a marine biologist camping and studying the underwater fauna near a Northwest Pacific fishing town. One day, while Hank and his local assistant Deke study a pod of grey whales swimming past the cove where they have set up camp, they witness a pair of fishermen, Joe Clausen and Burt, shooting at a passing group of killer whales. A female is fatally wounded and drifts into the cove, where she beaches and dies. Her mate remains near the carcass, mourning; Clausen and Burt insist on killing him, but Hank manages to send them off.

Hank seals off the cove with a net barrier strung across the entrance and then sets down to study the orca, who is dubbed "Namu" in the film's song. They are watched with distrust by the locals, except Kate Rand, the owner of the fishing gear store where Hank purchases his supplies, and her young daughter Lisa, who admires Hank's work. As Hank continues his observations, occasionally visited by the curious Lisa, Namu eventually overcomes his grief and begins playfully interacting with Hank. In time, Lisa leads some of the local children to the cove, and they throw food to Namu. One of the boys, Nick, viciously stuffs a hooked float into a piece of fish, making Namu go wild with pain when he swallows it.

Following this incident, the townspeople march to the cove, fully armed, to kill Namu. Hank, however, soon discovers the cause for Namu's agony, and to prove that Namu is a peaceful creature, he dons swimming gear and enters the cove, followed by Kate when the fisherfolk still hesitate. The sight of the two swimming with Namu finally disperses their prejudice, but then Clausen, who has separated from the mob, opens fire from a boat beyond the net barrier. Hank has Deke open the net; Namu swims out and overturns Clausen's boat, but instead of killing him, he keeps Clausen afloat until Hank and Deke fish him out.

Once out in the open water, Namu encounters another group of orcas and joins them in swimming out into the sea.

== Cast ==
- Robert Lansing as Hank Donner
- John Anderson as Joe Clausen
- Robin Mattson as Lisa Rand
- Richard Erdman as Deke
- Lee Meriwether as Kate Rand
- Joe Higgins as Burt
- Michael Shea as Nick
- Clara Tarte as Carrie
- Edwin Rochelle as Charlie

== Production ==
The fictional story was filmed on location in the San Juan Islands and at Rich Cove near Port Orchard, Washington.

The film 'starred' the orca Namu, one of the first orcas ever displayed in captivity.

== Theme song ==
"The Ballad of Namu, the Killer Whale", written and performed by Tom Glazer.

== See also ==
- List of American films of 1966
- Orca (also known as Orca: The Killer Whale), a 1977 film about a male orca getting revenge on a fisherman who accidentally killed his pregnant mate and their unborn calf.
