= The Danny Thomas Hour =

U.S. television series

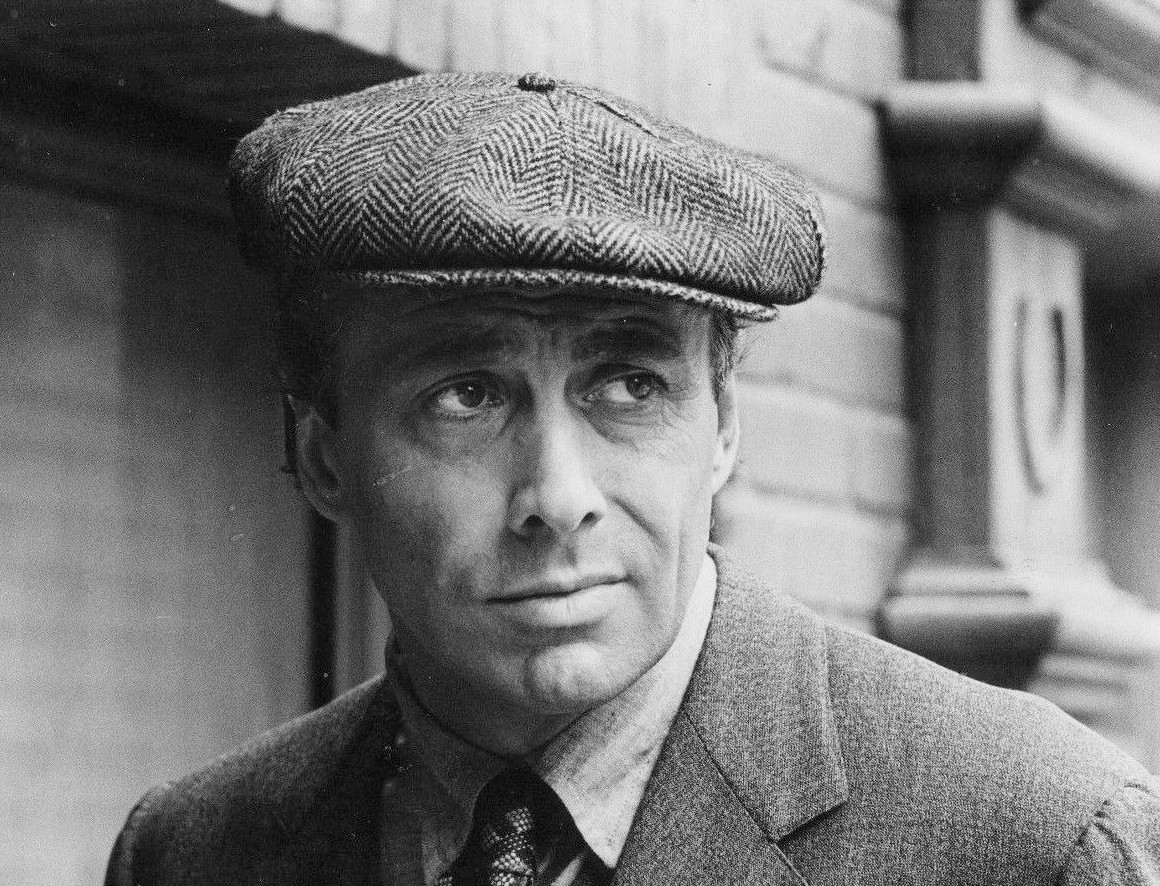
- Richard Kiley in "The Measure of a Man", 1968
- Genre: Anthology
- Directed by: Jack Arnold (director); Paul Bogart; Lamont Johnson; Sheldon Leonard; Boris Sagal; Peter Tewksbury; Danny Thomas
- Starring: Danny Thomas
- Country of origin: United States
- Original language: English
- No. of seasons: 1
- No. of episodes: 22

Production
- Executive producer: Danny Thomas
- Producer: Aaron Spelling
- Running time: 25 minutes
- Production companies: Thomas-Spelling Productions; CBS Television Distribution (syndication)

Original release
- Network: NBC
- Release: September 11, 1967 – June 3, 1968

The Danny Thomas Hour is an American anthology television series that was broadcast on NBC during the 1967–68 television season.

== Synopsis ==
The Danny Thomas Hour comprised various formats, including dramas, comedies and musical-variety hours, produced on videotape and film. Thomas hosted the dramas and the musical-variety hours, starring in the latter. One of the comedies was an hour-long sequel to his former situation comedy, The Danny Thomas Show (aka Make Room for Daddy). Thomas also starred in all of the comedy episodes, both those based on his old show and those which were not. It was broadcast Monday nights on NBC in the 9pm (Eastern) time slot. During the latter half of this series run, it was preceded by the highly successful hit of the year, Rowan & Martin's Laugh In. Despite a strong ratings lead-in, the numbers never came in. Cancellation followed and it was replaced by a new NBC Monday Night at the Movies.

== Notable guest stars ==
Notable guest stars included:

- Don Adams
- Lou Antonio
- Eve Arden
- Ken Berry
- Bill Bixby
- Red Buttons
- Angela Cartwright
- Sid Caesar
- Geraldine Chaplin
- Cyd Charisse
- Dane Clark
- Michael Constantine
- Jeanne Crain
- Bing Crosby
- Mary Crosby
- Joan Collins
- Vic Damone
- Bobby Darin
- Sammy Davis, Jr.
- Olivia de Havilland
- Nanette Fabray
- Tennessee Ernie Ford

- Gale Gordon
- Buddy Hackett
- Rusty Hamer
- Bob Hope
- Van Johnson
- Carolyn Jones
- Shirley Jones
- Richard Kiley
- Janet Leigh
- Marjorie Lord
- Donna Loren
- Rose Marie
- Roddy McDowall
- Ricardo Montalbán
- Regis Philbin
- Juliet Prowse
- Sugar Ray Robinson
- Michael Shea
- Phil Silvers
- Marlo Thomas
- James Whitmore
- Andy Williams
- Richard Conte

== Episodes ==
1) "The Wonderful World of Burlesque [fourth edition]" {videotape} (September 11, 1967) Phil Silvers, Cyd Charisse, Nanette Fabray, Tennessee Ernie Ford, guests
2) "Instant Money" {film} (September 18, 1967) featuring Sid Caesar, Don Adams, Abby Dalton, Richard Deacon
3) "The Scene" {film} (September 25, 1967) Robert Stack, Geraldine Chaplin, Michael J. Pollard
4) "It's Greek To Me" {videotape} (October 2, 1967) featuring Juliet Prowse, Vic Damone, Buddy Hackett, Joe Besser
5) "The Demon Under the Bed" {film} (October 9, 1967) Bing Crosby, George Maharis, Joan Collins, Mary Frances Crosby
6) "The Danny Thomas Hour from Sea World" {videotape} (October 23, 1967) John Gary, Maura McGivney, The Young Americans, guests
7) "Fame is a Four-Letter Word" {film} (October 30, 1967) Barry Sullivan, Michael Rennie, Richard Conte, Geraldine Brooks, Aldo Ray, Carolyn Jones
8) "Make More Room For Daddy" {videotape} (November 6, 1967) featuring Marjorie Lord, Rusty Hamer, Angela Cartwright, Sid Melton, Amanda Randolph, Hans Conried, Jana Taylor, Edward Andrews
9) "The Enemy" {film} (November 20, 1967) Sammy Davis Jr., Henry Silva, Peter Brown
10) "The Zero Man" {film} (November 27, 1967) Red Buttons, Nehemiah Persoff, Stephen McNally
11) "The Royal Follies of 1933" {videotape} (December 11, 1967) Shirley Jones, Gale Gordon, Ken Berry, Hans Conried, Bob Hope, guests; Johnny Carson, narrator
12) "The Cricket on the Hearth" {animated film} (December 18, 1967) Roddy McDowall, narrator
13) "Is Charlie Coming?" {film} (December 25, 1967) Van Johnson, Janice Rule, Jack Carter, Alan Hewitt
14) "America, I Love You" {videotape} (January 8, 1968) Andy Williams, Polly Bergen, Van Johnson, Louis Prima, guests
15) "The Cage" {film} (January 15, 1968) Bobby Darin, Dean Stockwell, Lloyd Nolan, Arch Johnson, Sugar Ray Robinson
16) "The Measure of a Man" {film} (January 22, 1968) Richard Kiley, Bradford Dillman, Anne Baxter, Clarence Williams III, Walter Brooke
17) "The Last Hunters" {film} (January 29, 1968) Richard Todd, Olivia DeHavilland, Dane Clark
18) "One For My Baby" {film} (February 5, 1968) Janet Leigh, Ricardo Montalban, Charles Ruggles, Rick Jason, Strother Martin
19) "Fear is the Chain" {film} (February 19, 1968) Van Heflin, Horst Buchholz, May Britt
20) "Thomas at Tahoe" {film} (February 26, 1968)
21) "My Pal Tony" {film; pilot for My Friend Tony, produced by Sheldon Leonard} (March 4, 1968) James Whitmore, Enzo Cerusico, Dorothy Provine, Hal March, Rose Marie, Walter Pidgeon, Jeanne Crain
22) "Two For Penny" {film} (March 11, 1968) featuring Bill Bixby, Donna Loren, Michael Constantine
23) "The Wonderful World of Burlesque [third edition]" {videotape; repeat of December 11, 1966 special} (March 18, 1968) Carol Channing, Mickey Rooney, Wayne Newton, guests

== Bibliography ==
- Tim Brooks and Earle Marsh, The Complete Directory to Prime Time Network and Cable TV Shows 1946–Present, Ninth edition (New York: Ballantine Books, 2007) ISBN 978-0-345-49773-4
- Gianakos, Larry James, Television Drama Series, 1947-1984
