= The Intruder (1975 film) =

2017 American horror film directed by Chris Robinson in 1975

- Promotional poster
- Directed by: Chris Robinson
- Written by: Chris Robinson
- Produced by: Kurt Grothman
- Starring: Chris Robinson; Mickey Rooney; Yvonne De Carlo; Phyllis Robinson; Ted Cassidy
- Cinematography: Jack McGowan
- Music by: Tommy Oliver
- Distributed by: Garagehouse Pictures
- Release date: August 1, 2017 (Blu-ray)
- Running time: 87 minutes
- Country: United States
- Language: English

The Intruder is a 1975 American horror film written and directed by Chris Robinson and starring Mickey Rooney, Ted Cassidy, and Yvonne De Carlo. Its plot follows a group of people who are stalked on an island by a killer while searching for gold.

The film was shelved by its distribution company in 1975, never receiving a theatrical or home video release, and was thought to be a lost film. In 2017, it was announced that a print of the film had been discovered. The film had its first release on Blu-ray by Garagehouse Pictures on August 1, 2017.

== Cast ==
- Chris Robinson as Reardon
- Mickey Rooney as Captain Jennings
- Yvonne De Carlo as DePriest
- Phyllis Robinson as Miss Daniels
- Ted Cassidy

== See also ==
- List of rediscovered films
