= Chris Robinson (American actor) =

American actor (1938–2025)

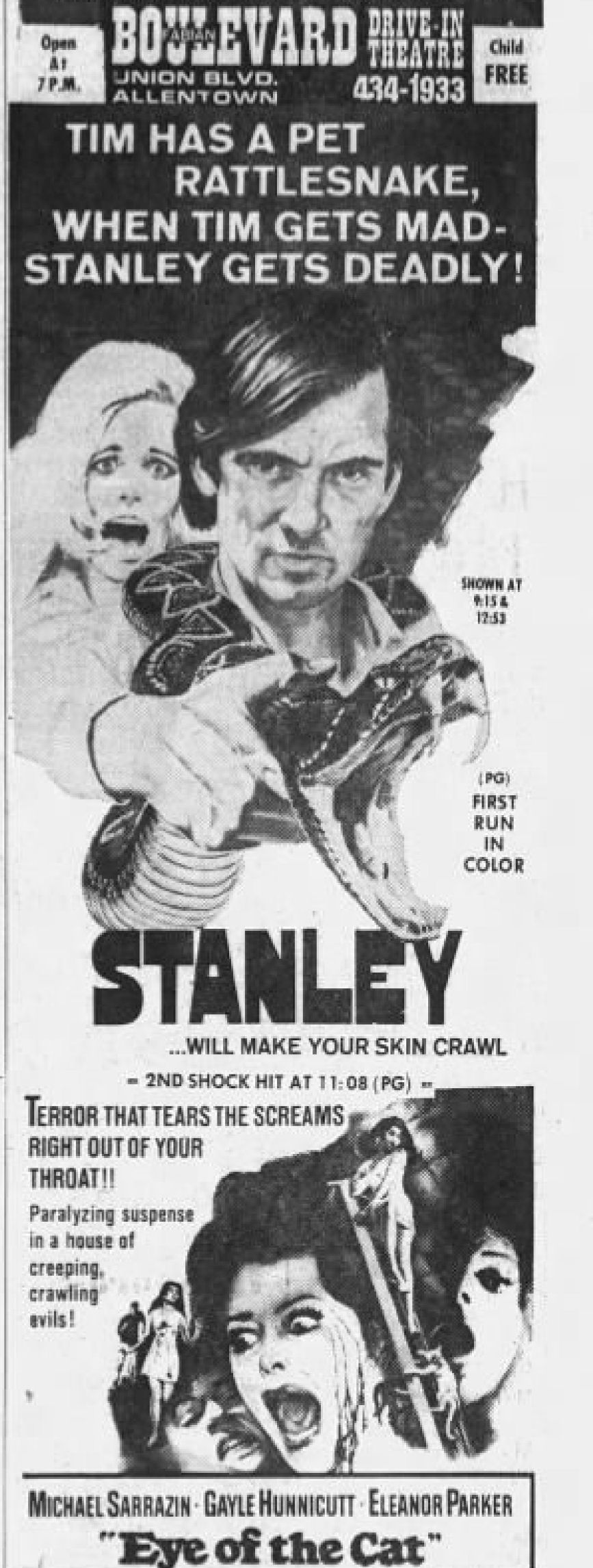
- Chris Robinson depicted in a newspaper advertisement for Stanley (1972)
- Born: November 5, 1938; West Palm Beach, Florida, U.S.
- Died: June 9, 2025 (aged 86); Sedona, Arizona, U.S.
- Other name: Christopher Robinson
- Occupations: Actor; director; writer
- Years active: 1957-2022
- Spouse(s): Fourth wife, Jacquie Shane Robinson
- Children: Five sons from three previous marriages

Christopher Brown Robinson (November 5, 1938 – June 9, 2025) was an American actor, screenwriter, and film director, sometimes credited as Christopher Robinson.

== Career ==
Robinson began his career as an actor in the 1950s. Robinson was a young adult actor and stunt man and appeared in films of the 1950s, such as Diary of a High School Bride, and Beast from Haunted Cave. He was in Combat! Season 1, "The Reunion" in 1962. In the 1960s, he was cast as flight engineer and top turret gunner Technical Sgt. Alexander "Sandy" Komansky on ABC's 12 O'Clock High in the last two seasons. In 1972, he got the lead as a fanatical snake charmer in the horror movie Stanley.

Robinson played Dr. Rick Webber on General Hospital from 1978 to 1986. Following this role, he joined Another World in late 1987, where he played the role of Jason Frame. Robinson then appeared on The Bold and the Beautiful as Jack Hamilton, joining in the early 1990s and leaving after three years. He last appeared in this part in 2005, having made several guest appearances over the years. Robinson returned to General Hospital after a 16-year absence in 2002, and his character of Rick killed in a controversial storyline that altered the back story. In 2013, he appeared in a 50th-anniversary celebration episode as Rick's spirit, making peace with his old rival Alan Quartermaine.

In 1984, Robinson was a spokesman for Vicks Formula 44 cough syrup. The commercials aired on national television, and began with the quote "I'm not a doctor, but I do play one on TV". Robinson was replaced in the commercial by Peter Bergman after Robinson's legal difficulties.

In 2013, Robinson's son Chris made a documentary film about Robinson's obsession with Beanie Babies; Robinson invested $100,000 to purchase numerous Beanie Babies as an investment, but lost the money when the value of the items plummeted.

His last on-screen performance came in the 2022 feature film Just for a Week directed by Michael Jason Allen.

== Personal life and death ==
Robinson was the father of Taylor Joseph Robinson, cast as C.J. Garrison in The Bold and the Beautiful.

He was married to actress Phyllis Yarwood, whom he cast in a few of his movies.

In 1985, Robinson was convicted of income tax evasion. He was allowed to continue his role on General Hospital under a prison work-release provision.

Robinson was married to artist/actress Jacquie (née Shane) Robinson, and he had five sons from three previous marriages.

Robinson died of heart failure in his sleep at his ranch near Sedona, Arizona, on June 9, 2025 at age 86.

== Credits ==
=== Actor ===
- Just for a Week (2022) as Ted Hurst
- Yancey McCord: The Killer That Arizona Forgot About (2020) as Yarnell Fritzowski
- Barely Dreaming (2021) as Bud Millen
- Colt .45 (1960) Season 3 Episode 26: "Appointment at Agoura") as outlaw Tom Sanger
- Dick Powell's Zane Grey Theatre (1960) Season 5 Episode 5: "So Young the Savage Land" as Paul Martin
- Bus Stop (1961) Season 1 Episode 1: "Afternoon of a Cowboy" as Tony Maddox
- The Donna Reed Show (1961) Season 3 Episode 35: "Military School" as Ken
- Hennesey (1961) Season 2 Episode 12: "The Hat" as Larry Stander
- Two Faces West (1961) Season 1 Episode 23: "The Wayward" as Gordie
- Outlaws (1961) Season 1 Episode 12: "The Daltons Must Die, Part 1" as Sonny Buck
- Sea Hunt (1961) Season 4 Episode 37: "Crime at Sea" as Kelsey
- Straightaway (1961) Season 1 Episode 3: "The Nobles Oblige" as Harkey
- The Everglades (1961-1962)
  - Season 1 Episode 11: "Good Boy" as Ralph Martin
  - Season 1 Episode 14: "Young Osceola" as Coley Jarrett
- The Detectives (1961-1962)
  - S2:E15, "The Frightened Ones" as Brad Snyder
  - S3:E17, "The Jagged Edge" as Charles
  - S3:E29, "Strangers in the House" as Grant Harper
- Empire (1962) Season 1 Episode 3: "A Place to Put a Life" as Arnold Koenig
- Cain's Hundred (1962) Season 1 Episode 22: "The New Order" as Jack Hayes
- The New Breed (1962) Season 1 Episode 36: "Walk This Street Lightly" as Clifford Forbes
- Combat! (1963) Season 1 Episode 13: "Reunion" as Private Paul Villette
- The Alfred Hitchcock Hour (1963)
  - Season 1 Episode 17: "Forecast: Low Clouds and Coastal Fog" as Rick 'Ricky' Garrison
  - Season 2 Episode 9: "The Dividing Wall" as Terry
- The Dakotas (1963) Season 1 Episode 2: "Red Sky Over Bismarck" as Chino James
- The Wide Country (1963) Season 1 Episode 18: "Speckle Bird" as Gabriel Horn
- Stoney Burke (1963) Season 1 Episode 29: "A Girl Named Amy" as Ross Webster
- Channing (1963) Season 1 Episode 11: "Beyond His Reach" as Jim Wilson
- Gunsmoke (1963) Season 8 Episode 20: "The Bad One" as Willie Jett
- The Travels of Jaimie McPheeters (1963) Season 1 Episode 6: "The Day of the Skinners" as Billy Bird
- G.E. True (1963) Season 1 Episode 24: "Ordeal" as Holt
- The Fugitive (1963) Season 1 Episode 8: "See Hollywood and Die" as Miles
- Wagon Train (1963-1964)
  - Season 6 Episode 23: "The Sarah Proctor Story" as Brad Proctor
  - Season 7 Episode 25: "The Duncan McIvor Story" as Second Lieutenant Brad Carter
  - Season 8 Episode 2: "Hide Hunters" as Gib Ryker
- Arrest and Trial (1963-1964)
  - Season 1 Episode 3: "Tears from a Silver Dipper" as Private First Class Al Rogers
  - Season 1 Episode 29: "Those Which Love Has Made" as Bradford Holcombe
- The Virginian (1963-1970)
  - Season 2 Episode 6: "It Takes A Big Man"as Henry 'Hank' Anders
  - Season 3 Episode 2: "Dark Challenge" as Arnie Hendricks
  - Season 7 Episode 1: "Saddle Warmer" as Coley
  - Season 9 Episode 10: "Experiment at New Life" as Sandy
- Perry Mason (1965, Season 8 Episode 25: "The Case of the Deadly Debt") as Carl Talbert
- Twelve O'Clock High (1965-1967) as Technical Sergeant Sandy Komansky (regular role)
- Custer (1967) Season 1 Episode 2: "Accused" as Lieutenant Tim Rudford
- Felony Squad (1967) Season 1 Episode 23: "The Desperate Silence" as Vincent Ludi
- The Man from U.N.C.L.E. (1967) Season 4 Episode 10: "The Survivor School Affair")as John Saimes
- Gomer Pyle - USMC (1968) Season 4 Episode 29: "And Baby Makes Three" as Private Howie Reilly
- The Invaders (1968) Season 2 Episode 20: "The Organization" as Mike Calvin
- Voyage to the Bottom of the Sea (1968) Season 4 Episode 25: "The Death Clock" as Corpsman Mallory
- Hogan's Heroes (1969) Season 4 Episode 15: "The Missing Klink" as Karl Wagner
- Cycle Savages (1969) as Romko
- Like a Mighty Army (1970) as Pastor D. James Kennedy
- Barnaby Jones (1977)
  - Season 5 Episode 17: "Duet for Dying" as Harley Nelson
  - Season 6 Episode 7: "Daughter of Evil" as Harry Blenner
- General Hospital (1978-2013) as Dr. Rick Webber
- Amy (1981) as Elliot Medford
- Young Doctors in Love (1982)
- Savannah Smiles (1982) as Richard Driscoll
- Like Father Like Son (1987, uncredited) as Bobby
- Viper (1988) as James Macalla
- Another World (1988-1989) as Jason Frame
- Rez Bomb (2008) as Jaws
- Yancey McCord: The KILLER That Arizona Forgot About (2020) as Yarnell Fritzowski

=== Director ===
- Catch the Black Sunshine (1972)
- Thunder County (1974)
- The Intruder (1975)
- Barnaby Jones for the eipode "Shadow of Guilt" (1976)
- Cannon for the episodes "A Touch of Venom" (1975) and "Point After Death" (1976)
- Baretta for the episode "Shoes" (1976)
