= Eaton, Crane & Pike Company Factory =

- U.S. National Register of Historic Places
- U.S. Historic district
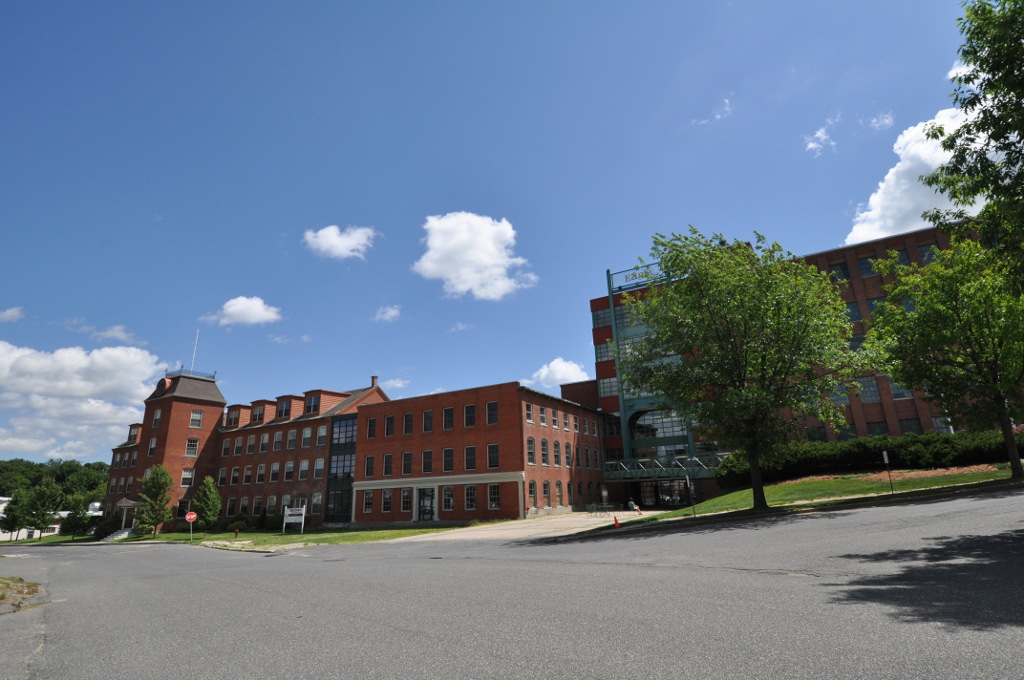

- Location within Massachusetts Location within the United States
- Location: 75 South Church Street, Pittsfield, Massachusetts
- Coordinates: 42°26′47″N 73°15′38″W
- Built: 1883
- Architectural style: Late Victorian
- NRHP reference No.: 90001166
- Added to NRHP: August 3, 1990

The Eaton, Crane & Pike Company Factory, once the Terry Clock Company Factory is a historic former factory complex in Pittsfield, Massachusetts. Developed over a period of years between 1883 and 1967, the complex was home to one of Pittsfield's major paper concerns, and a significant local employer. Now converted to mixed residential and light industrial use, it was listed on the National Register of Historic Places in 1990.

== Description and history ==
The former Eaton factory complex is a series of connected brick buildings, set overlooking a bend in the Housatonic River southwest of downtown Pittsfield. The property is bounded on the north by railroad tracks, and was historically bounded on the east and south by a worker housing area; the latter has largely been obliterated by urban renewal activities. There are nine distinct structures in the interconnected complex, ranging in height from three to eight stories. The most prominent and visually distinctive element is the central clocktower, a 3-1/2 story mansard-roofed structure topped by a flagpole and iron cresting. It was built in 1883, and is one of the oldest surviving elements of the complex.

The oldest portion of the factory was built in 1883 by the Terry Clock Company, which had its origins in the manufacture of clocks by Eli Terry in 1793. That company and its successors owned the facility until 1893, when it was purchased by the Hurlbut Paper Company, which founded a stationery division on the premises headed by Arthur W. Eaton. Hurlbut was acquired by the American Writing Paper Company, but did not want to keep the stationery division, which Eaton and other investors purchased. After a major investment by Crane & Co. principals in 1908, the company was renamed Eaton, Crane & Pike, eventually shortened to just Eaton in 1934. The company was successful until the 1950s, when a general decline in letter-writing led to reduced demand for its products. After several changes of ownership, it was finally closed in 1987. The plant was soon afterward converted into a combination of residential and mixed industrial uses.

== See also ==
- National Register of Historic Places listings in Berkshire County, Massachusetts
