= Ted Cassidy =

American actor (1932–1979)

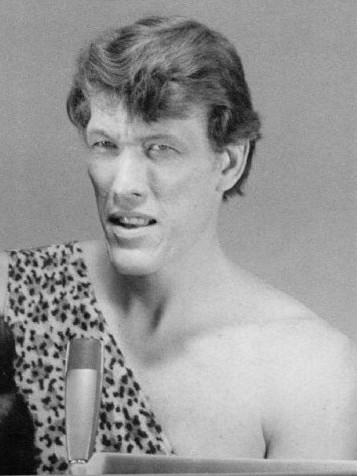
- Cassidy as Tarzan in Storybook Squares (1969)
- Born: Theodore Crawford Cassidy; July 31, 1932; Pittsburgh, Pennsylvania, U.S.
- Died: January 16, 1979 (aged 46); Los Angeles, California, U.S.
- Education: West Virginia Wesleyan (1948-1950)Stetson University (1955, B.A., Speech & Drama)
- Occupation: Actor
- Years active: 1958–1979
- Height: 6 ft 9 in (206 cm)
- Spouse: Margaret Helen Jesse (m. 1956; div. 1975)
- Children: 2

Theodore Crawford Cassidy (July 31, 1932 – January 16, 1979) was an American actor. He tended to play unusual characters in offbeat or science-fiction works, such as Star Trek and I Dream of Jeannie, and he played Lurch on The Addams Family TV series of the mid-1960s. He also narrated the intro sequence for the 1977 live-action The Incredible Hulk TV series and provided the growls and roars for the Hulk for the first two seasons before his death, with actor Charles Napier providing the title character's vocals for the remainder of the series.

== Early life, family and education ==
Cassidy was born in Pittsburgh, Pennsylvania, to Elwood Lewis Cassidy and Emily Cassidy (nee Crawford), who were of Irish ancestry. He was raised, however, in Philippi, West Virginia, where his father was an agent for the Eaton Paper Company. He was academically gifted and attended third grade at age six. During his freshman year of high school, at age 11, he was on the football and basketball teams.

After graduating from high school, Cassidy attended West Virginia Wesleyan College in Buckhannon (1948–50), where he was a member of the Alpha Sigma Phi fraternity. He transferred to Stetson University in DeLand, Florida, where he played college basketball for the Hatters (1954–55) and was active in the student government. He graduated from Stetson University with a BA degree.

== Career ==
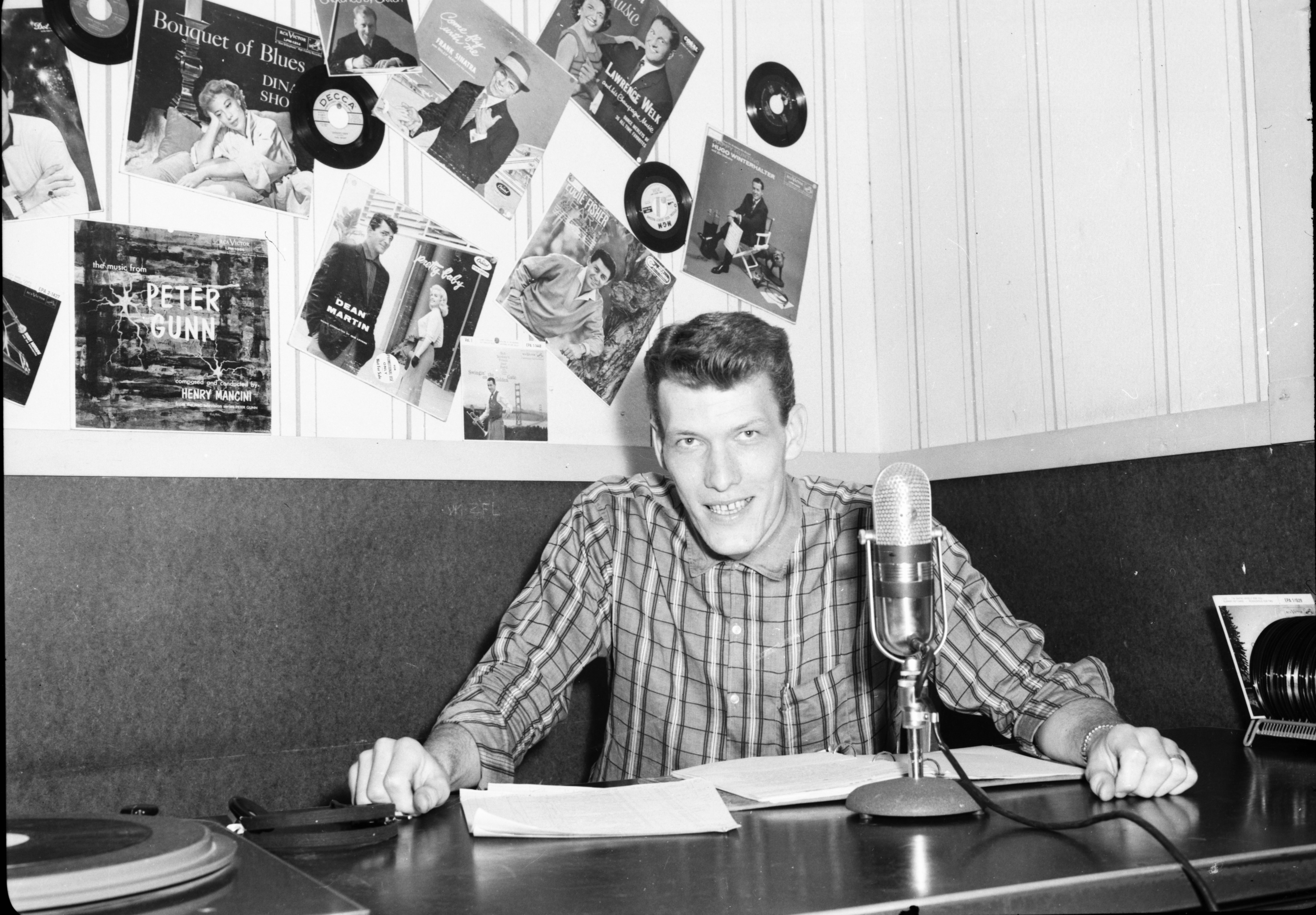
Ted Cassidy on air at WCOA Pensacola January 1959

Cassidy began his broadcast career at WCOA in Pensacola, Florida, during the summer of 1958 and through the fall of 1959. He relocated to Dallas, Texas, to work as a DJ on WFAA. He was an accomplished musician and moonlighted, playing an organ at a Luby's Cafeteria in Dallas' Lochwood Shopping Center. He "was right in the middle of the excitement" on the day John F. Kennedy was assassinated and was among the first to interview eyewitnesses W. E. Newman Jr. and Gayle Newman.

=== Television ===
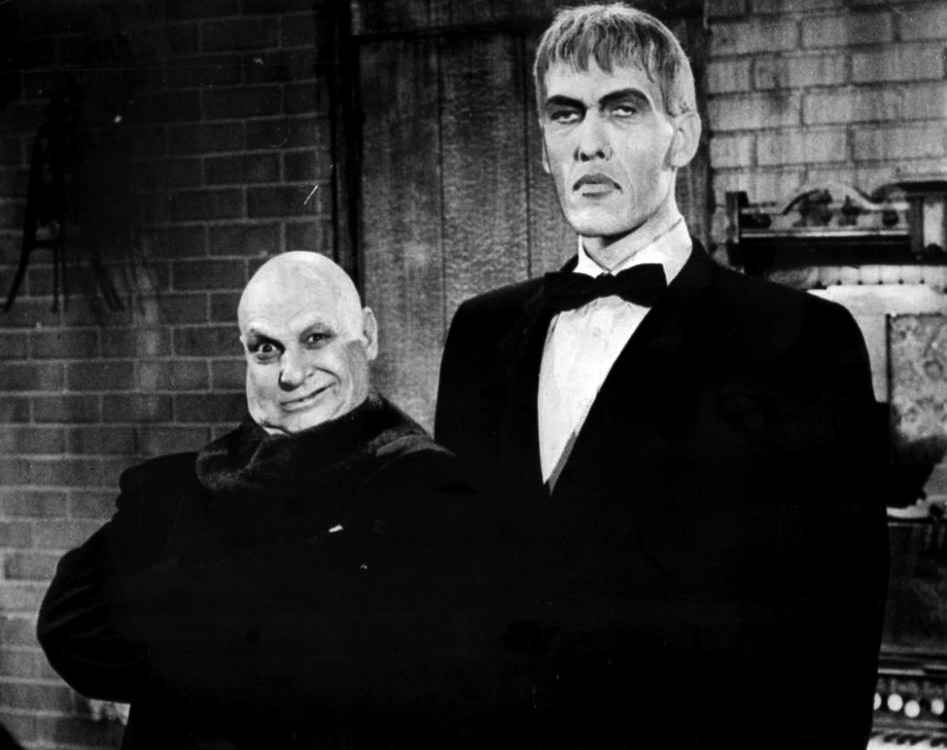
Cassidy (right) in The Addams Family with Jackie Coogan in 1966

Cassidy's height gave him an advantage in auditioning for unusual character roles. His best-known role is Lurch on The Addams Family, in which he feigned playing the harpsichord (although he was in fact an accomplished organist). With a separate contract, he also played the character named Thing, though associate producer Jack Voglin took on the role in scenes involving both characters. Though the character of Lurch was originally intended to be mute, Cassidy's ad-libbed "You rang?" in response to the butler call was an immediate hit. It became his signature line, and he was given more lines. Several episodes were written to feature Lurch.

Cassidy reprised the role of Lurch in later appearances. In the Batman episode "The Penguin's Nest" (1966), he appears during the heroes' familiar climbing scene up the side of a building, as a tenant who is playing the Addams Family theme on a harpsichord prior to sticking his head out of the window and speaking to Batman and Robin. He voiced Lurch in an episode of The New Scooby-Doo Movies (1972), and in the 1973 animated series adaptation of The Addams Family. He again reprised Lurch in the TV film Halloween with the New Addams Family (1977).

According to Thomas "Duke" Miller, a TV/movie/celebrity expert, Cassidy also had a small role opposite George Peppard in one episode of the TV movie series Banacek. Cassidy played a worker in an auto scrapyard who attempted to kill Banacek because the investigator traced him as part of the plot to steal a rare and valuable book. In addition to The Addams Family, Cassidy found steady work in a variety of other television shows. He had a prominent role on NBC's The New Adventures of Huckleberry Finn as Injun Joe, the enemy of Tom Sawyer and Huckleberry Finn. In the 1967 The Man from U.N.C.L.E. episode "The Napoleon's Tomb Affair", Cassidy played a henchman, Edgar, who kidnaps, tortures, and repeatedly tries to kill Napoleon and Illya.

Cassidy also provided the voices of the more aggressive version of Balok in the Star Trek episode "The Corbomite Maneuver" and the Gorn in the episode "Arena", and played the part of the android Ruk in the episode "What Are Little Girls Made Of?". Cassidy did more work with Star Trek creator Gene Roddenberry in the early 1970s, playing Isaiah in the postapocalyptic drama pilots Genesis II and Planet Earth. In the Lost in Space episode "The Thief from Outer Space", he played the Slave to the alien Thief (Malachi Throne), who threatens the Robinsons.

In The Beverly Hillbillies episode "The Dahlia Feud" from 1967, he played Mr. Ted, a large, muscular gardener who plants dahlias for Mrs. Drysdale. In 1968, Cassidy appeared on Mannix in the episode "To Kill a Writer" as Felipe Montoya, on Daniel Boone in "The Scrimshaw Ivory Chart" as a pirate named Gentle Sam, and in two episodes of I Dream of Jeannie as the master of Jeannie's devious sister in the episode "Genie, Genie, Who's Got the Genie?", and Jeannie's cousin in the episode "Please Don't Feed the Astronauts".

In the two-part The Six Million Dollar Man episode "The Return of Bigfoot" (1976), Cassidy provided the body and vocal effects of Bigfoot (the role was originally played by professional wrestler André the Giant in a previous two-parter). Cassidy reprised the role in the 1977 episode "Bigfoot V".

Cassidy also starred in Bonanza's "Decision in Los Robles" in 1970.

=== Other film and TV work ===
Concurrent with his appearances on The Addams Family, Cassidy began doing character voices on a recurring basis for the Hanna-Barbera Studios, culminating in the role of Frankenstein Jr., in Frankenstein Jr. and The Impossibles series, and even reprising Lurch on several occasions for Hanna-Barbera productions (most notably for the Addams Family animated series in 1973–74). He was the voice of Meteor Man in Birdman and the Galaxy Trio, as well as the hero in the Chuck Menville pixillated short film Blaze Glory, in which his already-deep voice was enhanced with reverb echo to give the character an exaggerated super-hero sound. Cassidy also voiced Ben Grimm ("The Thing") in The New Fantastic Four. Cassidy went on to perform the roars and growls for Godzilla in the 1979 cartoon series that Hanna-Barbera co-produced with Toho, and was also the voice of Montaro in the Jana of the Jungle segments that accompanied Godzilla during its first network run. His voice was the basis for the sinister voice of Black Manta, as well as Brainiac and several others on Super Friends. Cassidy was the original voice of Moltar and Metallus on Space Ghost from 1966 to 1968. Cassidy's final role was as King Thun of the Lion Men in the television animated feature film Flash Gordon: The Greatest Adventure of All. That particular role was originally recorded shortly before Cassidy's death in 1979, until the decision was made to use the footage for a television series, The New Adventures of Flash Gordon. As such, Cassidy's death necessitated his role being recast for the series with Allan Melvin. After the series' conclusion, the original feature film and soundtrack were reassembled using Cassidy's performance and broadcast in prime time in 1982. In live-action productions for the TV series The Incredible Hulk, he provided narration of the title sequence, and the Hulk's growls and roars. In deleted scenes from the original Battlestar Galactica TV pilot movie, "Saga of a Star World", Cassidy can be heard providing temporary voice tracks of the Cylon Imperious Leader, before actor Patrick Macnee was contracted to voice the character.

Other film work includes Butch Cassidy and the Sundance Kid (1969), Mackenna's Gold (1969), The Limit (1972), Banacek (1972),Charcoal Black (1972), The Slams (1973), Thunder County (1974), Poor Pretty Eddie (1975), Harry and Walter Go to New York (1976), The Last Remake of Beau Geste (1977) and Goin' Coconuts (1978). Alongside Michael Werner, he co-wrote the screenplay of 1973's The Harrad Experiment, in which he made a brief appearance. During that time, he also worked with Noel Marshall, the executive producer of Harrad Experiment, on the adventure-comedy film Roar (released two years after his death).

In 1965, he released a single on Capitol Records with "The Lurch", written by Gary S. Paxton, and "Wesley", written by Cliffie Stone and Scott Turner. He introduced the dance and performed the song "The Lurch" on September 11, 1965, on Shivaree! and performed it again on Halloween of the same year on Shindig!

== Health issues and death ==
Contrary to rumors, and despite being 6 ft 9 in (2.06 m) tall, Cassidy did not suffer from gigantism. This has been debunked by his son Sean Cassidy.

Cassidy underwent surgery at St. Vincent Medical Center in Los Angeles to have a benign tumor removed from his heart. Complications arose several days later while he was recuperating at home. He was readmitted to the same hospital, where he died on January 16, 1979, at age 46. He was cremated and his ashes were buried in the backyard of his home in Woodland Hills. His family had a private funeral service for him at Forest Lawn Memorial Park.

== Filmography ==
Year	Title	Role	Notes
1959	The Angry Red Planet	Martian	Voice, uncredited
1964–1966	The Addams Family	Lurch	64 episodes
1966	The Girl from U.N.C.L.E.	Tullio	Episode: "The Montori Device Affair"
1966	Lost in Space	Slave	Episode: "The Thief from Outer Space"
1966	Batman	Lurch	Episode: "The Penguin's Nest"
1966	Star Trek	Ruk	S1:E7, "What Are Little Girls Made Of?"
1966	Star Trek	Voice of Balok Puppet	S1:E10, "The Corbomite Maneuver"
1967	Star Trek	Gorn	S1:E18, "Arena"
1966–1967	Frankenstein Jr. and The Impossibles	Frankenstein Jr.	Voice, 18 episodes
1967	The Phyllis Diller Show	Maxie	Episode: "Portrait of Krump"
1967	The Monroes	Teddy Larch	Episode: "Wild Bull"
1967	Jack and the Beanstalk	The Giant	Voice, TV movie
1967	Laredo	Monte	Episode: "The Small Chance Ghost"
1967	The Beverly Hillbillies	Mr. Ted	Episode: "The Dahlia Feud"
1967	Mr. Terrific	Bojo	Episode: "Stanley Joins the Circus"
1967	Super President	Spy Shadow	Voice, one episode
1967	Birdman and the Galaxy Trio	Meteor Man	Voice, twenty episodes
1967	Insight	The Jury	Episode: "Fat Hands and a Diamond Ring"
1967	Fantastic Four	Galactus	Voice, episode: "Galactus"
1968	Daniel Boone (1964 TV series)	Sam "Gentle Sam"	Episode: "The Scrimshaw Ivory Chart"
1968	I Dream of Jeannie	Hamid / Habib	Two episodes
1968	Tarzan	Sampson	Episode: "Jungle Ransom"
1968	Mannix	Felipe Montoya	Episode: "To Kill a Writer"
1968–1969	The New Adventures of Huckleberry Finn	Injun Joe / Morpho / Monster	Voice, 20 episodes
1969	Mackenna's Gold	Hachita	
1969	Butch Cassidy and the Sundance Kid	Harvey "Kid Curry" Logan	
1970	Bonanza	Garth	Episode: "Decision at Los Robles"
1971–1976	McDonaldland	Officer Big Mac	Voice, five episodes
1972	The New Scooby-Doo Movies	Lurch	Voice, Episode: "Wednesday Is Missing"
1972	The Limit	Donnie "Big Donnie"	
1972	Ironside	The Wrestler	Episode: "Who'll Cry for My Baby"
1972	Charcoal Black	Striker	
1973	Banacek	Jerry Crawford	Episode: "Ten Thousand Dollars a Page"
1973	Genesis II	Isiah	TV movie
1973	The Harrad Experiment	Diner Patron	Uncredited
1973	The Addams Family	Lurch	Voice, sixteen episodes
1973	The Slams	Glover	
1974	Planet Earth	Isiah	TV movie
1974	The Great Lester Boggs		
1974	Thunder County	Cabrini	
1975	The Intruder		
1975	Poor Pretty Eddie	Keno	
1976	Harry and Walter Go to New York	Leary	
1976	The Bionic Woman	Bigfoot	Episode: "The Return of Bigfoot: Part 2"
1976–1977	The Six Million Dollar Man	Bigfoot	Two episodes
1976–1979	Tarzan, Lord of the Jungle	Phobeg	Voice, 36 episodes
1977	The Great Balloon Race		
1977	Benny and Barney: Las Vegas Undercover	Jake Tuttle	TV movie
1977	The Last Remake of Beau Geste	Blindman	
1977	Space Sentinels	Agent Kronos	Episode: "The Time Traveler"
1977	The All-New Super Friends Hour	Crag	Two episodes
1977	Halloween with the New Addams Family	Lurch	TV movie
1977–1979	The Incredible Hulk	Voice of Incredible Hulk / The Narrator	76 episodes
1977–1980	Captain Caveman and the Teen Angels	Creature / Bruno / Additional voices	Voice, 39 episodes
1978	The Flintstones: Little Big League	Police Officer	Voice, TV movie
1978	Sugar Time!		Episode: "Sugar to the Rescue"
1978	Man from Atlantis	Canja	Episode: "Scavenger Hunt"
1978	Chico and the Man	Bruno	Episode: "Help Wanted"
1978	Dr. Strange	Demon Balzaroth	Voice, uncredited, TV movie
1978	Dinky Dog	Additional voices	Voice, 16 episodes
1978	Goin' Coconuts	Mickey	
1978	Fangface	Additional voices	Voice, Two episodes
1978	Yogi's Space Race	Additional voices	Voice, seven episodes
1978	Greatest Heroes of the Bible	Goliath	Episode: "David and Goliath"
1978	Jana of the Jungle	Montaro	Voice, 13 episodes
1978	The Fantastic Four	The Thing	Voice, 13 episodes
1978	Challenge of the Superfriends	Black Manta / Brainiac / Diamond Exchange Man / Barlock / Gorilla Guard #1 / British Soldier	Voice, 16 episodes
1978	Cowboysan	Baddie	Short film
1978–1979	Godzilla	Godzilla	Voice, 26 episodes
1979	The Flintstones Meet Rockula and Frankenstone	Frankenstone	Voice, TV movie, posthumous release
1979	The Plastic Man Comedy/Adventure Show	Additional voices	Voice, posthumous release
1981	Roar		Additional script material, posthumous release
1982	Flash Gordon: The Greatest Adventure of All	King Thun	Voice, TV movie, final film role, posthumous release

== Honors ==
Since 2021, Cassidy's hometown of Philippi, West Virginia, has held an annual celebration of the actor known as Lurch Fest.

Preceded by None	Actors portraying Moltar; 1966–1968	Succeeded by C. Martin Croker

Preceded by None	Actors portraying Metallus; 1966–1968	Succeeded by Michael Tew
