= Tammy Locke =

American actress and performer (born 1959)

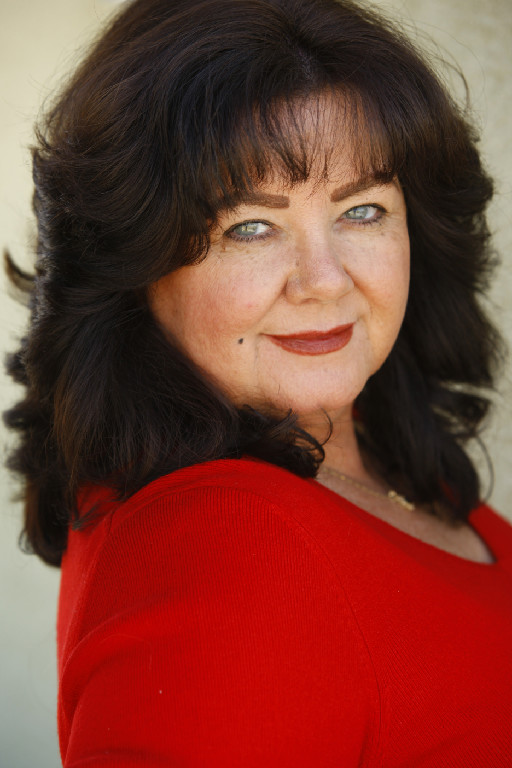
- Born: September 19, 1959 (age 66); California, U.S.
- Occupations: Actress, singer

Tammy Locke (born September 19, 1959) is an American actress and performer, known for her work as a child actor in The Monroes and other films and TV series.

== Early life ==
Locke's parents both worked for Northrop Corporation; her father Earl as a leadman in electrical maintenance, and her mother Lola in template control. Earl Locke's father had been a vaudeville performer.

== Career ==
Locke began her acting career at the age of two years. She acted in an episode of the anthology series ALCOA Premiere, The Voice of Charlie Pont (ABC, 1962) as Sally Laurents, the daughter of characters played by Robert Redford and Diana Hyland. She went on to play a similar role in 1965 melodrama Once a Thief, as the daughter of Ann-Margret and Alain Delon and niece of Jack Palance, and early the following year played Tootie Smith in the ABC television comedy pilot Meet me in St. Louis.

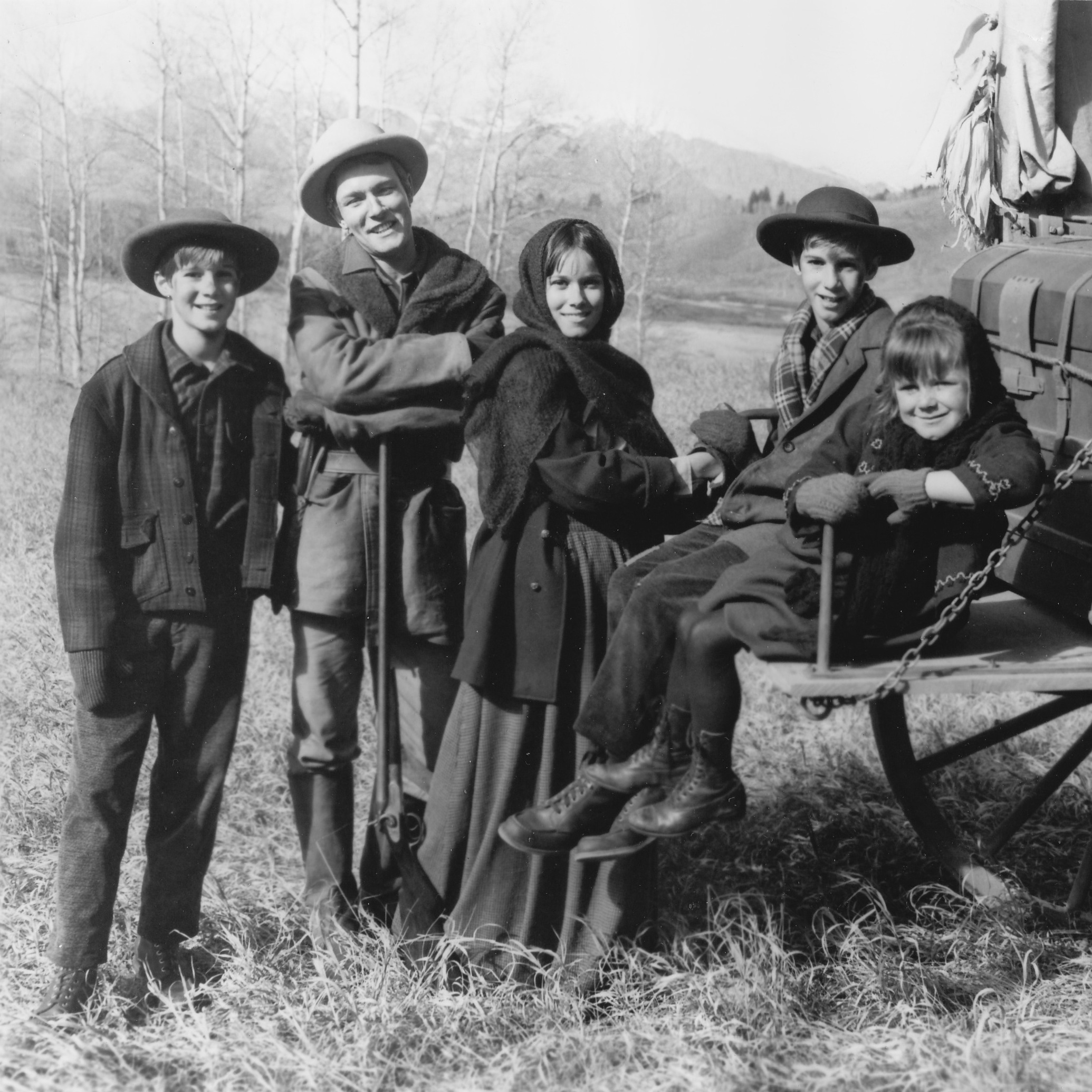
Locke (right) with the cast of The Monroes

In the 26-episode ABC television series The Monroes, broadcast in 1966 and 1967, Locke, aged six, played Amy Monroe, the youngest of a group of siblings who had to care for themselves in northwestern Wyoming in the Wild West. She was described by the Christian Science Monitor as "an especially endearing little dumpling" for her performance in the series, which was filmed at 20th Century Fox television in Century City, California. Locke was unpredictable and "tumultuous" on set, giving a live frog as a gift to the show's hairdresser. But also, despite her young age, Locke worked on the set on a par with everyone.

While filming Once a Thief she objected to a scene where she comforted her wounded, blood-soaked and dying father, on the grounds that, "I've got new clothes on and my mother will be very mad if they get dirty". On one occasion she responded to directorial criticism by pulling on the director's beard. In 1967, she played the role of Elizabeth Baker on the Gunsmoke series in the episode "Baker's Dozen".

Locke's final film appearance as a child actor was in Hang 'Em High which starred Clint Eastwood. Her acting work also included television commercials and voiceover recordings. As an adult, she worked as a roller derby skater, radio presenter, and as a singer including with the band The California Express, whose last album was produced by Tex Williams in 1981.

== Personal life and family ==
Locke has a husband Tom and son Robby. Her sister Sharyl was also a child actor, appearing in Father Goose with Cary Grant and Leslie Caron, and in I Saw What You Did with Joan Crawford and John Ireland, while her older sister Lorna acted in stage productions.
