= The Monroes (1966 TV series) =

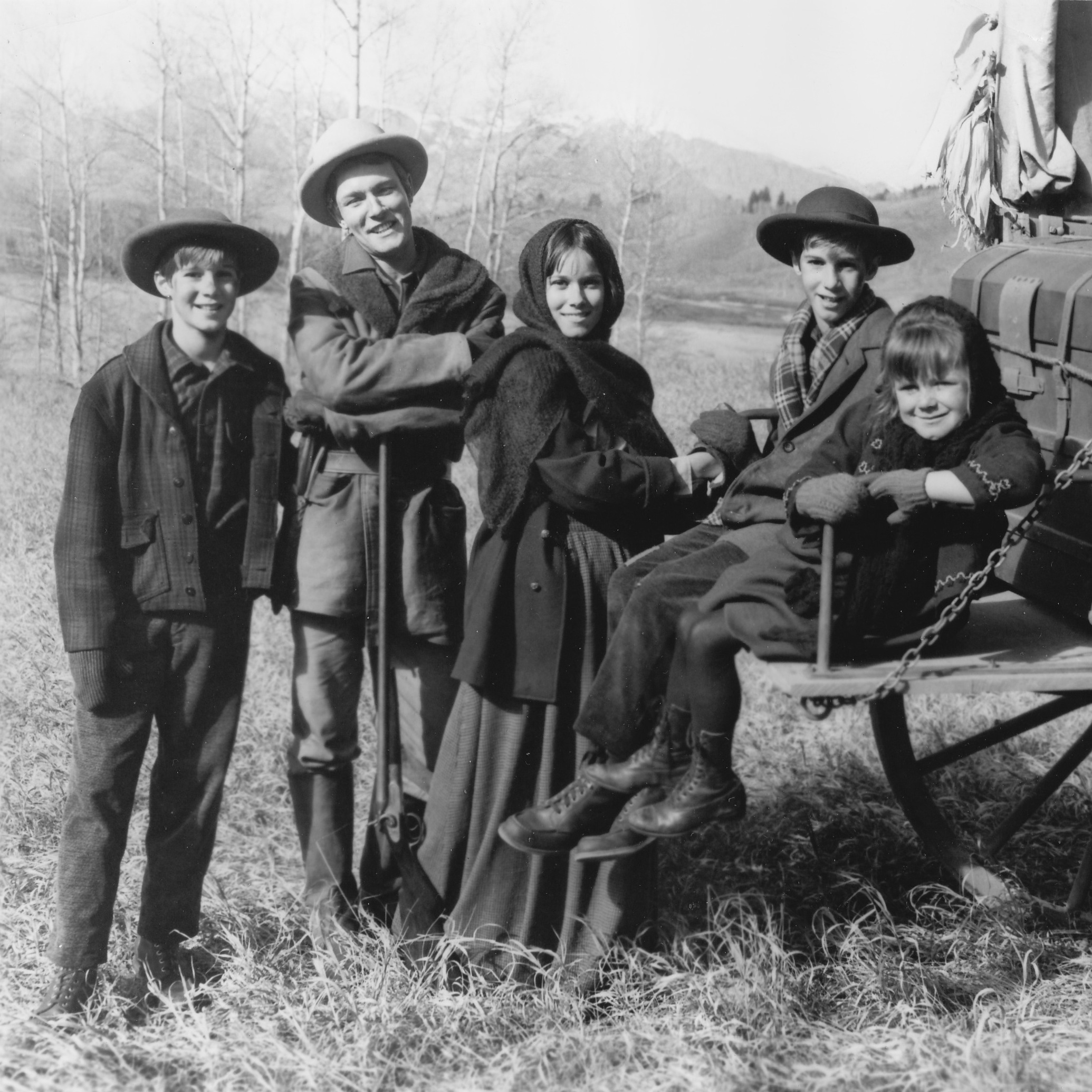
- Created by: Milt Rosen
- Starring: Michael Anderson Jr.; Barbara Hershey; Keith Schultz; Kevin Schultz; Tammy Locke
- Country of origin: United States
- Original language: English
- No. of seasons: 1
- No. of episodes: 26

Production
- Running time: 60 minutes
- Production companies: Qualis Productions; 20th Century-Fox Television

Original release
- Network: ABC
- Release: September 7, 1966 – March 15, 1967

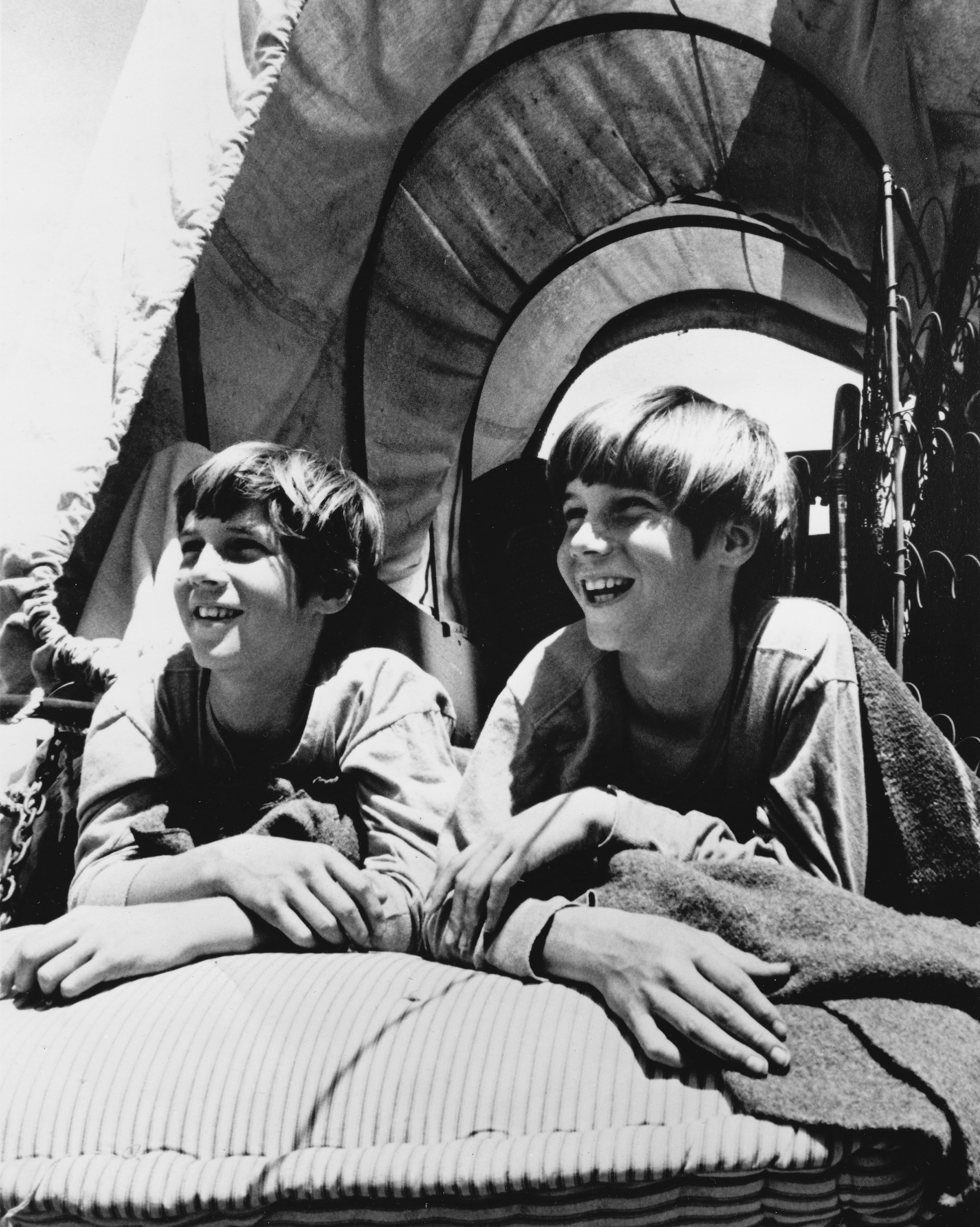
Keith and Kevin Schultz (1966)

The Monroes is a Western television series, which originally aired on ABC during the 1966–67 season.

== Premise ==
The series centered on five orphans trying to survive as a family on the frontier in the area around what is now Grand Teton National Park near Jackson, Wyoming. Their parents die in an accident in the first episode, and they try to carry on without them.

The orphans were helped by a Native American friend named Jim. Their neighbor was Major Mapoy, a British cattle baron who wanted the Monroes' land. He relented, though, and allowed the Monroes to remain, after learning that their father staked a claim before the major's arrival in the area. Major Mapoy had his men build a house for the orphans, and he became a good neighbor.

== Cast ==
=== Starring ===
- Michael Anderson Jr. as eldest brother, Clayt Monroe
- Barbara Hershey as eldest sister, Kathy Monroe
- Keith Schultz as Jefferson "Big Twin" Monroe
- Kevin Schultz as Fenimore "Little Twin" Monroe
- Tammy Locke as youngest sibling, Amy Monroe

=== Recurring ===
- Ron Soble as Jim (19 episodes)
- Liam Sullivan as Major Mapoy (17 episodes)
- Ben Johnson as Sleeve (14 episodes)
- James Westmoreland as Ruel Jaxon (12 episodes)
- Robert Middleton as Barney Wales (six episodes)
- Buck Taylor as John "Brad" Bradford (four episodes)
- James Brolin as Dalton Wales (four episodes)

== Production ==
The series was produced by Qualis in association with 20th Century Fox Television. Filming took place on location in Jackson Hole, Wyoming as well as Century City, California.

== Home media ==
The Monroes was first released on DVD by Shout! Factory on September 6, 2016. The DVD set includes all 26 original episodes from the series' single broadcast season. The product was initially released exclusively in Walmart stores, but was later made widely available.

== Episodes ==
No.	Title	Directed by	Written by	Original release date	Prod. code
1	"The Intruders"	Bernard L. Kowalski	Otis Carney	September 7, 1966	6031
2	"Night of the Wolf"	Tom Gries	Harold Gast	September 14, 1966	8102
3	"Ride with Terror"	Earl Bellamy	Penrod Smith	September 21, 1966	8106
4	"Forest Devil"	James B. Clark	Carey Wilber	September 28, 1966	8105
5	"Wild Dog of the Tetons"	James B. Clark	Donald S. Sanford	October 5, 1966	8108
6	"Incident at the Hanging Tree - AKA Truth Has No Family"	Larry Peerce	Halsted Welles	October 12, 1966	8112
7	"Ordeal by Hope"	James B. Clark	Harold Gast	October 19, 1966	8111
8	"The Hunter"	Tom Gries	Anthony Lawrence	October 26, 1966	8104
9	"War Arrow"	Robert Totten	Donald S. Sanford	November 2, 1966	8107
10	"The Friendly Enemy"	Carey Wilber	James B. Clark	November 9, 1966	8114
11	"Court Martial"	John Dunkel	Robert L. Friend	November 16, 1966	8115
12	"Silent Night, Deadly Night"	Norman Foster	Mary Worrell	November 23, 1966	8117
13	"Lost in the Wilderness"	Ray Kellogg	Antony Ellis	November 30, 1966	8109
14	"Gold Fever"	James B. Clark	Jack Turley	December 14, 1966	8103
15	"Range War"	Larry Peerce	Antony Ellis	December 21, 1966	8113
16	"Pawnee Warrior"	Harmon Jones	Jim Leighton	December 28, 1966	8116
17	"Mark of Death"	James B. Clark	Story by : Calvin Clements, Jr. Teleplay by : Halsted Welles	January 4, 1967	8111
18	"To Break a Colt"	Norman Foster	Thomas Thompson	January 11, 1967	8118
19	"Race for a Rainbow"	Norman Foster	John Furia, Jr.	January 18, 1967	8119
20	"Gun Bound"	William Wiard	Arthur Dales	January 25, 1967	8120
21	"Killer Cougar"	R.G. Springsteen	Louis Pelletier	February 1, 1967	8121
22	"Wild Bull"	Robert Douglas	William Tunberg	February 15, 1967	8122
23	"Trapped"	Norman Foster	John Elton & Laura Earl	February 22, 1967	8123
24	"Manhunt"	Robert Douglas	Arthur Dales	March 1, 1967	8124
25	"Teach the Tigers to Purr"	Norman Foster	Barbara Chain	March 8, 1967	8125
26	"The Ghosts of Paradox"	William Wiard	Otis Carney	March 15, 1967	8126
