= George Griffin (butler) =

African-American confidant of Mark Twain

George H. Griffin
- Born: 1849; Baltimore, Maryland
- Died: 1897 (aged 47–48)
- Known for: Confidant of Mark Twain

George H. Griffin was an African-American born into slavery in Baltimore, Maryland in 1849. In 1874, as a free man, Griffin came to work for Samuel L. Clemens (a.k.a. Mark Twain). Details of Griffin's early life remain largely unknown, but there is much information about Griffin's later life, primarily from Clemens's letters and unpublished memoirs. For example, according to Clemens' unpublished manuscript A Family Sketch, Griffin "was a Maryland slave by birth; the Proclamation set him free, & as a young fellow he saw his fair share of the Civil War as body servant to General Devens".

Griffin was a Deacon in the Metropolitan African Methodist Episcopal Church, active political leader, and family man. He married servant Rhoda Marrian Hayes about 1871, in Hartford, Connecticut. He was remembered as having a knack for making money and lending funds back to the African American community. Clemens describes him as:

...handsome, well built, shrewd, wise, polite, always good-natured, cheerful to gaiety, honest, religious, a cautious truth-speaker, devoted friend to the family, champion of its interests.... He was the peace-maker in the kitchen—in fact the peace-keeper, for by his good sense & right spirit & mollifying tongue he adjusted disputes in that quarter before they reached the quarrel-point.

Griffin worked as the Clemens' family butler for 17 years and appears to have been very close to the family (even after Griffin purchased a house in the city, he maintained a room at Clemens's home in Hartford). This was the period in which Clemens wrote Adventures of Huckleberry Finn, and Griffin may have been an inspiration for the character Jim, one of two major characters in the novel. He died in 1897.
