= Jim (Huckleberry Finn) =

Fictional Mark Twain character

- Adventures of Huckleberry Finn character
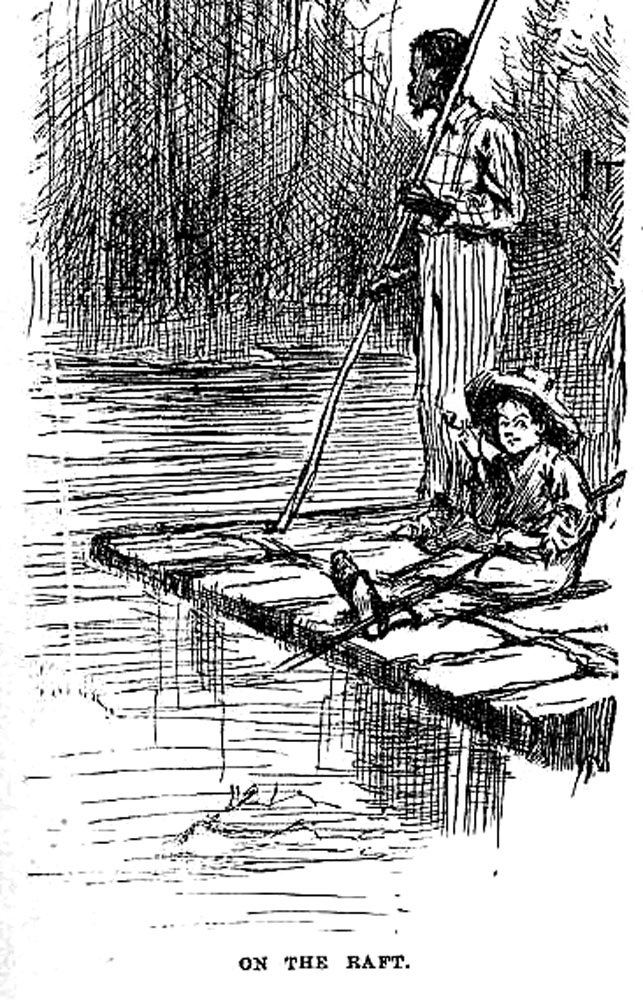
- Jim standing on a raft alongside Huck
- Created by: Mark Twain

In-universe information
- Gender: Male
- Spouse: Unnamed wife (Note: Jim's wife is only mentioned in passing in Huckleberry Finn, and her name is not mentioned in that book. She was given the name Sadie by Nancy Rawles in My Jim (2005). Jim's wife is also referred to by the name "Sadie" in the short story "Rivers" by John Keene, which appears in his collection Counternarratives (2015). She is similarly named Sadie in Percival Everett's 2024 novel, James.)
- Children: Elizabeth (daughter); Johnny (son)

Jim is one of two major characters in the classic 1884 novel Adventures of Huckleberry Finn by Mark Twain. The book chronicles his and Huckleberry Finn's raft journey down the Mississippi River in the antebellum Southern United States. Jim is a black man who is fleeing slavery; Huck, a 13-year-old white boy, joins him in spite of his own conventional understanding and the law.

== Character inspiration ==
The character may have been a composite portrait of black men Twain knew, or based on the "shrewd, wise, polite, always good-natured" George Griffin, a former slave whom Twain employed as a butler and treated as a confidant.

Twain grew up in the presence of enslaved people in Hannibal, Missouri, and listened to their stories; those people included his parents' slaves, and the slaves kept by his uncle.

== Fictional biography ==
Jim's is one of the several spoken dialects called deliberate in a prefatory note. Academic studies include Lisa Cohen Minnick's 2004 Dialect and Dichotomy: Literary Representations of African American Speech and Raphaell Berthele's 2000 "Translating African-American Vernacular English into German: The problem of 'Jim' in Mark Twain's Huckleberry Finn".

While the racial slur "nigger" is used extensively throughout the novel, Jim is only referred to as "nigger Jim" once, in the note Huck Finn writes to Miss Watson in Chapter XXXI ("Miss Watson, your runaway nigger Jim...."). Jim himself is introduced at the beginning of Chapter Two, seen at midnight by the two boys, Huck and Tom, standing silhouetted in the doorway of the outdoor detached kitchen. He hears them approach and inquires into the darkness; he states that he will wait to hear the sound repeated, and he sits at the doorway until he dozes, relieving the hidden narrator's tension indicated by an entire paragraph on an itch unscratched because of fear, of which Jim is unaware.

Jim flees from his owner after overhearing her discussing whether or not to sell him for 800 dollars. He meets up with Huck on Jackson's Island. The two travel on a raft together, and Jim plans to reach Cairo, Illinois, so that he can be free and buy his family's freedom as well.

His character and perceptions dominate the novel and include spirituality, parental tenderness, and nonviolence: he leaves unmolested two rogues – Jim's term is "rascals" – who have taken over the raft despite their vulnerability as they sleep drunk.

When the rogues sell Jim as an escaped slave, the character Tom Sawyer arrives. Tom knows that Jim is a free man by this point, having been freed by his owner, Miss Watson, in her will, but he uses the opportunity of Jim's being imprisoned to act out prison-escape fantasies from books he has read, refusing Huck's simpler plans that would free Jim easily, but without the drama that Tom sought. Jim, who is now on a plantation owned by Tom's aunt and uncle, is freed by the boys. However, Tom is shot by a pursuer. Jim gives up his freedom to help nurse Tom back to health, and is taken back to the plantation in chains. Upon waking up, Tom admits that he knew Jim was free the whole time, and Jim is released. Tom pays Jim 40 dollars, and the trio depart.

== Academic reception ==
As a study of a slave escaping, Huckleberry Finn is largely sympathetic to the plight of escaped slaves and critical of the institution of slavery.

However, beginning in the 20th century, the novel was frequently criticized for depicting Jim as a stereotype, and Tom as an aggressor. According to Professor Stephen Railton of the University of Virginia, Twain was unable to fully rise above the stereotypes of black people that white readers of his era expected and enjoyed, and therefore resorted to minstrel show–style comedy to provide humor at Jim's expense and ended up conforming to rather than challenging late 19th-century racist stereotypes.

== Portrayals ==
Actors who have portrayed Jim in films and TV:

- George H. Reed (1920)
- Clarence Muse (1931)
- Rex Ingram (1939)
- Frederick Spencer (1944)
- Archie Moore (1960)
- Serge Nubret (1968 in Les Aventures de Tom Sawyer)
- Feliks Imokuede in (1973 in Hopelessly Lost)
- Paul Winfield (1974 and 1990)
- Antonio Fargas (1975)
- Blu Mankuma (1979)
- Samm-Art Williams (1986)
- Courtney B. Vance (1993)
- Jacky Ido (2012)
- Miles Mussenden (2014)
- Daniel Edward Mora (2015)
- Deren Tadlock (2016 in Jean-Claude Van Johnson as Victor playing Jim in a fictional movie)

=== Books ===
Percival Everett's 2024 book James, portrays The Adventures of Huckleberry Finn from Jim's perspective and adds an alternative ending to the story. Similarly, the 2024 graphic novel Big Jim and the White Boy: An American Classic Reimagined by David F. Walker and Marcus Kwame Anderson reinterprets the story from Jim's perspective, and follows Jim's descendants on their own journeys.

== See also ==
- List of films featuring slavery
