= James (novel) =

2024 book by Percival Everett

- Author: Percival Everett
- Language: English
- Genre: Novel
- Publisher: Doubleday
- Publication date: 2024
- Publication place: United States
- Pages: 320
- Awards: National Book Award for Fiction; Kirkus Prize; Pulitzer Prize for Fiction
- ISBN: 978-0385550369

James is a novel by American author Percival Everett published by Doubleday in 2024. The novel is a reimagining of Adventures of Huckleberry Finn by Mark Twain but narrated by Huckleberry's friend on his travels, the fugitive slave Jim, rather than by Huck, as in the original. The novel won the 2024 Kirkus Prize, the National Book Award for Fiction, and the 2025 Pulitzer Prize for Fiction.

== Story ==
James is loosely based on Mark Twain's Adventures of Huckleberry Finn, with various scenes recontextualized or ending differently. The novels differ because, when Jim and Huck are separated, we learn Jim's story from Jim, rather than, as in Twain's original, Huck's story from Huck. Many characters are also reinterpreted.

In Hannibal, Missouri, Jim, a slave owned by the elderly Miss Watson, survives day-to-day by following social conventions known to every slave he encounters, including his wife Sadie and daughter Lizzie. While speaking standard English to each other (and privately indulging in irony and gallows humor inspired by the perils of slave life), they scrupulously code-switch to an unsophisticated patois in front of any white person, and play to type by behaving as ignorant and superstitious, to avoid the danger of drawing attention. They also allow white people to take credit for all initiatives and ideas, since proactive gestures, however innocent, risk corporal punishment.

Huckleberry "Huck" Finn, adopted child of the Widow Douglas and Miss Watson, freely confides in Jim, while questioning Jim about the ways of the world, such as why slavery exists. Jim takes care to buoy Huck's spirits while staying in character.

Learning that Miss Watson will sell him off, Jim flees, planning to return for his family. He hides out on nearby Jackson Island, meeting Huck, who has faked his own death to escape his abusive father. Jim and Huck flee and survive together in the wilderness. During a flood, Jim finds Huck's father dead inside a washed-away house, and keeps Huck from recognizing the body.

Jim survives a rattlesnake bite, but has a fever dream inspired by his secret autodidactic readings in Judge Thatcher's library. He debates a hallucinated Voltaire, criticizing the philosopher's belief in polygenism, and protesting that slaves may not advocate for their own civil rights, relying on privileged men like Voltaire to do so. Talking in his sleep, Jim accidentally breaks character and confuses Huck.

The two boat down the Mississippi River, finding loot from a shipwreck; Jim voraciously reads a cache of books, but soon needs to organize his own thoughts on paper. Their raft is destroyed, and Jim washes up alone in Illinois, meeting a group of cautiously friendly slaves, who advise that he cannot buy his family's freedom without a white man's help. One of the slaves steals a pencil stub for Jim, and is first lashed and then hanged, obliging Jim to solemnly record his own story in writing.

Jim is reunited with Huck, then separated again. Jim ends up bought by Daniel Decatur Emmett to join his blackface singing troupe, the Virginia Minstrels. Jim is caught off-guard to be treated with courtesy and respect by the avowedly anti-slavery troupe, but realizes that Emmett will nevertheless keep him as bonded labor—and that he faces certain death if their audience outs him as black.

Jim escapes the troupe with Emmett's notebook, writing his story alongside the derogatory minstrel songs within. His escape inspires Norman, a former slave passing as white in the troupe, to follow suit. Because Norman also wishes to buy his wife's freedom, Jim has Norman pose as his master, so that they can swindle slave buyers for money. Norman successfully sells Jim to a sawmill; Jim brings along a slave girl, Sammy, in his escape to save her from rape at the miller's hands. She is shot and killed by their pursuers.

Jim and Norman stow away on a steamboat, which is destroyed by a boiler explosion. Finding Huck among the overboard passengers, Jim chooses to save him over Norman. Asked by Huck to explain why, Jim confesses that he is Huck's birth father and drops his character. Though disappointed that Jim could not trust him all this time, Huck insists on returning to Hannibal with Jim, even as Jim exhorts him to make his own choices. When they arrive in Hannibal, Jim learns that Sadie and Lizzie have been sold, but he fails to discover where to.

Meanwhile, the American Civil War has broken out, but Jim understands that this will not truly free him. John Locke appears in a dream, explaining slavery as a war that can only be ended by the victor. In another dream, Jim meets Cunégonde from Voltaire's Candide; she explains that he will remain owned, if not as a slave, then as human capital.

No longer fearing retribution, Jim kills a rapist slave overseer in vengeance, then forces Sadie and Lizzie's location from Judge Thatcher at gunpoint. Finding them at a slave-breeding plantation, he launches a guerilla attack and incites a mass breakout. Journeying north to Iowa, he identifies himself as James.

== Characters ==
Jim (James) – The novel's eponymous protagonist and first-person narrator, Jim is an approximately 27-year-old enslaved man owned by Miss Watson. The narrative's inciting incident occurs when Jim learns of Miss Watson's plan to sell him, and he determines to emancipate himself and, eventually, his family. Unlike in Adventures of Huckleberry Finn, where he is depicted as simple, credulous, and superstitious, Everett’s Jim is skeptical, deeply calculating, and secretly more literate and erudite than most of the white people around him. Indeed, Everett's Jim is an ironic inversion of Twain's, insofar as the near totality of Jim's personality in Twain's novel is revealed, in Everett's novel, to be a self-preservationist act put on to avert white suspicion. Jim carefully performs the role expected of him by white society while finding his own covert ways to resist. It is only near the end of the novel that Jim directly reveals himself to be Huck's biological father.

Huckleberry Finn (Huck) – A young, rebellious white-passing boy who escapes from the abusive Pap. While part of a racist society, Huck is more open-minded than other white characters. Both Twain's and Everett's novels suggest that Huck's relative (though not complete) lack of bigotry is at least partly due to how he has lived much of his life as something of an outsider to society as a whole, and so he has not been as thoroughly indoctrinated by Southern white ideals. He develops a strong bond with Jim, which grows deeper and more complicated when he learns that Jim is his biological father. Huck's journey is as much about moral awakening as it is about survival, and the discovery of his Black heritage forces him to reckon with the arbitrary and hollow nature of white racial prejudice.

The King and the Duke – A pair of white con men who invite themselves along for part of the journey. Their real names are never divulged but, in an effort to enthrall Jim and Huck, they pose as the lost Dauphin of France and the lost Duke of Bridgewater. The two charlatans are largely defined by their callous opportunism, and they ultimately betray Jim by trying to sell him. These two characters also feature in Twain's novel, but Everett draws a more detailed and sinister portrait through Jim's perspective.

Daniel Decatur Emmett – A real historical figure and founder of one of the first minstrel troupes in the U.S. In the novel, he purchases Jim to perform in his troupe, but Jim escapes and purloins Emmett's notebook to continue recording his own story, symbolizing Jim's journey towards self-expression and reclaimed identity. Before losing the notebook, Emmett used it to compose songs for the minstrel shows; some of his material appears in the opening of the novel, which begins with "The Notebook of Daniel Decatur Emmett", featuring lyrics from various songs.

Norman – A former slave who, as a free man, passes for white. He illustrates a conflicted experience of "passing", which carries certain advantages for Norman but that he describes as "exhausting". Norman is part of the traveling minstrel show run by Emmett, who briefly purchases (or, as Emmett tries to frame it, "hires") Jim. After Norman helps Jim escape from his exploitative captor, he becomes one of Jim's closest allies, but he ultimately dies in a riverboat accident.

Sammy – An enslaved teenage girl who briefly escapes the lumber mill with Jim and Norman. When Jim first meets the taciturn Sammy, he mistakes her for a young man; upon learning otherwise, he identifies her with his own daughter and feels compelled to take her along when he escapes the mill with Norman. Tragically, Sammy is murdered by their white pursuers.

Judge Thatcher – The local judge who, in Adventures of Huckleberry Finn, helps protect Huck's money by keeping it away from the greedy and abusive Pap. While Twain's novel depicts Judge Thatcher as a kind and fair man who contrasts with the corruption and cruelty found in other parts of society, Everett's reinvention of the character presents more ambiguity as it explores the judge's complicity in the inhumane system of slavery. One of the judge's most salient narrative roles is indirect, in the form of his extensive library that has allowed Jim to secretly educate himself over the years. Judge Thatcher is among the novel's most educated characters, and he is shocked and intimidated to eventually discover Jim's extensive learning.

Sadie and Lizzie – Jim’s wife and daughter. Though they seldom appear directly in the narrative, they are ever-present as the driving force behind Jim's actions as he endeavors to reunite with his family. These names for Jim's family originated in the 2005 novel My Jim by Nancy Rawles. Twain tells the story of Jim's escape through the eyes of Huckleberry Finn. My Jim tells it from the perspective of Sadie, and James from the perspective of a reimagined Jim.

== Reception ==
=== Reviews ===
Writing for The New York Times, Dwight Garner praised the novel as more successful than many reimaginings of famous classics, stating, "What sets 'James' above Everett's previous novels, as casually and caustically funny as many are, is that here the humanity is turned up — way up. This is Everett's most thrilling novel, but also his most soulful." Writing for The Guardian, Anthony Cummins stated: "'James' offers page-turning excitement but also off-kilter philosophical picaresque." In the Chicago Review of Books, Garrett Biggs wrote that the "book can be read and enjoyed and written about without the slightest nod to its predecessor". In Cleveland Review of Books, the Twain scholar, Matt Seybold, catalogued the ways James was not only attentive to the novel it was loosely adapting, but the enormous body of criticism published in the twentieth century. "There’s no way to kill the demon catfish which is Mark Twain’s hypercanonical novel, even if one were so inclined, which I don’t think Everett is," Seybold writes, "The best a critic-dogger might hope to do, more even than I would’ve ever thought possible, is to put a fist in Huck Finn’s throat and leave it there, the two texts made permanent appendages of one another."

Evan Grillon of the Los Angeles Review of Books was lukewarm in his praise, writing that "it’s more interesting, unfortunately, to consider the architecture and philosophy of James, or to compare Huckleberry Finn to James, than it is to actually read James." In a starred review, Kirkus Reviews said of the book, "One of the noblest characters in American literature gets a novel worthy of him." Sam Sacks in The Wall Street Journal wrote, "The overwhelming presence of such much meaningless brutality is the most important revision in 'James.' 'Huckleberry Finn' is a work of great moral seriousness but it's joyously told because it's about freedom—Huck's freedom ..., but ... James is a slave and Huck is not, and a slave is by definition never free." Writing for Afisha Daily, Russian critic Egor Mikhaylov notes the “equal respectfulness and irreverence” with which Everett approaches Twain’s novel, suggesting that the novel’s use of a dual name for its protagonist may echo Mark Twain’s sketch Sociable Jimmy, whose titular Black boy is sometimes mentioned among the inspirations for Huck Finn.

James appeared on 33 lists of the best books of the year.

=== Awards ===
Awards for James
Year	Award	Result	Ref.
2024	Barnes & Noble Book of the Year	Won	
2024	Booker Prize	Finalist	
2024	Foyles Book of the Year	Shortlisted	
2024	Kirkus Prize for Fiction	Won	
2024	National Book Award for Fiction	Won	
2024	Orwell Prize	Shortlisted	
2025	Aspen Words Literary Prize	Finalist	
2025	Audie Award for Literary Fiction or Classics	Won	
2025	Audie Award for Fiction Narrator	Finalist	
2025	Libby Book Award - Fiction	2nd place	
2025	Libby Book Award - Historical Fiction	Won	
2025	PEN/Faulkner Award for Fiction	Finalist	
2025	Pulitzer Prize for Fiction	Won	

== Film adaptation ==
Feature film rights in the novel were acquired in 2024 by Universal Pictures, with Amblin Entertainment for production and Steven Spielberg as executive producer. Taika Waititi was in early talks as director.

== See also ==
- Big Jim and the White Boy: An American Classic Reimagined, another reimagining of the Adventures of Huckleberry Finn with Jim as the protagonist
