= Red Hood: The Hill =

American comic book

- Cover of Red Hood: The Hill #0 (April, 2024). Art by Sanford Greene.

Publication information
- Publisher: DC Comics
- Schedule: Monthly
- Format: Limited series
- Genre: Superhero
- Publication date: April – September 2024
- No. of issues: 7

Creative team
- Written by: Shawn Martinbrough
- Penciller(s): Tony Akins (#0-3 & 5); Sanford Greene (#4 & 6)
- Inker(s): Stefano Gaudiano (#0-3); Shawn Martinbrough (#5); Sanford Greene (#3-4 & 6)
- Letterer: Troy Peteri
- Colorist(s): Paul Mounts (#0-3); Matt Herms (#4-6)
- Editor(s): Ben Abernathy (#0-3); Ben Meares; Katie Kubert (#4 & #6); Dave Wielgosz (#4-6); Rob Levin (#5)

Collected editions
- Red Hood: The Hill: ISBN 9781799500391

Red Hood: The Hill is a comic book limited series published by DC Comics in April 2024. The series is written by Shawn Martinbrough and illustrated by Sanford Greene, serving as a reimagining of the 2000 one-shot Batman: The Hill by Christopher Priest and Martinbrough. It follows Jason Todd, also known as Red Hood, as he returns to his former neighborhood, The Hill, in the aftermath of the Joker War.

The story explores the turmoil in the area due to gang violence and social unrest, with Jason finding himself caught between new vigilantes striving to protect the community and criminals aiming to establish dominance. The series is praised for its focus on the lives of ordinary people in Gotham and Jason's personal journey as he confronts his past while trying to help those around him.

== Publication history ==
Red Hood: The Hill was originally a story called Batman: The Hill. First released in 2000, and written by Christopher Priest and illustrated by Shawn Martinbrough, the 2000 one-shot focused on a neglected Gotham neighborhood overlooked by both Batman and the police. Now, 24 years later, the story has been reimagined, with Jason Todd, returning to his old neighborhood. He finds himself caught between new vigilantes trying to protect the area and criminals from the past still causing trouble. Writer Shawn Martinbrough shared that the original story was meant to highlight the hopelessness of the neighborhood. In this new version, Jason faces his own demons, trying to guide others without making the same mistakes he once did.

== Premise ==
In Red Hood: The Hill #0, Jason Todd returns to his old neighborhood in Gotham, The Hill which is now embroiled in a gang war following the Joker War. As he reconnects with Dana Harlowe, a small businesswoman who also a vigilante, he learns about the rising tensions and threats from a ruthless ganglord determined to take control of the area as an act of revenge against heroes. Jason also meets Dana's sister, Denise, a TV anchor and activist who believes vigilantes are a danger to the community due to personal losses. Throughout the story, Jason grapples with his own complicated history and relationships while trying to protect his neighborhood. As he navigates the escalating conflict, he faces off against various criminals and encounters Killer Croc, who is depicted with more depth than just a typical villain.

Red Hood: The Hill #1 focuses on the everyday people affected by Gotham's crime, rather than just the big heroes and villains. ComicBook.com noted that the story feels different because it shows how regular people deal with the chaos of the city. While it's a Red Hood story, the first issue sets up by looking at the lives of those in Gotham's Hill neighborhood. They noted that the pace is slower than in previous issues, but it shows potential by focusing on the characters and their struggles.

ComicBook.com also noted that the issue feels like a continuation of Red Hood: Outlaw, and readers might need some background knowledge, like the Joker War and Red Hood's recent history, to fully understand. They highlighted how the art by Sanford Greene adds a lot to the story, with strong, emotional visuals that don't always need words. Matt Herms' colors were also praised for making the scenes even more impactful. They noted how the combination of writing, art, and colors brings the story to life, making it feel real and grounded.

== Critical reception ==
Ray Goldfield of GeekDad rated Issue 0 nine out of ten, praising its compelling characters and complex dynamics, suggesting it could be one of the best Jason Todd stories in years. In the following Goldfield appreciates how the story focuses on the everyday people of Gotham, comparing it to Gotham Central by Rucka and Brubaker. He praises Sanford Greene's expressive and unique artwork, noting that this combination of strong storytelling and captivating art could make it a "sleeper hit," while, ComicBook.com's Nicole Drum points out that it has a slower pace than usual for a Red Hood story, but she highlights that strong character development is what makes the story work, setting it apart from others that rely more on action.

In Issue 2, GeekDad gave it a score of 9.0, calling it the best Jason Todd-led series in years, while ComicBook.com rated it 6.0, noting that it feels similar to the first issue, with a few more details and complexity. For Issue 3, GeekDad rated it an 8.5, mentioning that while it diverges from the tone of earlier issues, the creative team has effectively brought the neighborhood to life, making the change feel significant. ComicBook.com gave it a 5.0, criticizing that Red Hood remains mostly sidelined and that the story feels like it is just treading water.

In Issue 4, GeekDad rated it 8.5, praising the creative team for crafting a compelling world in the Hill. They highlighted how the larger superhero conflicts in Gotham disrupt the lives of ordinary residents, making the story more impactful. ComicBook.com rated it 6.0, stating that the story seems unsure of its direction during action sequences, although the personal storyline between Karlee Jr. and his father is becoming more engaging.

In Issue 5, GeekDad rated it 8.5, noting the series' strength in portraying the human consequences of superhero battles, including property damage and civilian casualties, which add significant stakes to each fight. ComicBook.com gave it a 7.0, recognizing the balance of costume action and social themes, which makes for a tense and interesting read. However, they expressed concern that including Batman might distract from the story's core street-level focus. In the final Issue, GeekDad rated it 8.5, praising the series for its strong elements and Martinbrough's skillful portrayal of Gotham, although he noted that the format occasionally hindered the series. ComicBook.com rated it 6.0, stating that while the issue isn't bad, it falls into predictability.

== Collected editions ==
Title	Material collected	Pages	Publication date	ISBN
Red Hood: The Hill 2024	Red Hood: The Hill #0-6. (Note: Issue 0 is a collection of Red Hood and the Outlaws #51-52.)	184	February 2025	9781799500391

== See also ==
- List of Batman comics
- Robin (comic book)
- Batgirl (comic book)
