= David F. Walker =

American comic book writer & novelist

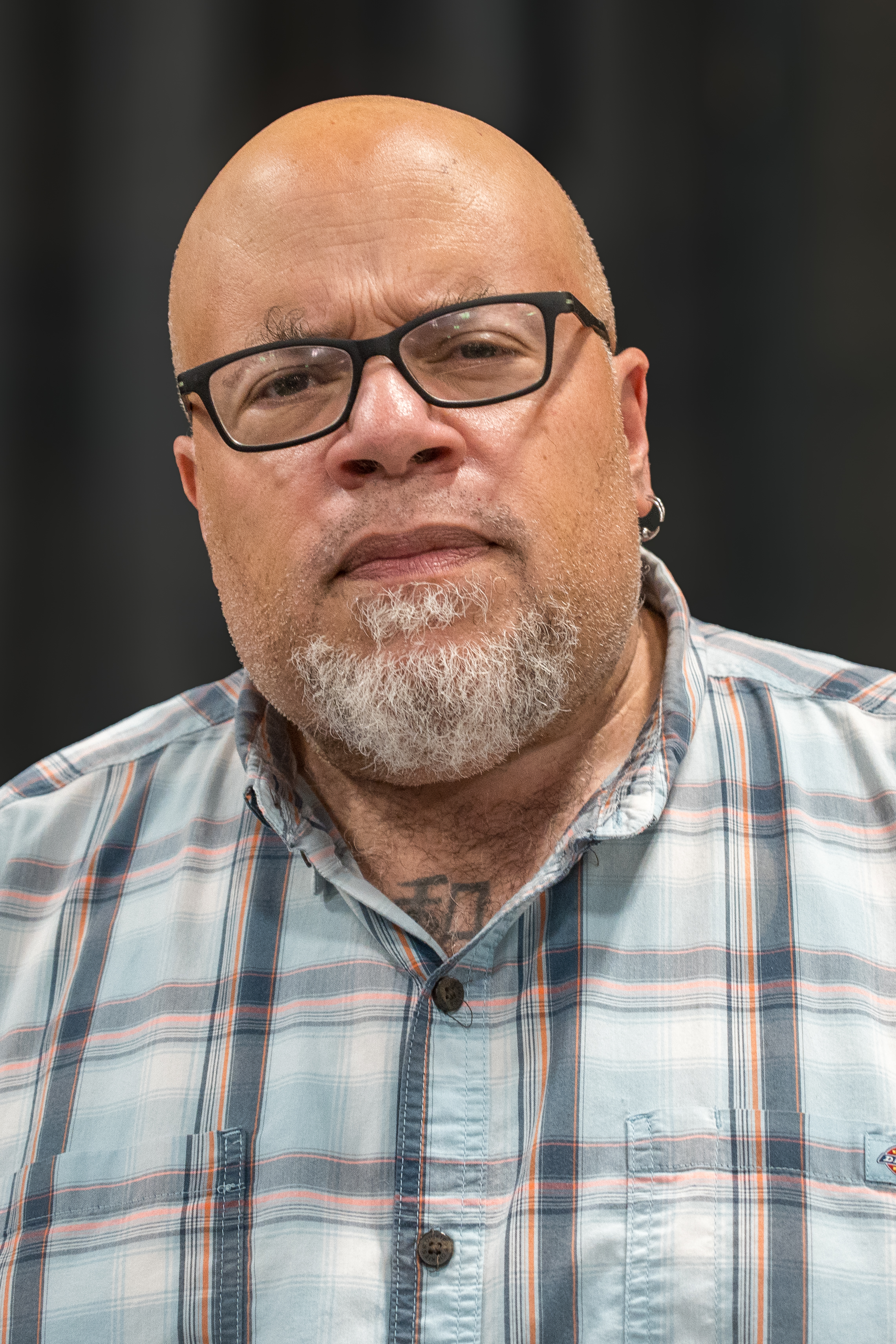
- Walker at Comic Con Oakland 2026
- Area: Writer
- Notable works: Bitter Root; Naomi McDuffie
- Awards: Three Eisner Awards including: Best Continuing Series (2020 and 2022); Best Reality-Based Work (2022); Inkpot Award (2023)

David F. Walker is an American comic book writer and novelist. He is known for creating the fictional DC Universe character Naomi McDuffie, who is the main character of The CW series Naomi. He also created the independent comic book series Bitter Root.

== Career ==
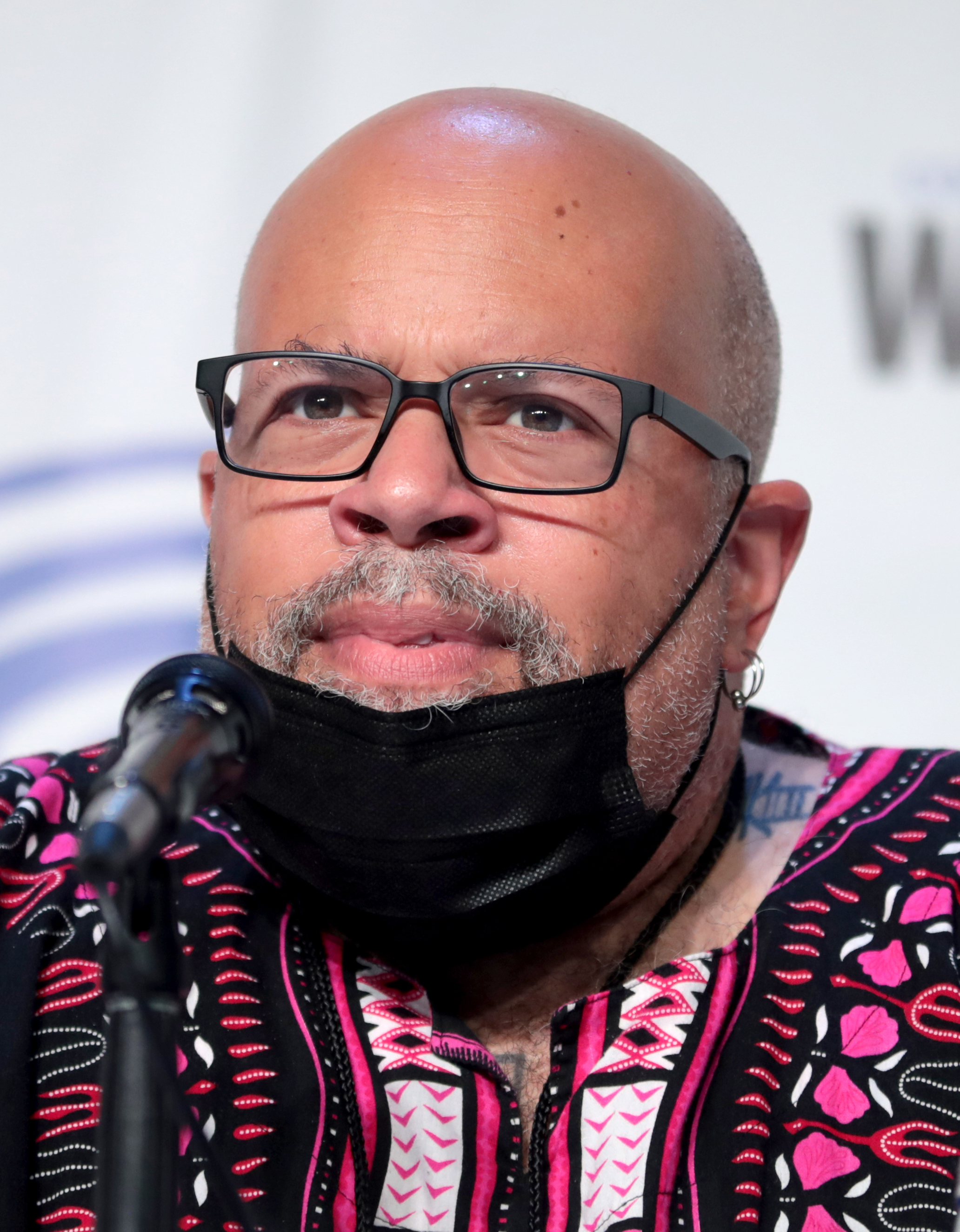
Walker at the 2022 WonderCon

Walker discussing comics and black culture with Brian Michael Bendis in 2017

Walker began his career writing about film and comic books in the 1990s, publishing work on his website and the zine BadAzz MoFo, which he founded in 1996. He later began writing for comic book publishers and magazines such as Dark Horse Comics and Giant Robot.

Walker co-wrote the graphic novel Shaft: A Complicated Man for Dynamite Entertainment in 2015. It won the Glyph Award for Story of the Year, and was nominated for the Dwayne McDuffie Award for Diversity in Comics. That year, he also wrote the novel Shaft's Revenge, which was originally published in serialized form as a digital download to accompany the Shaft comics.

Walker and Sanford Greene co-wrote the 2016 revival of Marvel Comics' Power Man and Iron Fist, which featured the characters of Luke Cage and Danny Rand. Walker also wrote for DC Comics' Cyborg during this time.

Walker and Brian Michael Bendis co-created the character of Naomi McDuffie, who debuted in the DC Comics' series Naomi in 2018. A television series of the same name, created by Ava DuVernay and Jill Blankenship, aired on The CW.

In 2019, Walker founded Solid Comix, a crowdfunded comics publisher. Through Solid Comix, he published original graphic novels such as Bitter Root, co-written with Greene and Chuck Brown, and The Hated. The Hated, which follows the bounty hunter Araminta Free through an alternate history of the post-Civil War United States, was acquired by Netflix in 2021. It was announced that Michael Starrbury was attached to write the series.

In 2019, Walker wrote The Life of Frederick Douglass, a historical graphic novel biography of Frederick Douglass, which was published through Ten Speed Press. It was included in the American Library Association's list of "Great Graphic Novels for Teens". His graphic novel with Marcus Kwame Anderson, The Black Panther Party, which contains biographies of fifteen Black Panther leaders, was published by Ten Speed Press in 2021.

He contributed to the anthology series The Old Guard: Tales Through Time. He also currently co-writes Superb for Lion Forge Comics and Victory, a spin-off of Vampirella, for Dynamite Entertainment.

It was announced in 2023 that Walker was writing a new Planet of the Apes comics series for Marvel.

In 2024, Walker and Anderson reimagined Mark Twain's Adventures of Huckleberry Finn as a graphic novel titled Big Jim and the White Boy. Omitting Twain's negative portrayal of African Americans, Big Jim and the White Boy depicting Jim as the primary protagonist and Huckleberry Finn as his sidekick. The plot involves Jim and Huck journeying through Civil War-era United States to rescue the former's enslaved wife and children and even becoming Underground Railroad agents, before going throughout the decades as generations of Jim's descendants fight for their rights.

That same year, Walker published his first YA novel through Scholastic, The Second Chance of Darius Logan.

On March 5, 2025, Walker announced on his blog that he was reviving BadAzz MoFo on Patreon. While most of the associated film reviews are still available to read for free, a few are only available to subscribers.

== Awards and nominations ==
In 2023, Walker was a recipient of the Inkpot Award at the annual San Diego Comic Con.

Year	Title	Award	Result	Reference
2020	Bitter Root	Dragon Award for Best Comic Book	Nominated	
2020	Bitter Root	Eisner Award for Best Continuing Series	Won	
2022	Bitter Root	Eisner Award for Best Continuing Series	Nominated	
2022	The Black Panther Party: A Graphic History	Eisner Award for Best Reality-Based Work	Won	
2023	-	Inkpot Award	Nominated	
2025	Big Jim and the White Boy	Eisner Award for Best Publication for Teens	Nominated	
2025	Big Jim and the White Boy	Ringo Award for Best Original Graphic Novel	Nominated	
2025	Big Jim and the White Boy	NAACP Image Award for Outstanding Graphic Novel	Nominated	
