= NAACP Image Award for Outstanding Graphic Novel =

Literary award from the NAACP

This article lists the winners and nominees for the NAACP Image Award for Outstanding Graphic Novel. The award was first given in 2024.

== Winners and finalists ==
Award winners and finalists
| Year | Author | Title | Result | Ref. |
|---|---|---|---|---|
| 2024 | The Talk | Darrin Bell | Winner | |
| 2024 | Curlfriends: New in Town | Sharee Miller | Nominee | |
| 2024 | Ms Davis: A Graphic Biography | Sybille Titeux de la Croix, Amazing Améziane | Nominee | |
| 2024 | Queenie: Godmother of Harlem | Aurelie Levy, Elizabeth Colomba | Nominee | |
| 2024 | Stamped from the Beginning: A Graphic History of Racist Ideas in America | Ibram X. Kendi, Joel Christian Gill | Nominee | |
| 2025 | Punk Rock Karaoke | Bianca Xunise | Winner | |
| 2025 | Big Jim and the White Boy | David F. Walker and Marcus Kwame Anderson | Nominee | |
| 2025 | Black Defender: The Awakening | David Washington, Zhengis Tasbolatov and Billy Blanks | Nominee | |
| 2025 | Gamerville | Johnnie Christmas | Nominee | |
| 2025 | Ghost Roast | Shawneé Gibbs, Shawnelle Gibbs and Emily Cannon | Nominee | |
| 2026 | Parable of the Talents: A Graphic Novel Adaptation | Octavia E. Butler, adapted by Damien Duffy and John Jennings | Winner | |
| 2026 | Creaky Acres | Calista Brill, Nilah Magruder | Nominee | |
| 2026 | Defiant: The Story of Robert Smalls | Rob Edwards, Darrell May, Sean Damien Hill and Alex Paterson | Nominee | |
| 2026 | One Crazy Summer: The Graphic Novel | Rita Williams-Garcia, Sharee Miller | Nominee | |
| 2026 | They Choose Violence | Sheldon Allen, Mauricio Campetella | Nominee | |
