= 1000 (webcomic) =

Webcomic

1000 is a webcomic created by Chuck Brown and Sanford Greene and published on WEBTOON from 2017 to 2018. The webcomic tells the story of Dragon Son, a supreme entity who have abandoned the creation and now have to complete a thousand acts of repentance.

In 2018, 1000 received the Ringo Award for Best Webcomic.
