= Helen Krich Chinoy =

American historian (1922–2010)

- Born: Helen Krich; September 25, 1922; Newark, New Jersey, United States
- Died: May 24, 2010 (aged 87); Turners Falls, Massachusetts, United States
- Education: New York University, Columbia University
- Occupation: theater historian
- Known for: documenting the role of women in United States theater
- Notable work: Actors on Acting (1949), Directors on Directing (1953)
- Spouse: Ely Chinoy (d. 1975)
- Children: one daughter, one son
- Awards: shared Emmy Award for Broadway's Dreamers: The Legacy of the Group Theatre (PBS)

Helen Krich Chinoy (September 25, 1922 – May 24, 2010) was an American theater historian who documented the role of women in United States theater.

== Biography ==
Helen Krich was born on September 25, 1922, in Newark, New Jersey. She was awarded bachelor's and master's degrees from New York University, where she majored in English. She later earned her doctorate, also in English, from Columbia University. Together with Toby Cole, she co-authored the 1949 book Actors on Acting in 1949 which was a collection of pieces about the theater from Ancient Greece to the modern stage. She wrote an essay to introduce the book, which has been used over the years as a college textbook. She and Cole wrote the 1953 compilation Directors on Directing as a followup to their first book, providing a historical perspective on the director's craft, primarily using their own writings. These two books on acting and directing, which have remained in print since their first publication, were described as "her most influential work".

Before joining the faculty of Smith College in 1953, Chinoy taught at Rutgers University from 1944 to 1948 and Queens College and spent time teaching at the University of Leicester from 1963 to 1964 during a five-year break while she was working on her doctorate. Chinoy spent some 30 years at Smith College, serving as chairwoman of the school's theater department from 1968 to 1971. Ar Smith, Chinoy lectured on acting, directing, the history of theater, Shakespeare and the contributions of women on the stage. Her 1976 book Reunion: A Self-Portrait of the Group Theater focused on the founders of the Group Theatre, and its role in the development of method acting. Together with Linda Walsh Jenkins, Chinoy published the 1981 collection Women in American Theater, which focused on women such as Cheryl Crawford, Ruth Draper and Susan Glaspell, with a revised edition of the book issued in 2005. She was working on a second book about the Group Theatre before her death.

== Personal life and legacy ==
She was married to the sociologist Ely Chinoy, who died in 1975; they had a daughter and a son.

Chinoy died at age 87 on May 24, 2010, in Turners Falls, Massachusetts, of pneumonia and Alzheimer's disease.

Her final book, The Group Theatre, Passion, Politics, and Performance in the Depression Era, was completed posthumously by colleagues Don Wilmeth and Milly Barrenger and published by Palgrave Macmillan in their Palgrave Studies in Theatre and Performance History series.

The Helen Krich Chinoy Papers, c1923–2010, are held in the Sophia Smith Collection, Smith College.

== Awards and honors ==
She shared an Emmy Award for her work as academic adviser on Broadway's Dreamers: The Legacy of the Group Theatre, a Public Broadcasting System documentary that aired on Masterpiece Theatre in 1989.
