= Flawed (comics) =

Comics series by Chuck Brown

Publication information
- Publisher: Image Comics
- Schedule: Monthly
- Format: Limited series
- Genre: Superhero
- Publication date: September 2022 – April 2023
- No. of issues: 6
- Main character: Gem Ezz

Creative team
- Created by: Chuck Brown
- Written by: Chuck Brown
- Artist: Prenzy
- Letterer: Becca Carey
- Colorist: Prenzy

Flawed is a comics series by Chuck Brown about Gem Ezz, a psychiatrist turned vigilante. It debuted on September 28, 2022. It was well-received by critics for its story, protagonist, and artwork.

== Plot ==
The series is set in the fictional city of Setham, which has a long history of corruption and violence. Gem Ezz, a psychiatrist from Egypt who moved to Setham, counsels patients dealing with trauma and personal injustices. Gem fights against the city's bloodthirsty aristocracy by night as a masked vigilante until she crosses paths with an immortal serial killer who preys on children.

== Development ==
Writer Chuck Brown and artist Prenzy had previously worked together on the series On The Stump. Brown described the premise as "Frasier meets The Punisher", and said that it was inspired by his experience speaking with therapists, his observations of society, and of institutional racism. In addition to the story, the comics include essays written by licensed mental health care professionals.

Issue #1 of Flawed was published on September 28, 2022. Issue #6, the final issue of volume 1, was published on April 5, 2023. A collected edition of volume 1 was published on May 17, 2023.

== Reception ==
Critics praised the series' writing and art, describing it as gory and action-oriented. Its social commentary on the criminal justice system, racial disparities in criminal justice, the glorification of serial killers, and economic inequality.

Megan Peters of ComicBook.com wrote that the series "leans into psychological warfare in a refreshing way. Filled with thick line art and bold colors, Image's new story promises to explore some wild crimes and even wilder psychoses before all is said and done." Sayantan Gayen of CBR.com praised the first issue, writing that "the enthralling premise is enough to keep the reader's attention affixed to the developing situation as the protagonist unleashes hell, taking the entertainment quotient sky-high."

Justin Harrison of AIPT gave the first issue 8.5 out of 10 and wrote that "Brown's scripting and character work match Prenzy's illustrations in quality." Lukke Sweet of Comic Book Dispatch praised the story and artwork, describing the first issue as "an interesting take on justice." Ronnie Gorham wrote that the series, "says a lot about the judicial system, especially cases that affect African Americans", describing the first issue as "filled with real-world scenarios, brutal violence, and a glimpse at how the judicial system fails the poor and people of color."

Several critics commented on the relationship between the narrative and Prenzy's art style, which is described as colorful and curving. Gayantan said, "Uncannily, the stylized lines mellow down much of the intensity and make even eye-piercing knife work look palatable. The ink flows in waves, giving the cityscape a dramatic perspective that puts everything into sharp focus as if the figures are being drawn in by a powerful magnet." Sweet also noted that "The curved linework gives a softness to the issue that was unexpected but worked." Harrison wrote that Prenzy "skillfully combines a keen sense of space with an eye for a wide variety of motion, a gift for gloppy gore, and some careful cartooning."

Critics also singled out the character of Gem Ezz. Russ Bickerstaff of You Don't Read Comics praised the character's confidence and dark personality, writing that "the idea of a vigilante who is a psychiatrist by day is a very clever one for a horror-based urban crime action series." GWW.com wrote that the series explores Gem's flawed approach to justice and the way it parallels the violent mechanisms within Setham's society.
