= Chuck Brown (comics artist) =

American comics artist

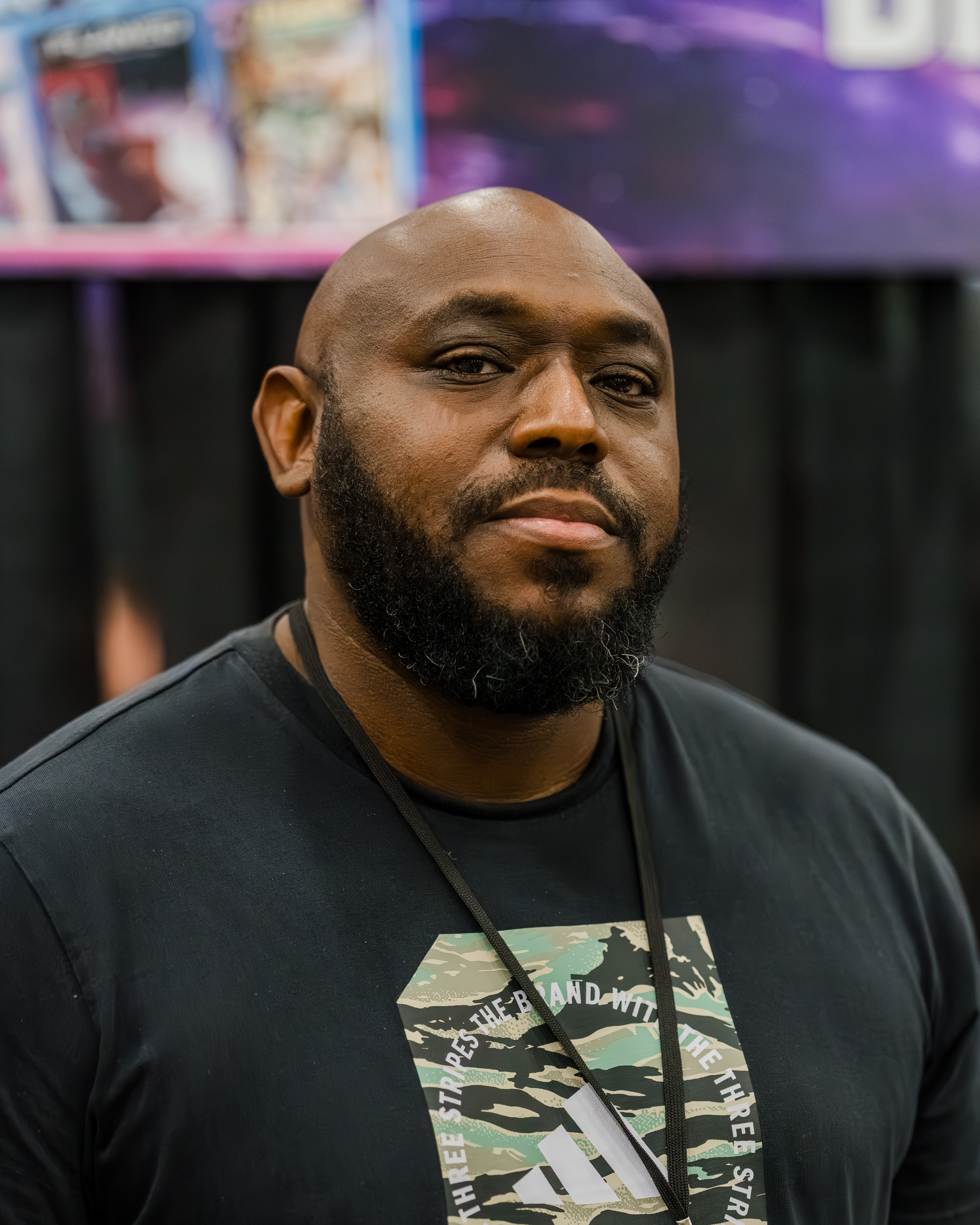
- Brown at GalaxyCon Nashville in 2026
- Areas: Writer, Artist
- Notable works: Flawed; Bitter Root; 1000
- Awards: Two Eisner Awards including: Best Continuing Series (2020 and 2022); Ringo Award

Chuck Brown is an American comics artist known for co-creating the comic book series Bitter Root and Flawed, and the webcomic 1000.

== Biography ==
Brown grew up in Latta, South Carolina. He attended Benedict College, where he created the comic book American Empire with several other students. The series was set in a universe where the United States was a front for an evil empire that controlled the world. After graduating, he began working and eventually had a job in IT at the University of South Carolina.

In 2017, Brown co-created 1000 with Sanford Greene. Brown and Greene had previously worked together creating Dark Horse Comics' Rotten Apple. Brown quit his IT job in 2021, during the COVID-19 pandemic, so that he could become a full-time comics creator.

Brown co-created Bitter Root, a comic book about monster hunters in the Harlem Renaissance, with Sanford Greene and David F. Walker.

He wrote the Image Comics series Flawed, about Gem Ezz, a psychiatrist who moonlights as a vigilante. It debuted on September 28, 2022. Brown has also written runs of Marvel Comics and DC Comics, such as Black Panther, Wolverine, Punisher, Superman, Black Manta and Aquaman.

== Awards and nominations ==
He has received a Ringo Award for Best Series for Bitter Root, and Best Webcomic for 1000. Bitter Root won the Eisner Award for Best Continuing Series in 2020 and 2022. The series was also nominated for the Golden Issue Award, and the Dragon Award.
