= Big Jim and the White Boy =

2024 graphic novel by David F. Walker and Marcus Kwame Anderson

Big Jim and the White Boy: An American Classic Reimagined
- Date: October 15, 2024
- Publisher: Ten Speed Graphic

Creative team
- Writer: David F. Walker
- Artist: Marcus Kwame Anderson
- ISBN: 978-0593836118

Big Jim and the White Boy: An American Classic Reimagined is a graphic novel written by David F. Walker and illustrated by Marcus Kwame Anderson. It is a retelling of Mark Twain's Adventures of Huckleberry Finn, with the character of Jim acting as the protagonist.

== Plot ==
Big Jim and the White Boy reinterprets Twain's original novel from Jim's perspective, as he searches for his enslaved wife and children, with Huckleberry Finn acting as his sidekick. The book continues past the original novel's ending, having the elderly Jim pass his story onto his descendants and following his descendants into the 20th and 21st centuries.

== Reception ==
Rob Salkowitz from Forbes praised Walker and Anderson for "reimagining Huckleberry Finn in a way that expresses Jim’s full humanity and expands the canvas of Twain’s work without losing the scope, flavor and humor of the original" Publishers Weekly and School Library Journal gave the book starred reviews, with Publishers Weekly noting Anderson's "bold and dynamic art style that emphasizes the harrowing and tender aspects in equal measure".

=== Accolades ===
Year	Award/Honor	Result	Ref.
2025	Eisner Award for Best Publication for Teens	Shortlisted	
2025	Ringo Award for Best Original Graphic Novel	Shortlisted	
2025	56th NAACP Image Awards - Outstanding Graphic Novel	Shortlisted	
2025	American Library Association's Great Graphic Novels for Teens	Top Ten	
2025	Alex Awards	Top Ten	

== See also ==
- James (novel), another reimagining of the Adventures of Huckleberry Finn with Jim as the protagonist
