= Bitter Root =

American comics series

- Cover artwork by Sanford Greene and Rico Renzi

Publication information
- Publisher: Image Comics
- Format: Ongoing series
- Publication date: November 2018 – August 2021
- No. of issues: 15
- Main characters: Blink Sangerye; Etta Sangerye; Cullen Sangerye; Berg Sangerye; Ford Sangerye

Creative team
- Created by: Sanford Greene; Chuck Brown; David F. Walker
- Written by: Chuck Brown and David F. Walker
- Artist: Sanford Greene
- Letterer: Clayton Cowles
- Colorist(s): Rico Renzi; Sofie Dodgson

Bitter Root is an American comic book series, co-created by Sanford Greene, Chuck Brown and David F. Walker. Published by Image Comics, the series is set during the Harlem Renaissance and follows the Sangeryes, a family of monster hunters who attempt to cure creatures rather than killing them. The series was a critical and commercial success, and the rights to the film adaptation were acquired by Legendary Pictures.

A spin-off series, Bitter Root: The Next Movement, was released in 2025. This chapter of the saga is set in 1964 during the Civil Rights Movement and features a new generation of the Sangerye family.

== Plot ==
The series is set in 1924 and follows the Sangerye family, legendary monster hunters who have been almost wiped out by an attack prior to the events of the series. The remaining members of the family band together to hunt down monsters which plague the city of New York. Ma Etta Sangerye, the family matriarch, developed methods of curing monsters using her botanical knowledge. The protagonist, Blink Sangerye, chooses to fight monsters rather than practicing potions and medicine as women traditionally do. This causes friction between Blink and Ma Etta, who wants her to conform to tradition.

== Development ==
Brown and Greene initially came up with the idea for a story involving monster hunters in the Harlem Renaissance. They wanted to combine elements of early 20th century African-American culture, voodoo and film noir. They chose the era because they felt the era embodied both "incredible artistic and cultural growth" as well as institutionalized racism, which provided opportunities for conflict. Greene and Brown later brought on Walker to help them develop the idea, including the characters and background of the series as well as its title. Walker had previously collaborated with Greene on Power Man and Iron Fist.

The original run of the series ran from November 2018 to August 2021. In 2025, the series returned with the five-issue miniseries Bitter Root: The Next Movement.

== Reception ==
The series was a commercial success upon release, with a second printing being ordered two days after the first issue's debut. It also received positive reviews from critics. ComicBook.com gave the series' first issue a positive review, praising the series' distinctiveness, characters and handling of complex themes related to hatred, bigotry and violence. Hugh Sheridan of Bleeding Cool described the comic book as a "fun action adventure", praising Greene's "kinetic and distinctive art" as well as the comic's writing.

In 2020, Bitter Root was nominated for the Golden Issue Award for Best Ongoing Series and the Dragon Award for Best Comic Book. That year, it won Best Series at the Ringo Awards. It won the Eisner Award for Best Continuing Series in 2020 and 2022.

== Adaptation ==
The film rights to the series were acquired by Legendary Pictures in March 2019. In October 2019, it was announced that Ryan Coogler, Sev Ohanian and Zinzi Evans would direct the film. In 2021, it was reported that Regina King was attached to the project as director.
