= Nancy Rawles =

American playwright, novelist and teacher

Nancy Rawles is an American playwright, novelist, and teacher. She is a 2006 recipient of the Alex Award.

== Early life and education ==
Rawles grew up in Los Angeles.

Rawles graduated from Northwestern University with a degree in journalism. She studied playwriting in Chicago with Linda Walsh Jenkins and Steven Carter. She later studied with C. Bernard Jackson of the Inner City Cultural Center in Los Angeles, and with Valerie Curtis Newton of The Hansberry Project.

== Career ==
Rawles has written three novels. Her third novel, My Jim, published in 2005, tells the story of Sadie Watson, said to be the wife of the character known as "Nigger Jim", the escaped slave who travels down the Mississippi River with Huckleberry Finn in Mark Twain's famous novel of that name.

Rawles is a contributor to the Female Sexual Ethics Project at Brandeis University under the direction of Bernadette Brooten, Kraft-Hiatt Professor of Christian Studies.

== Awards ==
In 2005, Booklist included My Jim on their list of year's the best "Adult Books for Young Adults".

In 2007, Rawles received an Artist Trust Fellowship in Fiction.

Awards for Rawles's writing
| Year | Work | Award | Result | Ref. |
|---|---|---|---|---|
| 2009 | My Jim | Seattle Reads | | |
| 1998 | Love Like Gumbo | American Book Award | Winner | |
| 1998 | | Washington State Governor's Writers Award | | |
| 2000 | | Astraea Foundation, Claire of the Moon Award for Fiction | | |
| 2006 | My Jim | Alex Awards | Winner | |
| 2006 | My Jim | Hurston/Wright Legacy Award in Fiction | Winner | |

== Works ==
=== Novels ===
- Love Like Gumbo. Fjord Press. 1997. ISBN 978-0-940242-75-3.
- Crawfish Dreams. Random House, Inc. 2003. ISBN 978-0-385-50418-8.
- My Jim. Crown Publishers. 2005. ISBN 978-1-4000-5400-8.

=== Criticism ===
- Rawles, Nancy (July 10, 2005). "Chains of Madness". The Washington Post.
