= Sanford Greene =

American comics artist

- Born: 1 January 1972; Greeleyville
- Education: Benedict College
- Occupations: Penciller, illustrator
- Notable work: 1000, Bitter Root
- Awards: Eisner Award for Best Continuing Series (Bitter Root, 2020); Ringo Award for Best Artist or Penciller (2020); Ringo Award for Best Webcomic (1000, 2018); Eisner Award for Best Continuing Series (Bitter Root, 2022)

Sanford Greene is an American comics artist. He has worked for publishers like Marvel, Dark Horse, Image and DC Comics. He created the webcomic 1000 (written by Chuck Brown) and Bitter Root (co-written by Brown and David F. Walker). Greene is a two-time Eisner and Ringo Awards. winner for his work on Bitter Root.

== Early Life ==
Born in Greelyville, SC in 1972, Greene was inspired by comics from a young age. Somewhere between ages 8 and 9, Greene noticed a spinner rack of comics at the store, and had convinced his mother to buy him some. Ever since, he began to derive inspiration from the medium and decided that he would one day become an illustrator himself.

Greene is an alumnus of Benedict College, and graduated in the year 2000 with a BFA in Studio Art. He then went on to work as an illustrator and concept artist for Marvel, Disney, and Warner Brothers, as well as become the co-creator of Bitter Root in the mid 2010s, alongside Chuck Brown and David F. Walker.
