= Linda Walsh Jenkins =

American historian

- Born: El Paso, Texas, U.S.
- Education: Rice University, University of Minnesota
- Occupations: Author, academic
- Writing career
- Notable work: Women in American Theatre

Linda Walsh Jenkins is an American academic and author, active in the field of theatre studies, particularly with regard to Native American and women's theatre.

== Biography ==
Linda Walsh Jenkins was born in El Paso. She studied English at Rice University and gained her PhD from the University of Minnesota, in the field of theatre. Her academic career was at the theatre faculty of Northwestern University (1976–89), where she was a tenured professor and chaired the doctorate program in theatre and drama. She taught playwriting for many years, with notable students including John Logan and Bruce Norris. During the 1970s and 1980s, she participated in the women's theatre community. In 1984, she was one of the founders of the Chicago New Plays Festival Company, with Sally Nemeth and Steve Scott. Her papers from 1975–87 are archived by the Sophia Smith Collection of Women's History at Smith College. After leaving academia, she worked in Los Angeles in television/film production.

== Research and writings ==
Her 1975 dissertation, "The Performances of Native Americans as American Theatre: Reconnaissance and Recommendations" (at the University of Minnesota) is considered an influential early work in the study of Native American theatre. In a 1984 article published in Women in Performance, she made the case for "authentically female" drama. Her 1985 essay, with Susan Ogden-Malouf, "The (Female) Actor Prepares", is described by Rosemary Malague in a 2013 book as a "provocative" work in feminist theatre critique. Lesley Ferris describes the essay as "significant" and comments that it highlights two issues that Malague further develops, "the way in which a vulnerable young actor is exposed to a guru-like teacher or director" and the way in which this figure forces the female actor "to relinquish her autonomy to potential exploitation, both sexual and psychological."

Jenkins co-authored and co-edited three editions of the anthology Women in American Theatre, with Helen Krich Chinoy, initially published by Crown Publishing in 1981, with later expanded and revised editions being published by Theatre Communications Group. Women in American Theatre is made up of short pieces on different topics relating to women working in the theater in the United States. It was the earliest comprehensive review of women's work in American theatre. Editions of the book were widely reviewed. (Note: For example: 1981 edition: 1988 edition: 2006 edition:) The Daily Spectrum wrote "Chinoy and Jenkins have chosen essays which very adequately portray the pioneering accomplishments of many women, both well known and little known." Bonnie Marranca, in a review of the first edition for Performing Arts Journal, praises the book for its "uncovering of the women from outside our own times" but finds the scope too historical, criticizing, for example, the paucity of interviews with contemporary women active in theatre, as well as the omission of 19th-century actress–managers, choreographers, photographers or media agents. Karen Laughlin, in a review of the second edition for the journal Modern Drama, called the publication of the first edition a "significant event for theatre historians", and described contributions in the second edition as "important in framing issues of significance for the study of women and theatre, in bringing neglected work to light, and in thereby suggesting avenues for further research." The second edition of the book was selected as "Editors' Choice: Books We Recommend" by the academic journal TDR in 1988.

In 1975, Jenkins edited two volumes of scripts from largely improvised plays performed at the Children's Theatre of Minneapolis, directed by John Clark Donahue: The Cookie Jar and Other Plays, and Five Plays from the Children's Theatre, published by University of Minnesota Press. In a review for Library Journal, Sarah Chokla Gross recommended the plays to stimulate creativity for adults as well as children.

In 2017, Jenkins published The 90-Day Play: The Process and Principles of Playwriting, a text about how to write a first draft, structured into a series of daily tasks, with examples from a large number of published plays. Terry McCabe describes it as "excellent" and praises Jenkins' "warm, nurturing style".

== Publications ==
- The 90-Day Play: The Process and Principles of Playwriting (90-Day Novel Press; 2017)
- Women in American Theatre, edited with Helen Krich Chinoy (3 editions)
- The Cookie Jar and Other Plays, edited (University of Minnesota Press; 1975)
- Five Plays from the Children's Theatre, edited (University of Minnesota Press; 1975)
