= Adventures of Huckleberry Finn =

1885 novel by Mark Twain

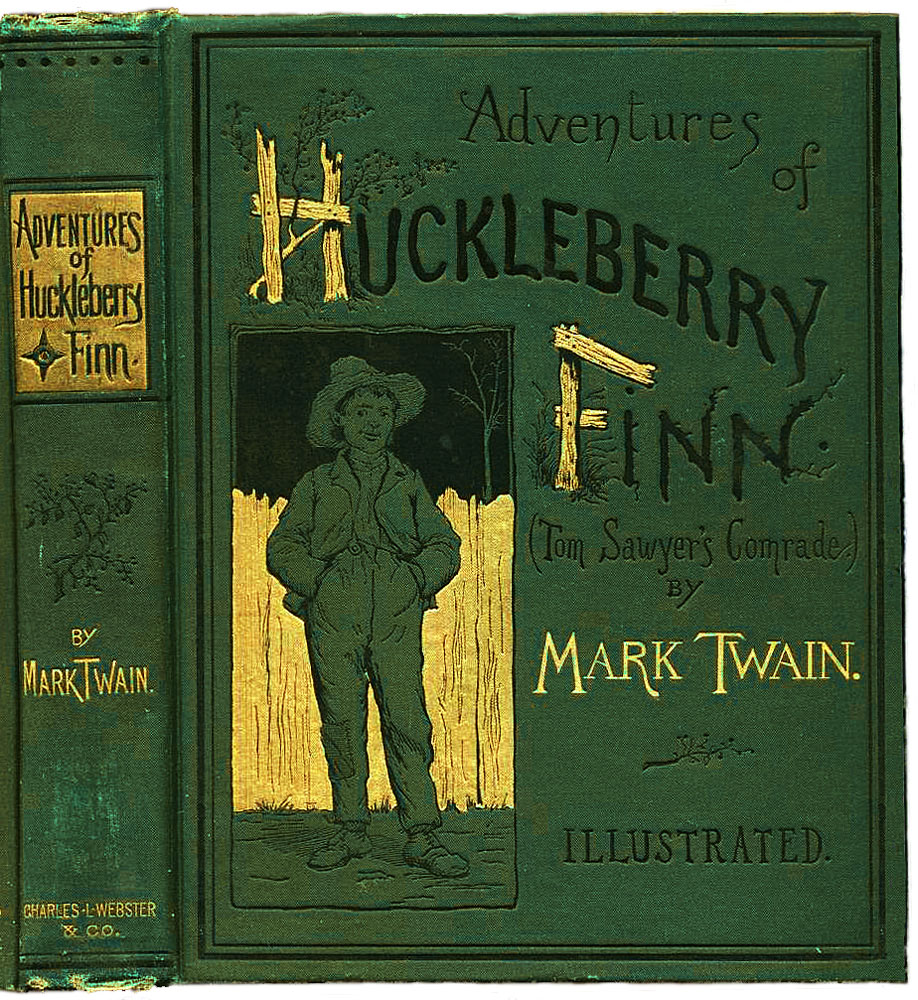
- 2nd (1st US) edition book cover
- Author: Mark Twain
- Illustrator: E. W. Kemble
- Language: English
- Series: Tom Sawyer
- Genre: Picaresque novel, children's novel
- Publisher: Chatto & Windus / Charles L. Webster And Company.
- Publication date: December 10, 1884 (UK and Canada); February 18, 1885 (United States)
- Publication place: United States
- Pages: 362
- OCLC: 29489461
- Preceded by: The Adventures of Tom Sawyer
- Followed by: Tom Sawyer Abroad
- Text: Adventures of Huckleberry Finn at Wikisource

Adventures of Huckleberry Finn is a picaresque novel by American author Mark Twain that was first published in the United Kingdom in December 1884 and in the United States in February 1885. It is commonly named among the Great American Novels, and it is among the first in major American literature to be written throughout in vernacular English, characterized by local color regionalism. Being the direct sequel to The Adventures of Tom Sawyer, it is told in the first person by Huckleberry "Huck" Finn, the narrator of two other later Twain novels (Tom Sawyer Abroad and Tom Sawyer, Detective) and a friend of Tom Sawyer.

The book is noted for "changing the course of children's literature" in the United States for the "deeply felt portrayal of boyhood". It is also known for its colorful description of people and places along the Mississippi River. Set in a Southern antebellum society that had ceased to exist over 20 years before the work was published, Adventures of Huckleberry Finn is an often scathing satire on entrenched attitudes, particularly racism.

Perennially popular with readers, Adventures of Huckleberry Finn has also been the continued object of study by literary critics since its publication. The book was widely criticized upon release because of its extensive use of coarse language and racial epithets. Throughout the 20th century, and despite arguments that the protagonist and the tenor of the book are anti-racist, criticism of the book continued due to both its perceived use of racial stereotypes and its frequent use of the racial slur "nigger".

== Plot ==
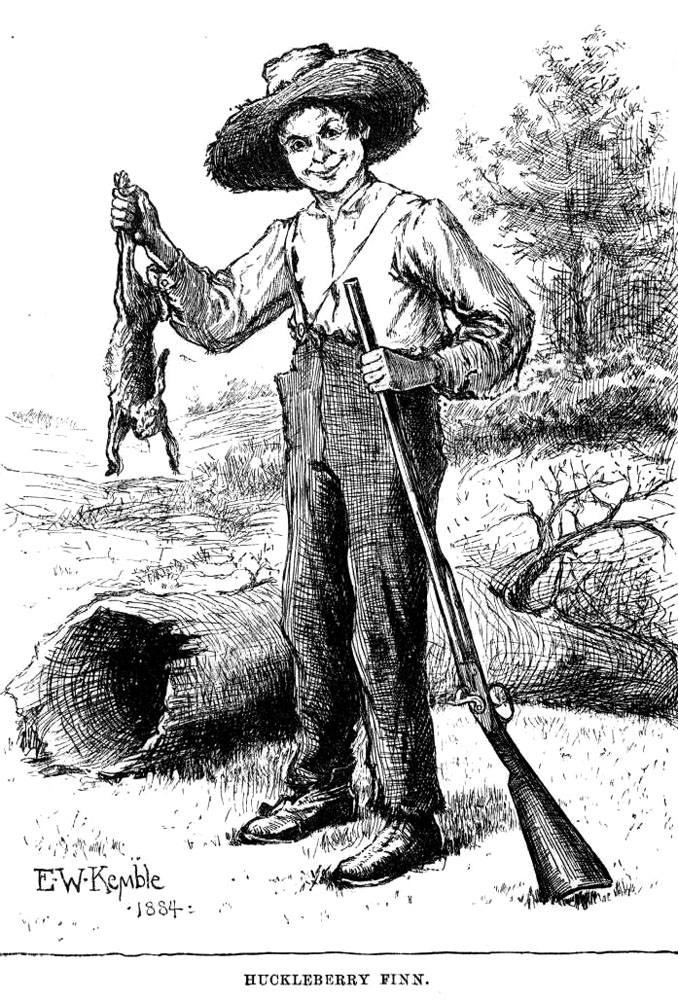
Huckleberry Finn, as depicted by E. W. Kemble in the original 1884 edition of the book

In 1840s St. Petersburg, Missouri, Huckleberry Finn has received a considerable sum from the treasure discovered in The Adventures of Tom Sawyer, and the Widow Douglas and her sister Miss Watson become his guardians. Despite preferring life as an errant boy, Huck stays so he can be part of Tom Sawyer's gang. Huck's father, "Pap", an abusive alcoholic, tries to appropriate Huck's fortune. When this fails, Pap imprisons him in a remote cabin.

After a delirium tremens crisis in which Pap tries to kill Huck, Huck fakes his own murder and settles on Jackson's Island, where he reunites with Miss Watson's slave Jim, who ran away after overhearing she was planning to sell him. Huck and Jim decide to go down the Mississippi River to Cairo, in the free state of Illinois. After a flood, they find a timber raft and a house floating downstream. Inside the house, Jim finds a man who was shot to death, but prevents Huck from seeing. Huck sneaks into town disguised as a girl, where he discovers from Judith Loftus that there is a reward for Jim's capture and Jim is suspected of killing Huck. They flee on their raft.

Huck and Jim come across a grounded steamboat on which two thieves discuss murdering a third. Finding their raft has drifted away, they flee in the thieves' boat. They find their raft and sink the thieves' boat, then Huck tricks a night watchman into a rescue attempt, which fails when the steamboat sinks. Huck and Jim are separated in a fog. When they reunite, Huck tricks Jim into thinking he dreamed it. Jim is disappointed when Huck admits the truth. Huck is surprised by Jim's strong feelings and apologizes.

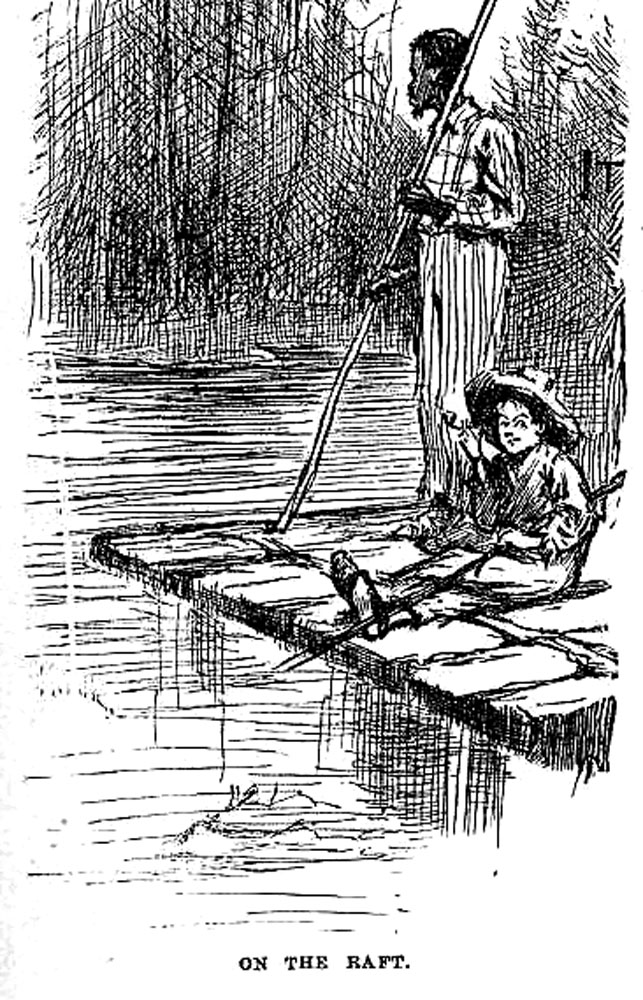
Jim and Huck on their raft, by E. W. Kemble

Huck is conflicted about supporting a runaway slave, but when two white men seeking runaways come upon the raft, his lies succeed in convincing them to leave. Jim and Huck realize they have passed Cairo. With no way to go upriver, they decide to continue downriver. The raft is struck by a passing steamship, again separating them. On the riverbank, Huck meets the Grangerfords, who are engaged in a 30-year feud with the Shepherdsons. After a Grangerford daughter elopes with a Shepherdson boy, all the Grangerford men are killed in a Shepherdson ambush. Huck escapes and reunites with Jim, who has found and repaired the raft.

Jim and Huck are joined by two confidence men claiming to be a King and a Duke, and they rope Huck and Jim into aiding in several scams. In one town, the King and the Duke cheat the townsfolk over two nights with a short, overpriced stage performance. On the third, the grifters collect the admission fee from previous audience members bent on revenge, then flee. In the next town, the swindlers impersonate the brothers of the recently deceased Peter Wilks and attempt to steal his estate. Huck tries to retrieve the money for Wilks's orphaned nieces. Two other men claiming to be Wilks's brothers arrive, causing an uproar. Huck flees but is caught by the King and the Duke. He escapes but finds they have sold Jim to the Phelpses. Huck vows to free Jim, despite believing he will go to hell for it.

The Phelpses mistake Huck for their nephew Tom, who is expected to visit, and Huck plays along. Their nephew is Tom Sawyer; when he arrives, he pretends to be his half-brother Sid and develops a theatrical plan to free Jim. Huck attempts to warn the King and the Duke that Jim alerted local residents to their scam but sees them tarred and feathered and being run out of town on a rail.

Tom is wounded during Jim's escape. Instead of fleeing, Jim stays to tend to him and is arrested and returned to the Phelpses. Tom's Aunt Polly arrives and reveals Huck's and Tom's true identities. She informs the group that Miss Watson has died and that she freed Jim in her will. Tom admits he knew but wanted to "rescue" Jim in style. Jim tells Huck that Pap was the dead man in the floating house. Huck declares he will flee to Indian Territory to escape adoption by the Phelpses.

== Characters ==
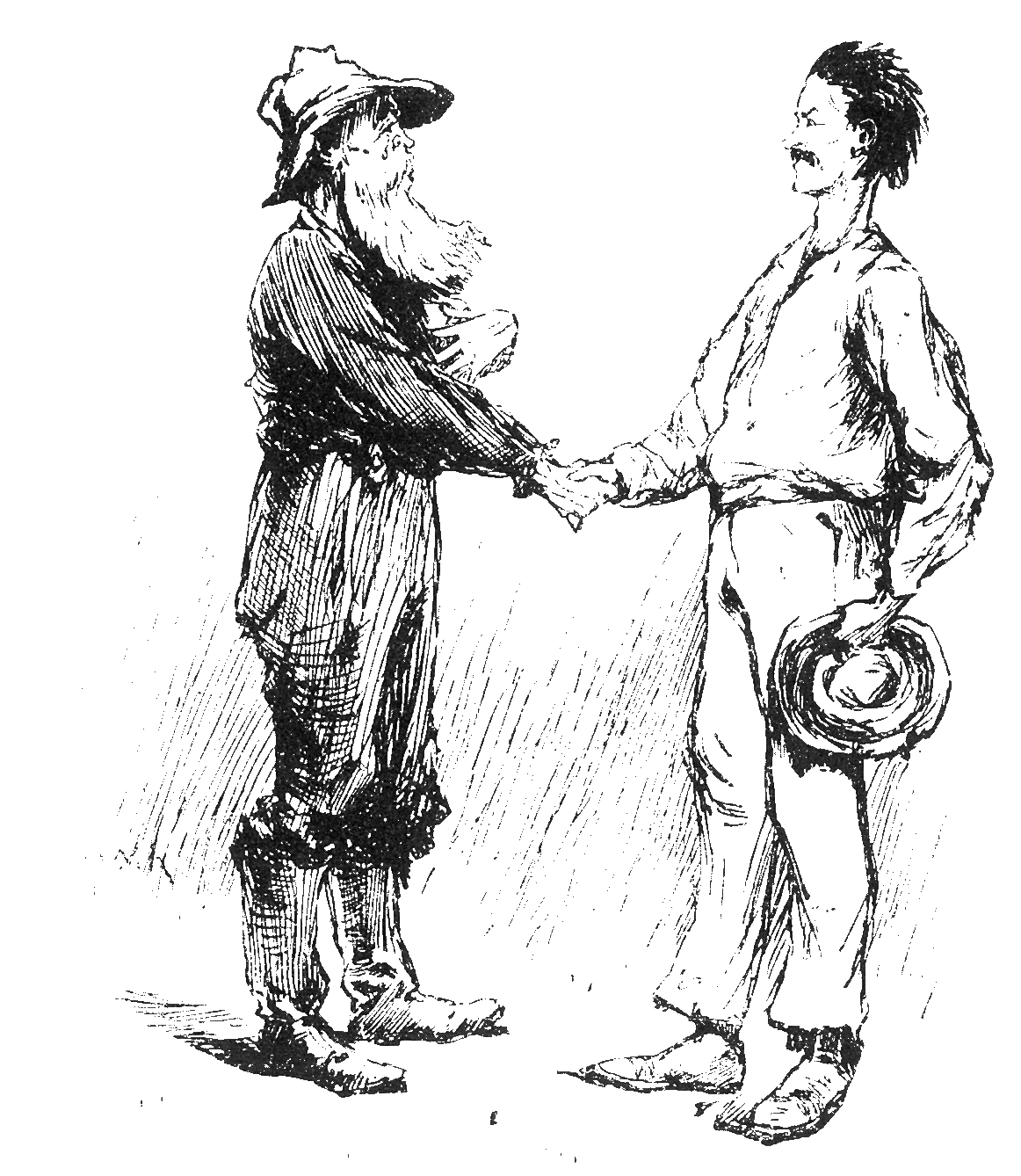
The "King" and the "Duke", by E. W. Kemble

In order of appearance:

- Huckleberry Finn, "Huck" to his friends, is a boy about "thirteen or fourteen or along there" years old (Chapter 17). He has been brought up by his father, the town drunk, and has a difficult time fitting into society. Huck's good nature offers a contrast to the inadequacies and inequalities in society.
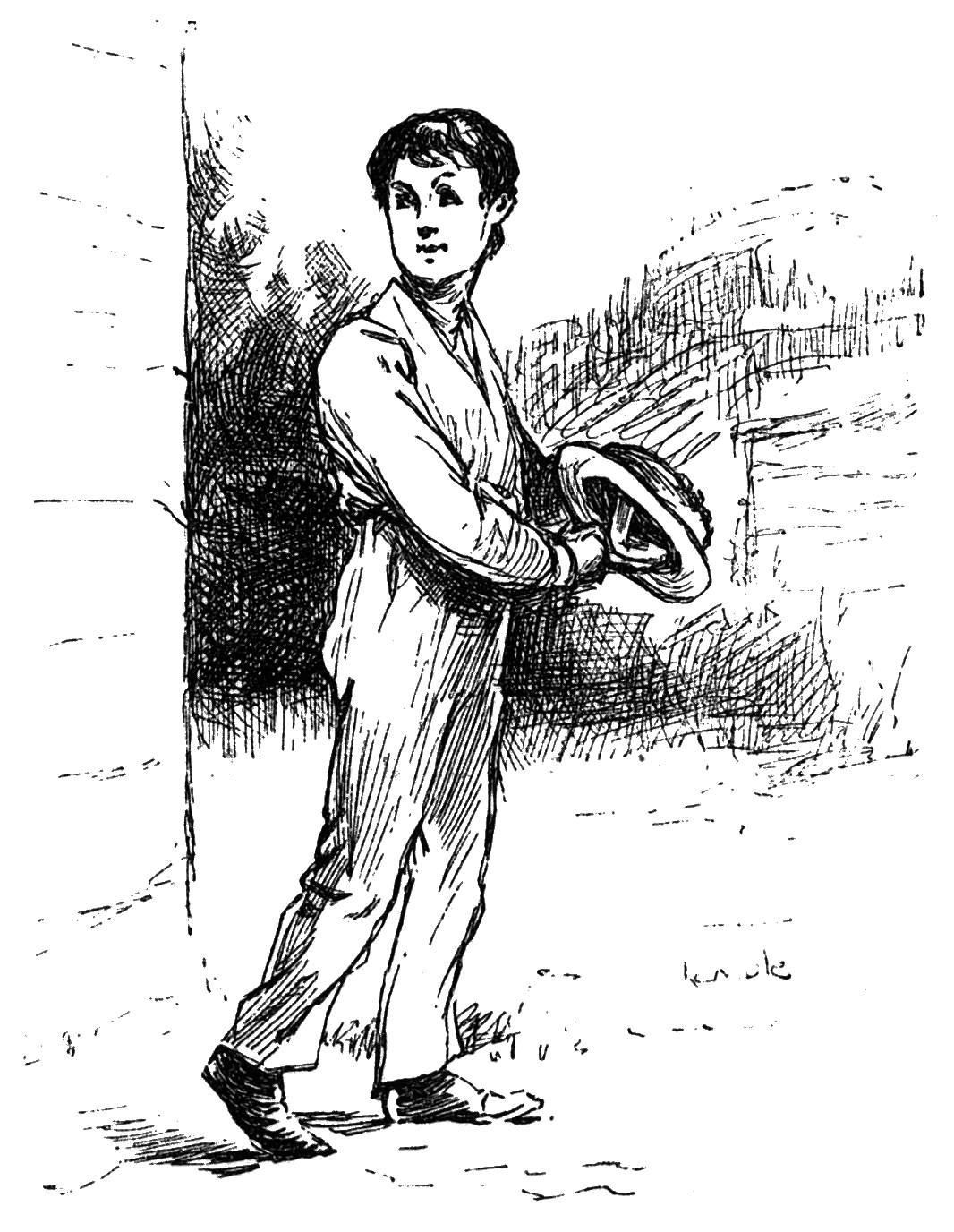
  Tom Sawyer stealing spoons on the Phelpses' farm
- Tom Sawyer is Huck's best friend and peer, the main character of other Twain novels and the leader of the town boys in adventures. He is mischievous, good-hearted, and "the best fighter and the smartest kid in town".
- Widow Douglas is the woman who takes Huck in after he helps save her from a violent home invasion. She tries her best to "sivilize" (civilize) Huck, believing it is her Christian duty to do so.
- Miss Watson is the widow's sister, a tough old spinster who also lives with them. She is fairly hard on Huck, causing him to resent her a good deal. Mark Twain may have drawn inspiration for this character from several people he knew in his life.
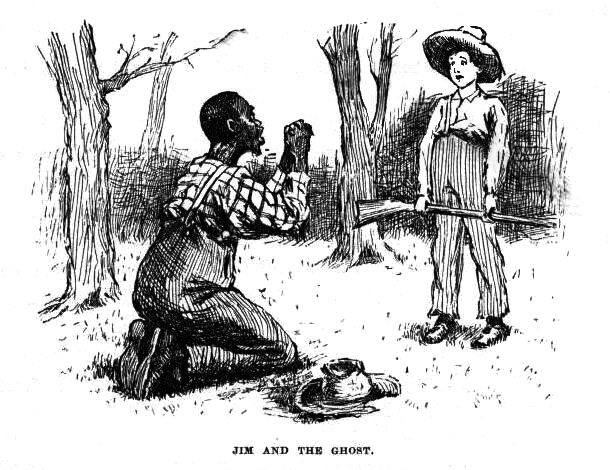
  In this scene illustrated by E. W. Kemble, Jim has given Huck up for dead and when he reappears thinks he must be a ghost.
- Jim is Miss Watson's physically large but mild-mannered slave. Huck becomes very close to Jim when they reunite after Jim flees Miss Watson's household to seek refuge from slavery, and Huck and Jim become fellow travelers on the Mississippi River. Jim is shown to be honorable, perceptive, and intelligent, despite his lack of education and the prejudice he faces.
- "Pap" Finn is Huck's father, a brutal alcoholic drifter. He resents Huck getting any kind of education. His only genuine interest in his son involves begging or extorting money to feed his alcohol addiction.
- Judith Loftus plays a small part in the novel—as the kind and perceptive woman whom Huck talks to in order to find out about the search for Jim—but many critics believe her to be the best drawn female character in the novel.
- The Grangerfords, an aristocratic Kentuckian family headed by the sexagenarian Colonel Saul Grangerford, take Huck in after he is separated from Jim on the Mississippi. Huck becomes close friends with the youngest male of the family, Buck Grangerford, who is Huck's age. By the time Huck meets them, the Grangerfords have been engaged in an age-old blood feud with another local family, the Shepherdsons.
- The Duke and the King are two otherwise unnamed con artists whom Huck and Jim take aboard their raft just before the start of their Arkansas adventures. They pose as the long-lost Duke of Bridgewater and the long dead Lost Dauphin of France in an attempt to over-awe Huck and Jim, who quickly recognize their con but pretend to accept their claims to avoid conflict.
- Doctor Robinson is the only one who recognizes the King and Duke are phonies when they pretend to be the British brothers of Peter Wilks. He warns the townspeople, but they ignore him.
- Mary Jane, Joanna, and Susan Wilks are the three young nieces of their wealthy guardian, Peter Wilks, who has recently died. The Duke and the King try to steal their inheritance by posing as Peter's estranged brothers from England but are eventually thwarted.
- Aunt Sally and Uncle Silas Phelps buy Jim from the Duke and the King. She is a loving, high-strung "farmer's wife", and he a plodding old man, both a farmer and a preacher.

== Themes ==
Adventures of Huckleberry Finn explores themes of race and identity; what it means to be free and civilized; and the ideas of humanity and social responsibility in the changing landscape of America. A complexity exists concerning Jim's character. While some scholars point out that Jim is good-hearted and moral, and he is not unintelligent (in contrast to several of the more negatively depicted white characters), others have criticized the novel as racist, citing the use of the word "nigger" and emphasizing the stereotypically "comic" treatment of Jim's lack of education, superstition and ignorance. This argument is supported by incidents early in the novel where Huck deliberately "tricks" Jim, taking advantage of his gullibility and Jim still remains loyal to him.

But this novel is also Huck's 'coming of age' story where he overcomes his initial biases and forms a deeper bond with Jim. Throughout the story, Huck is in moral conflict with the received values of the society in which he lives. Huck is unable consciously to rebut those values even in his thoughts, but he makes a moral choice based on his own valuation of Jim's friendship and human worth, a decision in direct opposition to the things he has been taught. Twain, in his lecture notes, proposes that "a sound heart is a surer guide than an ill-trained conscience" and goes on to describe the novel as "a book of mine where a sound heart and a deformed conscience come into collision and conscience suffers defeat".

To highlight the hypocrisy required to condone slavery within an ostensibly moral system, Twain has Huck's father enslave his son, isolate him and beat him. When Huck escapes, he immediately encounters Jim "illegally" doing the same thing. The treatments both of them receive are radically different, especially in an encounter with Mrs. Judith Loftus. She takes pity on Huck, whom she presumes to be a runaway apprentice, yet boasts about her husband sending the hounds after Jim, a runaway slave.

Some scholars discuss Huck's own character, and the novel itself, in the context of its relation to African-American culture as a whole. John Alberti quotes Shelley Fisher Fishkin, who writes in her 1990s book Was Huck Black?: Mark Twain and African-American Voices, "by limiting their field of inquiry to the periphery, [white scholars] have missed the ways in which African-American voices shaped Twain's creative imagination at its core". It is suggested that the character of Huckleberry Finn illustrates the correlation, and even interrelatedness, between white and Black culture in the United States.

== Illustrations ==
The original illustrations were done by E. W. Kemble, at the time a young artist working for Life magazine. Kemble was hand-picked by Twain, who admired his work. Hearn suggests that Twain and Kemble had a similar skill, writing that:

Whatever he may have lacked in technical grace ... Kemble shared with the greatest illustrators the ability to give even the minor individual in a text his own distinct visual personality; just as Twain so deftly defined a full-rounded character in a few phrases, so too did Kemble depict with a few strokes of his pen that same entire personage.

As Kemble could afford only one model, most of his illustrations produced for the book were done by guesswork. When the novel was published, the illustrations were praised even as the novel was harshly criticized. E.W. Kemble produced another set of illustrations for Harper's and the American Publishing Company in 1898 and 1899 after Twain lost the copyright.

== Publication ==
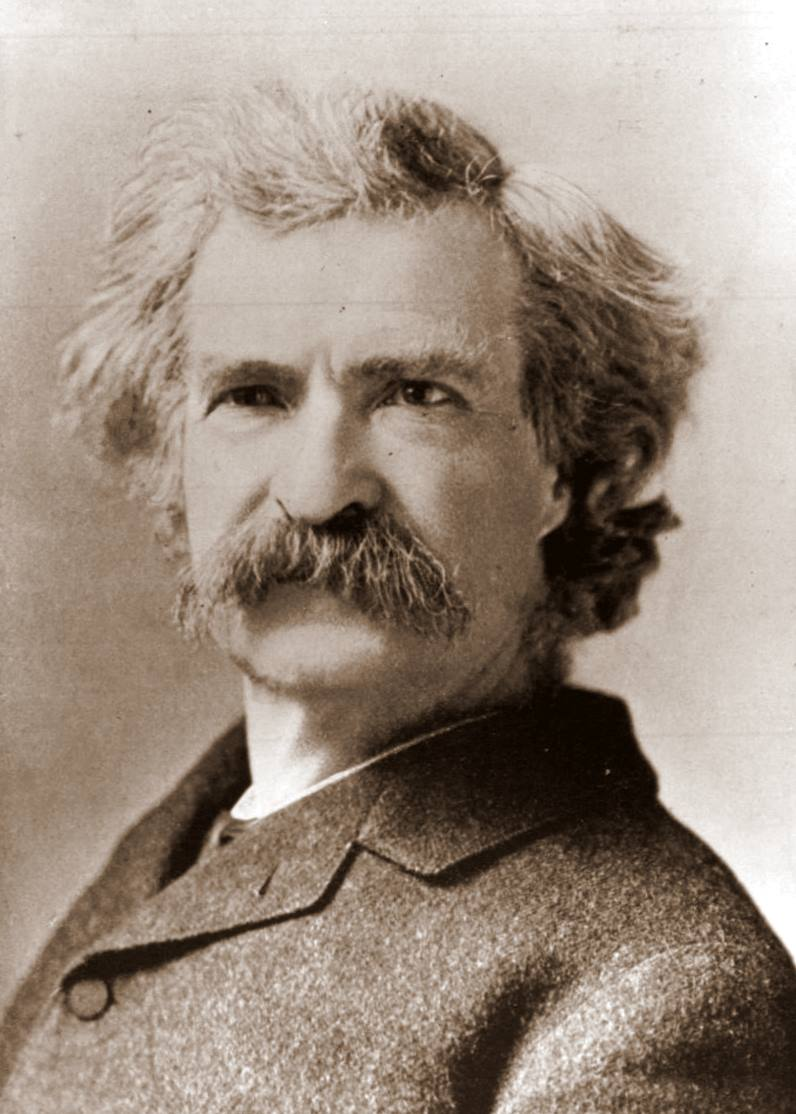
Mark Twain in 1884

Twain initially conceived of the work as a sequel to The Adventures of Tom Sawyer that would follow Huckleberry Finn through adulthood. Beginning with a few pages he had removed from the earlier novel, Twain began work on a manuscript he originally titled Huckleberry Finn's Autobiography. Twain worked on the manuscript off and on for the next several years, ultimately abandoning his original plan of following Huck's development into adulthood. He appeared to have lost interest in the manuscript while it was in progress and set it aside for several years. After making a trip down the Hudson River, Twain returned to his work on the novel. Upon completion, the novel's title closely paralleled its predecessor's: Adventures of Huckleberry Finn (Tom Sawyer's Comrade).

Mark Twain composed the story in pen on notepaper between 1876 and 1883. Paul Needham, who supervised the authentication of the manuscript for Sotheby's books and manuscripts department in New York in 1991, stated, "What you see is [Clemens'] attempt to move away from pure literary writing to dialect writing". For example, Twain revised the opening line of Huck Finn three times. He initially wrote, "You will not know about me", which he changed to, "You do not know about me", before settling on the final version, "You don't know about me, without you have read a book by the name of 'The Adventures of Tom Sawyer'; but that ain't no matter." The revisions also show how Twain reworked his material to strengthen the characters of Huck and Jim, as well as his sensitivity to the then-current debate over literacy and voting. A later version was the first typewritten manuscript delivered to a printer.

Demand for the book spread outside of the United States. Adventures of Huckleberry Finn was eventually published on December 10, 1884, in Canada and the United Kingdom, and on February 18, 1885, in the United States. The illustration on page 283 became a point of issue after an engraver, whose identity was never discovered, made a last-minute addition to the printing plate of Kemble's picture of old Silas Phelps, which drew attention to Phelps' groin. Thirty thousand copies of the book had been printed before the obscenity was discovered. A new plate was made to correct the illustration and repair the existing copies.

In 1885, the Buffalo Public Library's curator, James Fraser Gluck, approached Twain to donate the manuscript to the library. Twain did so. Later it was believed that half of the pages had been misplaced by the printer. In 1991, the missing first half turned up in a steamer trunk owned by descendants of Gluck's. The library successfully claimed possession and, in 1994, opened the Mark Twain Room to showcase the treasure.

In relation to the literary climate at the time of the book's publication in 1885, Henry Nash Smith describes the importance of Mark Twain's already established reputation as a "professional humorist", having already published over a dozen other works. Smith suggests that while the "dismantling of the decadent Romanticism of the later nineteenth century was a necessary operation", Adventures of Huckleberry Finn illustrated "previously inaccessible resources of imaginative power, but also made vernacular language, with its new sources of pleasure and new energy, available for American prose and poetry in the twentieth century".

== Critical reception and banning ==
While it is clear that Adventures of Huckleberry Finn was controversial from the outset, Norman Mailer, writing in The New York Times in 1984, concluded that Twain's novel was not initially "too unpleasantly regarded". In fact, Mailer writes: "the critical climate could hardly anticipate T. S. Eliot and Ernest Hemingway's encomiums 50 years later", reviews that would remain longstanding in the American consciousness.

Alberti suggests that the academic establishment responded to the book's challenges both dismissively and with confusion. During Twain's time and today, defenders of Adventures of Huckleberry Finn "lump all nonacademic critics of the book together as extremists and 'censors', thus equating the complaints about the book's 'coarseness' from the genteel bourgeois trustees of the Concord Public Library in the 1880s with more recent objections based on race and civil rights".

Upon issue of the American edition in 1885, several libraries banned it from their shelves. The early criticism focused on what was perceived as the book's crudeness. One incident was recounted in the newspaper the Boston Transcript:

The Concord (Mass.) Public Library committee has decided to exclude Mark Twain's latest book from the library. One member of the committee says that, while he does not wish to call it immoral, he thinks it contains but little humor, and that of a very coarse type. He regards it as the veriest trash. The library and the other members of the committee entertain similar views, characterizing it as rough, coarse, and inelegant, dealing with a series of experiences not elevating, the whole book being more suited to the slums than to intelligent, respectable people.

Writer Louisa May Alcott criticized the book's publication as well, saying that if Twain "[could not] think of something better to tell our pure-minded lads and lasses he had best stop writing for them".

In 1905, New York's Brooklyn Public Library also banned the book due to "bad word choice" and Huck's having "not only itched but scratched" within the novel, which was considered obscene. When asked by a Brooklyn librarian about the situation, Twain sardonically replied:

I am greatly troubled by what you say. I wrote 'Tom Sawyer' & 'Huck Finn' for adults exclusively, & it always distressed me when I find that boys and girls have been allowed access to them. The mind that becomes soiled in youth can never again be washed clean. I know this by my own experience, & to this day I cherish an unappeased bitterness against the unfaithful guardians of my young life, who not only permitted but compelled me to read an unexpurgated Bible through before I was 15 years old. None can do that and ever draw a clean sweet breath again on this side of the grave.

Many subsequent critics, Ernest Hemingway among them, have deprecated the final chapters, claiming the book "devolves into little more than minstrel-show satire and broad comedy" after Jim is detained. Although Hemingway declared, "All modern American literature comes from" Huck Finn, and hailed it as "the best book we've had", he cautioned, "If you must read it you must stop where the Nigger Jim is stolen from the boys. That is the real end. The rest is just cheating." The African-American writer Ralph Ellison argued that "Hemingway completely missed the structural, symbolic and moral necessity for that part of the plot in which the boys rescue Jim. Yet it is precisely this part which gives the novel its significance." Pulitzer Prize winner Ron Powers states in his Twain biography (Mark Twain: A Life) that "Huckleberry Finn endures as a consensus masterpiece despite these final chapters", in which Tom Sawyer leads Huck through elaborate machinations to rescue Jim.

=== Controversy ===
In his introduction to The Annotated Huckleberry Finn, Michael Patrick Hearn writes that Twain "could be uninhibitedly vulgar", and quotes critic William Dean Howells, a Twain contemporary, who wrote that the author's "humor was not for most women". However, Hearn continues by explaining that "the reticent Howells found nothing in the proofs of Huckleberry Finn so offensive that it needed to be struck out".

==== Racial stereotyping ====
Much of modern scholarship of Huckleberry Finn has focused on its treatment of race. Many Twain scholars have argued that the book, by humanizing Jim and exposing the fallacies of the racist assumptions of slavery, is an attack on racism. Others have argued that the book falls short on this score, especially in its depiction of Jim. According to Professor Stephen Railton of the University of Virginia, Twain was unable to fully rise above the stereotypes of Black people that white readers of his era expected and enjoyed, and, therefore, resorted to minstrel show-style comedy to provide humor at Jim's expense, and ended up confirming rather than challenging late 19th-century racist stereotypes.

In one instance, the controversy caused a drastically altered interpretation of the text: in 1955, CBS tried to avoid controversial material in a televised version of the book, by deleting all mention of slavery and omitting the character of Jim entirely.

==== Use of the word "nigger" ====
Because of this controversy over whether Huckleberry Finn is racist or anti-racist, and because the word "nigger" is frequently used in the novel (a commonly used word in Twain's time that has since become vulgar and taboo), many have questioned the appropriateness of teaching the book in the U.S. public school system—this questioning of the word "nigger" is illustrated by a school administrator of Virginia in 1982 calling the novel the "most grotesque example of racism I've ever seen in my life". According to the American Library Association, Huckleberry Finn was the fifth-most frequently challenged book in the United States during the 1990s.

There have been several more recent cases involving protests for the banning of the novel. In 2003, high school student Calista Phair and her grandmother, Beatrice Clark, in Renton, Washington, proposed banning the book from classroom learning in the Renton School District, though not from any public libraries, because of the word "nigger". The two curriculum committees that considered her request eventually decided to keep the novel on the 11th grade curriculum, though they suspended it until a panel had time to review the novel and set a specific teaching procedure for the novel's controversial topics.

In 2009, a white Washington state high school teacher, John Foley, called for replacing Adventures of Huckleberry Finn with a more modern novel. In an opinion column that Foley wrote in the Seattle Post Intelligencer, he states that all "novels that use the 'N-word' repeatedly need to go". He states that teaching the novel is not only unnecessary, but difficult due to the offensive language within the novel with many students becoming uncomfortable at "just hear[ing] the N-word".

In 2016, Adventures of Huckleberry Finn was removed from a public school district in Virginia, along with the novel To Kill a Mockingbird, due to their use of racial slurs.

==== Expurgated editions ====
Publishers have made their own attempts at easing the controversy by way of releasing editions of the book with the word "nigger" replaced with less controversial words. A 2011 edition of the book, published by NewSouth Books, employed the word "slave" (although the word is not properly applied to a freed man). Their argument for making the change was to offer the reader a choice of reading a "sanitized" version if they were not comfortable with the original. Mark Twain scholar Alan Gribben said he hoped the edition would be more friendly for use in classrooms, rather than have the work banned outright from classroom reading lists due to its language.

According to publisher Suzanne La Rosa, "At NewSouth, we saw the value in an edition that would help the works find new readers. If the publication sparks good debate about how language impacts learning or about the nature of censorship or the way in which racial slurs exercise their baneful influence, then our mission in publishing this new edition of Twain's works will be more emphatically fulfilled." Another scholar, Thomas Wortham, criticized the changes, saying the new edition "doesn't challenge children to ask, 'Why would a child like Huck use such reprehensible language?'"

== Adaptations ==
=== Film ===
- Huck and Tom (1918 silent) by Famous Players–Lasky; directed by William Desmond Taylor; starring Jack Pickford as Tom, Robert Gordon as Huck and Clara Horton as Becky
- Huckleberry Finn (1920 silent) by Famous Players–Lasky; directed by William Desmond Taylor; starring Lewis Sargent as Huck, Gordon Griffith as Tom and Thelma Salter as Becky
- Huckleberry Finn (1931) by Paramount Pictures; directed by Norman Taurog; starring Jackie Coogan as Tom, Junior Durkin as Huck, and Mitzi Green as Becky
- The Adventures of Huckleberry Finn (1939) by MGM; directed by Richard Thorpe; starring Mickey Rooney as Huck
- The Adventures of Huckleberry Finn (1960), directed by Michael Curtiz, starring Eddie Hodges and Archie Moore
- Hopelessly Lost (1973), a Soviet film
- Huckleberry Finn (1975), an ABC movie of the week with Ron Howard as Huck Finn
- The Adventures of Con Sawyer and Hucklemary Finn (1985), an ABC movie of the week with Drew Barrymore as Con Sawyer
- The Adventures of Huck Finn (1993), starring Elijah Wood and Courtney B. Vance
- Tom and Huck (1995), starring Jonathan Taylor Thomas as Tom and Brad Renfro as Huck
- Tomato Sawyer and Huckleberry Larry's Big River Rescue (2008), a VeggieTales parody
- The Adventures of Huck Finn (2012), a German film starring Leon Seidel and directed by Hermine Huntgeburth
- Tom Sawyer & Huckleberry Finn (2014), starring Joel Courtney as Tom Sawyer, Jake T. Austin as Huckleberry Finn, Katherine McNamara as Becky Thatcher

=== Television ===
- The Adventures of Huckleberry Finn (1955), a TV film adaptation starring Thomas Mitchell and John Carradine
- Huckleberry no Bōken (ハックルベリィの冒険), a 1976 Japanese anime with 26 episodes
- Huckleberry Finn and His Friends, a 1979 series starring Ian Tracey
- Adventures of Huckleberry Finn, a 1985 PBS TV adaptation directed by Peter H. Hunt, starring Patrick Day and Samm-Art Williams, with 4 one hour episodes (240 minutes)
- Huckleberry Finn Monogatari (ハックルベリー・フィン物語), a 1994 Japanese anime with 26 episodes, produced by NHK

=== Other ===
- The Adventures of Huckleberry Finn (1973), by Robert James Dixson – a simplified version
- Huckleberry Finn (1974), a musical film
- Big River: The Adventures of Huckleberry Finn, a 1985 Broadway musical with lyrics and music by Roger Miller
- Manga Classics: Adventures of Huckleberry Finn, published by UDON Entertainment's Manga Classics imprint was released in November 2017.
- Big Jim and the White Boy: An American Classic Reimagined, a graphic novel reimagining written and illustrated by David F. Walker and Marcus Kwame Anderson. Omitting Twain's negative portrayal of African Americans, Big Jim and the White Boy expands the original novel by depicting Big Jim as the primary protagonist and Huckleberry Finn as his sidekick. The plot has Big Jim and Huck journeying through Civil War-era United States to rescue the former's enslaved wife and children and even becoming Underground Railroad agents, before going throughout the decades as generations of Big Jim's descendants fight for their rights.

== Related works ==
=== Literature ===
- Finn: A Novel (2007), by Jon Clinch – a novel about Huck's father, Pap Finn (ISBN 0812977149)
- Huck Out West (2017), by Robert Coover – continues Huck's and Tom's adventures during the 1860s and 1870s (ISBN 0393608441)
- James (2024), by Percival Everett – a novel narrated by Jim that reimagines the plot of Twain's Adventures of Huckleberry Finn from his point of view. (ISBN 0385550367) Winner of the Pulitzer Prize for Fiction
- The Further Adventures of Huckleberry Finn (1983) by Greg Matthews – continues Huck's and Jim's adventures as they "light out for the territory" and wind up in the throes of the California Gold Rush of 1849
- My Jim (2005), by Nancy Rawles – a novel narrated largely by Sadie, Jim's enslaved wife (ISBN 140005401X)

=== Music ===
- Mississippi Suite (1926), by Ferde Grofe: the second movement is a lighthearted whimsical piece entitled "Huckleberry Finn"
- Huckleberry Finn EP (2009), comprising five songs from Kurt Weill's unfinished musical, by Duke Special

=== Television ===
- The New Adventures of Huckleberry Finn, a 1968 children's series produced by Hanna-Barbera combining live-action and animation

=== Art ===
- Huck and Jim by Charles Ray (artist) (2014) (an edition of 2) Art Institute of Chicago

== See also ==
- Mark Twain bibliography
- List of films featuring slavery
- The Story of a Bad Boy
