= Metropolitan African Methodist Episcopal Zion Church =

Historic church in Connecticut, United States

- U.S. National Register of Historic Places
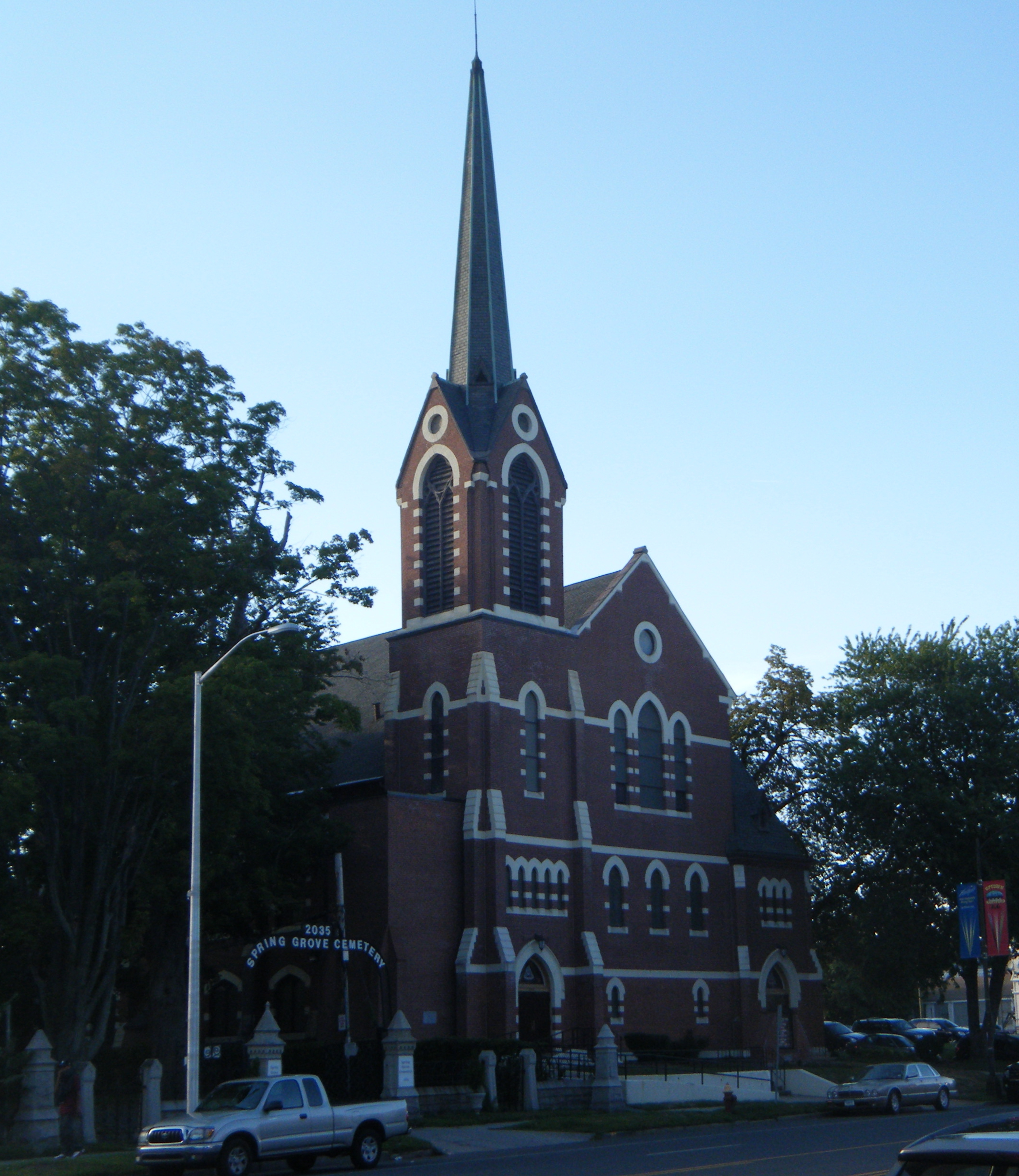

- Location within Connecticut Location within the United States
- Location: 2051 Main Street, Hartford, Connecticut
- Coordinates: 41°46′58″N 72°40′37″W
- Area: 0.5 acres (0.20 ha)
- Built: 1873
- Architect: Waters, E.H.
- Architectural style: Late Victorian
- NRHP reference No.: 94000769
- Added to NRHP: July 22, 1994

The Metropolitan African Methodist Episcopal Zion Church (also known as North Methodist Episcopal Church) is a historic Methodist Episcopal Church at 2051 Main Street in Hartford, Connecticut. This High Victorian Gothic structure was built in 1873-74 for an Episcopal congregation, and has since 1926 been the home to the city's oldest African-American congregation, which was established in 1833. The church was listed on the National Register of Historic Places in 1994.

== Architecture and history ==
The Metropolitan African Methodist Episcopal Zion Church is located in Hartford north side Clay-Arsenal neighborhood, on the west side of Main Street just north of Mahl Avenue. It is a large 3-1/2 story brick structure with stone trim. A large gable faces the street, with a pair of entrances at opposite ends of the facade. The left entrance is topped by a buttressed tower with belfry and steeple. Windows have Gothic pointed arches, and are set in varying groups and sizes on the facade, with pale stone headers. Stone beltcourses separate the various levels of the building.

The church was built in 1873-74 for a predominantly white Methodist Episcopal congregation. That congregation moved to a new building in 1919, selling this one to a Jewish congregation, which used it as a synagogue until 1926. The present congregation, whose roots date to 1833, purchased the building in that year. The Metropolitan AME congregation was first located on Elm Street, in a building later taken by the city as part of Bushnell Park. It then built a new church on Pearl Street, which was replaced by a larger one on the same site in 1898, which it occupied until acquiring this property.

== See also ==
- National Register of Historic Places listings in Hartford, Connecticut
