= The Definitive Vince Guaraldi =

Compilation album by Vince Guaraldi
- Released: November 3, 2009 (U.S.); November 2, 2009 (UK)
- Recorded: 1955–1966, 1973
- Genres: Jazz; Latin jazz; Bossa nova; Soundtrack; West Coast jazz; Christmas music; Contemporary Christian
- Length: 140:40
- Labels: Fantasy; Concord
- Producers: Vince Guaraldi, Nick Phillips

Vince Guaraldi chronology
Essential Standards (2009)	The Definitive Vince Guaraldi (2009)	The Navy Swings (2010)

Professional ratings
Review scores
Source	Rating
AllMusic	3.5/5 stars
Five Cents Please	5/5 stars
All About Jazz	4/5 stars

The Definitive Vince Guaraldi is Fantasy/Concord Records compilation album of songs by American jazz pianist/composer Vince Guaraldi released on November 3, 2009. It contains 31 tracks over two CDs, highlighting Guaraldi's Peanuts work as well his collaborations with guitarist Bola Sete.

The album was released on 180-gram vinyl on November 20, 2015 as a 4-LP box set.

As the release was label-specific containing material Guaraldi recorded for Fantasy Records, it excludes tracks from Guaraldi's three Warner Bros.-Seven Arts releases (Oh Good Grief!, The Eclectic Vince Guaraldi, Alma-Ville) as well as Vince Guaraldi with the San Francisco Boys Chorus (1967) released on Guaraldi's own D&D record label. Guaraldi's three Warner Bros. albums were released separately by Omnivore Recordings as part of the 2-disc set The Complete Warner Bros.–Seven Arts Recordings in July 2018.

== Critical reception ==
PopMatters critic Andrew Zender commented that "the buoyant brilliance of [Guaraldi]'s tunes transport you to another place — and can even make you feel like a kid again, or like dancing on a piano. Isn't that what all music is supposed to do?" AllMusic critic Al Campbell noted that The Definitive Vince Guaraldi is a "noteworthy compilation [that] focuses not only on Guaraldi as the composer of songs from the Charlie Brown television cartoon, but as a versatile jazz pianist."

== Track listing ==
All tracks are written by Vince Guaraldi except where noted.

Disc One
No.	Title	Writer(s)	Original album	Length
1.	"Calling Dr. Funk"		Modern Music from San Francisco (1956)	6:56
2.	"Fascinating Rhythm"	George Gershwin; Ira Gershwin	Vince Guaraldi Trio (1956)	2:48
3.	"Never Never Land"	Betty Comden; Adolph Green; Jule Styne	Vince Guaraldi Trio	4:15
4.	"Fenwyck's Farfel"		Vince Guaraldi Trio	4:05
5.	"A Flower Is a Lovesome Thing"	Billy Strayhorn	A Flower Is a Lovesome Thing (1958)	5:37
6.	"Softly, As In a Morning Sunrise"	Oscar Hammerstein II; Sigmund Romberg	A Flower Is a Lovesome Thing	3:28
7.	"Samba De Orfeu" (aka "Samba de Orpheus")	Luiz Bonfá	Jazz Impressions of Black Orpheus (1962)	5:37
8.	"Cast Your Fate to the Wind"		Jazz Impressions of Black Orpheus	3:05
9.	"Manhã de Carnaval"	Luiz Bonfá	Jazz Impressions of Black Orpheus	5:45
10.	"Moon River"	Henry Mancini	Jazz Impressions of Black Orpheus	5:16
11.	"Jitterbug Waltz" (live)	Fats Waller; Charles Randolph Grean; Maxine Manners	In Person (1963)	5:32
12.	"On Green Dolphin Street" (live)	Bronisław Kaper; Ned Washington	In Person	5:53
13.	"Star Song"	Vince Guaraldi; William Siden	Vince Guaraldi, Bola Sete and Friends (1964)	4:46
14.	"Days of Wine and Roses"	Henry Mancini	Vince Guaraldi, Bola Sete and Friends	5:20
Total length:				68:23

Disc two
No.	Title	Writer(s)	Original album	Length
15.	"Mr. Lucky"	Henry Mancini	The Latin Side of Vince Guaraldi (1964)	5:37
16.	"Corcovado (Quiet Nights of Quiet Stars)"	Antônio Carlos Jobim	The Latin Side of Vince Guaraldi	3:20
17.	"Work Song"	Nat Adderley; Oscar Brown, Jr.	The Latin Side of Vince Guaraldi	4:12
18.	"Ginza" (aka "Ginza Samba")		From All Sides (1965)	5:26
19.	"The Girl from Ipanema"	Antônio Carlos Jobim; Vinicius de Moraes	From All Sides	5:19
20.	"El Matador" (live)		Live at El Matador (1966)	4:34
21.	"Oh, Good Grief"	Vince Guaraldi; Lee Mendelson	Jazz Impressions of A Boy Named Charlie Brown (1964)	2:21
22.	"Linus and Lucy"		Jazz Impressions of A Boy Named Charlie Brown	3:03
23.	"Charlie Brown Theme"	Vince Guaraldi; Lee Mendelson	Jazz Impressions of A Boy Named Charlie Brown	4:20
24.	"Great Pumpkin Waltz" (featured in the Peanuts television special It's the Great Pumpkin, Charlie Brown (1966))		Charlie Brown's Holiday Hits (1998)	2:29
25.	"Thanksgiving Theme" (featured in the Peanuts television special A Charlie Brown Thanksgiving (1973))		Charlie Brown's Holiday Hits	2:02
26.	"Christmas Is Coming"		A Charlie Brown Christmas (1965)	3:25
27.	"Christmas Time Is Here" (instrumental)		A Charlie Brown Christmas	6:05
28.	"Skating"		A Charlie Brown Christmas	2:27
29.	"Theme to Grace"		At Grace Cathedral (1965)	4:13
30.	"Autumn Leaves"	Joseph Kosma	previously unreleased version recorded October 26, 1964; original version released on A Flower Is a Lovesome Thing	10:19
31.	"Blues For Peanuts"		previously unreleased; recorded May 26, 1964 during Jazz Impressions of A Boy Named Charlie Brown sessions	4:36
Total length:				73:48

== Personnel ==
Credits adapted from 2009 CD liner notes.

- Vince Guaraldi – piano, electric piano ("Thanksgiving Theme")
- Eddie Duran – guitar ("Fascinating Rhythm", "Fenwyck's Farfel", "A Flower Is A Lovesome Thing", "Softly, As In A Morning Sunrise", "Jitterbug Waltz", "On Green Dolphin Street", "Mr. Lucky", "Corcovado", "Work Song")
- John Gray – guitar ("Great Pumpkin Waltz")
- Bola Sete – guitar ("Star Song", "Days of Wine and Roses", "Ginza", "The Girl From Ipanema")
- Tom Beeson – double bass ("El Matador", "Theme To Grace")
- Dean Reilly – double bass ("Fascinating Rhythm", "Fenwyck's Farfel", "A Flower Is A Lovesome Thing", "Softly, As In A Morning Sunrise")
- Eugene Wright – double bass ("Calling Dr. Funk")
- Fred Marshall – double bass ("Jitterbug Waltz", "On Green Dolphin Street", "Star Song", "Days Of Wine And Roses", "Mr. Lucky", "Corcovado", "Work Song", "Christmas Is Coming", "Christmas Time Is Here", "Skating")
- Monty Budwig – double bass ("Samba De Orfeu", "Cast Your Fate to the Wind", "Manhã De Carnaval", "Moon River", "Ginza", "The Girl From Ipanema", "Oh, Good Grief", "Linus and Lucy", "Charlie Brown Theme", "Great Pumpkin Waltz", "Autumn Leaves", "Blues For Peanuts")
- Seward McCain – electric bass ("Thanksgiving Theme")
- Colin Bailey – drums ("Samba De Orfeu", "Cast Your Fate To The Wind", "Manhã De Carnaval", "Moon River", "Jitterbug Waltz", "On Green Dolphin Street", "Oh, Good Grief", "Linus and Lucy", "Charlie Brown Theme", "Great Pumpkin Waltz", "Autumn Leaves", "Blues For Peanuts")
- Jerry Granelli – drums ("Star Song", "Days Of Wine And Roses", "Mr. Lucky", "Corcovado", "Work Song", "Christmas is Coming", "Christmas Time Is Here (instrumental)", "Skating")
- John Markham – drums ("Calling Dr. Funk")
- Lee Charlton – drums ("El Matador", "Theme To Grace")
- Mike Clark – drums ("Thanksgiving Theme")
- Nicholas Martinez – drums ("Ginza", "The Girl From Ipanema")
- Jerry Dodgion – alto saxophone ("Calling Dr. Funk")
- Benny Velarde – timbales ("Work Song")
- Chuck Bennett – trombone ("Thanksgiving Theme")
- Emmanuel Klein – trumpet ("Great Pumpkin Waltz")
- Tom Harrell – trumpet ("Thanksgiving Theme")
- Bill Fitch – congas ("Work Song")
- St. Paul's Church of San Rafael 68-voice choir – choral chanting ("Theme To Grace")
- Barry Mineah – St. Paul's Church of San Rafael choral director ("Theme To Grace")

Additional

- Charles M. Schulz – cover illustration
- Doug Ramsey – liner notes
- Producer – Nick Phillips
- Mastering – Joe Tarantino
- Mastering – Adam Muñoz ("Autumn Leaves", "Blues for Peanuts")
- Editorial – Rikka Arnold
- Design – Jimmy Hole
- Project Assistance – Abbey Anna, Bill Belmont, Elizabeth Boettcher, Chris Clough, Jeffrey Spector

== See also ==
- Vince Guaraldi discography
- List of songs recorded by Vince Guaraldi
- List of cover versions of Vince Guaraldi songs
- Lee Mendelson Film Productions
