= List of cover versions of Vince Guaraldi songs =

This is a list of cover versions by music artists who have recorded one or more compositions written and originally recorded by American jazz pianist Vince Guaraldi (1928–76). This list also includes traditional songs recorded by Guaraldi covered by other artists who were faithful to Guaraldi's particular arrangement ("Hark! The Herald Angels Sing", "O Tannenbaum", "The Christmas Song", "Für Elise", "What Child Is This").

== List ==
Artist	Song	Year	Release	Notes
David Benoit	"Air Music"	2015	Believe	performed as "Guaraldi Medley"
Aaron Brask	"Air Music"	2010	The Guaraldi Sessions	aka "Surfin' Snoopy"
Joey Nardone Trio	"Air Music"	2019	A Charlie Brown Christmas – A Tribute to Vince Guaraldi Recorded Live in Nashville	aka "Surfin' Snoopy"
Bruce Polson	"Air Music"	1997	The Music of Vince Guaraldi	aka "Surfin' Snoopy"
George Winston	"Air Music"	2010	Love Will Come: The Music of Vince Guaraldi, Volume 2	aka "Surfin' Snoopy"
David Benoit	"Blue Charlie Brown"	2000	Here's to You, Charlie Brown: 50 Great Years!	
George Winston	"Bon Voyage"	1996	Linus and Lucy: The Music of Vince Guaraldi	
Baja Marimba Band	"Brasilia"	1965	Rides Again	
George Winston	"Brasilia"	2010	Love Will Come: The Music of Vince Guaraldi, Volume 2	
George Winston	"Calling Dr. Funk"	2010	Love Will Come: The Music of Vince Guaraldi, Volume 2	
101 Strings	"Cast Your Fate to the Wind"	1966	101 Strings Plus Guitars Galore	
Steve Alaimo	"Cast Your Fate to the Wind"	1966	Steve Alaimo Sings and Swings	
Steve Allen	"Cast Your Fate to the Wind"	1963	Steve Allen, Gravy Waltz and 11 Current Hits	
Herb Alpert and Lani Hall	"Cast Your Fate to the Wind"	2011	I Feel You	
Chet Atkins	"Cast Your Fate to the Wind"	1967	It's a Guitar World	
David Axelrod	"Cast Your Fate to the Wind"	1974	Heavy Axe	
Baja Marimba Band	"Cast Your Fate to the Wind"	1966	Watch Out!	
David Benoit	"Cast Your Fate to the Wind"	1989	Waiting for Spring	
George Benson	"Cast Your Fate to the Wind"	1976	Good King Bad	
Bonney & Buzz	"Cast Your Fate to the Wind"	2008	Bang It Again	
Aaron Brask	"Cast Your Fate to the Wind"	2010	The Guaraldi Sessions	
Don Brennan	"Cast Your Fate to the Wind"	2008	Well, to Begin With	
Paul Brooks	"Cast Your Fate to the Wind"	1998	Walk in the Black Forest	
Larry Brown	"Cast Your Fate to the Wind"	2006	The Long Goodbye	
Dave Brubeck	"Cast Your Fate to the Wind"	1988	Quiet as the Moon	soundtrack for the episode "The NASA Space Station" from This Is America, Charlie Brown
Ray Bryant	"Cast Your Fate to the Wind"	1997	Ray's Tribute to His Jazz Piano Friends	
Russ Conway	"Cast Your Fate to the Wind"	1998	Walk in the Black Forest	
Warren Covington	"Cast Your Fate to the Wind"	1964	Let's Dance Latin	
Floyd Cramer	"Cast Your Fate to the Wind"	1965	Class of '65	
Xavier Cugat	"Cast Your Fate to the Wind"	1965	Feeling Good	
Bill Cunliffe	"Cast Your Fate to the Wind"	1995	Bill in Brazil	
Richard de Cluny	"Cast Your Fate to the Wind"	2004	Romantic Instrumentals — Piano Nights	
Martin Denny	"Cast Your Fate to the Wind"	1966	Golden Greats	
Terry Disley	"Cast Your Fate to the Wind"	2011	Brubeck Vs. Guaraldi	
Klaus Doldinger	"Cast Your Fate to the Wind"	2001	Works and Passion	
Buddy Fambro	"Cast Your Fate to the Wind"	2004	Higher Consciousness	
Ferrante & Teicher	"Cast Your Fate to the Wind"	1965	Only the Best	
Shelby Flint	"Cast Your Fate to the Wind"	1966	Cast Your Fate to the Wind	
Free Wind	"Cast Your Fate to the Wind"	2008	Piano Chillout	
Graham Blvd	"Cast Your Fate to the Wind"	2010	Songs for Pirate Radio	
Jerry Granelli Trio	"Cast Your Fate to the Wind"	2020	The Jerry Granelli Trio Plays the Music of Vince Guaraldi and Mose Allison	
Steve Hall	"Cast Your Fate to the Wind"	2007	Swept Away	
Joe Harnell	"Cast Your Fate to the Wind"	1966	Golden Piano Hits	
Hollyrock	"Cast Your Fate to the Wind"	1987	Legalize Freedom	
James Gang	"Cast Your Fate to the Wind"	1970	James Gang Rides Again	interpolated in the song "The Bomber: a) Closet Queen b) Boléro c) Cast Your Fate To The Wind (Medley)"
Horst Jankowski	"Cast Your Fate to the Wind"	1966	More Genius of Jankowski	
Jazz East	"Cast Your Fate to the Wind"	2002	The Springwater Incident	
Quincy Jones	"Cast Your Fate to the Wind"	1963	Quincy Jones Plays Hip Hits	
Quincy Jones	"Cast Your Fate to the Wind"	1971	Smackwater Jack	
Anita Kerr Singers	"Cast Your Fate to the Wind"	1966	Slightly Baroque	
Earl Klugh	"Cast Your Fate to the Wind"	1978	Magic in Your Eyes	
Ramsey Lewis	"Cast Your Fate to the Wind"	1966	Goin' Latin	
Jennifer Leitham	"Cast Your Fate to the Wind"	2008	Left Coast Story	
Dan Luevano	"Cast Your Fate to the Wind"	2004	Simpler Times	
Arthur Lyman	"Cast Your Fate to the Wind"	1965	Cast Your Fate to the Wind	reissue of At the Crescendo (1963)
Dean Magraw with Barbara Gaskin	"Cast Your Fate to the Wind"	1994	Broken Silence	
The Marketts	"Cast Your Fate to the Wind"	1973	AM-FM, Etc.	
George Martin and His Orchestra	"Cast Your Fate to the Wind"	1965	single	
Marianne Mille	"Cast Your Fate to the Wind"	1965		as "Ne tremble pas mon pauvre coeur"
Dave Pell	"Cast Your Fate to the Wind"	2004	Meditation	
Gretchen Phillips (with David Driver)	"Cast Your Fate to the Wind"	2003	Togetherness	
Karin Plato	"Cast Your Fate to the Wind"	2003	The State of Bliss	
Nelson Rangell	"Cast Your Fate to the Wind"	2005	My American Songbook, Vol. 1	
Johnny Rivers	"Cast Your Fate to the Wind"	1966	Changes	
The Sandpipers	"Cast Your Fate to the Wind"	1966	Guantanamera	
Sounds Orchestral	"Cast Your Fate to the Wind"	1964	Cast Your Fate to the Wind	
The Starlight Orchestra	"Cast Your Fate to the Wind"	2006	Pop Hits on the Piano	
Dave Stewart with Barbara Gaskin	"Cast Your Fate to the Wind"	1991	Spin	
Billy Strange and The Challengers	"Cast Your Fate to the Wind"	1967	Billy Strange and The Challengers	
Mike Strickland	"Cast Your Fate to the Wind"	1994	My Favorite Things	
Nick Stubblefield	"Cast Your Fate to the Wind"	2003	Tried As an Adult	
Shirley Théroux	"Cast Your Fate to the Wind"	1967		as "Le nez dans le vent"
The In Crowd	"Cast Your Fate to the Wind"	1965	The In Crowd	
Allen Toussaint	"Cast Your Fate to the Wind"	1970	Toussaint	aka From a Whisper to a Scream
Allen Toussaint	"Cast Your Fate to the Wind"	2013	The Wolf of Wall Street: Music from the Motion Picture	
Mel Tormé	"Cast Your Fate to the Wind"	1963	single	
Laurens van Rooyen	"Cast Your Fate to the Wind"	1996	Traveller	
Larry Vuckovich	"Cast Your Fate to the Wind"	1984	Cast Your Fate	
We Five	"Cast Your Fate to the Wind"	1965	You Were on My Mind	
Roger Williams	"Cast Your Fate to the Wind"	1976	single	
Harald Winkler and the Norman Candler Orchestra	"Cast Your Fate to the Wind"	1976	Guitar on the Shore	
George Winston	"Cast Your Fate to the Wind"	1996	Linus and Lucy: The Music of Vince Guaraldi	
Jimmy Wisner	"Cast Your Fate to the Wind"	1965	Cast Your Fate to the Wind	
Jim Martinez	"Cast Your Fate to the Wind"	2015	Good Grief! It's Still Jim Martinez (A Tribute to Guaraldi, Schulz, and Peanuts	
Bruce Polson	"Charlie Brown and His All-Stars"	1997	The Music of Vince Guaraldi	retitled "Charlie Brown All Stars"
George Winston	"Charlie Brown and His All-Stars"	1996	Linus and Lucy: The Music of Vince Guaraldi	
David Benoit	"Charlie Brown Theme"	2000	Here's to You, Charlie Brown: 50 Great Years!	
Aaron Brask	"Charlie Brown Theme"	2010	The Guaraldi Sessions	
Cartoon Christmas Trio	"Charlie Brown Theme"	2008	Cartoon Christmas Trio	retitled "Charlie Brown"
Wynton Marsalis Septet	"Charlie Brown Theme"	1995	Joe Cool's Blues	
Lori Menchem	"Charlie Brown Theme"	2011	Christmas Is Coming: A Tribute to "A Charlie Brown Christmas"	
Amani A. W. Murray	"Charlie Brown Theme"	1989	Happy Anniversary, Charlie Brown!	
Joey Nardone Trio	"Charlie Brown Theme"	2019	A Charlie Brown Christmas – A Tribute to Vince Guaraldi Recorded Live in Nashville	
Bruce Polson	"Charlie Brown Theme"	1997	The Music of Vince Guaraldi	
Wayman Tisdale	"Charlie Brown Theme"	2005	40 Years: A Charlie Brown Christmas	
Nate Hance	"Charlie Brown Theme"	2022	A Charlie Brown Christmas NHanced	
Isaiah J. Thompson	"Charlie Brown Theme" (feat. John Pizzarelli)	2023	A Guaraldi Holiday	
Aaron Brask	"Charlie's Blues"	2010	The Guaraldi Sessions	aka "Charlie Brown Blues" and "Play It Again, Charlie Brown"
David Benoit	"Christmas Is Coming"	1996	Remembering Christmas	
David Benoit	"Christmas Is Coming"	2005	40 Years: A Charlie Brown Christmas	
David Benoit	"Christmas Is Coming"	2015	Believe	performed as "Guaraldi Medley"
David Benoit	"Christmas Is Coming"	2020	It's a David Benoit Christmas!	
Andrew Bird	"Christmas Is Coming"	2020	Hark!	
Eric Byrd Trio	"Christmas Is Coming"	2009	A Charlie Brown Christmas	
Cyrus Chestnut and Friends	"Christmas Is Coming"	2000	A Charlie Brown Christmas	
Jose "Juicy" Gonzales Trio	"Christmas Is Coming"	2016	Linus and Juicy: A Holiday Album	
Ben Gunning	"Christmas Is Coming"	2009	A Peanuts Christmas: The 2009 Zunior Holiday Album	fundraiser release for Daily Bread Food Bank, Toronto, Ontario
Lenny Marcus Trio	"Christmas Is Coming"	2009	Comfort and Joy	
Wynton Marsalis Septet	"Christmas Is Coming"	1995	Joe Cool's Blues	
MellowHype	"Christmas Is Coming"	2010	BlackenedWhite	sampled in the song "Hell"
Lori Menchem	"Christmas Is Coming"	2011	Christmas Is Coming: A Tribute to "A Charlie Brown Christmas"	
Joey Nardone Trio	"Christmas Is Coming"	2019	A Charlie Brown Christmas – A Tribute to Vince Guaraldi Recorded Live in Nashville	
The Ornaments	"Christmas Is Coming"	2011	A Vince Guaraldi Christmas: Live at Middletree	
The Piano Guys	"Christmas Is Coming"	2013	The Piano Guys 2	performed as "Charlie Brown Medley"
Eric Byrd Trio	"Christmas Is Coming"	2021	Charlie Brown Live	recorded live at the Carroll Arts Center, Westminster, Maryland
Mich Shirey Trio	"Christmas Is Coming"	2021	Guitar for Guaraldi: A Christmas Tribute	
Doc Watkins	"Christmas Is Coming"	2022	The Music of A Charlie Brown Christmas	
Nate Hance	"Christmas Is Coming"	2022	A Charlie Brown Christmas NHanced	
Isaiah J. Thompson	"Christmas Is Coming"	2023	A Guaraldi Holiday	
Peter Sprague	"Christmas Is Coming"	2023	Christmas Time Is Here	
Jill Barber	"The Christmas Song"	2009	A Peanuts Christmas: The 2009 Zunior Holiday Album	fundraiser release for Daily Bread Food Bank, Toronto, Ontario
David Benoit	"The Christmas Song"	1996	Remembering Christmas	
David Benoit	"The Christmas Song"	2020	It's a David Benoit Christmas!	
Cyrus Chestnut and Friends	"The Christmas Song"	2000	A Charlie Brown Christmas	
Jose "Juicy" Gonzales Trio	"The Christmas Song"	2016	Linus and Juicy: A Holiday Album	
Jim Martinez	"The Christmas Song"	2005	A Jim Martinez Jazzy Christmas	
Lori Menchem	"The Christmas Song"	2011	Christmas Is Coming: A Tribute to "A Charlie Brown Christmas"	
Joey Nardone Trio	"The Christmas Song"	2005	40 Years: A Charlie Brown Christmas	
Joey Nardone Trio	"The Christmas Song"	2019	A Charlie Brown Christmas – A Tribute to Vince Guaraldi Recorded Live in Nashville	
The Ornaments	"The Christmas Song"	2011	A Vince Guaraldi Christmas: Live at Middletree	
Mich Shirey Trio	"The Christmas Song"	2021	Guitar for Guaraldi: A Christmas Tribute	
Doc Watkins	"The Christmas Song"	2022	The Music of A Charlie Brown Christmas	
Peter Sprague	"The Christmas Song"	2023	Christmas Time Is Here	
Isaiah J. Thompson	"The Christmas Song (Chestnuts Roasting on an Open Fire)" (feat. Robbie Lee)	2023	A Guaraldi Holiday	
Patti Austin	"Christmas Time Is Here"	1989	Happy Anniversary, Charlie Brown!	
The Awkward Stage	"Christmas Time Is Here"	2009	A Peanuts Christmas: The 2009 Zunior Holiday Album	fundraiser release for Daily Bread Food Bank, Toronto, Ontario
David Benoit	"Christmas Time Is Here"	1983	Christmastime	
David Benoit	"Christmas Time Is Here"	1983	Christmastime	instrumental
David Benoit	"Christmas Time Is Here"	1996	Remembering Christmas	
David Benoit	"Christmas Time Is Here"	2000	Here's to You, Charlie Brown: 50 Great Years!	
David Benoit	"Christmas Time Is Here"	2015	Believe	vocal
David Benoit	"Christmas Time Is Here"	2020	It's a David Benoit Christmas!	
Boston Pops Orchestra and Keith Lockhart	"Christmas Time Is Here"	1998	Holiday Pops	
Aaron Brask	"Christmas Time Is Here"	2010	The Guaraldi Sessions	
Toni Braxton	"Christmas Time Is Here"	2001	Snowflakes	
Tom Braxton	"Christmas Time Is Here"	2023	Comfort and Joy	
Eric Byrd Trio	"Christmas Time Is Here"	2009	A Charlie Brown Christmas	
Mariah Carey	"Christmas Time Is Here"	2010	Merry Christmas II You	retitled "Charlie Brown Christmas"
Mariah Carey	"Christmas Time Is Here"	2020	Mariah Carey's Magical Christmas Special	
Canadian Brass	"Christmas Time Is Here"	2013	Christmas Time is Here	
Cartoon Christmas Trio	"Christmas Time Is Here"	2008	Cartoon Christmas Trio	
Cyrus Chestnut and Friends	"Christmas Time Is Here"	2000	A Charlie Brown Christmas	
Chicago	"Christmas Time Is Here"	1998	Chicago XXV: The Christmas Album	
Shawn Colvin	"Christmas Time Is Here"	1998	Holiday Songs and Lullabies	
Lauren Daigle	"Christmas Time Is Here"	2016	Behold: A Christmas Collection	
Devin Dawson	"Christmas Time Is Here"	2018	Spotify exclusive single	
Brett Eldredge	"Christmas Time Is Here"	2018	Glow (Deluxe)	
Ron Escheté	"Christmas Time Is Here"	1982	Christmas Impressions	
A Fine Frenzy	"Christmas Time Is Here"	2009	Oh Blue Christmas	
The Four Freshmen	"Christmas Time Is Here"	2007	Snowfall	
Fourplay	"Christmas Time Is Here"	1999	Snowbound	
Jose "Juicy" Gonzales Trio	"Christmas Time Is Here"	2016	Linus and Juicy: A Holiday Album	
Jerry Granelli Trio	"Christmas Time Is Here"	2020	The Jerry Granelli Trio Plays the Music of Vince Guaraldi and Mose Allison	
Meral Güneyman	"Christmas Time Is Here"	2004	A Christmas Memory	
Ivy	"Christmas Time Is Here"	2004	Maybe This Christmas Tree	
Al Jarreau	"Christmas Time Is Here"	2008	Christmas	
Jars of Clay	"Christmas Time Is Here"	2007	Christmas Songs	
Norah Jones	"Christmas Time Is Here"	2021	I Dream of Christmas	
Tori Kelly	"Christmas Time Is Here"	2020	A Tori Kelly Christmas	
Jason Kenemy and Dave Clark	"Christmas Time Is Here"	2009	A Peanuts Christmas: The 2009 Zunior Holiday Album	fundraiser release for Daily Bread Food Bank, Toronto, Ontario
Stacey Kent	"Christmas Time Is Here"	2020	Christmas in the Rockies	
Khruangbin	"Christmas Time Is Here"	2018	single	
Diana Krall	"Christmas Time Is Here"	2005	Christmas Songs	
John Legend	"Christmas Time Is Here"	2018	A Legendary Christmas	
Kenny Loggins	"Christmas Time Is Here"	1998	December	
Melissa Manchester	"Christmas Time Is Here"	1997	Joy	
Lenny Marcus Trio	"Christmas Time Is Here"	2009	Comfort and Joy	
Eric Marienthal	"Christmas Time Is Here"	2005	40 Years: A Charlie Brown Christmas	
Jim Martinez	"Christmas Time Is Here"	2005	A Jim Martinez Jazzy Christmas	
Johnny Mathis	"Christmas Time Is Here"	2002	The Christmas Album	
Brian McKnight	"Christmas Time Is Here"	2005	40 Years: A Charlie Brown Christmas	
Sarah McLachlan	"Christmas Time Is Here"	2006	Wintersong	
Lori Menchem	"Christmas Time Is Here"	2011	Christmas Is Coming: A Tribute to "A Charlie Brown Christmas"	
Idina Menzel	"Christmas Time Is Here"	2019	Christmas: A Season of Love	
MercyMe	"Christmas Time Is Here"	2005	The Christmas Sessions	
Joey Nardone Trio	"Christmas Time Is Here"	2019	A Charlie Brown Christmas – A Tribute to Vince Guaraldi Recorded Live in Nashville	
Matt Nathanson	"Christmas Time Is Here"	2020	Farewell December	
The Ornaments	"Christmas Time Is Here"	2011	A Vince Guaraldi Christmas: Live at Middletree	
Bruce Polson	"Christmas Time Is Here"	1997	The Music of Vince Guaraldi	
LeAnn Rimes	"Christmas Time Is Here"	2015	Today Is Christmas	
Michael W. Smith (featuring Vince Gill)	"Christmas Time Is Here"	2014	The Spirit of Christmas	
Sam Sparro	"Christmas Time Is Here"	2017	Christmas in Blue	
Straight No Chaser	"Christmas Time Is Here"	2009	Christmas Cheers	
Take 6 (featuring Shelea Frazier)	"Christmas Time Is Here"	2010	The Most Wonderful Time of the Year	
Mel Tormé	"Christmas Time Is Here"	1992	Christmas Songs	
Steve Vai	"Christmas Time Is Here"	2000	The Seventh Song	
Stan Whitmire	"Christmas Time Is Here"	2009	A Piano Christmas	
Nancy Wilson	"Christmas Time Is Here"	2001	A Nancy Wilson Christmas	
George Winston	"Christmas Time Is Here"	2010	Love Will Come: The Music of Vince Guaraldi, Volume 2	
Eric Byrd Trio	"Christmas Time Is Here"	2021	Charlie Brown Live	recorded live at the Carroll Arts Center, Westminster, Maryland
Mich Shirey Trio	"Christmas Time Is Here"	2021	Guitar for Guaraldi: A Christmas Tribute	
Doc Watkins	"Christmas Time Is Here"	2022	The Music of A Charlie Brown Christmas	
Nate Hance	"Christmas Time Is Here"	2022	A Charlie Brown Christmas NHanced	
Isaiah J. Thompson	"Christmas Time Is Here"	2023	A Guaraldi Holiday	
Peter Sprague	"Christmas Time Is Here"	2023	Christmas Time Is Here	
George Winston	"Cops and Robbers"	2010	Love Will Come: The Music of Vince Guaraldi, Volume 2	performed as a medley with "It's a Mystery, Charlie Brown", titled "Woodstock"
George Winston	"Dilemma"	2010	Love Will Come: The Music of Vince Guaraldi, Volume 2	
George Winston	"Eight Five Five"	1996	Linus and Lucy: The Music of Vince Guaraldi	
George Winston	"Fenwyck's Farfel"	2010	Love Will Come: The Music of Vince Guaraldi, Volume 2	
David Benoit	"Frieda (With the Naturally Curly Hair)"	2000	Here's to You, Charlie Brown: 50 Great Years!	
David Benoit	"Für Elise"	2005	40 Years: A Charlie Brown Christmas	
Cyrus Chestnut and Friends	"Für Elise"	2000	A Charlie Brown Christmas	
Lenny Marcus Trio	"Für Elise"	2009	Comfort and Joy	
Ruth Minnikin	"Für Elise"	2009	A Peanuts Christmas: The 2009 Zunior Holiday Album	fundraiser release for Daily Bread Food Bank, Toronto, Ontario
Joey Nardone Trio	"Für Elise"	2019	A Charlie Brown Christmas – A Tribute to Vince Guaraldi Recorded Live in Nashville	
The Ornaments	"Für Elise"	2011	A Vince Guaraldi Christmas: Live at Middletree	
Doc Watkins	"Für Elise"	2022	The Music of A Charlie Brown Christmas	
Dan Dance Trio	"Ginza Samba"	2003	Live at the PY	
David Benoit	"The Great Pumpkin Waltz"	2008	Jazz for Peanuts	
Aaron Brask	"The Great Pumpkin Waltz"	2010	The Guaraldi Sessions	
Chick Corea	"The Great Pumpkin Waltz"	1989	Happy Anniversary, Charlie Brown!	
Terry Disley	"The Great Pumpkin Waltz"	2011	Brubeck Vs. Guaraldi	
Brad Myers & Michael Sharfe	"The Great Pumpkin Waltz"	2016	Sanguinaria	
Joey Nardone Trio	"The Great Pumpkin Waltz"	2019	A Charlie Brown Christmas – A Tribute to Vince Guaraldi Recorded Live in Nashville	
George Winston	"The Great Pumpkin Waltz"	1996	Linus and Lucy: The Music of Vince Guaraldi	
Mich Shirey Trio	"The Great Pumpkin Waltz"	2021	Guitar for Guaraldi: A Christmas Tribute	
Isaiah J. Thompson	"The Great Pumpkin Waltz"	2023	A Guaraldi Holiday	
Doc Watkins	"Greensleeves"	2022	The Music of A Charlie Brown Christmas	
Joey Nardone Trio	"Happiness Theme (Happiness Is"	2019	A Charlie Brown Christmas – A Tribute to Vince Guaraldi Recorded Live in Nashville	
Bruce Polson	"Happiness Is"	1997	The Music of Vince Guaraldi	retitled "Happiness Theme"
David Benoit	"Hark! The Herald Angels Sing"	1996	Remembering Christmas	
David Benoit	"Hark! The Herald Angels Sing"	2020	It's a David Benoit Christmas!	
Cyrus Chestnut and Friends	"Hark! The Herald Angels Sing"	2000	A Charlie Brown Christmas	
Jose "Juicy" Gonzales Trio	"Hark! The Herald Angels Sing"	2016	Linus and Juicy: A Holiday Album	
LaToya London	"Hark! The Herald Angels Sing"	2005	40 Years: A Charlie Brown Christmas	
Joey Nardone Trio	"Hark! The Herald Angels Sing"	2019	A Charlie Brown Christmas – A Tribute to Vince Guaraldi Recorded Live in Nashville	
The Ornaments	"Hark! The Herald Angels Sing"	2011	A Vince Guaraldi Christmas: Live at Middletree	
The Violet Archers feat. Ruedi, Sadie and Oliver	"Hark! The Herald Angels Sing"	2009	A Peanuts Christmas: The 2009 Zunior Holiday Album	fundraiser release for Daily Bread Food Bank, Toronto, Ontario
Doc Watkins	"Hark! The Herald Angels Sing"	2022	The Music of A Charlie Brown Christmas	
Peter Sprague	"Hark! The Herald Angels Sing"	2023	Christmas Time Is Here	
John Stowell / Michael Zilber Quartet	"Have Yourself a Vince Guaraldi Xmas"	2016	Basement Blues	
Aaron Brask	"He's Your Dog, Charlie Brown"	2010	The Guaraldi Sessions	
David Benoit	"Heartburn Waltz"	2008	Jazz for Peanuts	retitled "Be My Valentine"
Aaron Brask	"Heartburn Waltz"	2010	The Guaraldi Sessions	
George Winston	"Heartburn Waltz"	2010	Love Will Come: The Music of Vince Guaraldi, Volume 2	retitled "Be My Valentine"
Isaiah J. Thompson	"Heartburn Waltz" (feat. Alexa Tarantino)	2023	A Guaraldi Holiday	
George Winston	"Incumbent Waltz"	2010	Love Will Come: The Music of Vince Guaraldi, Volume 2	retitled "You're Elected, Charlie Brown"
George Winston	"It Was a Short Summer, Charlie Brown"	2010	Love Will Come: The Music of Vince Guaraldi, Volume 2	
George Winston	"It's a Mystery, Charlie Brown"	2010	Love Will Come: The Music of Vince Guaraldi, Volume 2	performed as a medley with "Cops and Robbers," titled "Woodstock"
Aaron Brask	"Jambo's (Casaba)"	2010	The Guaraldi Sessions	
George Winston	"Jambo's (Casaba)"	2010	Love Will Come: The Music of Vince Guaraldi, Volume 2	
B.B. King	"Joe Cool"	1989	Happy Anniversary, Charlie Brown!	
Jim Martinez	"Linus and Lucy"	2015	Good Grief! It's Still Jim Martinez (A Tribute to Guaraldi, Schulz, and Peanuts	
Barenaked Ladies	"Linus and Lucy"	1992	Gordon	interpolated in the song "Grade 9"
Christophe Beck	"Linus and Lucy"	2015	The Peanuts Movie	
David Benoit	"Linus and Lucy"	1986	This Side Up	
David Benoit	"Linus and Lucy"	1989	Happy Anniversary, Charlie Brown!	
David Benoit	"Linus and Lucy"	2000	Here's to You, Charlie Brown: 50 Great Years!	
David Benoit	"Linus and Lucy"	2020	It's a David Benoit Christmas!	
Aaron Brask	"Linus and Lucy"	2010	The Guaraldi Sessions	
Dave Brubeck	"Linus and Lucy"	1988	Quiet as the Moon	soundtrack for the episode "The NASA Space Station" from This Is America, Charlie Brown
Eric Byrd Trio	"Linus and Lucy"	2009	A Charlie Brown Christmas	
Cyrus Chestnut and Friends	"Linus and Lucy"	2000	A Charlie Brown Christmas	
Cartoon Christmas Trio	"Linus and Lucy"	2008	Cartoon Christmas Trio	
Terry Disley	"Linus and Lucy"	2011	Brubeck Vs. Guaraldi	
Béla Fleck and the Flecktones	"Linus and Lucy"	2008	Jingle All the Way	
Game Theory	"Linus and Lucy"	1986	Big Shot Chronicles	
Jose "Juicy" Gonzales Trio	"Linus and Lucy"	2016	Linus and Juicy: A Holiday Album	
Stuart Hamm	"Linus and Lucy"	1991	The Urge	
Dave Koz	"Linus and Lucy"	2005	40 Years: A Charlie Brown Christmas	
Wynton Marsalis Septet	"Linus and Lucy"	1995	Joe Cool's Blues	
Lori Menchem	"Linus and Lucy"	2011	Christmas Is Coming: A Tribute to "A Charlie Brown Christmas"	
Dave Merritt & The Quiet Revolution	"Linus and Lucy"	2009	A Peanuts Christmas: The 2009 Zunior Holiday Album	fundraiser release for Daily Bread Food Bank, Toronto, Ontario
moe.	"Linus and Lucy"	2002	Season's Greetings from Moe	
Joey Nardone Trio	"Linus and Lucy"	2019	A Charlie Brown Christmas – A Tribute to Vince Guaraldi Recorded Live in Nashville	
Michelle Obama	"Linus and Lucy"	2020	Becoming	
The Ornaments	"Linus and Lucy"	2011	A Vince Guaraldi Christmas: Live at Middletree	
Anderson .Paak	"Linus and Lucy"	2018	Spotify exclusive single	
The Piano Guys	"Linus and Lucy"	2013	The Piano Guys 2	performed as "Charlie Brown Medley"
Bruce Polson	"Linus and Lucy"	1997	The Music of Vince Guaraldi	
Los Straitjackets	"Linus and Lucy"	2015	The Quality Holiday Revue Live	Recorded while touring with Nick Lowe.
George Winston	"Linus and Lucy"	1996	Linus and Lucy: The Music of Vince Guaraldi	
Eric Byrd Trio	"Linus and Lucy"	2021	Charlie Brown Live	recorded live at the Carroll Arts Center, Westminster, Maryland
Mich Shirey Trio	"Linus and Lucy"	2021	Guitar for Guaraldi: A Christmas Tribute	
Doc Watkins	"Linus and Lucy"	2022	The Music of A Charlie Brown Christmas	
Isaiah J. Thompson	"Linus and Lucy"	2023	A Guaraldi Holiday	
Peter Sprague	"Linus and Lucy"	2023	Christmas Time Is Here	
Nate Hance	"Linus and Lucy" (funk)	2022	A Charlie Brown Christmas NHanced	
Joe Williams	"Little Birdie"	1989	Happy Anniversary, Charlie Brown!	
Wynton Marsalis Septet	"Little Birdie"	1995	Joe Cool's Blues	
George Winston	"Little Birdie"	2010	Love Will Come: The Music of Vince Guaraldi, Volume 2	retitled "Be My Valentine"
Isaiah J. Thompson	"Little Birdie" (feat. Tyreek McDole)	2023	A Guaraldi Holiday	
George Winston	"Little David"	2010	Love Will Come: The Music of Vince Guaraldi, Volume 2	performed as a medley with "Macedonia"
Aaron Brask	"Love Will Come"	2010	The Guaraldi Sessions	
Bruce Polson	"Love Will Come"	1997	The Music of Vince Guaraldi	
George Winston	"Love Will Come"	2010	Love Will Come: The Music of Vince Guaraldi, Volume 2	
George Winston	"Love Will Come 2"	2010	Love Will Come: The Music of Vince Guaraldi, Volume 2	
George Winston	"Macedonia"	2010	Love Will Come: The Music of Vince Guaraldi, Volume 2	performed as a medley with "Little David"
George Winston	"The Masked Marvel"	1996	Linus and Lucy: The Music of Vince Guaraldi	
George Winston	"Monterey"	1996	Linus and Lucy: The Music of Vince Guaraldi	
David Benoit	"My Little Drum"	2015	Believe	
David Benoit	"My Little Drum"	2020	It's a David Benoit Christmas!	
Rick Braun	"My Little Drum"	2005	40 Years: A Charlie Brown Christmas	
Cyrus Chestnut and Friends	"My Little Drum"	2000	A Charlie Brown Christmas	
Lenny Marcus Trio	"My Little Drum"	2009	Comfort and Joy	
Lori Menchem	"My Little Drum"	2011	Christmas Is Coming: A Tribute to "A Charlie Brown Christmas"	
Joey Nardone Trio	"My Little Drum"	2019	A Charlie Brown Christmas – A Tribute to Vince Guaraldi Recorded Live in Nashville	
The Ornaments	"My Little Drum"	2011	A Vince Guaraldi Christmas: Live at Middletree	
Nick Zubeck	"My Little Drum"	2009	A Peanuts Christmas: The 2009 Zunior Holiday Album	fundraiser release for Daily Bread Food Bank, Toronto, Ontario
Eric Byrd Trio	"My Little Drum"	2021	Charlie Brown Live	recorded live at the Carroll Arts Center, Westminster, Maryland
Doc Watkins	"My Little Drum"	2022	The Music of A Charlie Brown Christmas	
Nate Hance	"My Little Drum"	2022	A Charlie Brown Christmas NHanced	
George Winston	"Nobody Else"	2010	Love Will Come: The Music of Vince Guaraldi, Volume 2	
Gerald Albright	"O Tannenbaum"	2005	40 Years: A Charlie Brown Christmas	
David Benoit	"O Tannenbaum"	1983	Christmastime	
David Benoit	"O Tannenbaum"	2015	Believe	performed as "Guaraldi Medley"
David Benoit	"O Tannenbaum"	2020	It's a David Benoit Christmas!	
Eric Byrd Trio	"O Tannenbaum"	2009	A Charlie Brown Christmas	
Eric Byrd Trio	"O Tannenbaum"	2009	A Charlie Brown Christmas	
Cyrus Chestnut and Friends	"O Tannenbaum"	2000	A Charlie Brown Christmas	
Cartoon Christmas Trio	"O Tannenbaum"	2008	Cartoon Christmas Trio	
Jose "Juicy" Gonzales Trio	"O Tannenbaum"	2016	Linus and Juicy: A Holiday Album	
Don Kerr, Kevin Lacroix & Dave Wall	"O Tannenbaum"	2009	A Peanuts Christmas: The 2009 Zunior Holiday Album	fundraiser release for Daily Bread Food Bank, Toronto, Ontario
Lenny Marcus Trio	"O Tannenbaum"	2009	Comfort and Joy	
Jim Martinez	"O Tannenbaum"	2005	A Jim Martinez Jazzy Christmas	
Lori Menchem	"O Tannenbaum"	2011	Christmas Is Coming: A Tribute to "A Charlie Brown Christmas"	
Joey Nardone Trio	"O Tannenbaum"	2019	A Charlie Brown Christmas – A Tribute to Vince Guaraldi Recorded Live in Nashville	
The Ornaments	"O Tannenbaum"	2011	A Vince Guaraldi Christmas: Live at Middletree	
Eric Byrd Trio	"O Tannenbaum"	2021	Charlie Brown Live	retitled "Oh Christmas Tree"; recorded live at the Carroll Arts Center, Westminster, Maryland
Mich Shirey Trio	"O Tannenbaum"	2021	Guitar for Guaraldi: A Christmas Tribute	
Doc Watkins	"O Tannenbaum"	2022	The Music of A Charlie Brown Christmas	
Nate Hance	"O Tannenbaum"	2022	A Charlie Brown Christmas NHanced	
Peter Sprague	"O Tannenbaum"	2023	Christmas Time Is Here	
Isaiah J. Thompson	"O Tannenbaum" (feat. Anthony Hervey)	2023	A Guaraldi Holiday	
Nate Hance	"Oh Good Grief!"	2022	A Charlie Brown Christmas NHanced	
David Benoit	"Oh, Good Grief"	2020	It's a David Benoit Christmas!	
Wynton Marsalis Septet	"Oh, Good Grief"	1995	Joe Cool's Blues	
David Benoit	"Pebble Beach"	2000	Here's to You, Charlie Brown: 50 Great Years!	
David Benoit	"Pebble Beach"	2020	It's a David Benoit Christmas!	
Aaron Brask	"Pebble Beach"	2010	The Guaraldi Sessions	
Wynton Marsalis Septet	"Pebble Beach"	1995	Joe Cool's Blues	
George Winston	"Pebble Beach"	2010	Love Will Come: The Music of Vince Guaraldi, Volume 2	
David Benoit	"Peppermint Patty"	2020	It's a David Benoit Christmas!	
Aaron Brask	"Peppermint Patty"	2010	The Guaraldi Sessions	
Eric Byrd Trio	"Peppermint Patty"	2009	A Charlie Brown Christmas	
Terry Disley	"Peppermint Patty"	2011	Brubeck Vs. Guaraldi	
Bruce Polson	"Peppermint Patty"	1997	The Music of Vince Guaraldi	
George Winston	"Peppermint Patty"	1996	Linus and Lucy: The Music of Vince Guaraldi	
Nate Hance	"Peppermint Patty" (solo piano)	2022	A Charlie Brown Christmas NHanced	
Aaron Brask	"Rain, Rain Go Away"	2010	The Guaraldi Sessions	
George Winston	"Rain, Rain Go Away"	2010	Love Will Come: The Music of Vince Guaraldi, Volume 2	
Gerry Mulligan	"Rain, Rain, Go Away"	1989	Happy Anniversary, Charlie Brown!	
David Benoit	"Red Baron"	2000	Here's to You, Charlie Brown: 50 Great Years!	
David Benoit	"Red Baron"	2020	It's a David Benoit Christmas!	
Aaron Brask	"Red Baron"	2010	The Guaraldi Sessions	
Bruce Polson	"Red Baron"	1997	The Music of Vince Guaraldi	
Lee Ritenour	"Red Baron"	1989	Happy Anniversary, Charlie Brown!	
The Rippingtons	"Red Baron"	2005	40 Years: A Charlie Brown Christmas	
Tall Jazz	"Red Baron"	1993	How 'Bout Now?	
George Winston	"Remembrance"	1996	Linus and Lucy: The Music of Vince Guaraldi	
George Winston	"Room at the Bottom"	2010	Love Will Come: The Music of Vince Guaraldi, Volume 2	
Bruce Polson	"Schroeder"	1997	The Music of Vince Guaraldi	
Nate Hance	"Schroeder" (solo piano)	2022	A Charlie Brown Christmas NHanced	
David Benoit	"Skating"	1996	Remembering Christmas	
David Benoit	"Skating"	2020	It's a David Benoit Christmas!	
Andrew Bird	"Skating"	2020	Hark!	
Aaron Brask	"Skating"	2010	The Guaraldi Sessions	
Norman Brown	"Skating"	2005	40 Years: A Charlie Brown Christmas	
Eric Byrd Trio	"Skating"	2009	A Charlie Brown Christmas	
Cyrus Chestnut and Friends	"Skating"	2000	A Charlie Brown Christmas	
Cartoon Christmas Trio	"Skating"	2008	Cartoon Christmas Trio	
Jose "Juicy" Gonzales Trio	"Skating"	2016	Linus and Juicy: A Holiday Album	
Jim Martinez	"Skating"	2005	A Jim Martinez Jazzy Christmas	
Lori Menchem	"Skating"	2011	Christmas Is Coming: A Tribute to "A Charlie Brown Christmas"	
Joey Nardone Trio	"Skating"	2019	A Charlie Brown Christmas – A Tribute to Vince Guaraldi Recorded Live in Nashville	
Mike O'Neill	"Skating"	2009	A Peanuts Christmas: The 2009 Zunior Holiday Album	fundraiser release for Daily Bread Food Bank, Toronto, Ontario
The Ornaments	"Skating"	2011	A Vince Guaraldi Christmas: Live at Middletree	
Bruce Polson	"Skating"	1997	The Music of Vince Guaraldi	
George Winston	"Skating"	1996	Linus and Lucy: The Music of Vince Guaraldi	
Eric Byrd Trio	"Skating"	2021	Charlie Brown Live	recorded live at the Carroll Arts Center, Westminster, Maryland
Mich Shirey Trio	"Skating"	2021	Guitar for Guaraldi: A Christmas Tribute	
Nate Hance	"Skating"	2022	A Charlie Brown Christmas NHanced	
Doc Watkins	"Skating"/"The Christmas Waltz"	2022	The Music of A Charlie Brown Christmas	
George Winston	"Sprinkle Your Bird"	2010	Love Will Come: The Music of Vince Guaraldi, Volume 2	aka "Seeds for Thought"
Aaron Brask	"Star Song"	2010	The Guaraldi Sessions	
Jerry Granelli Trio	"Star Song"	2020	The Jerry Granelli Trio Plays the Music of Vince Guaraldi and Mose Allison	
Jim Martinez	"Surfin' Snoopy"	2015	Good Grief! It's Still Jim Martinez (A Tribute to Guaraldi, Schulz, and Peanuts	aka "Air Music"
Joey Nardone Trio	Thanksgiving Theme	2019	A Charlie Brown Christmas – A Tribute to Vince Guaraldi Recorded Live in Nashville	
George Winston	"Thanksgiving Theme"	1996	Linus and Lucy: The Music of Vince Guaraldi	retitled "A Charlie Brown Thanksgiving"
Isaiah J. Thompson	"Thanksgiving Theme"	2023	A Guaraldi Holiday	
Jim Martinez	"Theme to Grace"	2015	Good Grief! It's Still Jim Martinez (A Tribute to Guaraldi, Schulz, and Peanuts	
George Winston	"Theme to Grace"	1996	Linus and Lucy: The Music of Vince Guaraldi	
George Winston	"There's No Time for Love, Charlie Brown"	2010	Love Will Come: The Music of Vince Guaraldi, Volume 2	retitled "Time For Love"
Terry Disley	"Treat Street"	2011	Brubeck Vs. Guaraldi	
George Winston	"Treat Street"	1996	Linus and Lucy: The Music of Vince Guaraldi	
Diane Monroe & Tony Miceli	"Vince Guaraldi"	2014	Alone Together	
David Benoit	"What Child Is This"	1983	Christmastime	
David Benoit	"What Child Is This"	2015	Believe	performed as "Guaraldi Medley"
David Benoit	"What Child Is This"	2020	It's a David Benoit Christmas!	
Eric Byrd Trio	"What Child Is This"	2009	A Charlie Brown Christmas	
Cyrus Chestnut and Friends	"What Child Is This"	2000	A Charlie Brown Christmas	
Cyrus Chestnut and Friends	"What Child Is This"	2000	A Charlie Brown Christmas	aka "Greensleeves"
Construction and Destruction	"What Child Is This"	2009	A Peanuts Christmas: The 2009 Zunior Holiday Album	fundraiser release for Daily Bread Food Bank, Toronto, Ontario; aka "Greensleeves"
Lenny Marcus Trio	"What Child Is This"	2009	Comfort and Joy	
Lori Menchem	"What Child Is This"	2011	Christmas Is Coming: A Tribute to "A Charlie Brown Christmas"	
Joey Nardone Trio	"What Child Is This?"	2019	A Charlie Brown Christmas – A Tribute to Vince Guaraldi Recorded Live in Nashville	
The Ornaments	"What Child Is This?"	2011	A Vince Guaraldi Christmas: Live at Middletree	
Wayne Petti	"What Child Is This?"	2009	A Peanuts Christmas: The 2009 Zunior Holiday Album	fundraiser release for Daily Bread Food Bank, Toronto, Ontario
Eric Byrd Trio	"What Child Is This?"	2021	Charlie Brown Live	recorded live at the Carroll Arts Center, Westminster, Maryland
Peter Sprague	"What Child Is This?"	2023	Christmas Time Is Here	
Isaiah J. Thompson	"What Child Is This?" ("Greensleeves")	2023	A Guaraldi Holiday	
Nate Hance	"What Child Is This?" (funk)	2022	A Charlie Brown Christmas NHanced	
David Benoit	"You're in Love, Charlie Brown"	2008	Jazz for Peanuts	
David Benoit	"You're in Love, Charlie Brown"	2020	It's a David Benoit Christmas!	
Aaron Brask	"You're in Love, Charlie Brown"	2010	The Guaraldi Sessions	
Bruce Polson	"You're in Love, Charlie Brown"	1997	The Music of Vince Guaraldi	retitled "You're in Love"
George Winston	"You're in Love, Charlie Brown"	1996	Linus and Lucy: The Music of Vince Guaraldi	
George Winston	"Young Man's Fancy"	1996	Linus and Lucy: The Music of Vince Guaraldi	
Ron LeGault Quintet	"Air Music"		Charlie Brown Goes to the Nutcracker	aka "Surfin' Snoopy"
Mich Shirey Trio	"Air Music"	2021	Guitar for Guaraldi: A Christmas Tribute	aka "Surfin' Snoopy"
Claude Gnocchi	"Blue Charlie Brown"		TrumpetAmericana	
Liberty Junior School 8th Grade Jazz Band	"Blue Charlie Brown"	2019	Lakota Schools 2019 Winter Jazz Festival	
Fred Cantu and His Big Band	"Charlie Brown Theme"	2021	M.F.G.	
Sandra Lambert and Mike Eaves Quartet	"Charlie Brown Theme"		Too Late Now	
Ron LeGault Quintet	"Charlie Brown Theme"		Charlie Brown Goes to the Nutcracker	
Oliver Mewes Trio	"Charlie Brown Theme"		Trio	
Will Comer	"Frieda (With the Naturally Curly Hair)"		Off We Go	
Andy Fielding	"Frieda (With the Naturally Curly Hair)"		Playing for Keeps	
Jazz Arts Trio	"Freeway"		Tribute	
William Beatty	"Ginza Samba"		The Path of Green Stones	
Erik Deutsch	"Ginza Samba"		Live at Lunático	
Alex Diaz	"Ginza Samba"		Beyond 145th Street	
Eddie Duran	"Ginza Samba"	1979	Ginza	
Dick Fregulia Trio	"Ginza Samba"		Be There Now!	
Claudio Giambruno	"Ginza Samba"		Overseas	
Montage	"Ginza Samba"		Montage	
Giuliano Perin's Good Vibes Quartet	"Ginza Samba"		Sweet Lines	
Jeff Rupert and Veronica Swift	"Ginza Samba"		Let's Sail Away	
Vint, Versace & Black	"Oh, Good Grief"		A Charlie Brown Christmas: Live at the Century Room	listed as "Good Grief"
Joshua Bowlus	"The Great Pumpkin Waltz"		Sleigh Ride	
Jonathan Danis	"The Great Pumpkin Waltz"		A Jonathan Danis Christmas	
Neil Elliott Dorval	"The Great Pumpkin Waltz"		Romantic Lounge Live	
The Hit Crew	"The Great Pumpkin Waltz"	2007	Kids Halloween Movie Themes	
C. Holmes Trio	"The Great Pumpkin Waltz"		Christmas & You	
Shai Jaschek	"The Great Pumpkin Waltz"		First Fall	
Larry Johnson	"The Great Pumpkin Waltz"		Circles	
Luke Carlos O'Reilly	"The Great Pumpkin Waltz"		The Perfect Christmas	
Greg Reitan	"The Great Pumpkin Waltz"		Daybreak	
Trisha Wolf	"The Great Pumpkin Waltz"		Pop and Classical Ballet Class: Songs of Autumn	
Lior Yekutieli	"The Great Pumpkin Waltz"		Recent Memories	
George Mitchell	"Guaraldi Medley"		Ten Grands Tenth Anniversary	
Bruce Smith	"Vince Guaraldi Tribute"		Piano Trilogy 2	two-part Guaraldi medley
Claude Gnocchi	"Happiness Is"		TrumpetAmericana	retitled "Happiness Theme"
Ron LeGault Quintet	"Happiness Is"		Charlie Brown Goes to the Nutcracker	retitled "Happiness Theme"
Harry Skoler	"Happiness Is"		Conversations in the Language of Jazz	retitled "Happiness Theme"
Amanda Whiting	"Happiness Is"	2024	A Christmas Cwtch	retitled "Happiness Theme"
Rick Gallagher	"Heartburn Waltz"		Solo Standard Volume One	
Mark Kross Trio	"It Was a Short Summer, Charlie Brown"		Cacciatore	
Clara Plestis	"Little Birdie"		single	
Paul Tuvman	"Love Will Come"		Musically Speaking	
Guido Pistocchi Quintet	"Macedonia"		Spring Time	
Hue Blanes Trio	"Oh, Good Grief"		Chillin' with Blanes	
Claude Gnocchi	"Oh, Good Grief"		TrumpetAmericana	
Franco Reiss	"Oh, Good Grief"		Angel Eyes	
Ólafs Stephensen Trio	"Oh, Good Grief"		Nú er það svart maður!: Óli Steph í óperunni	
Lavender/Shell Duo	"The Peanuts Medley"		’Round Midnight	
Mason Embry Trio	"Pebble Beach"		A Song for You	
Claude Gnocchi	"Pebble Beach"		TrumpetAmericana	
Ron LeGault Quintet	"Pebble Beach"		Charlie Brown Goes to the Nutcracker	
Roby Perissin and the Latin Jazz Ensemble	"Pebble Beach"		Tribute to Latin Jazz	
Oliver Mewes Trio	"Peppermint Patty"		Trio	
Lee Shapiro	"Rain, Rain, Go Away"		Somewhere	
Tim Dueñas Latin Jazz Trio	"Star Song"		Originals: 9 + 3	
Jonathan Danis	"Thanksgiving Theme"		A Jonathan Danis Christmas	
Harold Betters	"Theme to Grace"		Funk City Express	
Paul Tuvman	"You're in Love, Charlie Brown"		Musically Speaking	

== See also ==
- List of songs recorded by Vince Guaraldi
- Lee Mendelson Film Productions
