= Charlie Brown's Holiday Hits =

Compilation album by Vince Guaraldi
- Released: September 8, 1998
- Recorded: October 1964–December 1974, 1983, 1998
- Genres: Jazz pop; soundtrack
- Length: 37:07
- Label: Fantasy

Vince Guaraldi chronology
Greatest Hits (1980)	Charlie Brown's Holiday Hits (1998)	Jazz Casual: Paul Winter/Bola Sete and Vince Guaraldi (2001)

Professional ratings
Review scores
Source	Rating
AllMusic	3.5/5 stars
All About Jazz	5/5 stars
Five Cents Please	4/5 stars

Charlie Brown's Holiday Hits is a compilation soundtrack album by jazz pianist Vince Guaraldi (credited to the Vince Guaraldi Trio) released by Fantasy Records in 1998. The album was the first of several posthumous releases containing a mix of previously released material in addition to nine previously unavailable songs featured in prime-time animated television specials based on the Peanuts comic strip by Charles M. Schulz.

== Background ==
Vince Guaraldi died of a ruptured abdominal aortic aneurysm on February 6, 1976, at age 47, having composed music scores for 16 Peanuts television specials and the feature film A Boy Named Charlie Brown. Despite the wealth of material Guaraldi recorded for these specials, only three album's worth of Peanuts songs were released during his lifetime: Jazz Impressions of A Boy Named Charlie Brown (1964), A Charlie Brown Christmas (1965) and Oh Good Grief! (1968).

After the 1996 tribute album Linus and Lucy: The Music of Vince Guaraldi by New Age pianist George Winston sparked renewed interest in Guaraldi's music, Fantasy Records assembled a compilation album in 1998, 22 years after Guaraldi's final Peanuts project (It's Arbor Day, Charlie Brown (1976)).

Charlie Brown's Holiday Hits contains a mix of previously released material featured on the Fantasy releases Jazz Impressions of A Boy Named Charlie Brown and A Charlie Brown Christmas plus unreleased music cues from Charlie Brown's All Stars! (1966), It's the Great Pumpkin, Charlie Brown (1966), A Charlie Brown Thanksgiving (1973) and Be My Valentine, Charlie Brown (1975). Several music cues were sourced directly from the television audio tracks and were licensed for inclusion from Lee Mendelson Film Productions.

Fantasy also inadvertently included one non-Guaraldi track ("Joe Cool"), a composite of two music cues composed by Ed Bogas and Desirée Goyette for The Charlie Brown and Snoopy Show (CBS, 1983–85). The title bears no relation to the multiple renditions of "Joe Cool" composed by Guaraldi during his lifetime.

== Critical reception ==
Guaraldi historian Derrick Bang commented that the newly released material "is a joy, although some of these cuts are a bit 'muddy', and they lack the polish and studio perfection of Fantasy's earlier releases; they have an unsweetened quality, and display the uneven volume, jump starts and slow fades that betray their probable origins from television audio tracks." AllMusic critic Cub Koda said the wealth of unreleased material was a "true goldmine" for fans.

== Track listing ==
All songs written by Vince Guaraldi except where noted. Proper titles appear with mistitled tracks in parentheses.

No.	Title	Writer(s)	Original album	Length
1.	"Joe Cool^{[a]}^{[tv]}"	Ed Bogas; Desirée Goyette		2:07
2.	"Air Music^{[tv]}" (aka "Surfin' Snoopy")			1:11
3.	"Heartburn Waltz^{[tv]}"			2:38
4.	"Track Meet^{[b]}^{[c]}"			2:40
5.	"Camptown Races^{[b]}"	Stephen Foster; arranged by Vince Guaraldi		2:25
6.	"Oh, Good Grief^{[d]}" (aka "Schroeder")			2:00
7.	"Charlie Brown Theme"	Vince Guaraldi; Lee Mendelson	Jazz Impressions of A Boy Named Charlie Brown (1964)	2:00
8.	"Schroeder"		Jazz Impressions of A Boy Named...	1:54
9.	"Charlie's Blues^{[tv]}" (aka "Charlie Brown Blues/"Play It Again, Charlie Brown")			1:22
10.	"The Great Pumpkin Waltz^{[tv]}"			2:29
11.	"Thanksgiving Theme^{[e]}^{[tv]}"			2:02
12.	"Linus and Lucy"		Jazz Impressions of A Boy Named... A Charlie Brown Christmas (1965)	3:07
13.	"Christmas Time Is Here" (vocal)	Vince Guaraldi; Lee Mendelson	A Charlie Brown Christmas	2:46
14.	"Christmas Time Is Here" (instrumental)		A Charlie Brown Christmas	6:03
Total length:				37:07^{[tv]}

Notes
^{^[a]} non-Guaraldi track; song is a composite of two untitled music cues composed by Ed Bogas and Desirée Goyette for The Charlie Brown and Snoopy Show (1983)
^{^[b]} recorded July 29, 1965
^{^[c]} re-recorded for A Charlie Brown Christmas as "Christmas Is Coming"
^{^[d]} vocal number sung by members of Glenn Mendelson's (son of Lee Mendelson) Grade 6 class; song is titled "Oh, Good Grief" but melody is taken from "Schroeder"
^{^[e]} composite edit of Reprise and Reprise 2
^{^[tv]} Tracks 1−3 and 9−11 are sourced directly from their respective mono television soundtracks

== Personnel ==
Jazz Impressions of A Boy Named Charlie Brown – Vince Guaraldi Trio
Recorded on May 26, September 11, and October 26, 1964

- Vince Guaraldi – piano, arranger
- Monty Budwig – double bass
- Colin Bailey – drums

Camptown Races and Track Meet – Vince Guaraldi Trio
Recorded on July 29, 1965

- Vince Guaraldi – piano, arranger ("Track Meet")
- Fred Marshall - double bass (“Track Meet”)
- Jerry Granelli - drums (“Track Meet”)
- Eddie Duran - guitar (“Track Meet”)
- Bill Fitch – congas ("Camptown Races")
- Benny Velarde – timbales ("Camptown Races")

A Charlie Brown Christmas – Vince Guaraldi Trio
Recorded on October 26, 1964 ("Linus and Lucy") and September 17 – October 28, 1965

- Vince Guaraldi – piano, arranger
- Fred Marshall – double bass ("Christmas Time Is Here")
- Monty Budwig – double bass ("Linus and Lucy")
- Jerry Granelli – drums ("Christmas Time Is Here")
- Colin Bailey – drums ("Linus and Lucy")

Charlie Brown's All-Stars! – Vince Guaraldi Sextet
Recorded on May 13, 1966

- Vince Guaraldi – piano, arranger
- Eugene “Puzzy” Firth - bass
- Frank Snow - trumpet
- John Coppola - trumpet
- Eddie Duran - guitar
- Lee Charlton - drums

It's the Great Pumpkin, Charlie Brown – Vince Guaraldi Sextet
Recorded on October 4, 1966

- Vince Guaraldi – piano, celesta, arranger
- Emmanuel Klein – trumpet
- John Gray – guitar
- Ronald Lang – woodwinds
- Monty Budwig – double bass
- Colin Bailey – drums

A Charlie Brown Thanksgiving – Vince Guaraldi Quintet
Recorded on August 20, 22, September 4, and October 1, 1973

- Vince Guaraldi – acoustic piano, electric keyboards, vocals, guitars
- Seward McCain – electric bass
- Tom Harrell – trumpet
- Chuck Bennett – trombone
- Mike Clark – drums

Be My Valentine, Charlie Brown – Vince Guaraldi Trio
Recorded on December 9, 17, 18, 23, and 30, 1974

- Vince Guaraldi – acoustic piano, electric keyboards, guitars
- Seward McCain – electric bass
- Vince Lateano – drums

== See also ==
- Vince Guaraldi discography
- List of songs recorded by Vince Guaraldi
- List of cover versions of Vince Guaraldi songs
- Lee Mendelson Film Productions
