= Skating (song) =

Instrumental by Vince Guaraldi

from the album A Charlie Brown Christmas
- Released: December 1965
- Recorded: September 17, 1965
- Studio: Fantasy Studios, Berkeley, California
- Genre: Jazz waltz
- Length: 2:27
- Label: Fantasy
- Composer: Vince Guaraldi

Audio
- "Skating" on YouTube

"Skating" is an instrumental composition by American pianist Vince Guaraldi, written for the 1965 television special A Charlie Brown Christmas and released on its soundtrack album. A jazz waltz, it accompanies a scene in which the children catch snowflakes on their tongues.

The piece remains a recurring Christmas selection. Writing for The New Yorker in 2017, Ethan Iverson included it among the soundtrack tracks in regular holiday rotation.

== Background and recording ==
"Skating" was composed from producer Lee Mendelson's outline for the special, with its cascading piano runs suggest children skating on a frozen pond.

Guaraldi recorded "Skating" at Fantasy Studios in San Francisco in September 1965, accompanied by bassist Fred Marshall and drummer Jerry Granelli. He worked on the piano solo and descending runs over several takes. The album version fades out approximately twelve seconds before the performance ends, leaving out the closing chords. The 2022 Super Deluxe edition includes recordings from the September 17 and September 22 sessions. The soundtrack's 2022 Super Deluxe edition includes outtakes recorded during the September 17 and 22 sessions.

Guaraldi also performed "Skating" with his quartet featuring guitarist Bola Sete during an October 1965 tour of California colleges and universities.

== Composition and musical structure ==
"Skating" is in C major and 3/4 time. Pianist George Winston noted its contrasting sections and left-hand bass patterns. Iverson described the piano writing as "rolling thirds in waltz time". In a study of Guaraldi's playing, Alec Villars Huntley observed that the pianist's left-hand bass notes during the solo differ from those played by the bassist. The eight-bar excerpt reproduced in the study repeats the progression C–F–G–F.

== Reception and legacy ==
Writing for All About Jazz, Florence Wetzel described "Skating" as conveying the pleasure of moving across the ice. Alexis Petridis of The Guardian called it "straightforwardly sublime", praising its descending melody. Iverson was less enthusiastic, calling the piece "slightly bland". Boise State Public Radio identified it as a holiday classic in its description of the 2025 special Vince Guaraldi's Christmas Gift to Jazz.

Later Christmas concerts have featured the composition. Tony Frankel praised David Benoit's trio performance in a 2015 review, while SFJAZZ presented a performance by Cyrus Chestnut's trio during its 2024 holiday season.

== Later recordings and film appearances ==
Guaraldi revisited the piece for A Boy Named Charlie Brown (1969), which added orchestral music to his jazz score. The skating sequence combines the song with John Scott Trotter's "Blue Puck" before returning to "Skating (Snoopy on Ice)".

The original 1965 recording has appeared on various compilations, including The Definitive Vince Guaraldi (2009). Reviewing the album for All About Jazz, David Rickert named "Skating" among Guaraldi's classic Peanuts compositions. The recording was also featured during the opening ice skating sequence in The Peanuts Movie (2015).

Winston recorded "Skating" for his Guaraldi tribute album Linus and Lucy: The Music of Vince Guaraldi (1996). Norman Brown recorded a guitar interpretation for 40 Years: A Charlie Brown Christmas (2005). Reviewing that album, Woodrow Wilkins compared Brown's playing to George Benson's style and noted his scat singing over the melody.

== See also ==
- "Linus and Lucy"
- Vince Guaraldi discography
- List of songs recorded by Vince Guaraldi
- List of cover versions of Vince Guaraldi songs
- Lee Mendelson Film Productions
