= Joe Cool's Blues =

Studio album by Wynton Marsalis and Ellis Marsalis
- Released: April 18, 1995
- Recorded: April 12, June 14, August 25, 1994
- Genre: Jazz
- Length: 65:19
- Label: Columbia
- Producers: George Butler, Delfeayo Marsalis

Wynton Marsalis chronology
Griot New York (1995)	Joe Cool's Blues (1995)	In Gabriel's Garden (1996)

Ellis Marsalis, Jr. chronology
Whistle Stop (1994)	Joe Cool's Blues (1995)	A Night at Snug Harbor, New Orleans (1995)

Professional ratings
Review scores
Source	Rating
AllMusic	4/5 stars
The Penguin Guide to Jazz Recordings	3.5/4 stars

Joe Cool's Blues is an album by jazz trumpeter Wynton Marsalis and his father Ellis Marsalis that was released in 1995. The album reached a peak position of No. 3 on Billboard's Top Jazz Albums chart.

The album consists of a series of songs inspired by the Peanuts comic strip and television specials. Half of the songs are cover versions of pieces by Vince Guaraldi, who composed for the Peanuts franchise from 1965 until his death in 1976; the remainder are original compositions by Wynton Marsalis.

== Track listing ==
All tracks are written by Wynton Marsalis, except where noted.

No.	Title	Writer(s)	Performed by	Length
1.	"Linus and Lucy"	Vince Guaraldi	Wynton Marsalis Septet	4:39
2.	"Buggy Ride"		Wynton Marsalis Septet	4:35
3.	"Christmas Is Coming" (mistitled "Peppermint Patty")	Guaraldi	Ellis Marsalis Trio	3:17
4.	"On Peanuts Playground"		Wynton Marsalis Septet	4:51
5.	"Oh Good Grief!"	Guaraldi; Lee Mendelson	Ellis Marsalis Trio	4:58
6.	"Wright Brothers Rag"		Wynton Marsalis Septet	4:43
7.	"Charlie Brown Theme"	Guaraldi; Mendelson	Ellis Marsalis Trio	4:24
8.	"Little Red-Haired Girl"		Wynton Marsalis Septet	4:44
9.	"Pebble Beach"	Guaraldi	Ellis Marsalis Trio	4:37
10.	"Snoopy and Woodstock"		Wynton Marsalis Septet	6:34
11.	"Little Birdie"	Guaraldi	Ellis Marsalis Trio	4:22
12.	"Why, Charlie Brown"		Wynton Marsalis Septet	4:06
13.	"Joe Cool's Blues (Snoopy's Return)"		Wynton Marsalis Septet	9:29
Total length:				65:19

== Personnel ==
Wynton Marsalis Septet

- Wynton Marsalis – trumpet
- Eric Reed – piano
- Wessell Anderson – soprano and alto saxophones
- Victor Goines – tenor saxophone, clarinet
- Wycliffe Gordon – trombone
- Ben Wolfe – double bass, bass guitar
- Herlin Riley – drums

Ellis Marsalis Trio

- Ellis Marsalis – piano
- Reginald Veal – bass
- Martin Butler – drums

Additional personnel

- Branford Marsalis – tenor saxophone ("Little Birdie")
- Chuck Findley – trumpet ("Little Birdie")
- Tom Peterson – baritone saxophone ("Little Birdie")
- Germaine Bazzle – vocals ("Little Birdie")
- George Butler – executive producer
- Delfeayo Marsalis – trombone ("Little Birdie"), producer, mixing, mastering
- Stanley Crouch – liner notes
