= Happy Anniversary, Charlie Brown! =

Studio album by Various Artists
- Released: October 17, 1989
- Genres: Jazz, Easy Listening, New-age, Blues, Soundtrack
- Length: 48:03
- Label: GRP Records
- Producer: Michael Abene

Professional ratings
Review scores
Source	Rating
AllMusic	3/5 stars

Happy Anniversary, Charlie Brown! is a 1989 album commemorating the 40th anniversary of the comic strip Peanuts and released by GRP Records. The album contains versions of music and songs from the television specials originally performed by Vince Guaraldi, as well as some original compositions, performed by various jazz artists such as Dave Brubeck, David Benoit, Dave Grusin, Lee Ritenour and Kenny G.

The album was released to coincide with the television documentary You Don't Look 40, Charlie Brown.

== Track listing ==
All tracks are written by Vince Guaraldi, except where noted.

No.	Title	Writer(s)	Performed by	Length
1.	"Linus and Lucy"		David Benoit	3:39
2.	"Joe Cool"	Guaraldi; Desirée Goyette	B.B. King	3:50
3.	"History Lesson"	Dave Grusin	Dave Grusin	4:52
4.	"The Great Pumpkin Waltz"		Chick Corea	5:34
5.	"Little Birdie"		Joe Williams	3:41
6.	"Rain, Rain, Go Away"		Gerry Mulligan	4:28
7.	"Breadline Blues"	Grusin	Kenny G	4:10
8.	"Red Baron"		Lee Ritenour	3:57
9.	"Christmas Time Is Here"	Guaraldi; Lee Mendelson	Patti Austin	3:27
10.	"Charlie Brown Theme"	Guaraldi; Mendelson	Amani A. W.-Murray	3:39
11.	"Benjamin"	Dave Brubeck	Dave Brubeck	3:48
12.	"Linus and Lucy" (reprise with Peanuts Gang)		Benoit (with the Peanuts Gang)	3:04
Total length:				48:03

== Voices ==
- Charlie Brown: Kaleb Henley
- Linus: Brandon Stewart
- Lucy Van Pelt: Jennifer Banko
- Peppermint Patty: Nichole Buda

== Charts ==
Chart (1989)	Peak position
Billboard Contemporary Jazz Albums	1
US Top Pop Albums (Billboard)	65
