= From All Sides =

Studio album by Vince Guaraldi and Bola Sete
- Released: February 1965
- Genres: Latin jazz; Bossa nova
- Length: 38:12
- Label: Fantasy

Vince Guaraldi chronology
Jazz Impressions of A Boy Named Charlie Brown (1964)	From All Sides (1965)	At Grace Cathedral (1965)

Bola Sete chronology
Tour de Force (1963)	From All Sides (1964)	The Incomparable Bola Sete (1964)

From All Sides is a collaboration between the American pianist Vince Guaraldi and the Brazilian guitarist Bola Sete. Released in February 1965 by Fantasy Records, it was Guaraldi's seventh studio album and the second of three collaborations with Sete.

== Recording and background ==
From All Sides was recorded in late 1964 during a period of increased collaboration between pianist Vince Guaraldi and guitarist Bola Sete. The two artists had developed a strong musical rapport while performing regularly at Trois Couleurs, a nightclub in San Francisco. Guaraldi's trio had a sixteen-week residency, with Sete joining them for the final twelve weeks. This extended engagement helped establish the interplay that would shape the studio sessions for the album.

The record features a blend of Latin jazz, bossa nova, and American jazz idioms, reflecting both Guaraldi's West Coast jazz background and Sete's Brazilian heritage. Several compositions on the album were either reworkings of previously recorded material or later repurposed in future projects. "Ginza Samba," originally titled "Ginza", was first recorded by Guaraldi for his debut album Modern Music from San Francisco (1956). "Menino Pequeno da Bateria", a gentle bossa nova reinterpretation of "The Little Drummer Boy", would later appear in A Charlie Brown Christmas as "My Little Drum". Additionally, "Choro" is based on the first theme of Wolfgang Amadeus Mozart's Symphony No. 40 in G minor, K. 550, I. Molto allegro which Guaraldi later adapted for the Peanuts television special He's Your Dog, Charlie Brown (1968) under the title "Schroeder's Wolfgang".

"The Ballad of Pancho Villa" is an original composition characterized by rhythmic intensity and melodic phrasing that anticipate later Guaraldi Peanuts works such as "Linus and Lucy" and "Christmas Is Coming". "Little Fishes", co-written by Sete and Eva Konrad, merges classical sensibilities with a mid-tempo jazz framework. The album closes with a Latin arrangement of the pop standard "A Taste of Honey".

Following the album's release in February 1965, Guaraldi and Sete remained visible on the Northern California music scene. They made two appearances on The Dick Stewart Show, a local television program, and performed at various venues including the International House and Bear's Lair Cabaret at the University of California, Berkeley. They also participated in civic benefits and political fundraisers. A tour of Brazil had been planned to commemorate the 400th anniversary of Rio de Janeiro but was canceled due to logistical constraints and low ticket demand.

Although Billboard praised the album for its integration of Latin and American jazz forms and selected it as a "Jazz Special Merit Pick", the collaboration was short-lived. Internal differences led to the departure of drummer Jerry Granelli and bassist Fred Marshall shortly after the album's release.

== Release and reception ==
Professional ratings
Review scores
Source	Rating
Allmusic	3/5 stars
The Rolling Stone Jazz Record Guide	3/5 stars
Five Cents Please	3/5 stars
The Penguin Guide to Jazz Recordings	2.5/4 stars
Billboard	Favorable

From All Sides was met with generally favorable critical notice upon its release. In a "Jazz Special Merit" review, Billboard commended the collaboration between Vince Guaraldi and Bola Sete for its synthesis of Latin and American jazz idioms, remarking that the two musicians performed with such cohesion that the distinction between piano and guitar was often imperceptible.

Cash Box described the record as "glowing with the fiery Brazilian sound of Bola Sete" while noting that Guaraldi's playing added "sparkling" energy to the set. A contemporaneous review in Down Beat by John A. Tynan emphasized the pair's musical rapport and "unity of feeling," commending their rhythm section and the polished pacing of their live performances. Tynan observed that Guaraldi and Sete presented their material with both technical precision and an engaging sense of showmanship.

In retrospective assessments, critic Richard S. Ginell of AllMusic rated the album three out of five stars, describing it as an "attractive, mostly bossa nova session" that, while less inventive than some of Guaraldi's other collaborations with Sete, remained accessible and appealing to listeners.

Jazz historian Ted Gioia later characterized the Guaraldi–Sete partnership as one marked by "extraordinary musical chemistry." Writing in 2021, Gioia noted that their three Fantasy albums recorded between 1963 and 1965 represented some of the era's most effective examples of Brazilian–American jazz fusion and captured a spirit of spontaneity that endured in later evaluations.

A 2023 profile of Sete in The Guardian by Beatriz Miranda similarly highlighted the critical standing achieved during this period. Miranda reported that Sete was named "Guitarist of the Year" by Down Beat and was described by critic Leonard Feather as "one of the most innovative and eclectic guitarists in jazz history" in his Encyclopedia of Jazz in the Sixties. The article observed that works such as From All Sides reinforced Sete's long‑term credibility within the jazz community, distancing him from the transient bossa nova fad of the mid‑1960s.

Other retrospective sources have been moderately favorable. The Rolling Stone Jazz Record Guide assigned the album three out of five stars, while The Penguin Guide to Jazz Recordings rated it two and a half stars.

In 1998, the album was remastered by Phil De Lancie and issued on CD for the first time.

== Track listing ==
All tracks written by Vince Guaraldi, except where noted.

Side One
No.	Title	Writer(s)	Length
1.	"Choro"		4:55
2.	"Menino Pequeno da Bateria"		4:22
3.	"Ginza Samba"		5:26
4.	"The Girl from Ipanema"	Antônio Carlos Jobim; Vinícius de Moraes	5:19

Side Two
No.	Title	Writer(s)	Length
5.	"A Taste of Honey"	Ric Marlow; Bobby Scott	6:52
6.	"Ballad of Pancho Villa"		2:29
7.	"Little Fishes"	Eva Konrad Konrad; Bola Sete	4:35
8.	"Mambeando"	Bola Sete	4:14
Total length:			38:12

== Personnel ==
Credits adapted from 1965 vinyl release.

- Bola Sete – guitar

Vince Guaraldi Trio

- Vince Guaraldi – piano
- Fred Marshall – double bass (Tracks 1, 2, 5–7)
- Monty Budwig – double bass (Tracks 3, 4, 8)
- Jerry Granelli – drums (Tracks 1, 2, 5–7)
- Nick Martinez – drums (Tracks 3, 4, 8)

Additional

- Ralph J. Gleason – liner notes

== Release history ==
Country	Date	Label	Format	Catalogue number
United States	February 1965	Fantasy	Mono LP	3362
United States	February 1965	Fantasy	Stereo LP	8362
United States	August 18, 1998	Original Jazz Classics	CD (remastered)	OJCCD-989-2
United States	February 27, 2026	Craft Recordings	180-gram LP (remastered)	

== See also ==
- Vince Guaraldi discography
- List of songs recorded by Vince Guaraldi
- List of cover versions of Vince Guaraldi songs
- Lee Mendelson Film Productions
