= Vince Guaraldi with the San Francisco Boys Chorus =

Studio album by Vince Guaraldi
- Released: December 1967
- Recorded: Late summer-early autumn 1967
- Genre: Jazz
- Length: 27:46 (original 1967 release); 34:05 (CD release)
- Labels: D&D
- Producer: Vince Guaraldi

Vince Guaraldi chronology
Live at El Matador (1966)	Vince Guaraldi with the San Francisco Boys Chorus (1967)	Oh Good Grief! (1968)

Singles from Vince Guaraldi with the San Francisco Boys Chorus
- 1. "Eleanor Rigby" Released: October 1967; 2. "Blowin' in the Wind" Released: December 1967

Professional ratings
Review scores
Source	Rating
All About Jazz	3/5 stars
Five Cents Please	4/5 stars

Vince Guaraldi with the San Francisco Boys Chorus is an album collaboration between American jazz pianist Vince Guaraldi and the San Francisco Boys Chorus released in December 1967. It was Guaraldi's ninth studio album and the first to be released on his D&D record label (the only one during his lifetime), named for the first initials of his two children, David and Dia.

== Background ==
Due to the then-ongoing legal dispute with Fantasy Records that began in early 1966, Guaraldi could not secure new recording contracts with other labels. He created his own record label, D&D Records, named after his children, David and Dia. The first release under this label was a single featuring a cover of The Beatles' "Eleanor Rigby," backed by a complete version of "Peppermint Patty," a song from the Peanuts television special, You're in Love, Charlie Brown (1967). Guaraldi intentionally chose the latter track, recognizing that the popularity of his Peanuts compositions would bolster the success of D&D's inaugural release.

Guaraldi's interest in working with young voices was evident in his early collaborations with the San Francisco Boys Chorus. As he explained, "I dig working with kids. They have a sound — a timbre — that's really better than adults doing the same stuff. It's the simplicity that counts. No filigree." This collaboration was first showcased at the Stern Grove Midsummer Music Festival on July 23, 1967. Guaraldi's trio, with Vince Lateano on drums, performed alongside the 60-member Boys Chorus, under the direction of Donald Cobb. While Guaraldi praised the purity and youthful energy of the chorus, critical reception was mixed, with some commentators suggesting that the performance deviated from the jazz festival's core focus and resembled a glee club performance instead.

== Recording ==
Following the festival, Guaraldi began recording additional tracks for what would become Vince Guaraldi with the San Francisco Boys Chorus at San Francisco's Coast Recorders studio. He decided to evenly divide the album's content between traditional jazz trio arrangements and collaborations with the Boys Chorus. Guaraldi took full control of the production process, overseeing every detail of the sessions, from arranging to directing. His jazz trio, with Eddie Duran on guitar, Kelly Bryan and Roland Haynes on bass, and John Rae on drums, recorded four instrumental tracks, including the melancholic cover of "Eleanor Rigby" and two tracks from Guaraldi's previous collaboration with Lee Mendelson.

The Boys Chorus contributed to four additional tracks, with Tom Beeson on bass and Lee Charlton on drums. Their performance on Bob Dylan's "Blowin' in the Wind" involved singing the lyrics, while their participation on other tracks provided vocal shading, echoing key phrases and adding atmospheric layers to the compositions. The blend of jazz and choral arrangements required careful orchestration, posing both artistic and technical challenges.

The recording process was a complex and, at times, frustrating endeavor. According to former chorister Steve Rubardt, the sessions were marred by delays and technical difficulties, partly stemming from Guaraldi's limited experience directing such a large and diverse group. Additionally, the balance between the jazz trio and the chorus required meticulous attention, which often slowed progress.

Guaraldi also faced financial constraints in producing the album, leading him to make the pragmatic decision to release the album in mono format as a cost-saving measure, despite the music industry's broader transition to stereo recording.

== Release ==
D&D Records released Vince Guaraldi with the San Francisco Boys Chorus in December 1967. However, the album encountered significant challenges in reaching a wider audience. Distribution limitations, coupled with minimal promotional support, hindered its commercial success. The album's hybrid nature, blending jazz with choral arrangements, also proved difficult for some listeners to embrace. Though it attracted some local attention, the album failed to achieve substantial commercial traction, and D&D did not release further albums.

== Critical reception ==
Guaraldi historian Derrick Bang noted that the album "has something of an identity crisis; although all eight cuts are presented in the breezy shuffle style that made [Guaraldi] famous, half the tracks employ the San Francisco Boys Chorus for background coloring, while the others are conventional instrumentals with various quartets."

== Track listing ==
=== Original 1967 vinyl release ===
All tracks are written by Vince Guaraldi, except where noted

Side one
No.	Title	Writer(s)	Notes	Length
1.	"Blowin' in the Wind"	Bob Dylan		3:23
2.	"Think Drink"	Richard Boyell		2:52
3.	"Theme to Grace"		original version on At Grace Cathedral (1965)	3:31
4.	"Spice Island Theme"			2:51

Side two
No.	Title	Writer(s)	Notes	Length
5.	"Monterey"			3:06
6.	"Eleanor Rigby"	John Lennon; Paul McCartney		3:43
7.	"My Little Drum"		original version on A Charlie Brown Christmas (1965)	3:57
8.	"Newport Theme"			4:23
Total length:				27:46

=== 2005 CD release ===
Bonus tracks
No.	Title	Notes	Length
9.	"Peppermint Patty"	B-side of "Eleanor Rigby" single; featured in the Peanuts television special You're in Love, Charlie Brown (1967)	2:25
10.	"Newport Theme" (alternate take)	previously unreleased	3:54
Total length:			34:05

== Personnel ==
Credits adapted from 2005 CD liner notes.

- Vince Guaraldi – piano
- Eddie Duran – guitar (Tracks 2, 4, 6, 8, 10)
- Tom Beeson – double bass (Tracks 1, 3, 5, 7)
- Kelly Bryan – double bass (Tracks 4, 6, 8, 10)
- Roland Haynes – double bass (Track 2)
- Lee Charlton – drums (Tracks 1, 3, 5, 7)
- John Rae – drums (Tracks 2, 4, 6, 8, 10)
- San Francisco Boys Chorus – vocals (Tracks 1, 3, 5, 7)

Vince Guaraldi Consort (aka The Vince Guaraldi Sextet)

- Vince Guaraldi – piano (Track 9)
- John Gray – guitar (Track 9)
- Frank Rosolino – trombone (Track 9)
- Ronald Lang – woodwinds (Track 9)
- Monty Budwig – double bass (Track 9)
- John Rae – drums (Track 9)
- John Scott Trotter – arranger and conductor (Track 9)

== See also ==
- Vince Guaraldi discography
- List of songs recorded by Vince Guaraldi
- List of cover versions of Vince Guaraldi songs
- Lee Mendelson Film Productions
