= Doc Watkins =

American pianist and singer

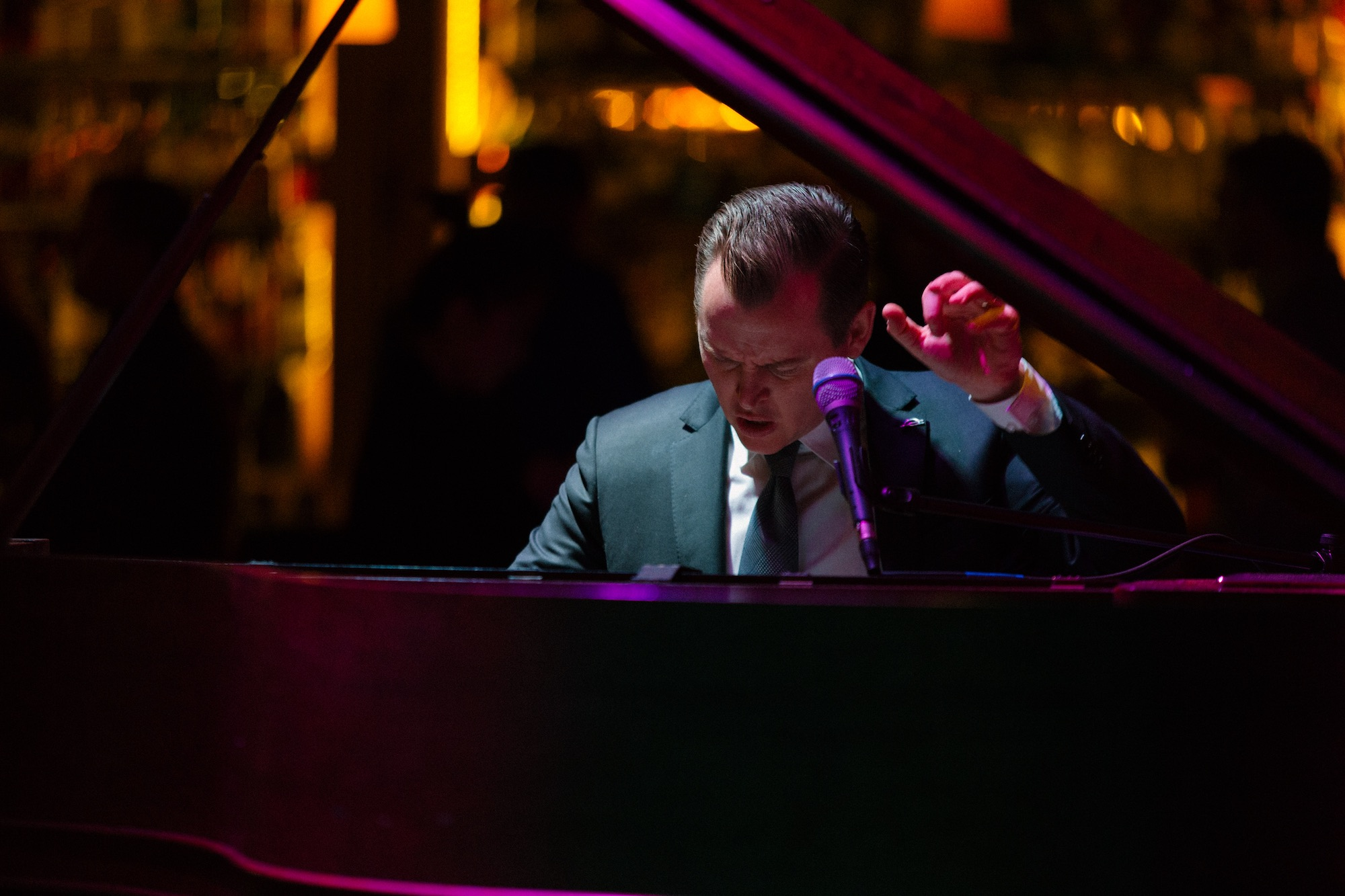

Background information
- Born: June 11, 1981 (age 45)
- Genres: Jazz, Texas swing
- Occupations: Singer; Pianist; Composer; Producer; Band leader; Radio Host
- Instruments: Vocals, piano
- Website: docwatkins.com

Brent "Doc" Watkins (born June 11, 1981) is an American pianist and singer based in San Antonio, Texas. He is the owner and founder of Jazz, TX, a restaurant and performance venue located in the Historic Pearl Brewery Complex in San Antonio. He performs there regularly with his Orchestra. In 2024, Watkins announced he would be opening a new jazz club called Doc's in the Montrose neighborhood of Houston at the former Historic Tower Theatre. He is the co-creator and co-host of the radio program Live at Jazz, TX, which is syndicated through Texas Public Radio. Live at Jazz, TX has featured interviews and performances by notable artists such as Kenny Garrett, Jane Monheit, Kevin Eubanks, and Marcia Ball.

Watkins was born and raised in Oregon and moved to Austin, Texas in 2003, where he earned a master's degree and PhD in music from the University of Texas. In 2006 he relocated to San Antonio and began performing regularly at local venues on the San Antonio Riverwalk. In January 2014, he performed with his Jazz Trio at New York City's Carnegie Hall. In 2016, Watkins opened his own venue, Jazz, TX, where he performs regularly with his band. He released a book in 2026 telling the story of Jazz, TX, and marking the club's 10th anniversary.

In 2020, Watkins hosted and co-produced The Doc Watkins Show, a live stream television program that ran for 45 episodes during the COVID-19 pandemic. The show featured Watkins and his band, with remote guest appearances from Kevin Eubanks, Jane Monheit, Alan Havey, Brent Barry, Champian Fulton, Jerry Weldon, Mayor Ron Nirenberg and others. The show was awarded "Best Live Stream Experience" by San Antonio Magazine in 2021.

Watkins has performed with Herlin Riley, Kevin Eubanks, Butch Miles, Jim Cullum, Ephraim Owens, Stan Mark, Landau Eugene Murphy Jr, Bijon Watson, Leon Hughes, and Renee Olstead. He currently resides in San Antonio with his wife Jessica and their four children.

== Discography ==
=== Albums ===
- 2005 – The Classical Concert
- 2011 – Live from Bohanan's
- 2014 – The Outlaw
- 2015 – A Willie Nelson Tribute
- 2015 – Swinging from San Antonio
- 2015 – Doc Watkins and his Orchestra (EP)
- 2017 – Jazz, TX
- 2018 – Christmas in Jazz, TX
- 2019 – Songs of 2019
- 2022 – The Music of A Charlie Brown Christmas
