= 40 Years: A Charlie Brown Christmas =

Compilation album by David Benoit
- Released: October 4, 2005
- Studios: Castle Oaks, Calabasas, California; Oceanway Recording Studios, Hollywood, California; WonderWorld Studio, Los Angeles, California; Paramount Encore Studios, Hollywood, California; Surfboard Studios, Boca Raton, Florida; Tree Sound Studios, Atlanta, Georgia; Backroom Studios, Glendale, California
- Genres: Christmas music; Jazz; Soundtrack
- Length: 43:45
- Labels: Peak; Concord
- Producers: David Benoit; Rob Mathes; Keri Lewis; Brian McKnight; Russ Freeman

Professional ratings
Review scores
Source	Rating
AllMusic	3.5/5 stars
All About Jazz	5/5 stars
Five Cents Please	Mediocre

40 Years: A Charlie Brown Christmas is a compilation album released in the U.S. by Peak Records in October 2005. The album is a tribute to the soundtrack album A Charlie Brown Christmas released by American jazz pianist Vince Guaraldi (credited to the Vince Guaraldi Trio) in December 1965.

== Reception ==
Rob Theakston of AllMusic noted that the original soundtrack recording has become "a cornerstone for jazz orientation and an essential holiday remedy for the run-of-the-mill-predictable contemporary favorites." He added that the musicians assembled for this tribute album represent a "veritable who's who of adult contemporary and jazz performers," and that the resulting music is "very warm sounding, heavily polished" and "well-played".

Guaraldi historian Derrick Bang noted that the album is "quite nice," adding that David Benoit's rendition of "Christmas Is Coming" is a "punchy, swinging cover," while Dave Koz's version of "Linus and Lucy" is "equally lively."

All About Jazz critic Woodrow Wilkins called the album a "jazz lover's delight."

== Track listing ==
All tracks are written by Vince Guaraldi, except where noted.

Standard edition
No.	Title	Writer(s)	Performer	Length
1.	"Christmas Is Coming"		David Benoit	2:54
2.	"Just Like Me"	David Benoit; Lee Mendelson	Vanessa Williams	4:12
3.	"Linus and Lucy"		Dave Koz	4:02
4.	"It's the Most Wonderful Time of the Year"	Edward Pola; George Wyle	Toni Braxton	4:17
5.	"My Little Drum"		Rick Braun	3:28
6.	"Skating"		Norman Brown	4:01
7.	"Christmas Time Is Here" (vocal)	Vince Guaraldi; Lee Mendelson	Brian McKnight	4:25
8.	"O Tannenbaum"	Ernst Anschütz	Gerald Albright	3:53
9.	"Red Baron"		The Rippingtons	4:10
10.	"The Christmas Song"	Mel Tormé; Robert Wells	Chaka Khan	4:03
11.	"Für Elise"	Ludwig van Beethoven	David Benoit	1:07
12.	"Christmas Time Is Here" (instrumental)		Eric Marienthal	3:13

Target exclusive
No.	Title	Writer(s)	Performer	Length
13.	"Charlie Brown Theme"	Vince Guaraldi; Lee Mendelson	Wayman Tisdale
14.	"Hark! The Herald Angels Sing"	Felix Mendelssohn; Charles Wesley	LaToya London

== Session information ==
Credits adapted from CD liner notes.

"Christmas Is Coming"

- Written by Vince Guaraldi
- Piano, arranger: David Benoit
- Drums: Vinnie Colaiuta
- Cello: Dan Smith, Larry Corbett
- Concert master: Joel Derouin
- Contractor: Suzie Katayama
- Copyist: Anna Stromberg, Eric Stonerook, Jenis Stonerook, William Stromberg
- Percussion: Luis Conte
- Trombone: Steven Holtman
- Trumpet: Rick Baptist, Wayne Bergeron
- Viola: Carole Mukogawa, Denyse Buffum
- Violin: Haim Shtrum, John Wittenberg, Julian Hallmark, Laurence Greenfield, Ruth Bruegger

"Just Like Me"

- Written by David Benoit, Lee Mendelson
- Piano, bells, arranger: David Benoit
- Drums: Vinnie Colaiuta
- Vocals: Vanessa Williams
- Cello: Dan Smith, Larry Corbett, Rudolph Stein
- Concert master: Joel Derouin
- Contractor: Suzie Katayama
- Copyist: Caryn Rasmussen, Scott McRae-Capehart, Suzie Katayama
- Engineer (vocals): Jan Folkson
- Producer (vocals): Rob Mathes
- Viola: Carole Mukogawa, Denyse Buffum, Karen Van Sant
- Violin: Robert Peterson, Haim Shtrum, John Wittenberg, Julian Hallmark, Laurence Greenfield, Norman Hughes, Ruth Bruegger

"Linus and Lucy"

- Written by Vince Guaraldi
- Piano, synthesizer: David Benoit
- Guitar: Tony Maiden
- Electric bass: Alex Al
- Alto Saxophone: Dave Koz
- Drums: Vinnie Colaiuta
- Percussion: Luis Conte

"It's the Most Wonderful Time of the Year"

- Written by Edward Pola, George Wyle
- Vocals: Toni Braxton
- Piano, electric piano, synthesizer, arranger: David Benoit
- Guitar: Grant Geissman
- Acoustic bass: Dave Carpenter
- Drums: John Robinson
- Engineer (assistant vocal engineer]: Mack Woodward
- Producer (vocals): Keri Lewis

"My Little Drum"

- Written by Vince Guaraldi
- Electric piano: David Benoit
- Guitar: Tony Maiden
- Electric bass: Alex Al
- Flugelhorn: Rick Braun
- Drums: Vinnie Colaiuta
- Percussion: Luis Conte

"Skating"

- Written by Vince Guaraldi
- Electric piano, arranger: David Benoit
- Guitar: Norman Brown
- Acoustic bass: Alex Al
- Drums: Vinnie Colaiuta

"Christmas Time Is Here"

- Written by Vince Guaraldi, Lee Mendelson
- Vocals, arranger, producer: Brian McKnight
- Piano: David Benoit
- Keyboards: David Nathan
- Guitar: Tyrone Chase
- Bass: Chris Loftlin
- Acoustic bass: Dave Carpenter
- Drums: Prescott Ellison, Peter Erskine
- Engineer: Chris Wood

"O Tannenbaum"

- Written by Ernst Anschütz
- Electric piano, arranger: David Benoit
- Guitar: Tony Maiden
- Electric bass: Alex Al
- Tenor saxophone: Gerald Albright
- Drums: Vinnie Colaiuta
- Percussion: Luis Conte

"Red Baron"

- Written by Vince Guaraldi
- Guitar, keyboards, arranger, producer: Russ Freeman
- Keyboards: Bill Heller
- Saxophone: Eric Marienthal
- Drums: Peter Erskine
- Engineer: Steve Sykes

"The Christmas Song"

- Written by Mel Tormé, Robert Wells
- Vocals: Chaka Khan
- Piano, electric piano, synthesizer, arranger: David Benoit
- Acoustic bass: Dave Carpenter
- Drums: John Robinson
- Percussion: Luis Conte

"Für Elise"

- Written by Ludwig van Beethoven
- Piano: David Benoit

"Christmas Time Is Here" (reprise)

- Written by Vince Guaraldi
- Piano: David Benoit
- Acoustic bass: Dave Carpenter
- Saxophone: Eric Marienthal
- Drums: Peter Erskine

== Additional personnel ==
- Producer: David Benoit (Tracks 1–6, 8, 10–12)
- A&R coordinator: Valerie Ince
- Art direction: Abbey Anna
- Production coordinator: Yvonne Wish
- Design: Andrew Pham
- Engineer (second): Brian Vibberts, George Gumbs, Jeff Wakolbinger, Josh Blanchard
- Engineer (mix): Clark Germain (Tracks 1–8, 10–12)
- Engineer (tracking): Clark Germain (Tracks 1–8, 10–12)
- Executive producer: Andi Howard, Mark Wexler, Ron Moss
- Mixing: WonderWorld Studio, Los Angeles, California
- Mastering: Bernie Grundman Mastering, Hollywood, California
