= Isaiah J. Thompson =

American pianist and composer (born 1997)

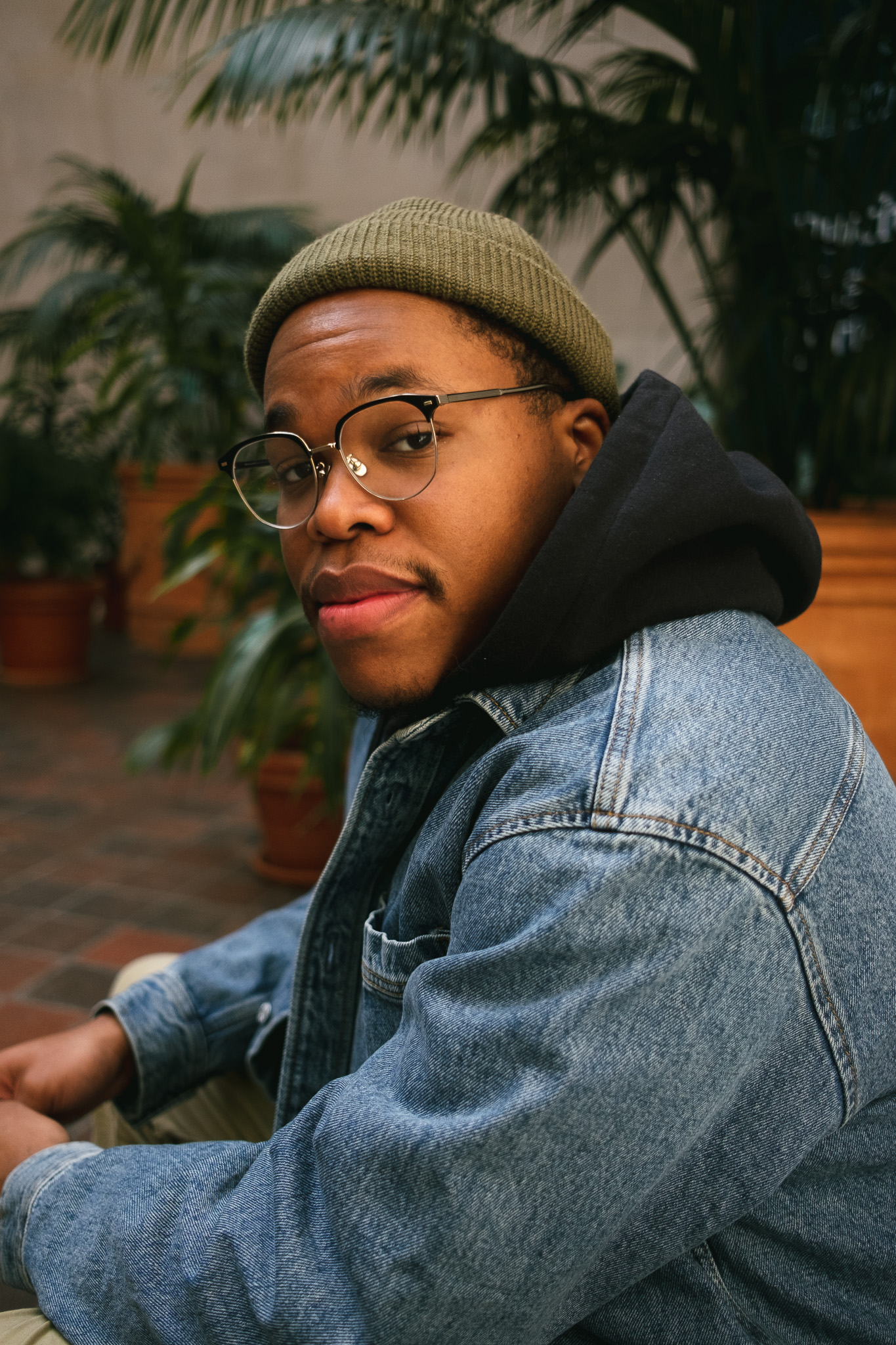
- Thompson in 2023

Background information
- Born: April 29, 1997 (age 29); West Orange, New Jersey, US
- Genres: Jazz
- Occupations: Musician, composer, educator
- Instrument: Piano
- Website: www.isaiahjthompson.com

Isaiah J. Thompson (born April 29, 1997) is an American jazz pianist and composer. In 2023 he won the American Piano Awards.

== Biography ==
Thompson was born on April 29, 1997, in West Orange, New Jersey, and attended the Montclair Kimberley Academy. At an early age, he began studying at the Calderone School of Music and later studied with Jazz House Kids, NJPAC Jazz for Teens and Jazz at Lincoln Center. He received his Bachelor's and Master's of Music degrees from The Juilliard School.

He made his recording debut on the Jazz at Lincoln Center Orchestra with Wynton Marsalis album, Handful of Keys and has since released multiple recordings as a leader. Thompson worked on the Golden Globe nominated soundtrack for Motherless Brooklyn and has performed with major artists including: Christian McBride, Steve Turre, John Pizzarelli, Joe Farnsworth, Buster Williams, Ron Carter, and Catherine Russell.

Thompson is a Steinway & Sons artist.

== Awards and accolades ==
Thompson was a jazz piano winner for the National YoungArts Foundation and received awards at both the Essentially Ellington and Charles Mingus competitions. In 2016, Thompson won the Horace Parlan Talent Award at Jazzhus Montmartre in Copenhagen. In 2018, he was awarded the Lincoln Center Emerging Artist Award and, in the same year, earned second place in the Thelonious Monk Competition. In 2023, he won the American Piano Awards and the Cole Porter Fellowship in Jazz of the American Piano Awards.

== Discography ==
=== As a Leader ===
- Isaiah J. Thompson Trio Live from @exuberance (EP, 2018)
- Isaiah J. Thompson Plays the Music of Buddy Montgomery (WJ3 Records, 2020)
- Composed in Color (Red Records, 2021)
- The Power of the Spirit (Blue Engine Records, 2023)
- A Guaraldi Holiday (The IT Department, LLC, Outside in Music, Jazz Bird Records, 2023)
- The Book of Isaiah: Modern Jazz Ministry (Mack Avenue Records, 2025)

=== As a sideman ===
- Jazz at Lincoln Center Orchestra with Wynton Marsalis, Handful of Keys (Blue Engine Records, 2017)
- Motherless Brooklyn (Film Soundtrack, 2019)
- Willie Jones III, Fallen Heroes (WJ3 Records, 2021)
- Compilation, Kimbrough (Newvelle Records, 2021)
- Steve Turre, Generations (Smoke Sessions Records, 2022)
- John Pizzarelli, Stage & Screen (Palmetto, 2023)
- Anthony Hervey, Words From My Horn (Outside in Music, 2023)
