= Cast Your Fate to the Wind =

1962 song by Vince Guaraldi and Carel Werber

- US 7" single

Single by Vince Guaraldi

from the album Jazz Impressions of Black Orpheus
- A-side: "Samba de Orpheus"
- Released: July 18, 1962
- Genre: Jazz
- Length: 2:58
- Label: Fantasy 563X; Vocalion EPV-F.1280
- Songwriter: Vince Guaraldi

Vince Guaraldi singles chronology
"Cast Your Fate to the Wind" (1962)	"Zelao" (1963)

Alternate cover
- UK 7" single cover art

Audio
- "Cast Your Fate to the Wind" on YouTube

"Cast Your Fate to the Wind"

Single by Sounds Orchestral

from the album Cast Your Fate to the Wind
- B-side: "To Wendy with Love"
- Released: October 30, 1964
- Genre: Jazz rock
- Length: 3:00
- Label: Piccadilly (U.K.); Parkway (U.S.)
- Songwriter: Vince Guaraldi
- Producer: John Schroeder

Sounds Orchestral singles chronology
"Cast Your Fate to the Wind" (1964)	"Moonglow" (1965)

"Cast Your Fate to the Wind" is a jazz instrumental composed and recorded by American pianist Vince Guaraldi. Carel Werber later wrote lyrics for the composition. It received the Grammy Award for Best Original Jazz Composition in 1963.

The recording originally appeared on Jazz Impressions of Black Orpheus, an album credited to the Vince Guaraldi Trio and released by Fantasy Records on April 18, 1962.

Fantasy released "Cast Your Fate to the Wind" as the B-side of the bossa nova-influenced "Samba de Orpheus" single. Radio airplay helped the recording reach No. 22 on the Billboard Hot 100 and No. 9 on the Easy Listening chart. Following its commercial success, Fantasy retitled subsequent pressings of Jazz Impressions of Black Orpheus as Cast Your Fate to the Wind.

== Peanuts ==
Peanuts executive producer Lee Mendelson cited "Cast Your Fate to the Wind" as the tune he heard on the radio that prompted him to commission Guaraldi to compose music cues for the 1963 documentary A Boy Named Charlie Brown, which was ultimately not broadcast due to a lack of sponsorship. The resulting album, Jazz Impressions of A Boy Named Charlie Brown, proved to be popular enough to retain Guaraldi's services for A Charlie Brown Christmas. The collaboration between Guaraldi and the entire Peanuts franchise lasted until Guaraldi's death in 1976.

== Cover versions ==
"Cast Your Fate to the Wind" has been covered by many artists in a wide range of genres, including both male and female solo vocalists, pop, folk, and rock groups, as well as many instrumental performers.

=== Instrumental versions ===
- In 1965, the British easy listening group Sounds Orchestral redirected the tune away from the jazz-influenced midsection to more of a nightclub sound and concluded the tune with a short piano section. That version attained No. 5 in the UK, No. 10 on the US Billboard Hot 100 chart, No. 1 on the US Easy Listening chart, and No. 5 on the Canadian AC charts. A 1976 version by Roger Williams reached No. 46 on the Canadian AC charts in 1976.

=== Vocal versions ===
- Mel Torme was the first singer to perform a version of the song with lyrics, with an arrangement by Marty Paich. It was released in March 1963.
- In 1966, North Hollywood singer Shelby Flint released a version of the song which peaked at No. 61 on the Hot 100, No. 11 on the Easy Listening chart, and No. 92 in Canada.

== In film ==
- The Sounds Orchestral version of the song was featured in Good Morning, Vietnam (1987).
- The song was featured in The In Crowd (1988).
- Allen Toussaint's version is played during the credits for the 2013 film The Wolf of Wall Street.
- Allen Toussaint's version was also played during the credits for the 2023 dark romantic comedy film Hit Man.

== Charts ==
Chart (1962)	Peak position
US Billboard Hot 100	22
US Billboard Easy Listening	9

Chart (1965)	Peak position
US Billboard Easy Listening	1

== Personnel ==
Vince Guaraldi Trio

- Vince Guaraldi – piano
- Colin Bailey – drums
- Monty Budwig – double bass

== See also ==
- List of number-one adult contemporary singles of 1965 (U.S.)
- List of jazz standards
