= At Grace Cathedral =

Live album by Vince Guaraldi
- Released: September 1965
- Recorded: May 21, 1965
- Venues: Grace Cathedral, San Francisco, California
- Genres: Jazz; Mass
- Length: 39:11
- Label: Fantasy

Vince Guaraldi chronology
From All Sides (1965)	At Grace Cathedral (1965)	A Charlie Brown Christmas (1965)

Singles from At Grace Cathedral
- 1. "Theme to Grace" Released: 1965

Alternate cover
- Fantasy 1997 CD release cover art

Professional ratings
Review scores
Source	Rating
AllMusic	4.5/5 stars
All About Jazz	5/5 stars
Five Cents Please	4/5 stars
The Penguin Guide to Jazz Recordings	2/4 stars

At Grace Cathedral (also known as Vince Guaraldi at Grace Cathedral and The Grace Cathedral Concert) is a live performance album by jazz pianist Vince Guaraldi, released in the U.S. in September 1965 on Fantasy Records.

The performance was recorded live at Grace Cathedral in San Francisco, California on May 21, 1965. It is considered to be the world's first "jazz mass" presented during a church service. At Grace Cathedral was released on CD in 1997 by Fantasy under the title The Grace Cathedral Concert.

== Background ==
In an effort to make religious worship more approachable during the growing counterculture movement of the 1960s, the Reverend Charles Gompertz approached local jazz pianist Vince Guaraldi to create what he called a "modern setting for the choral Eucharist." Guaraldi spent every Saturday over a period of 18 months rehearsing with the 68-voice St. Paul's Church of San Rafael choir to create a seamless blend of three unique elements for the performance: spoken (or chanted) prayers and greetings, vocals with the choir, and purely instrumental selections.

Guaraldi understood the significance of his performance: "I had one of America's largest cathedrals as a setting, a top choir, and a critical audience that would be more than justified in finding fault. I was in a musical world that had lived with the Eucharist for 500-600 years, and I had to improve and/or update it to 20th-century musical standards. This was the most awesome and challenging thing I had ever attempted."

The album liner notes pointed out that audience members in attendance commented that "Theme For Grace" was reminiscent of supper music. Rev. Gompertz replied, "that's the idea. What does Communion represent but the Last Supper — the last time these men ate together?"

The song titles were chosen by Rev. Gompertz rather than Guaraldi at the behest of Fantasy Record executives. As the religious service was one long, uninterrupted performance, Fantasy asked Gompertz to divide the resulting recording into segments that would make sense in the context of a commercially released album.

Guaraldi recruited several children from the St. Paul's Church of San Rafael choir several months later to record vocals for "Christmas Time Is Here", "My Little Drum" and "Hark! The Herald Angels Sing" for A Charlie Brown Christmas.

== Critical reception ==
In a contemporary review, Time magazine stated that "even as composed by professionals, liturgical jazz is inevitably something of a special taste, and too distracting for the average congregation. Moreover, the uptempo rhythms of modern jazz chafe against the stately language of the Roman Missal or the Book of Common Prayer".

AllMusic critic Richard S. Ginell commented that "Guaraldi's Mass fuses his mainstream and Latin strains comfortably and movingly underneath the plain vanilla Gregorian lines and Anglican plainchant of a 68-voice chorus." Ginell added that "in a year that also saw Duke Ellington, Dave Brubeck and Lalo Schifrin write jazz-based pieces for the church, Vince Guaraldi may have come up with the most effective sacred work of the four."

All About Jazz critic Douglas Payne dubbed At Grace Cathedral "Peanuts Go To Church." Payne added that most songs "employ Guaraldi's knack for pretty, childlike themes — a perfect tone for the material."

== Legacy ==
Guaraldi's jazz-infused performance at Grace Cathedral was considered groundbreaking for its time, being the first instance that a mainstream jazz musician was heard during an American church service.

Several parishes across the United States celebrated the 50th anniversary of the event in 2015. Sacramento, California-based pianist Jim Martinez and his quartet recreated the jazz mass in its entirety at Grace Cathedral on August 15, 2015. The Fair Oaks Presbyterian Church Choir as well as several surviving members of the original St. Paul's Church of San Rafael choir who performed alongside Guaraldi in 1965 performed with Martinez for the event.

The First Presbyterian Church of Clarks Summit, Pennsylvania, led by Rev. Bill Carter, presented a full performance of Guaraldi's Jazz Mass on September 6, 2015, marking its first complete presentation on the East Coast. Carter performed the keyboard parts, joined by the church's adult choir. A second performance was held on August 31, 2025, to mark the Mass's 60th anniversary. Prior to the event, Carter and Guaraldi biographer Derrick Bang appeared on ArtScene, a program from NPR/PBS affiliate WVIA-FM, to discuss the Mass's lasting influence on both jazz and liturgical music.

== Track listing ==
The following track listing is for the original 1965 vinyl release.

All tracks are written by Vince Guaraldi and the Diocese of San Francisco.

Side One
No.	Title	Length
1.	"The Bishop's Greeting" (spoken word by Bishop James Pike)	1:54
2.	"Kyrie Eleison"	2:01
3.	"Come With Us, O Blessed Jesus"	3:07
4.	"Nicene Creed (I Believe)"	2:22
5.	"Come Holy Ghost"	1:45
6.	"Theme to Grace"	4:10
7.	"Sursum Corda and Sanctus"	2:29
8.	"The Lord's Prayer"	1:42
9.	"Agnus Dei (O Lamb Of God)"	1:21

Side Two
No.	Title	Length
10.	"Holy Communion Blues" (instrumental)	11:40
11.	"Adore Devote (Humbly I Adore Thee)"	2:46
12.	"In Remembrance of Me" (instrumental)	1:53
13.	"Gloria in Excelsis"	1:24
14.	"Blessing – Bishop Pike" (spoken word by Bishop James Pike)	0:37
Total length:		39:11

== Personnel ==
Vince Guaraldi Trio

- Vince Guaraldi – piano
- Tom Beeson – double bass
- Lee Charlton – drums

Additional

- St. Paul's Church of San Rafael 68-voice choir – choral chanting
- Barry Mineah – St. Paul's Church of San Rafael choral director
- Reverend David A. Crump – chanted prayers ("Sursum Corda and Sanctus", "The Lord's Prayer"), liner notes
- Reverend Charles Gompertz – liner notes
- Reverend Malcolm Boyd – liner notes
- Paul Frederick Zumsteg – liner notes
- Jim Easton – sound engineer
- Soul S. Weiss – sound engineer

== See also ==
- Vince Guaraldi discography
- List of songs recorded by Vince Guaraldi
- List of cover versions of Vince Guaraldi songs
- Lee Mendelson Film Productions
