= Modern Music from San Francisco =

1956 studio album by various artists

Studio album by Vince Guaraldi Quartet, Ron Crotty Trio and Jerry Dodgion Quartet
- Released: May 16, 1956
- Recorded: August 1955
- Genre: Jazz; bebop
- Length: 44:55
- Label: Fantasy

Vince Guaraldi chronology
Modern Music from San Francisco (1956)	Vince Guaraldi Trio (1956)

Alternate cover
- Fantasy 2001 CD reissue cover art

Professional ratings
Review scores
Source	Rating
AllMusic	3/5 stars
Five Cents Please	3/5 stars

Modern Music from San Francisco is a studio album featuring the Vince Guaraldi Quartet, the Ron Crotty Trio and the Jerry Dodgion Quartet recorded in August 1955 and released on Fantasy Records in May 1956. The record is the first album to feature pianist and future Peanuts composer Vince Guaraldi leading his own quartet rather than augmenting other established groups.

Modern Music from San Francisco was released as a fourteen track reissue, released on CD in 2001 by Fantasy under the name The Jazz Scene: San Francisco, adding several tracks by the Charlie Mariano Sextet.

== Critical reception ==
DownBeat gave the album a 3-star review, and highlighted Dr. Funk: "Guaraldi is a swinging two-hander who plays with a firm touch and good command."

AllMusic critic Scott Yanow noted, "five originals and two standards are performed in fine cool jazz fashion. The music is not essential but is enjoyable and somewhat historical." Derrick Bang, historian and author of Vince Guaraldi at the Piano, cited the track "Ginza" as of great "significance," noting that it became "one of Guaraldi's first anthems: a 'personal standard' that quickly earned a spot in his ongoing repertoire." Bang added that it is "a sassy, fast-paced romp with echoes of Fats Waller's 'Jitterbug Waltz'." Bang also highlighted "Calling Dr. Funk", as "a loose, smoky, mildly dirty blues number that sounds like a theme song: probably not accidental, because the title referenced the nickname—Dr. Funk—by which Guaraldi already was coming to be known."

== Track listing ==
Side one
No.	Title	Writer(s)	Performed by	Length
1.	"Ginza"	Vince Guaraldi	Ron Crotty Trio	4:08
2.	"Miss Jackie's Dish"	Eugene Wright	Jerry Dodgion Quartet	9:08
3.	"The Night We Called It a Day"	Matt Dennis	Ron Crotty Trio	3:45
4.	"The Groove"	Jerry Dodgion	Jerry Dodgion Quartet	5:45

Side two
No.	Title	Writer(s)	Performed by	Length
5.	"Calling Dr. Funk"	Vince Guaraldi	Vince Guaraldi Quartet	6:55
6.	"The Masquerade Is Over"	Allie Wrubel; Herb Magidson	Ron Crotty Trio	6:30
7.	"Between 8th & 10th On Mission Street"	Jerry Dodgion	Vince Guaraldi Quartet	8:44
Total length:				44:55

=== The Jazz Scene: San Francisco ===
1. "Calling Dr. Funk"
2. "Between 8th & 10th On Mission Street"
3. "Ginza"
4. "The Night We Called It A Day"
5. "(I'm Afraid) The Masquerade Is Over"
6. "Miss Jackie's Dish"
7. "The Groove"
8. "Come Rain Or Come Shine" *
9. "My Friend Ethel" *
10. "After Coffee" *
11. "Trouble Is A Man" *
12. "Let's Get Away From It All" *
13. "The Thrill Is Gone" *
14. "The Nymphz" *
- Tracks 8–14 by The Charlie Mariano Sextet

== Personnel ==
Vince Guaraldi Quartet

- Vince Guaraldi – piano, celesta
- Eugene Wright – bass
- John Markham – drums
- Jerry Dodgion – alto saxophone

Ron Crotty Trio

- Ron Crotty – bass
- Eddie Duran – guitar
- Vince Guaraldi – piano, celesta

Jerry Dodgion Quartet

- Jerry Dodgion – alto saxophone
- Sonny Clark – piano
- Eugene Wright – bass
- Lawrence Marable – drums

Additional

- Ralph J. Gleason – liner notes

== Release history ==
Country	Date	Label	Format	Catalogue number
United States	1956	Fantasy	Mono LP, red translucent	3-213
United States	1987	Fantasy/Original Jazz Classics	Mono LP, red translucent, remastered	OJCCD-272, F-3213
