= Oh Good Grief! =

Studio album by Vince Guaraldi
- Released: May 1968
- Recorded: March 22, 1968
- Studios: Golden State Studios, San Francisco, California
- Genres: West Coast jazz; Jazz pop
- Length: 27:31
- Label: Warner Bros.-Seven Arts
- Producer: Vince Guaraldi

Vince Guaraldi chronology
Vince Guaraldi with the San Francisco Boys Chorus (1967)	Oh Good Grief! (1968)	The Eclectic Vince Guaraldi (1969)

Oh Good Grief! is the tenth studio album by Vince Guaraldi, released in the U.S. in May 1968. The album was the artist's first release with Warner Bros.-Seven Arts after leaving Fantasy Records in 1966.

== Background and recording ==
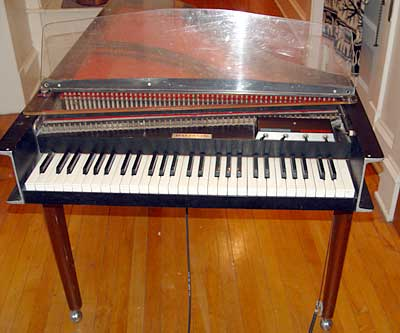
The Baldwin Combo electric harpsichord provides the defining sound of Oh Good Grief!, lending the album its distinctive modern texture.

In early 1968, after the commercial underperformance of his self-released Vince Guaraldi with the San Francisco Boys Chorus on D & D Records, Vince Guaraldi signed a three-album agreement with Warner Bros.-Seven Arts. The first project centered on new studio versions of themes he had composed for the Peanuts animated television specials.

Recording was completed on March 22, 1968, during a single session at Golden State Recorders in San Francisco with Eddie Duran (electric guitar), Stanley Gilbert (bass), and Carl Burnett (drums). The album features acoustic piano alongside overdubbed Baldwin Combo electric harpsichord, with the two keyboards alternating between lead and accompaniment roles. Two tracks, "Great Pumpkin Waltz" and "Rain, Rain Go Away," do not feature harpsichord.

== Release history ==
Oh Good Grief! was first released in May 1968 by Warner Bros.–Seven Arts on standard black vinyl.

On July 6, 2018, Omnivore Recordings issued a special 50th anniversary release featuring translucent red vinyl pressed at RTI, housed in a tip-on jacket and mastered by Kevin Gray. This edition featured remastered audio, original artwork and printed inserts. The album was simultaneously included in The Complete Warner Bros.–Seven Arts Recordings two‑CD collection, distributed across the US, Europe, and Japan.

To mark the 75th anniversary of the Peanuts franchise, Omnivore released a limited commemorative opaque yellow vinyl LP and a stand-alone CD on May 30, 2025, in the US, select EU retailers, and Australia.

== Reception ==
Professional ratings
Review scores
Source	Rating
AllMusic	3.5/5 stars
The Rolling Stone Jazz Record Guide	3/5 stars
Five Cents Please	5/5 stars

=== Commercial performance ===
Oh Good Grief! charted on the Billboard Best Selling Jazz LPs chart for two consecutive weeks starting the week of June 29, 1968, where it peaked at No. 20.

=== Critical reception ===
AllMusic critic Richard S. Ginell noted Guaraldi's use of electric harpsichord throughout the album, commenting that while it added a layered, experimental sound, it occasionally overshadowed the quartet's swing. Nevertheless, he praised the compositions as "marvelous" and emphasized the rarity and value of Guaraldi's Peanuts material. Guaraldi biographer Derrick Bang described the album as the "jazziest, swinging-est collection" of Guaraldi's Peanuts themes, highlighting a dynamic arrangement of "Linus and Lucy" and calling "Red Baron" a standout track. He emphasized Guaraldi's percussive piano style and effective use of harpsichord shading.

Both critics lamented the album's "maddeningly" brief runtime.

== Track listing ==
All tracks are written by Vince Guaraldi except where noted.

Side One
No.	Title	Length
1.	"Linus and Lucy"	2:59
2.	"You're in Love, Charlie Brown"	3:09
3.	"Peppermint Patty"	2:40
4.	"Great Pumpkin Waltz"	3:36

Side Two
No.	Title	Writer(s)	Length
5.	"It's Your Dog, Charlie Brown" (aka "He's Your Dog, Charlie Brown")		3:10
6.	"Oh, Good Grief"	Vince Guaraldi; Lee Mendelson	2:38
7.	"Red Baron"		4:50
8.	"Rain, Rain Go Away"		5:01
Total length:			27:31

== Charts ==
Chart (1968)	Peak position
US Top Jazz Albums (Billboard)	20

== Personnel ==
Vince Guaraldi Quartet

- Vince Guaraldi – piano, electric harpsichord
- Eddie Duran – guitar
- Stanley Gilbert – double bass
- Carl Burnett – drums

== Production ==
- Vince Guaraldi – arranger, producer
- Leo Kulka – engineer
- Ed Thrasher – art director
- Charles M. Schulz – cover artwork

== See also ==
- Vince Guaraldi discography
- List of songs recorded by Vince Guaraldi
- List of cover versions of Vince Guaraldi songs
- Lee Mendelson Film Productions
