= Jerry Granelli =

American-born Canadian jazz drummer (1940–2021)

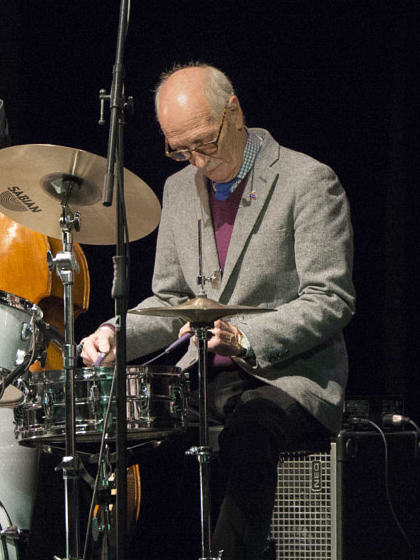
- Granelli in 2016

Background information
- Born: Gerald John Granelli; December 30, 1940; San Francisco, California, U.S.
- Died: July 20, 2021 (aged 80) Halifax, Nova Scotia, Canada
- Genre: Jazz
- Occupation: Musician
- Instrument: Drums

Gerald John Granelli (December 30, 1940 – July 20, 2021) was an American-Canadian jazz drummer. He was best known for playing drums on the soundtrack A Charlie Brown Christmas with the Vince Guaraldi Trio.

== Early life ==
Granelli was born to Jack and Ida Granelli in the Mission District of San Francisco on December 30, 1940.

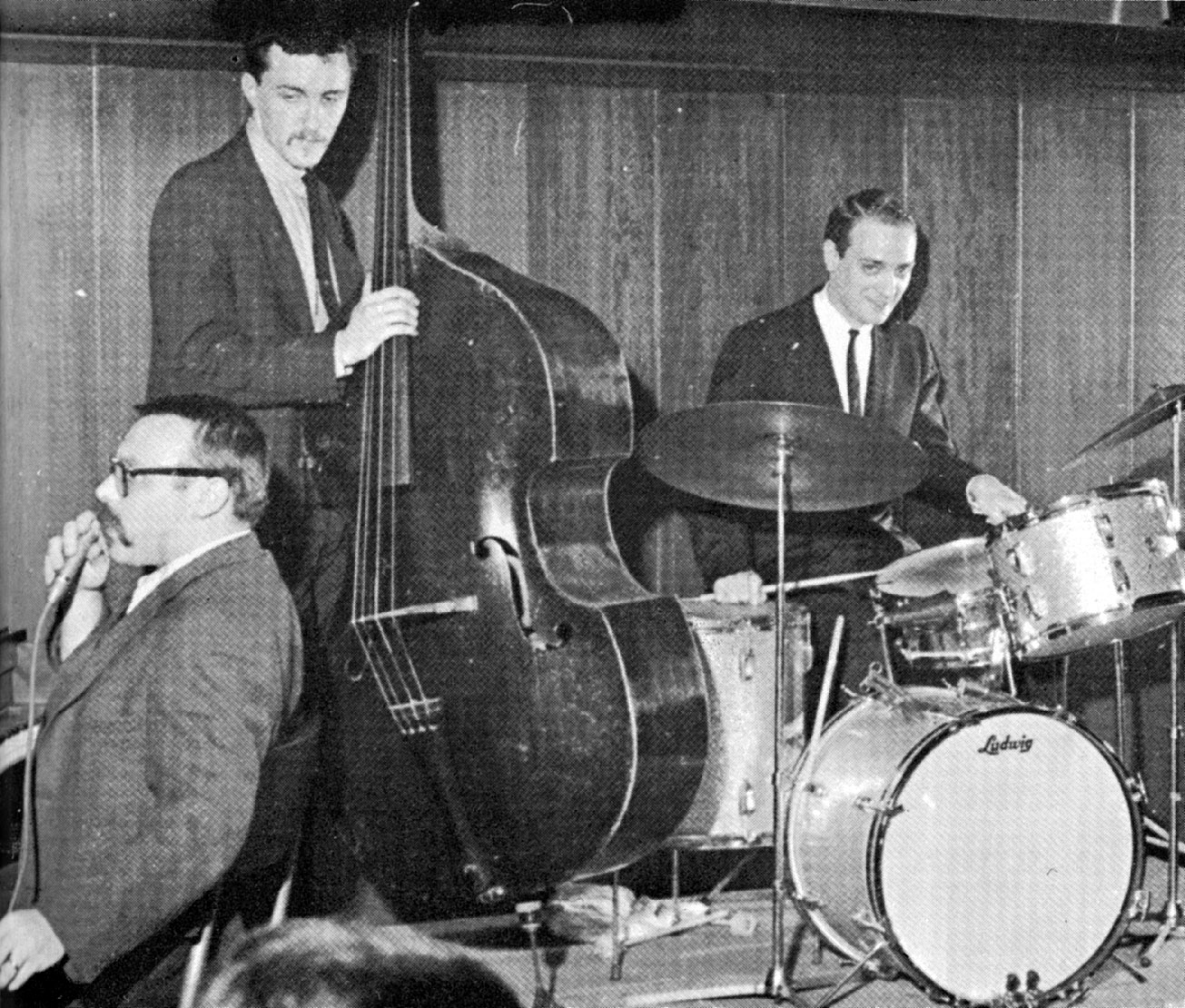
Granelli (right), Vince Guaraldi (seated), Fred Marshall performing as the Vince Guaraldi Trio in 1963.

Both his father and uncle played the drums and were passionate about jazz. Granelli initially learned the violin for a year, before switching to drums. He was consequently involved with the city's hard bop scene from a young age. A day spent with drummer Gene Krupa in 1948 informed his passion for percussion and eventually led to him studying with Joe Morello.

From the 1990s until his death, Granelli lived in Halifax, Nova Scotia, becoming a Canadian citizen in 1999. In 2010, he released his first solo album, 1313. Granelli toured jazz festivals and theaters with his show Tales of a Charlie Brown Christmas, which retells how the Charlie Brown Christmas TV special almost never came to be, on numerous fronts. This includes the recounting of the three-hour recording session “just another gig” in 1965 that culminated in the timeless Christmas classic. The trio never saw any of the animation. The touring show, which first took place in 2013 in Halifax and Ottawa, featured Simon Fisk on Bass, Chris Gestrin on Piano and Jerry Granelli on Drums. The trio performed the Vince Guaraldi soundtrack “the way we used to play it live in San Francisco, taking the music out”, a highlight was a Jerry Granelli drum solo. The live production also featured clips from the TV special and Jerry talking about how all the pieces came together to create this unlikely classic Christmas special. Each performance also included a local children's choir, who would begin and end the show. The production toured Canada every November and December until 2019, once touring to Boulder, Colorado.

Granelli taught master classes on jazz composition at Vancouver Community College.

== Personal life ==
Granelli suffered a fall in December 2020 that resulted in internal bleeding. He spent three months recuperating in an intensive care unit before being discharged. He died seven months later on the morning of July 20, 2021, at his home in Halifax. He was 80, and hosted a workshop for the Halifax Jazz Festival two days before his death. He is survived by his second wife Nina Sebolt of Halifax, a son, bassist J. Anthony Granelli of Brooklyn, New York, another son, Vajra Granelli of Boulder, Colorado and a daughter, Alexis Granelli.

== Discography ==
With the Vince Guaraldi Trio

- Vince Guaraldi, Bola Sete and Friends (Fantasy, 1963)
- Jazz Casual: Paul Winter/Bola Sete and Vince Guaraldi (Koch Jazz, 1963)
- The Latin Side of Vince Guaraldi (Fantasy, 1964)
- From All Sides (Fantasy, 1965)
- A Charlie Brown Christmas (Fantasy, 1965)
- A Boy Named Charlie Brown (Columbia Masterworks, 1970; Kritzerland, 2017)

With Jane Ira Bloom

- Art and Aviation (Arabesque, 1992)

Selected

- Sound Songs (JMT/Winter & Winter, 1986)
- As Tears Go By & Some More Songs (Jazzwerkstatt, 1987)
- Koputai (ITM, 1988)
- City of Eyes - Ralph Towner (ECM, 1989)
- One Day at a Time (Koch, 1990)
- A Song I Thought I Heard Buddy Sing (ITM, 1992)
- Another Place (Intuition, 1994)
- News from the Street (Intuition, 1995)
- Broken Circle (Intuition, 1996)
- Enter, a Dragon (Songlines, 1998)
- Forces of Flight (Select, 1999)
- Crowd Theory (Songlines, 1999)
- Iron Sky (Love Slave, 2001)
- The Only Juan (Love Slave, 2002)
- The V16 Project (Songlines Recordings, 2003)
- Sandhills Reunion (Songlines, 2005)
- 1313 (Divorce, 2010)
- Music Has Its Way with Me (Traumton, 2000)
- What I Hear Now (Addo, 2015)
- Dance Hall (Justin Time, 2017)
- Plays Vince Guaraldi & Mose Allison (RareNoiseRecords, 2020)
