= Jazz Impressions of A Boy Named Charlie Brown =

Soundtrack album by Vince Guaraldi
- Released: December 1964
- Recorded: May 26, September 11 and October 26, 1964
- Studios: Coast, San Francisco; Whitney, Glendale
- Genre: Jazz
- Length: 33:29 (original); 94:35 (2025 release)
- Label: Fantasy

Vince Guaraldi chronology
The Latin Side of Vince Guaraldi (1964)	Jazz Impressions of A Boy Named Charlie Brown (1964)	From All Sides (1965)

Singles from Jazz Impressions of A Boy Named Charlie Brown
- 1. "Oh, Good Grief"/"Linus and Lucy" Released: 1964

Alternate cover
- 1972 re-release, 2014 CD remaster

Professional ratings
Review scores
Source	Rating
AllMusic	5/5 stars
All About Jazz	4/5 stars
Five Cents Please	5/5 stars
The Boston Globe	5/5 stars
The Penguin Guide to Jazz Recordings	3/4 stars

Jazz Impressions of A Boy Named Charlie Brown (stylized with quotation marks as Jazz Impressions of "A Boy Named Charlie Brown") is the sixth studio album by American jazz pianist Vince Guaraldi (credited to the Vince Guaraldi Trio), released in the U.S. by Fantasy Records in December 1964. It is the soundtrack to the unreleased television documentary film entitled A Boy Named Charlie Brown.

== Background ==
In late 1963, television producer Lee Mendelson contacted Peanuts creator Charles M. Schulz to propose a documentary profiling the cartoonist. Mendelson had recently completed A Man Named Mays, a documentary about baseball player Willie Mays. Schulz agreed, and the project — titled A Boy Named Charlie Brown — entered production. The film included segments shot in Sebastopol, California, St. Paul, Minnesota, Hawaii, and Pebble Beach, California.

Although Schulz preferred classical music, Mendelson envisioned a jazz score. After being turned down by Cal Tjader and Dave Brubeck, Mendelson heard Guaraldi's "Cast Your Fate to the Wind" on KSFO radio and enlisted him to score the film.

== Music and recording process ==
Between May and October 1964, Guaraldi composed and recorded nine original jazz pieces for Lee Mendelson's documentary A Boy Named Charlie Brown, which, though ultimately unaired, marked the pianist's first collaboration with the Peanuts franchise. Recording sessions took place at Coast Recorders in San Francisco (May 26 and September 11) and at Whitney Studio in Glendale, California (October 26). Guaraldi was joined by bassist Monty Budwig and drummer Colin Bailey, forming the Vince Guaraldi Trio.

Musically, the album blends West Coast jazz with elements of cool jazz, bebop, blues, and bossa nova. Tracks such as "Linus and Lucy" showcase Guaraldi's use of modal voicings, quartal harmonies, and ostinato-driven rhythms. Though originally composed for the documentary, the piece became emblematic of the Peanuts brand and was frequently reused in later specials, most notably A Charlie Brown Christmas. Its enduring popularity helped establish Guaraldi's musical association with the franchise.

Other selections, including "Baseball Theme" and "Oh, Good Grief", illustrate Guaraldi's integration of character themes with jazz idioms. "Baseball Theme" reinterprets the harmonic structure of "Take Me Out to the Ball Game", while "Oh, Good Grief" blends major-key motifs with syncopated, blues-inspired phrasing. "Schroeder" was structured like a Romantic classical piano étude, paying homage to the character's affinity for Beethoven, and featured classical voice-leading and arpeggiated textures. "Happiness Theme" adopts a waltz-like feel in 3/4 meter, while "Pebble Beach" reflects Brazilian influences. "Blue Charlie Brown" explores jazz ballad structures in various keys.

The sessions were engineered using standard analog equipment of the period. The piano was recorded using close microphone placement, while the rhythm section was captured with room microphones and acoustic baffles. According to Bailey, Guaraldi often arrived with basic sketches and developed arrangements collaboratively during recording.

Unreleased alternate takes, such as solo piano versions, bossa nova interpretations, and early structural variants, were later included in the album's 2025 expanded edition.

== Cover artwork ==
Charles M. Schulz's original drawing of Vince Guaraldi seated at the piano, complete with hand-drawn face and handlebar mustache. The adult character is visually integrated with the Peanuts ensemble. The album cover replaces Schulz's drawn face with a real photo of Guaraldi, creating a visual hybrid.

The album cover for Jazz Impressions of A Boy Named Charlie Brown was developed in late 1964 as part of Fantasy Records' broader effort to market the album as a premium release. Unlike the label's typical budget-conscious packaging, this album featured a full-color gatefold jacket. Artwork was provided directly by Schulz, who created bespoke illustrations specifically for the project.

The front cover depicted core Peanuts characters Charlie Brown, Linus, Lucy, Schroeder, and Snoopy alongside an adult figure at the piano. Schulz originally rendered the adult figure entirely in his cartoon style to represent Guaraldi, but for the final production, a black-and-white photograph of Guaraldi's actual head was pasted over the illustration, creating a hybrid image. The decision to substitute the drawn face was made by Fantasy Records co-founder Max Weiss and was intended to maintain the Peanuts aesthetic while also promoting Guaraldi's identity as a jazz performer.

The back cover featured twelve individual Schulz character drawings, which were reproduced inside the gatefold as frame-ready 8-by-10 prints. This design marked one of the earliest examples of cross-media branding between comic art and recorded music.

For the 1972 reissue, Fantasy replaced the original cover with one of the 8-by-10 images, showing Charlie Brown on a pitcher's mound wearing his yellow striped shirt. The title was shortened to A Boy Named Charlie Brown, and the subtitle referencing the television special was removed. Later CD editions reused this version, while the 2025 anniversary release restored the original 1964 artwork and title.

== Release ==
Despite the documentary never airing, Jazz Impressions of A Boy Named Charlie Brown was released in December 1964 by Fantasy Records as a standalone album. A short concert series at the Hotel Claremont in Berkeley, California in January 1965 served as its public launch. These performances featured Guaraldi with guitarist Bola Sete, bassist Tom Beeson, and drummer Benny Barth.

The album was reissued on compact disc in 1989 under the simplified title A Boy Named Charlie Brown and included a bonus live recording of "Fly Me to the Moon". The cover art for this edition featured Charlie Brown in a red shirt and baseball cap. A 2014 remaster, titled A Boy Named Charlie Brown (The Original Sound Track Recording), reinstated the subtitle and added an alternate take of "Baseball Theme", with cover art reflecting the 1972 reissue design.

In April 2025, Craft Recordings released a newly remastered and expanded edition to mark the 75th anniversary of the Peanuts franchise. This edition restored the original title and artwork and included fourteen previously unreleased alternate takes and session outtakes. The audio restoration and mastering were completed by Paul Blakemore.

A limited-edition vinyl pressing containing the alternate takes was released the following day as part of Record Store Day 2025.

== Critical reception ==
Upon release, the album received positive reviews. In the original liner notes, critic Ralph J. Gleason described Guaraldi's score as an example of an artist responding empathetically to another medium while maintaining a distinct personal style.

Cashbox praised the album's originality, highlighting Guaraldi's inventiveness and suggesting the potential for commercial success similar to his earlier hit "Cast Your Fate to the Wind". The magazine also noted that the accompanying 45 rpm single provided accessible programming for radio stations.

In later reviews, AllMusic critic Richard S. Ginell remarked that the album introduced many listeners to jazz and highlighted the trio's spirited, uncompromising performances, which maintained a strong jazz sensibility even when paired with animated subject matter. Guaraldi biographer Derrick Bang emphasized the album's influence, noting its role in defining the musical identity of the Peanuts specials. He observed that it was one of the few soundtracks issued for a film that was never aired, and that its compositions remained central to the franchise's long-term sound.

== Legacy ==
Although the documentary was not broadcast, the soundtrack album became a blueprint for the musical style of future Peanuts specials. Guaraldi's work on this release led to his continued collaboration with Lee Mendelson and Charles Schulz, beginning with A Charlie Brown Christmas in 1965.

The album introduced musical themes and motifs that would be reused in later specials, helping to establish a recognizable sound for the franchise. "Linus and Lucy", in particular, became widely associated with the Peanuts brand and has since been recognized as one of the most iconic pieces of television music. Guaraldi's use of small jazz ensembles and character-based motifs was seen as innovative in the context of 1960s television music. The album is credited with helping to bridge jazz and popular media, making the genre more accessible to younger audiences and families.

Over time, Jazz Impressions of A Boy Named Charlie Brown has been acknowledged as an important work in both Guaraldi's career and the broader history of jazz soundtracks. Its influence on television scoring and its role in shaping the identity of a major cultural franchise have been widely recognized.

== Chart performance ==
The album peaked at number 20 on the Billboard Soundtracks chart on the week ending March 13, 2015.

== Track listing ==
All tracks composed by Vince Guaraldi, except where noted

=== Original 1964 release ===
Side One
No.	Title	Writer(s)	Length
1.	"Oh, Good Grief"	Vince Guaraldi; Lee Mendelson	2:21
2.	"Pebble Beach"		2:47
3.	"Happiness Theme (Happiness Is)^{[d]}"		3:37
4.	"Schroeder^{[d]}"		1:51
5.	"Charlie Brown Theme"	Vince Guaraldi; Lee Mendelson	4:20

Side Two
No.	Title	Length
6.	"Linus and Lucy"	3:03
7.	"Blue Charlie Brown"	7:26
8.	"Baseball Theme"	3:13
9.	"Frieda (With the Naturally Curly Hair)^{[a]}"	4:31
Total length:		33:09

=== 1989 CD release ===
No.	Title	Writer(s)	Length
10.	"Fly Me to the Moon"	Bart Howard	8:55

=== 2014 CD remaster ===
No.	Title	Length
11.	"Baseball Theme ^{[b]}" (alternate take)	1:56
Total length:		44:00

=== 2025 remaster/Expanded Edition ===
No.	Title	Writer(s)	Length
10.	"Linus and Lucy" (Studio Test)		2:28
11.	"Linus and Lucy^{[d]}" (Take 3)		1:14
12.	"Happiness Theme (Happiness Is)^{[d]}" (Take 4)		3:36
13.	"Pebble Beach^{[d]}" (Take 7)		2:37
14.	"Baseball Theme^{[b]}" (Take 1)		1:27
15.	"Oh, Good Grief ^{[d]}" (Take 1)	Vince Guaraldi; Lee Mendelson	1:57
16.	"Schroeder" (Take 3)		1:37
17.	"Baseball Theme^{[d]}" (Take 2)		2:29
18.	"Oh, Good Grief^{[d]}" (Take 1/Later Session)	Vince Guaraldi; Lee Mendelson	2:44
19.	"Schroeder" (Take 2)		0:48
20.	"Blues For Peanuts^{[c]}^{[d]}"		4:39
21.	"Charlie Brown Theme" (Take 4)	Vince Guaraldi; Lee Mendelson	4:50
22.	"Blue Charlie Brown" (Take 1)		5:28
23.	"Frieda (With the Naturally Curly Hair)" (Take 1)		6:11
24.	"Fly Me to the Moon^{[c]}"	Bart Howard	9:00
25.	"Autumn Leaves^{[c]}"	Joseph Kosma; Johnny Mercer	10:17
Total length:			94:35

Notes

- ^{^[a]} original 1964 LP release misspells "Frieda" as "Freda"
- ^{^[b]} 1:56 version of "Baseball Theme" issued as alternate take on 2014 remaster is an edited extension of a shorter performance; original, unedited session take (1:27) later released as "Baseball Theme (Take 1)" on 2025 expanded edition
- ^{^[c]} previously released
- ^{^[d]}take utilized in documentary

== Session information ==
The following table outlines the known recording sessions for Jazz Impressions of A Boy Named Charlie Brown, including key track development, studio locations, personnel, and release status. The information is based on original Fantasy Records session documentation and the 2025 expanded reissue liner notes.

Sessionography: Jazz Impressions of A Boy Named Charlie Brown
Track title	Recording Date	Studio	Personnel	Take Notes / Variants	Release Status
Linus and Lucy	April 30, 1964 (test)	Unknown (solo test session)	Vince Guaraldi (solo)	Early version; faster tempo, repeated chorus, no bridge. Exploratory take.	Released (2025 reissue)
Linus and Lucy	May 26, 1964	Coast Recorders, San Francisco	Guaraldi, Monty Budwig (bass), Colin Bailey (drums)	Final trio version; AABA form with full swing bridge. Became Peanuts signature theme.	Released (1964 LP)
Baseball Theme	May 26, 1964	Coast Recorders	Guaraldi Trio	Two known alternates: one with a short vamp ending; one slower version with alternate bridge and outro.	Alternates released (2025 reissue)
Charlie Brown Theme	September 11, 1964	Coast Recorders	Guaraldi Trio	Reflective minor-key theme; unconfirmed alternates.	Released (1964 LP)
Oh, Good Grief	September 11, 1964	Coast Recorders	Guaraldi Trio	One version opens with extended rubato intro; another is up-tempo with an improvisational bridge.	Final and alternates released (2025)
Schroeder	September 11, 1964	Coast Recorders	Guaraldi Trio (alt), solo piano (final)	Two alternates: one trio fast version; one bossa nova. Final version is solo piano in classical étude style.	All versions released (2025 reissue)
Blue Charlie Brown	October 26, 1964	Whitney Studio, Glendale	Guaraldi Trio	Melancholic blues ballad; unused in final documentary.	Released (1964 LP)
Happiness Theme	May 26, 1964	Coast Recorders	Guaraldi Trio	Light waltz structure; no known alternate takes.	Released (1964 LP)
Pebble Beach	October 26, 1964	Whitney Studio	Guaraldi Trio	Latin-influenced melody; possibly tied to golf tournament scene. Praised by drummer Colin Bailey; unused in final documentary	Released (1964 LP)
Frieda (With the Naturally Curly Hair)	September 11, 1964	Coast Recorders	Guaraldi Trio	Short and cheerful character sketch; name misspelled as "Freda" on release.	Released (1964 LP)

Notes

- All sessions produced by Lee Mendelson. Recording engineer(s) uncredited; analog tape tracking typical of Fantasy Records productions. Session logs were reconstructed in part from Fantasy archival sources and musician interviews.

== Personnel ==
Credits adapted from 2025 expanded reissue liner notes.

=== 1964 personnel ===
Vince Guaraldi Trio

- Vince Guaraldi – piano
- Monty Budwig – double bass
- Colin Bailey – drums

Production

- Lee Mendelson – liner notes
- Ralph J. Gleason – liner notes
- Charles M. Schulz – artwork

=== 2025 reissue personnel ===
- Mark Piro – producer
- Chris Clough – audio supervision
- Paul Blakemore – restoration and mastering
- Ryan Jebavy – editorial
- John Sellards – design
- Derrick Bang – liner notes
- Simon Edwards – project assistance
- Sig Sigworth – project assistance
- Scott Webber – project assistance
- Mason Williams – project assistance
- Michelle Zarr – project assistance

== See also ==
- Bill Melendez
- Peanuts filmography
- A Charlie Brown Christmas (soundtrack) (1965)
- It's the Great Pumpkin, Charlie Brown (soundtrack) (1966)
- A Charlie Brown Thanksgiving (soundtrack) (1973)
- Vince Guaraldi discography
- List of songs recorded by Vince Guaraldi
- List of cover versions of Vince Guaraldi songs
- Lee Mendelson Film Productions
