= A Boy Named Charlie Brown (soundtrack) =

1970/2017 soundtrack albums by Vince Guaraldi, Rod McKeun, John Scott Trotter

The 1969 American animated musical comedy-drama film A Boy Named Charlie Brown, based on Charles M. Schulz's comic strip Peanuts, had two different soundtrack albums. These albums were released individually in 1970 and 2017.

== Recording ==
The soundtrack of the 1969 feature film A Boy Named Charlie Brown represented an expansion of the established Peanuts musical style. Building on his earlier television work, composer Vince Guaraldi adapted several of his signature themes, including "Skating", "Baseball Theme", "Charlie Brown and His All-Stars", "Oh, Good Grief!", "Air Music" and "Blue Charlie Brown". Multiple variations of "Linus and Lucy" were also incorporated. In addition, Guaraldi reworked "Lucifer's Lady" from his 1969 album The Eclectic Vince Guaraldi, retitled "Kite Music (Lucifer's Lady)" for the film.

Producer Lee Mendelson, seeking to broaden the musical scope for a theatrical audience, enlisted arranger John Scott Trotter to supplement Guaraldi's jazz with orchestral elements. Trotter had previously collaborated with Guaraldi on the Peanuts television soundtracks starting with It's the Great Pumpkin, Charlie Brown in 1966, and his orchestrations were intended to support larger-scale scenes. Guaraldi's trio was used for character-centered sequences, while Trotter's arrangements contributed dramatic and cinematic weight to more expansive moments. (Guaraldi did not return for the next Peanuts movie, Snoopy Come Home; Mendelson instead chose the Sherman Brothers, best known for their work with Disney.)

Recording sessions began in April 1969 at Coast Recorders in San Francisco, where Guaraldi was joined by bassist Peter Marshall and drummer Jerry Granelli. Initial sessions focused on the jazz trio's contributions. Orchestral components were recorded later that summer at Western Recorders in Hollywood, where Trotter oversaw sessions featuring Jack Latimer (piano), Arthur C. Smith (woodwinds), Jack Sperling (drums), and Ray Brown (bass). Additional performers included violinists, cellists, and trombonists such as Milton Bernhart and Edward Kusby.

A major recording session took place in August 1969, with Guaraldi leading a septet that included Monty Budwig (bass), Conte Candoli (trumpet), Herb Ellis (guitar), Victor Feldman (percussion), Sperling (drums), and Bernhart (trombone). The morning focused on jazz ensemble recordings, followed by orchestral overdubs in the afternoon. Trotter's orchestration added string, brass, and woodwind layers to Guaraldi's rhythm section, achieving a fuller and more theatrical sound.

One example of the combined musical approach occurs during the skating sequence at Rockefeller Center. Guaraldi's original "Skating" theme introduces the scene, followed by Trotter's new cue "Blue Puck," which introduces harmonic and rhythmic contrast. The music drives the action without dialogue, reflecting the film's reliance on musical storytelling.

In more subdued scenes, such as the psychiatrist booth conversation between Charlie Brown and Lucy, Guaraldi's trio provides an introspective atmosphere. These quieter cues contrast with the more expansive arrangements used in scenes involving fantasy, travel, or emotional climax.

Rod McKuen contributed three original songs to the soundtrack: "A Boy Named Charlie Brown", Failure Face", and "Champion Charlie Brown" and the title track. His songs served as narrative interludes that conveyed character insight and mood. Meanwhile, Trotter contributed the song "I Before E" as well as additional instrumental themes, such as "Cloud Dreams," "Catatonic Blues," and "Bus Wheel Blues", that extended the film's orchestral palette.

== Musical themes and legacy ==
The music for A Boy Named Charlie Brown reflects a layered approach that combined Guaraldi's established jazz idiom with Trotter's orchestral scoring. Guaraldi reused and expanded familiar Peanuts themes, occasionally altering harmony, rhythm, or key to fit new scenes. His arrangements for piano trio often left space for improvisation, maintaining the fluid, conversational tone of his earlier work. At the time of production, Guaraldi was concurrently working on the television special It Was a Short Summer, Charlie Brown and what would become his final studio album, Alma-Ville (1969). Many of the same musicians participated across all three projects, contributing to a unified sound and creative continuity in Guaraldi's late-1960s output.

Trotter's contributions emphasized emotional scope, using strings and brass to underscore moments of tension, ambition, or triumph. For example, Charlie Brown's spelling bee journey is accompanied by harmonically rich orchestration that underscores both anxiety and hope. Snoopy's fantasy segments similarly feature broad harmonic motion and instrumental color. This contrast between jazz and orchestral material gave the score a dynamic quality not commonly heard in animated features of the era.

McKuen's vocal pieces offered a third stylistic layer. His lyrics emphasized themes of failure, effort, and self-reflection, while his vocal delivery provided a folk-influenced counterpoint to the instrumental score. These songs functioned as character monologues, extending the emotional reach of the film's narrative.

The score for A Boy Named Charlie Brown is often described as one of Guaraldi's most ambitious undertakings. It effectively expanded the musical vocabulary of the Peanuts franchise while preserving its core identity. The integration of jazz, orchestration, and vocal writing contributed to the film's critical success and lasting influence on animated film music.

== Release history ==
A soundtrack album was released by Columbia Masterworks in 1970, featuring film dialogue interspersed with musical cues. In 2017, Kritzerland Records issued a limited-edition CD that included the complete instrumental score, allowing listeners to experience the full range of Guaraldi's and Trotter's contributions independent of the film's narration and effects.

== A Boy Named Charlie Brown: Selections from the Film Soundtrack ==
A Boy Named Charlie Brown: Selections from the Film Soundtrack

Soundtrack album by Vince Guaraldi, John Scott Trotter, Rod McKuen
- Released: 1970 (US, Canada, Australia, New Zealand); 1971 (UK); 1972 (Japan)
- Recorded: October 4, 1966 (Side 2, Track 9); April 19, July 10, July 30, August 14, October 14, 1969
- Studios: Coast Recorders, San Francisco, California; Western Recorders, Hollywood, California
- Genres: Jazz pop; Book-and-record set
- Length: 53:12
- Label: Columbia Masterworks
- Producers: Vince Guaraldi; John Scott Trotter

Vince Guaraldi chronology
Alma-Ville (1969)	A Boy Named Charlie Brown: Selections from the Film Soundtrack (1970)	Greatest Hits (1980)

A Boy Named Charlie Brown: Selections from the Film Soundtrack is the first of two soundtrack albums issued for the film, released in early 1970. The soundtrack was a commercial success and was nominated for an Academy Award for Best Original Score, ultimately losing to The Beatles' Let It Be. A Boy Named Charlie Brown: Selections from the Film Soundtrack was out of print by 1973. As of 2025, it has not been issued on CD.

Unlike traditional music soundtracks, A Boy Named Charlie Brown: Selections from the Film Soundtrack was presented as a condensed book-and-record radio play version of the film. The total runtime is approximately 50 minutes, with musical cues often serving as underscore to spoken scenes

=== Track listing ===
Despite individual tracks being listed on the album, track running times for each title were not published.

Side One
No.	Title	Writer(s)	Length
1.	"A Boy Named Charlie Brown" (vocal)	Rod McKuen
2.	"Cloud Dreams"	John Scott Trotter
3.	"Charlie Brown and His All-Stars"	Vince Guaraldi
4.	"We Lost Again"	Rod McKuen
5.	"Blue Charlie Brown"	Vince Guaraldi
6.	"Time To Go To School"	Vince Guaraldi
7.	"I Only Dread One Day at a Time"	Vince Guaraldi
8.	"Failure Face" (vocal)	Rod McKuen
9.	"By Golly I'll Show 'Em"	John Scott Trotter
10.	"Class Champion"	Rod McKuen
11.	""I" Before "E""	John Scott Trotter; Al Shean; Bill Melendez
12.	"School Spelling Bee"	John Scott Trotter
13.	"Champion Charlie Brown" (vocal)	Rod McKuen
Total length:			26:13

Side Two
No.	Title	Writer(s)	Length
1.	"Start Boning Up On Your Spelling, Charlie Brown"
2.	"You'll Either Be a Hero... Or a Goat"	Rod McKuen
3.	"Bus Station"	Rod McKuen
4.	"Bus Wheel Blues"	John Scott Trotter
5.	"Do Piano Players Make a Lot of Money?"	Ludwig van Beethoven
6.	"I've Got To Get My Blanket Back"	Vince Guaraldi
7.	"Big City"	Vince Guaraldi, Rod McKuen
8.	"Snoopy On Ice"	Vince Guaraldi, John Scott Trotter
9.	"Found Blanket" ("Linus and Lucy")	Vince Guaraldi
10.	"National Spelling Bee"	Rod McKuen
11.	"B-e-a-g-e-l"	Rod McKuen
12.	"Bus Wheel Blues"	John Scott Trotter
13.	"Homecoming"	Vince Guaraldi, Rod McKuen
14.	"I'm Never Going To School Again"	Rod McKuen
15.	"Welcome Home, Charlie Brown"	Vince Guaraldi
16.	"A Boy Named Charlie Brown" (vocal)	Rod McKuen
Total length:			26:59

== A Boy Named Charlie Brown: Original Motion Picture Soundtrack ==
A Boy Named Charlie Brown: Original Motion Picture Soundtrack

Soundtrack album by Vince Guaraldi, John Scott Trotter, Rod McKuen
- Released: March 2017
- Recorded: October 4, 1966 (track 18); April 19, July 10, July 30, August 14, October 14, 1969
- Studios: Coast Recorders, San Francisco, California; Western Recorders, Hollywood, California
- Genres: Jazz pop; Soundtrack
- Length: 78:25
- Label: Kritzerland
- Producers: Vince Guaraldi; John Scott Trotter; Craig E. Rogers; Erwan Laurent; Kevin Schwankner; Michael Cangelosi

Vince Guaraldi chronology
The Peanuts Movie (Original Motion Picture Soundtrack) (2015)	A Boy Named Charlie Brown: Original Motion Picture Soundtrack (2017)	The Complete Warner Bros.–Seven Arts Recordings (2018)

A Boy Named Charlie Brown: Original Motion Picture Soundtrack is the second of two soundtrack albums issued for the film. Released on CD by Kritzerland Records in 2017, the album featured the complete instrumental score, isolated from dialogue and sound effects. It was limited to 1,000 copies and sold out within one week of its release.

The release marked the first official presentation of the full score by Guaraldi and Trotter. Efforts to issue a music-only version had been delayed for decades due to licensing complexities. The original rights were split between Columbia Masterworks Records and Cinema Center Films, both of which had ceased operations, with ownership passing through multiple corporate transitions. Additionally, music clearances involved the estates of Trotter (d. 1975), Guaraldi (d. 1976), and Rod McKuen (d. 2015), whose contributions were also part of the original score.

=== Track listing ===
No.	Title	Writer(s)	Length
1.	"Champion Charlie Brown (Logo)"/"Cloud Dreams"	Rod McKuen/John Scott Trotter	1:15
2.	"Champion Charlie Brown (Main Title)"/"A Boy Named Charlie Brown" ("A Boy Named Charlie Brown" vocal: Rod McKuen)	Rod McKuen	3:29
3.	"Kite Music (Lucifer's Lady)"/"Charlie Brown and His All-Stars"	Vince Guaraldi	4:07
4.	"Percussion Swinger"/"Baseball Theme"	Vince Guaraldi	1:17
5.	"Baseball Theme" (Charlie Brown Pitches)	Vince Guaraldi	2:04
6.	"Baseball Theme (Three Strikes and You're Out)"/"A Boy Named Charlie Brown (We Lost Again)"/"Air Music (Snoopy Theme)"/"The Red Baron Strikes Again"	Vince Guaraldi/Rod McKuen/Vince Guaraldi/John Scott Trotter	7:12
7.	"Blue Charlie Brown"	Vince Guaraldi	5:55
8.	"Linus and Lucy (Time to Go to School)"/"Champion Charlie Brown (I Only Dread One Day at a Time)"	Vince Guaraldi/Rod McKuen	3:15
9.	"Failure Face (Lucy, Violet, Patty)"/"Catatonic Blues" (vocal on "Failure Face")	Rod McKuen/John Scott Trotter	1:23
10.	""I" Before "E"" (Charlie Brown, Linus)	John Scott Trotter; Al Shean; Bill Melendez	4:00
11.	"Champion Charlie Brown" (The Gang)	Rod McKuen	1:16
12.	"Oh, Good Grief"/"Champion Charlie Brown (Bus Station)"/"A Boy Named Charlie Brown"	Vince Guaraldi; Lee Mendelson; /Rod McKuen/Rod McKuen	3:18
13.	"Linus and Lucy (I've Got to Get My Blanket Back)" (minor key)	Vince Guaraldi	1:27
14.	"Bus Wheel Blues"	John Scott Trotter	1:19
15.	"A Boy Named Charlie Brown ("I" Before Milk)"/"Champion Charlie Brown"	Rod McKuen	1:53
16.	"Linus and Lucy (Big City)" (minor key)	Vince Guaraldi	1:01
17.	"Skating"/"Blue Puck"/"Skating (Snoopy on Ice)"	Vince Guaraldi/John Scott Trotter/Vince Guaraldi	5:12
18.	"Linus and Lucy (Found Blanket)"^{[a]}/"Champion Charlie Brown (Spelling Bee)"	Vince Guaraldi/Rod McKuen	3:49
19.	"A Boy Named Charlie Brown"/"Bus Wheel Blues"	Rod McKuen/John Scott Trotter	1:22
20.	"A Boy Named Charlie Brown (I'm Never Going to School Again)"	Rod McKuen	2:08
21.	"Charlie Brown and His All-Stars"	Vince Guaraldi	2:02
22.	"A Boy Named Charlie Brown" (vocal: Rod McKuen)	Rod McKuen	3:42

Bonus tracks
No.	Title	Writer(s)	Length
23.	"Champion Charlie Brown (Logo)" (alternate)	Rod McKuen	0:25
24.	"The Star-Spangled Banner" (alternate)	John Stafford Smith; arr. John Scott Trotter	1:03
25.	"Air Music (Snoopy Theme)"/"The Red Baron Strikes Again" (alternate)	Vince Guaraldi/John Scott Trotter	2:13
26.	"Piano Sonata No. 8 in C minor, Op. 13 (Sonata Pathétique) – III: Rondo: Allegro" (performed by Ingolf Dahl)	Ludwig van Beethoven	0:32
27.	"Bus Wheel Blues" (alternate)	John Scott Trotter	2:09
28.	"Champion Charlie Brown" (Transition)	Rod McKuen	0:17
29.	"Skating"/"Blue Puck"/"Skating (Snoopy on Ice)" (alternate)	Vince Guaraldi/John Scott Trotter/Vince Guaraldi	6:24
30.	"Linus and Lucy (Found Blanket)" (alternate)	Vince Guaraldi	0:29
31.	"Champion Charlie Brown" (unused jazz combo performed by Vince Guaraldi Quintet)	Rod McKuen	2:07
32.	"Dialogue (Linus, Charlie Brown)" (Linus: Glenn Gilger; Charlie Brown: Peter Robbins)	Rod McKuen	0:20
Total length:			78:25

Notes

- ^{^[a]}Track 18, "Linus and Lucy (Found Blanket)", is the same exact cue featured in the cold open of It's the Great Pumpkin, Charlie Brown (1966).

== Personnel ==
Credits were adapted from 2017 liner notes.

Vince Guaraldi Trio

- Vince Guaraldi – piano
- Peter Marshall – double bass
- Jerry Granelli – drums

Vince Guaraldi Septet

- Vince Guaraldi – piano
- Conte Candoli – trumpet
- Milton Bernhart – trombone
- Herb Ellis – guitar
- Monty Budwig – double bass
- Jack Sperling – drums
- Victor Feldman – percussion

Vince Guaraldi Sextet (Track 18, "Linus and Lucy (Found Blanket)")

- Vince Guaraldi – piano, electric keyboards, arranger
- Emmanuel Klein – trumpet
- John Gray – guitar
- Ronald Lang – woodwinds
- Monty Budwig – double bass
- Colin Bailey – drums

Additional

- Phil Macy – engineer (1970 release)
- Derrick Bang – liner notes (2017 release)

== See also ==
- Lee Mendelson
- Bill Melendez
- Peanuts filmography
- Lee Mendelson Film Productions
- Melendez Films
- A Charlie Brown Christmas (soundtrack) (1965)
- It's the Great Pumpkin, Charlie Brown (soundtrack) (1966)
- A Charlie Brown Thanksgiving (soundtrack) (1973)
