= The Complete Warner Bros.–Seven Arts Recordings =

Compilation album by Vince Guaraldi
- Released: July 6, 2018
- Recorded: 1968–1969
- Genres: Jazz; Latin jazz; jazz fusion; West Coast jazz; mainstream jazz
- Length: 145:59
- Label: Omnivore
- Producers: Vince Guaraldi; Shorty Rogers; Cheryl Pawelski

Vince Guaraldi chronology
A Boy Named Charlie Brown: Original Motion Picture Soundtrack (2017)	The Complete Warner Bros.–Seven Arts Recordings (2018)	It's the Great Pumpkin, Charlie Brown: Original Soundtrack Recording (2018)

Professional ratings
Review scores
Source	Rating
AllMusic	4/5 stars
Five Cents Please	4/5 stars
The Second Disc	5/5 stars
Audiophile Review	5/5 stars
Jazz Weekly	5/5 stars
Vintage Vinyl News	5/5 stars
The Recoup	5/5 stars

The Complete Warner Bros.–Seven Arts Recordings is a double CD compilation of songs by American jazz pianist/composer Vince Guaraldi released by Omnivore Recordings on July 6, 2018. It contains 30 tracks, containing remastered versions of Guaraldi's complete recorded output for Warner Bros.-Seven Arts (Oh Good Grief!, The Eclectic Vince Guaraldi, Alma-Ville), plus four bonus tracks.

== Background ==
Vince Guaraldi's final three albums released during his lifetime were recorded for Warner Bros.-Seven Arts after spending considerable time struggling to extricate himself from Fantasy Records. Warner signed Guaraldi to a three-record deal, and insisted that his inaugural release consist of his Peanuts songs. This was done in part to help fill the void left by a lack of soundtrack albums to accompany the successful television specials, Charlie Brown's All Stars!, It's the Great Pumpkin, Charlie Brown, You're in Love, Charlie Brown and He's Your Dog, Charlie Brown. Guaraldi responded with new renditions of eight of his most popular scores from those programs on his first release, Oh Good Grief!.

Guaraldi was then given complete artistic control over his sophomore, self-produced Warner effort, The Eclectic Vince Guaraldi, resulting in an unfocused and overindulgent album that was not well received by both critics and consumers. At Warner's insistence, arranger Shorty Rogers was recruited to produce Guaraldi's final album, Alma-Ville. Though deemed a focused improvement over the previous album, Warner lost interest in Guaraldi and did not promote the album. Both The Eclectic Vince Guaraldi and Alma-Ville fell into obscurity, with Oh Good Grief! remaining in print and a steady seller due to the perpetual popularity of the Peanuts franchise.

== Production ==
The Complete Warner Bros.–Seven Arts Recordings was compiled by prestige label Omnivore Recordings and produced by Grammy Award-winning Cheryl Pawelski. Pawelski recruited audio archivist Michael Graves (who worked on previous Guaraldi remastering efforts) to perform a high-definition 24-bit mix.

In addition to a double-CD release, Oh, Good Grief! was issued on translucent red vinyl.

== Track listings ==
All tracks written by Vince Guaraldi, except where noted.

=== Disc One ===
Oh Good Grief! (1968)
No.	Title	Writer(s)	Length
1.	"Linus and Lucy"		2:59
2.	"You're in Love, Charlie Brown"		3:09
3.	"Peppermint Patty"		2:40
4.	"Great Pumpkin Waltz"		3:37
5.	"He's Your Dog, Charlie Brown" (originally mistitled "It's Your Dog, Charlie Brown")		3:09
6.	"Oh, Good Grief!"	Vince Guaraldi; Lee Mendelson	2:38
7.	"Red Baron"		4:49
8.	"Rain, Rain Go Away"		5:06

The Eclectic Vince Guaraldi (1969)
No.	Title	Writer(s)	Length
9.	"Nobody Else"		3:12
10.	"Lucifer's Lady"		6:55
11.	"Black Sheep Boy"	Tim Hardin	2:42
12.	"Once I Loved"	Ray Gilbert; Antônio Carlos Jobim; Vinicius de Moraes	8:29
13.	"The Beat Goes On"	Sonny Bono	3:50
14.	"Yesterday"	John Lennon; Paul McCartney	3:38
15.	"Coffee and Doe-Nuts"		7:00
16.	"Reason to Believe"	Tim Hardin	2:55
17.	"It Was a Very Good Year"	Ervin Drake	6:43
Total length:			73:31

=== Disc Two ===
Previously unissued bonus tracks
No.	Title	Writer(s)	Length
1.	"Do You Know the Way to San Jose" (Take 15)	Burt Bacharach; Hal David	5:21
2.	"The Beat Goes On" (alternate take/Take 14)	Sonny Bono	7:18
3.	"Oh Happy Day" (unreleased)	Edwin Hawkins	3:44
4.	"The Sharecropper's Daughter" (unreleased)		2:40

Alma-Ville (1969)
No.	Title	Writer(s)	Length
5.	"The Masked Marvel"		5:20
6.	"Cristo Redentor"	Duke Pearson	4:49
7.	"Detained in San Ysidro"		3:33
8.	"Eleanor Rigby"	John Lennon; Paul McCartney	5:09
9.	"Uno Y Uno"		2:13
10.	"Alma-Ville"		4:33
11.	"Rio From the Air"		6:11
12.	"Watch What Happens" (from the film The Umbrellas of Cherbourg)	Norman Gimbel; Antoine Le Grand	4:11
13.	"Jimbo’s" (aka "Jambo's" and "Casaba")		7:26
Total length:			62:28

== Personnel ==
Credits adapted from CD liner notes.
Oh, Good Grief

- Vince Guaraldi – piano, electric harpsichord
- Eddie Duran – guitar
- Stanley Gilbert – double bass
- Carl Burnett – drums

The Eclectic Vince Guaraldi

- Vince Guaraldi – piano, electric harpsichord, guitar, lead vocals (Disc 1: tracks 11, 16)
- Eddie Duran, Robert Addison – guitars
- Bob Maize, Jim McCabe – electric bass
- Peter Marshall – bass
- Gerald Granelli, Al Coster – drums
- Gloria Strassner, Jesse Ehrlich – cello

Alma-Ville

- Vince Guaraldi – piano, guitar
- Herb Ellis – guitar (Disc 2: tracks 7, 8, 10, 13)
- Eddie Duran – guitar (Disc 2: tracks 5, 6, 9, 12)
- Monty Budwig – bass (Disc 2: tracks 7, 8, 10, 13)
- Kelly Bryan – bass (Disc 2: tracks 5, 6, 9, 12)
- Sebastião Neto – electric bass (Disc 2: track 11)
- Dom Um Romão – drums (Disc 2: track 11)
- Colin Bailey – drums (Disc 2: tracks 7, 8, 10, 13)
- Al Coster – drums (Disc 2: tracks 5, 6, 9, 12)
- Rubens Bassini – percussion (Disc 2: tracks 11, 13)

Bonus tracks

- Vince Guaraldi – piano
- Eddie Duran – guitar (Tracks 3, 4)
- Peter Marshall – bass (Tracks 3, 4)
- Bob Belanski – drums (Tracks 3, 4)

Additional musicians for Disc 2, Tracks 1 and 2 are unknown.

== See also ==
- Vince Guaraldi discography
- List of songs recorded by Vince Guaraldi
- List of cover versions of Vince Guaraldi songs
- Lee Mendelson Film Productions
