= Linus and Lucy =

- US 7" single

Single by Vince Guaraldi

from the album Jazz Impressions of A Boy Named Charlie Brown
- A-side: "Oh, Good Grief"
- Released: December 1964
- Recorded: October 26, 1964
- Genre: Jazz; boogie-woogie
- Length: 3:06
- Label: Fantasy
- Songwriter: Vince Guaraldi

Vince Guaraldi singles chronology
"Treat Street" (1964)	"Oh, Good Grief" / "Linus and Lucy" (1964)	"Theme to Grace" (1965)

Music video
- "Linus and Lucy" on YouTube

"Linus and Lucy" is a popular instrumental jazz standard written by American jazz pianist Vince Guaraldi. It serves as the main theme tune for the many Peanuts animated specials and is named for the two fictional siblings Linus and Lucy Van Pelt. The jazz standard was originally released on Guaraldi's album Jazz Impressions of A Boy Named Charlie Brown in 1964, but it gained its greatest exposure as part of A Charlie Brown Christmas soundtrack the following year. It is one of the most recognizable pieces by Guaraldi and has gained status as the signature melody of the Peanuts franchise. It has also become a popular song on radio stations playing Christmas music during the holidays.

== History ==
"Linus and Lucy" is named after fictional siblings Linus and Lucy van Pelt featured in the Peanuts comic strip

The composition "Linus and Lucy" originated from Vince Guaraldi's collaboration with television producer Lee Mendelson during the early development of a Peanuts-themed documentary. Mendelson, captivated by Guaraldi's Grammy-winning jazz single "Cast Your Fate to the Wind," sought a similar musical tone for a planned special on Charles M. Schulz's comic strip. After an introduction facilitated by San Francisco jazz critic Ralph J. Gleason, Guaraldi agreed to compose music for the unaired 1963 documentary A Boy Named Charlie Brown.

According to Mendelson, Guaraldi contacted him by phone shortly after their initial meeting, eager to share a newly written composition. He insisted on playing it over the phone, declaring he could not wait to present it in person. The energetic theme, performed by Guaraldi on solo piano, would later be recognized as "Linus and Lucy." Mendelson reportedly found the piece immediately fitting for Schulz's characters, especially the siblings Linus and Lucy van Pelt, after whom the composition would be named.

== Composition and recording ==
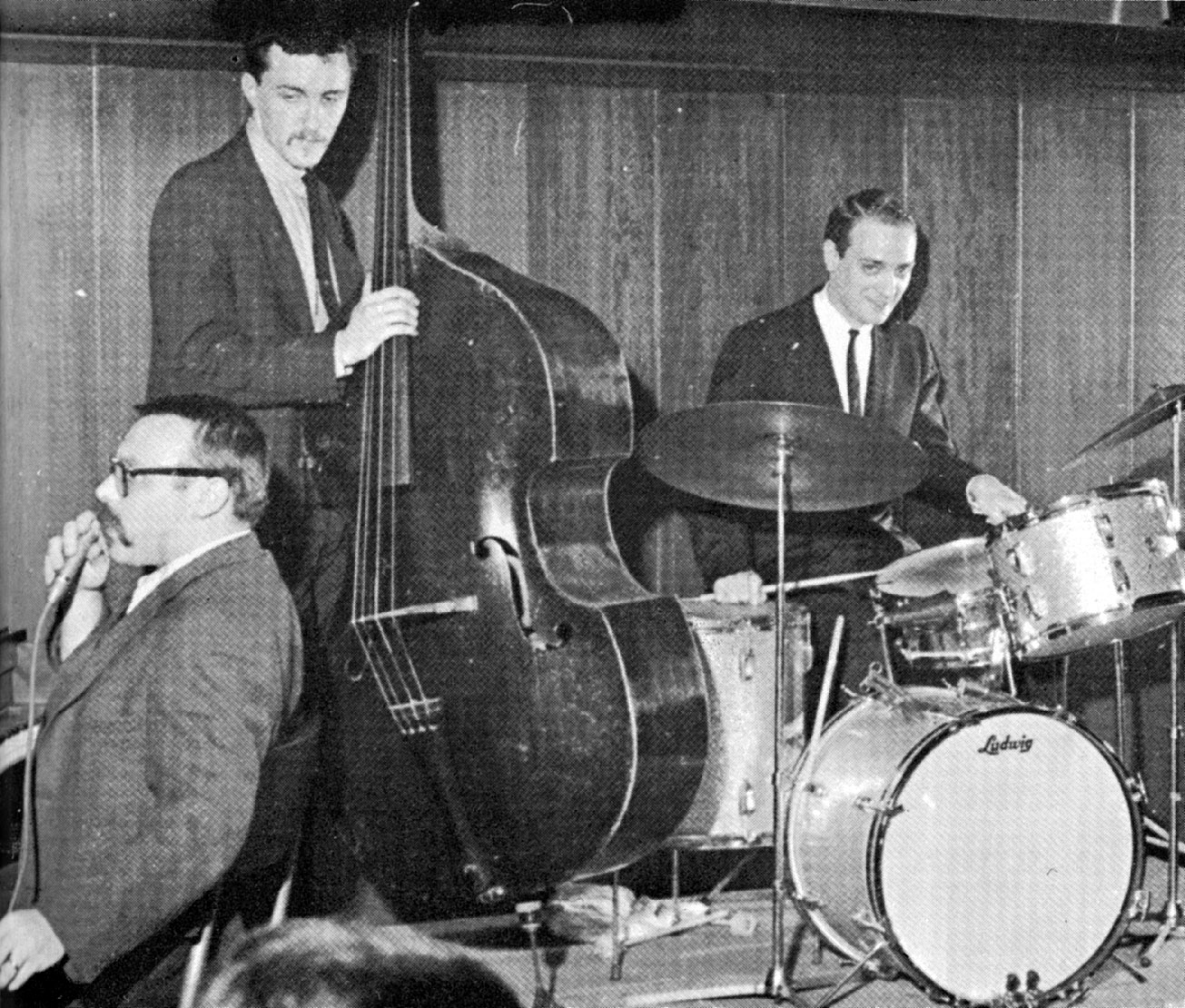
Guaraldi (left) performing with his trio in 1963. He recorded the television version of "Linus and Lucy" for A Charlie Brown Christmas (1965) with bassist Fred Marshall (center) and drummer Jerry Granelli (right).

=== Jazz Impressions of A Boy Named Charlie Brown (1964) ===
Guaraldi first recorded "Linus and Lucy" during two sessions in 1964 at Coast Recorders in San Francisco. These recordings, which also included eight additional pieces, were intended for the soundtrack to the unaired documentary. The pianist was joined by bassist Monty Budwig and drummer Colin Bailey. Although the film never aired, Fantasy Records released the album later that year under the title Jazz Impressions of A Boy Named Charlie Brown.

Musically, "Linus and Lucy" is distinguished by its driving left-hand boogie-woogie ostinato, syncopated melodic lines in the right hand, and modal harmonic language. The piece quickly became the standout track from the release, and its growing popularity positioned it as a musical emblem of the Peanuts franchise.

=== A Charlie Brown Christmas (1965) ===
The iconic dance sequence in A Charlie Brown Christmas. "Linus and Lucy" gained its greatest exposure through the special and became closely identified with the scene.

In preparation for the 1965 television special A Charlie Brown Christmas, Guaraldi re-recorded "Linus and Lucy" with a different rhythm section that featured Fred Marshall on bass and Jerry Granelli on drums. This session, held at Whitney Studio in Glendale, California, produced a sharper and more percussive arrangement with a quicker tempo and a stronger rhythmic attack. The version is featured prominently during the special's now-iconic dance sequence, where the Peanuts characters perform solo dance routines on stage. The bridge section of the composition underscores the moment when Snoopy jumps onto Schroeder's piano, adding syncopated intensity to the scene.

While the televised version differs slightly in tone and performance, the original 1964 trio version remains the most widely released and recognized recording, featured on multiple compilation albums and included on the soundtrack for A Charlie Brown Christmas.

=== It's the Great Pumpkin, Charlie Brown (1966) ===
A new arrangement was recorded in October 1966 for the Halloween special It's the Great Pumpkin, Charlie Brown. This version was taped at Desilu Studios in Hollywood and featured an expanded ensemble including Emmanuel Klein (trumpet), John Gray (guitar), and Ronald Lang (woodwinds), in addition to Guaraldi's rhythm section. The session was conducted by John Scott Trotter.

The new arrangement features a lyrical flute played by Lang, which appears during the special's wordless opening sequence. The music underscores a scene in which Linus and Lucy visit a pumpkin patch, establishing an airy, autumnal mood. This version of the piece was later reused in the 1969 feature film A Boy Named Charlie Brown and served as a template for other specials, including He's Your Dog, Charlie Brown and It Was a Short Summer, Charlie Brown. The same recording was also featured in the 1979 public service announcement Charlie Brown Clears the Air.

Although Great Pumpkin introduced several new compositions, including "The Great Pumpkin Waltz," "The Red Baron," and "Graveyard Theme," it was "Linus and Lucy" that anchored the score thematically. Multiple alternate takes of the composition were recorded during the 1966 session, including variations in tempo and instrumentation. One notable version replaces Lang's flute with Klein's trumpet to emphasize a brassier tone; another take ends with an exaggerated repetition of the closing motif.

=== Subsequent versions (1969–1976) ===
Guaraldi performing at Santa Clara University, January 5, 1974

Guaraldi continued to revisit "Linus and Lucy" in multiple forms, and in later years increasingly reworked fragments of the piece rather than presenting it in full:

- In It Was a Short Summer, Charlie Brown (1969), he arranged the theme for chamber jazz ensemble with notable solos by guitarist Herb Ellis and trumpeter Conte Candoli, omitting the bridge and breaking the theme into shorter cues.
- The feature film A Boy Named Charlie Brown (1969) includes several variations, such as the minor-key "I've Got to Get My Blanket Back" and the slow, flute-laden "Time to Go to School."
- You're Not Elected, Charlie Brown (1972) featured electric piano and jazz fusion textures, including one cue built solely from the bridge section.
- A Charlie Brown Thanksgiving (1973) introduced a funk-infused version recorded with Mike Clark on drums and Tom Harrell on trumpet, noted for its groove and rhythmic complexity.
- It's the Easter Beagle, Charlie Brown (1974) presented three stylistic variants: swing trio, Spanish-influenced, and ballad.
- Be My Valentine, Charlie Brown (1975) deconstructed the bridge in short transitional cues, marked by modal harmony and chromatic descent.
- You're a Good Sport, Charlie Brown (1975) reimagined the bridge as a flamenco-style pasodoble to score a brief football gag in which Lucy stops Charlie Brown's kick attempt.
- In It's Arbor Day, Charlie Brown (1976), "Snoopy at Bat" concludes with a brief, high-register interpolation of the theme; this was Guaraldi's final known use of "Linus and Lucy" before his death in February 1976.

== Musical composition and structure ==
"Linus and Lucy" is composed in A♭ major and follows a 32-bar AABA structure, a format common in jazz standards of the mid-20th century.

The A sections remain harmonically centered on the tonic and feature repeated motion to a chromatic upper-neighbor chord on B natural, a contrast often articulated through major seventh and other extended voicings. This alternation between tonic stability and chromatic displacement is one of the piece's principal harmonic features.

The bridge departs from the relative harmonic stasis of the A sections by introducing a functional ii–V–I progression in A♭ major, after which the opening material returns. Performances of the piece commonly include added-sixth tonic sonorities, major seventh inflections, and extended dominant voicings. The ii chord in the bridge may also be voiced quartally, reflecting aspects of mid-century jazz piano practice.

Rhythmically, the piece is driven by a repeating left-hand ostinato, while the right hand supplies syncopated chords and melodic figures. The interaction between these elements gives "Linus and Lucy" its characteristic momentum and clarity while allowing for modest variation in voicing and phrasing across repetitions.

=== Form ===
A section
A♭6 / A♭Δ	A♭6 / A♭Δ	A♭6 / A♭Δ	A♭6 / A♭Δ
BΔ(#11)	BΔ(#11)	A♭6 / A♭Δ	A♭6 / A♭Δ

A section
A♭6 / A♭Δ	A♭6 / A♭Δ	A♭6 / A♭Δ	A♭6 / A♭Δ
BΔ(#11)	BΔ(#11)	A♭6 / A♭Δ	A♭6 / A♭Δ

B section
B♭m7	E♭13 / E♭9	A♭Δ	A♭Δ
B♭m7	E♭13	A♭Δ	E♭13

A section
A♭6 / A♭Δ	A♭6 / A♭Δ	A♭6 / A♭Δ	A♭6 / A♭Δ
BΔ(#11)	BΔ(#11)	A♭6 / A♭Δ	A♭6 / A♭Δ

=== Harmonic analysis ===
A sections
I	I	I	I
♭IIΔ(#11)	♭IIΔ(#11)	I	I

B section
ii7	V7	I	I
ii7	V7	I	V7

The A sections are characterized by oscillation between the tonic (I) and a chromatic upper-neighbor harmony (♭II), while the bridge introduces a functional ii–V–I progression before returning to the tonic.

=== Performance practice ===
In performance, the tonic harmony is frequently articulated as A♭6 or A♭ major seventh (Amaj7), while the chromatic upper-neighbor chord is often voiced as a B major seventh (Bmaj7) with a raised eleventh. The bridge commonly features extended dominant sonorities (such as E♭9 or E♭13), and the B♭ minor chord may be voiced in quartal structures.

The left hand typically maintains a repeating ostinato outlining the tonic harmony, while the right hand provides syncopated chordal figures and melodic fragments. Subtle variation in voicing, articulation, and phrasing is common across repetitions of the form.

== Legacy and cultural impact ==
Since its first appearance in Peanuts television specials, "Linus and Lucy" has become one of the most recognizable compositions in American popular culture. It has been closely associated with the Peanuts characters, particularly Snoopy, whose animated dance sequences helped solidify the piece's connection to joy and nostalgia. The composition is widely regarded as Vince Guaraldi's signature work and is a staple of jazz education. It has been praised for its fusion of melodic accessibility and rhythmic sophistication, often used to introduce students to jazz idioms such as modal harmony and ostinato.

=== Copyright enforcement and Stephen Colbert licensing dispute ===
In May 2026, Lee Mendelson Film Productions (LMFP), which administers rights associated with the Peanuts television specials and their music, filed a series of copyright infringement lawsuits involving unauthorized uses of Peanuts music, including compositions by Vince Guaraldi. The defendants included the United States Department of Health and Human Services, video game publisher GameMill Entertainment, and operators of social media accounts for Heritage Auctions and Buckle-Down, Inc. The lawsuits received widespread media coverage and highlighted the continuing commercial value of music associated with the Peanuts franchise.

The lawsuits became the subject of a comedic segment during the final episode of The Late Show with Stephen Colbert, in which the program's house band, Louis Cato and the Great Big Joy Machine, performed "Linus and Lucy" without first obtaining a license. Colbert joked that the performance might "cost CBS money" because the music had not been cleared for broadcast. The segment attracted additional attention because CBS had originally broadcast most Peanuts television specials between 1965 and 2000.

On June 16, 2026, LMFP announced that it had reached a licensing agreement with CBS covering the use of the composition in the broadcast. The financial terms of the agreement were not disclosed. LMFP further announced that it would donate all proceeds received under the agreement to World Central Kitchen. LMFP chairman Jason Mendelson said that the company found the segment "funny and entertaining" while emphasizing the importance of obtaining written licenses for commercial uses of copyrighted music.

== Releases ==
The original 1964 studio version has appeared on the following:

- A Charlie Brown Christmas (1965)
- Greatest Hits (1980)
- Charlie Brown's Holiday Hits (1998)
- The Definitive Vince Guaraldi (2009)
- Peanuts Portraits (2010)
- The Very Best of Vince Guaraldi (2012)
- Peanuts Greatest Hits (2015)

Other notable recordings include:

- Oh Good Grief! (1968) – harpsichord version
- A Boy Named Charlie Brown (soundtrack) (1970) – minor key and flute versions
- The Charlie Brown Suite & Other Favorites (2003)
- Live on the Air (2008)
- An Afternoon with the Vince Guaraldi Quartet (2011)
- It's the Great Pumpkin, Charlie Brown (soundtrack) (2022)
- A Charlie Brown Thanksgiving (soundtrack) (2023)
- It Was a Short Summer, Charlie Brown (soundtrack) (2024)
- You're Not Elected, Charlie Brown (soundtrack) (2024)
- Be My Valentine, Charlie Brown (soundtrack) (2025)
- It's the Easter Beagle, Charlie Brown (soundtrack) (2025)
- You're a Good Sport, Charlie Brown (soundtrack) (2025)
- The Peanuts Collection, Vol. 1 (2025)
- It's Arbor Day, Charlie Brown (soundtrack) (2026)

=== Charts ===
Chart performance for "Linus and Lucy"
Chart (2021–2026)	Peak position
Global 200 (Billboard)	105
US Billboard Hot 100	37

=== Certifications ===
Region	Certification	Certified units/sales
Canada (Music Canada)	Platinum	80,000^{‡}
United States (RIAA)	Gold	500,000^{‡}
^{‡} Sales+streaming figures based on certification alone.

== See also ==
- List of cover versions of Vince Guaraldi songs
- List of jazz standards
- Christmas music
