= A Charlie Brown Christmas (soundtrack) =

- Original 1965 release

Soundtrack album by Vince Guaraldi
- Released: December 1965
- Recorded: October 26, 1964 ("Linus and Lucy"); September 17 – October 28, 1965
- Studios: Fantasy, San Francisco, California
- Genres: Christmas; jazz
- Length: 34:53 (original); 339:15 (2022 Deluxe)
- Label: Fantasy

Vince Guaraldi chronology
| At Grace Cathedral (1965) | A Charlie Brown Christmas (1965) | Live at El Matador (1966) |

Singles from A Charlie Brown Christmas
- 1. "Christmas Time Is Here (vocal)" Released: 1965

Alternate cover
- Fantasy 1988/2012 CD release cover art

A Charlie Brown Christmas is the eighth studio album by the American jazz pianist Vince Guaraldi (later credited to the Vince Guaraldi Trio). Released by Fantasy Records in December 1965, (Note: Derrick Bang writes the album was released in the first week of December 1965, so as to coincide with the special's television debut. An advertisement in the November 26 issue of The Sacramento Bee indicates the album may have already been on sale.) the album coincided with the debut of the television special A Charlie Brown Christmas featuring the Peanuts comic characters.

Guaraldi was contacted by the television producer Lee Mendelson to compose music for a documentary on Peanuts and its creator, Charles M. Schulz. Although the documentary went unaired, selections of the music were released in 1964 as Jazz Impressions of A Boy Named Charlie Brown. The Coca-Cola Company commissioned a Peanuts Christmas special in 1965 and Guaraldi returned to score the special.

Guaraldi composed most of the music, though he included versions of traditional carols such as "O Tannenbaum". He recorded at Whitney Studio in Glendale, California, then re-recorded parts at Fantasy Records Studios in San Francisco with a children's choir from St. Paul's Episcopal Church in San Rafael, California. The sessions ran late into the night, with the children rewarded with ice cream afterward. Bassist Fred Marshall and drummer Jerry Granelli were credited as performing on the album.

A Charlie Brown Christmas was voted into the Grammy Hall of Fame and added to the National Recording Registry of the Library of Congress. In November 2014, it was the 10th best-selling Christmas/holiday album in the United States during the SoundScan era.

In August 2026, it was certified sextuple platinum by the Recording Industry Association of America for six million album-equivalent units in the United States, making it the best-selling jazz album of all time.

== Background ==
By the early 1960s, Charles M. Schulz's comic strip Peanuts had become internationally popular. Television producer Lee Mendelson, a jazz fan, heard "Cast Your Fate to the Wind" by pianist Vince Guaraldi and asked him to compose music for a proposed Peanuts documentary, A Boy Named Charlie Brown. Guaraldi wrote "Linus and Lucy" for the project, which became the musical theme most closely associated with the franchise. Although the documentary attracted interest from advertisers, television networks declined to air it.

In April 1965, Time featured Peanuts on its cover, further reflecting the strip's cultural prominence. Later that year, the Coca-Cola Company commissioned the Christmas special A Charlie Brown Christmas. Guaraldi, who had recently recorded At Grace Cathedral with the 68-voice choir of St. Paul's Church of San Rafael, returned to score the production.

== Recording and production ==
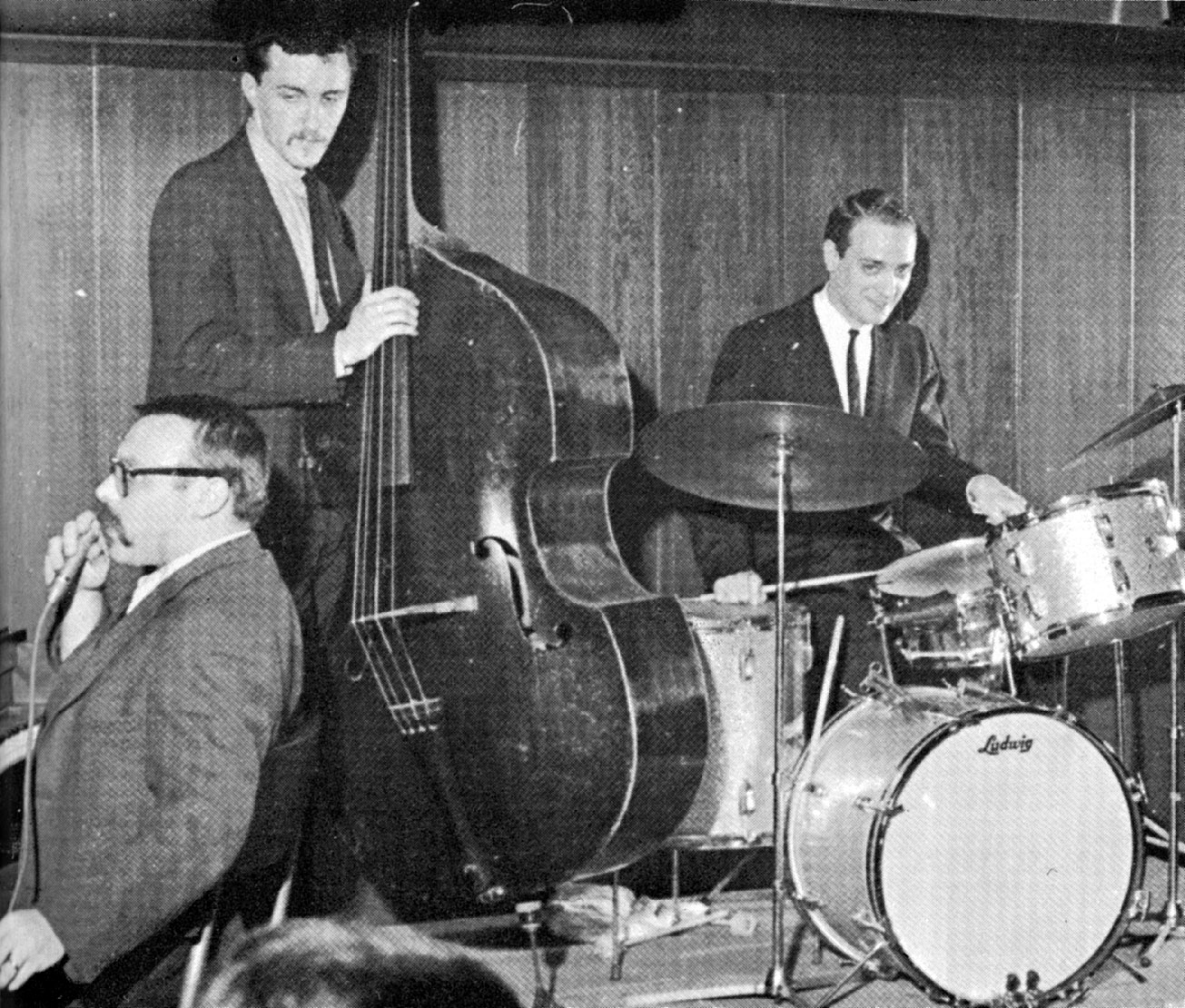
Guaraldi (left), Fred Marshall (center), and Jerry Granelli (right) performing as the Vince Guaraldi Trio in 1963. Marshall and Granelli later performed on music recorded for A Charlie Brown Christmas.

The iconic dance sequence in A Charlie Brown Christmas. "Linus and Lucy" gained its greatest exposure through the special and became closely identified with the scene.

A Charlie Brown Christmas was recorded in six sessions over six weeks, from September 17 to October 28, 1965. The sessions included alternate takes, studio chatter, and changes in personnel as Guaraldi refined the material. Because Guaraldi did not consistently document his session players, some musician credits remain uncertain. Bassists Monty Budwig and Fred Marshall and drummers Colin Bailey and Jerry Granelli are known to have taken part in the recording process. Fantasy later suggested that recordings featuring Budwig and Bailey were used in the television special, while Marshall and Granelli played on the album. Other musicians, including bassists Eugene Firth and Al Obidinski and drummers Paul Distel and Benny Barth, have also been associated with the sessions. Firth and Distel appear on a studio-session report Guaraldi filed with the American Federation of Musicians.

The earliest instrumental material was recorded at Whitney Studio in Glendale, California, on March 6, 1965. Guaraldi also reused "Linus and Lucy", first recorded on October 26, 1964, with Budwig and Bailey for Jazz Impressions of A Boy Named Charlie Brown. That earlier recording appears on the soundtrack album. The version heard in the television special was recorded on September 17, 1965, with Marshall and Granelli.

Guaraldi wrote two principal new pieces for the special: "Skating" and "Christmas Time Is Here". Their restrained jazz style helped establish the tone of the production and became central to the album's later reputation.

"Skating" required several takes before Guaraldi settled on the released version. The trio worked through difficulties with the rhythm and the piece's distinctive keyboard figure before completing the take used on the album, which fades out at the end.

"Christmas Time Is Here", originally titled "Snow Waltz", was first recorded as an instrumental. The final album take runs approximately six minutes. A vocal version, with lyrics by Mendelson, was later recorded by the St. Paul's Episcopal Church choir. The choir, directed by Barry Mineah, had previously performed with Guaraldi at Grace Cathedral. Its recordings for the special included "Christmas Time Is Here" and Felix Mendelssohn's "Hark! The Herald Angels Sing". The broadcast version of "Christmas Time Is Here (Vocal)", which runs 2:23, was not included on the original album and appears in the 1965 print with the opening Coca-Cola sponsorship segment.

The children's vocal sessions took place at Fantasy Studios in late autumn 1965. The sessions were spread across multiple evenings, and different children were used because some parents did not permit their children to return for later recording dates. Mineah sought a polished choral performance, while Mendelson and Guaraldi preferred a more natural sound. The final special used a slightly off-key performance of "Hark! The Herald Angels Sing". The children also recorded the closing line, "Merry Christmas, Charlie Brown!" They were paid five dollars each. One choir member, Candace Hackett Shively, later became an elementary school teacher and recalled sharing memories of the sessions with her students during the holidays.

Guaraldi's arrangement of "O Tannenbaum" is heard during the scene in which Charlie Brown and Linus shop for a Christmas tree.

Guaraldi's arrangement of the German carol "O Tannenbaum" preserved the melody while allowing room for jazz improvisation. A longer version, approximately five minutes in length, was included on the album. Shorter takes were also recorded for the special, including one used as Charlie Brown leaves the school theater with his small Christmas tree.

"Christmas Is Coming" originated as "Track Meet", recorded on July 29, 1965 and later released on Charlie Brown's Holiday Hits. The Christmas version required several attempts before the trio completed the take used on the soundtrack. The piece's bossa nova rhythm became one of the album's livelier cues.

Later broadcasts of the special incorporated additional Guaraldi music, including "Charlie Brown Theme" and "Happiness Theme" from Jazz Impressions of A Boy Named Charlie Brown, and "Air Music (Surfin' Snoopy)" from Charlie Brown's All Stars!. These tracks were not included on the original soundtrack album. Other album tracks, including "What Child Is This/Greensleeves", "My Little Drum", and "The Christmas Song", were recorded for the LP but do not appear in the television special.

== Reception and legacy ==
Professional ratings
Review scores
| Source | Rating |
|---|---|
| AllMusic | 5/5 stars |
| Pitchfork | 8.3/10 |
| Rolling Stone | No. 4 (2019) |
| The Penguin Guide to Jazz Recordings | 4/4 stars |
| Sputnikmusic | 5/5 stars |
| Los Angeles Times | Favorable |
| GQ | Favorable |
| The Guardian | 5/5 stars |

=== Commercial performance ===
In May 2022, the Recording Industry Association of America (RIAA) certified the album quintuple platinum, representing five million units. It was the second jazz album to receive a 5× platinum certification, after Miles Davis' Kind of Blue (1959). In August 2026, the RIAA certified the album sextuple platinum, representing 6 million units in the United States. The certification made it the best-selling jazz album of all time, surpassing Kind of Blue.

A Charlie Brown Christmas first appeared on a Billboard magazine music sales chart on the week of December 19, 1987, when it debuted and peaked at No. 13 on the Billboard Christmas Albums sales chart. The album charted on the Billboard Christmas Albums chart every Christmas/holiday season from 1988 through 2003, peaking as high as No. 8 in both 2001 and 2002. The album also charted on the Billboard Top Pop Catalog Albums chart during the Christmas/holiday season every year from 1991 through 2003, peaking as high as No. 6 in 2001.

It became the first jazz soundtrack album to reach the Top 10 outside of a specialty album chart (i.e. Christmas Albums, Top Pop Catalog Albums, Kids Albums) when, in January 2021, it reached No. 10 in the Billboard 200 chart. Derrick Bang, Guaraldi historian and author of Vince Guaraldi at the Piano, noted the significance of such a "huge" accomplishment, with Guaraldi sharing top spots with Taylor Swift, Paul McCartney and Eminem.

A Charlie Brown Christmas was also the 10th best-selling holiday album of 2011, a year that marked the sixth time since 2001 that the album had ranked among the year's top 10 Christmas albums. It was also the ninth best-selling album of 2013. On November 18, 2021, it was ranked as the No. 1 Greatest Holiday 200 album of All Time by Billboard. The American singer-songwriter Aimee Mann cited A Charlie Brown Christmas as an influence on her 2006 Christmas album One More Drifter in the Snow, saying it captured the "mellow and sometimes sad mood" of the holiday season.

=== Critical reception and legacy ===
Guaraldi showed how a piano, bass and drums can capture a feeling and character in living color, particularly if those feelings are complex, conflicted or even simply too beautiful for words. It's the kind of realization that, even unconsciously, opens the door for later discoveries in Bill Evans, Thelonious Monk, Robert Glasper and everything beyond, to say nothing of all the other sounds and ensembles waiting to be heard with jazz at its pulse.

— Chris Barton of the Los Angeles Times, 2013

A Charlie Brown Christmas has been widely praised by critics, with later reviews emphasizing the close fit between Vince Guaraldi's jazz score and the understated tone of Charles M. Schulz's Peanuts characters. Shawn M. Haney of AllMusic called the album a "joyous and festive meditation for the holiday season", writing that Guaraldi's arrangements reflected the spirit and mood of Schulz's work. Dominique Leone of Pitchfork described the songs as "small, observant miracles", noting that even the album's quieter passages retained a sense of warmth.

The soundtrack has often been singled out for bringing a more reflective tone to Christmas music. In a 50th-anniversary retrospective for Pitchfork, Ron Hart wrote that Guaraldi's music helped give the television special much of its emotional character and distinguished it from more conventional holiday programming. Josiah Gogarty of GQ argued that the album endured because it reflected the mixed emotions of the holiday season rather than treating Christmas as purely sentimental. Alexis Petridis of the The Guardian called it a "low-key masterpiece".

The album's reputation continued to grow after its original release. It was inducted into the Grammy Hall of Fame in 2007 and added to the Library of Congress's National Recording Registry in 2012. In 2019, Rolling Stone ranked it fourth on its list of the 25 greatest Christmas albums of all time.

=== Cultural impact ===
The album has been credited with introducing jazz to generations of listeners. Chris Barton of the Los Angeles Times wrote that the soundtrack exposed more people to jazz than many recordings by the genre's best-known artists, including Miles Davis and John Coltrane. Anna Holmes of The Atlantic later described the album as a lasting entry point into jazz for listeners who first encountered Guaraldi's music through the annual broadcasts of the television special.

Several musicians have cited Guaraldi's Peanuts music as an influence. Pianist David Benoit has said that hearing Guaraldi's music as a child helped shape his later interest in jazz, and pianist George Winston recorded the tribute album Linus and Lucy: The Music of Vince Guaraldi after being drawn to Guaraldi's work. The soundtrack's association with the Peanuts characters also helped make "Linus and Lucy" one of Guaraldi's most recognizable compositions.

The soundtrack became closely tied to the American Christmas season through repeated broadcasts of the television special and the album's continued seasonal popularity. Billboard ranked it the No. 1 Greatest of All Time Holiday 200 album in 2021, reflecting its long-running commercial presence during the holiday season.

== Reissues ==
The album was reissued on compact disc in 1986 with a new mastering by George Horn. In 1988, a 12th track entitled "Greensleeves" was added to the CD and would remain in the album's standard track lineup until the 2022 reissue.

In 2006 the album faced controversy as several tracks were replaced with alternate and extended versions during its remastering. "Linus and Lucy" remained a notable example as it was replaced with its 1965 television performance rather than the album performance previously issued on the 1964 album Jazz Impressions of A Boy Named Charlie Brown. In addition, several previously unreleased alternate takes were also included and identified as such. Due to the controversy, Fantasy Records would quickly replace the album with a reversion to the original album's mastering and track order, with a disc replacement program extending into March 2007.

In 2012 the album was remastered once more, this time including two bonus tracks of "The Great Pumpkin Waltz" and "Thanksgiving Theme" (both sourced from their respective mono television soundtracks) carried over from Charlie Brown's Holiday Hits (1998).

In 2022, Craft Recordings embarked on a major reissue campaign in a variety of expanded, deluxe editions. These sets feature a new stereo mix completed by Paul Blakemore, the original 1965 stereo mix, and up to 50 previously unreleased outtakes from five separate recording sessions. The three editions are a single LP vinyl edition, comprising the original 1965 stereo release offered in gold foil sleeved with embossing details (released September 22, 2022); two-disc LP vinyl and CD expanded editions, containing the 2022 stereo mix and 13 outtakes from the original recording sessions (released December 2, 2022); and a five-disc super deluxe edition, which adds three CDs of complete Autumn 1965 recording sessions and a Blu-ray audio disc containing high-resolution audio and Dolby Atmos mixes (released December 2, 2022).

== Track listing ==
=== Original 1965 release ===
All tracks are written by Vince Guaraldi, except where noted

Side One
| No. | Title | Writer(s) | Length |
|---|---|---|---|
| 1. | "O Tannenbaum" | Ernst Anschütz | 5:08 |
| 2. | "What Child Is This" | William Chatterton Dix | 2:25 |
| 3. | "My Little Drum" | | 3:12 |
| 4. | "Linus and Lucy ^{[a]}" | | 3:06 |
| 5. | "Christmas Time Is Here" (instrumental) | | 6:05 |
| Total length: | | | 19:56 |

Side Two
| No. | Title | Writer(s) | Length |
|---|---|---|---|
| 6. | "Christmas Time Is Here" (vocal) | Vince Guaraldi; Lee Mendelson | 2:47 |
| 7. | "Skating" | | 2:27 |
| 8. | "Hark! The Herald Angels Sing" | Felix Mendelssohn; Charles Wesley | 1:55 |
| 9. | "Christmas Is Coming" | | 3:25 |
| 10. | "Für Elise" | Ludwig van Beethoven | 1:06 |
| 11. | "The Christmas Song" | Mel Tormé; Robert Wells | 3:17 |
| Total length: | | | 14:57 |

=== 1988 CD release ===
| No. | Title | Writer(s) | Length |
|---|---|---|---|
| 12. | "Greensleeves" | Traditional English; arr. by Vince Guaraldi | 5:25 |
| Total length: | | | 40:23 |

=== 2006 CD remaster ===
| No. | Title | Writer(s) | Length |
|---|---|---|---|
| 13. | "Christmas is Coming" (alternate take 1) | | 4:37 |
| 14. | "The Christmas Song" (alternate take 3) | Mel Tormé; Robert Wells | 3:53 |
| 15. | "Greensleeves" (alternate take 6) | Traditional English; arr. by Vince Guaraldi | 5:05 |
| 16. | "Christmas Time Is Here" (alternate vocal take) | Vince Guaraldi; Lee Mendelson | 1:34 |
| Total length: | | | 55:57 |

=== 2012 CD remaster ===
| No. | Title | Length |
|---|---|---|
| 13. | "The Great Pumpkin Waltz^{[b]}" | 2:29 |
| 14. | "Thanksgiving Theme^{[b]}" | 2:00 |
| Total length: | | 44:51 |

=== 2022 Deluxe edition ===
CD 1: 2022 Stereo remix (1-11), 1965 original Stereo mix (12-22)
| No. | Title | Writer(s) | Length |
|---|---|---|---|
| 1. | "O Tannenbaum" (2022 Stereo remix) | Ernst Anschütz | 5:08 |
| 2. | "What Child Is This" (2022 Stereo remix) | William Chatterton Dix | 2:25 |
| 3. | "My Little Drum" (2022 Stereo remix) | | 3:12 |
| 4. | "Linus and Lucy" (2022 Stereo remix) | | 3:06 |
| 5. | "Christmas Time Is Here (instrumental)" (2022 Stereo remix) | | 6:05 |
| 6. | "Christmas Time Is Here (vocal)" (2022 Stereo remix) | Vince Guaraldi; Lee Mendelson | 2:47 |
| 7. | "Skating" (2022 Stereo remix) | | 2:27 |
| 8. | "Hark! The Herald Angels Sing" (2022 Stereo remix) | Felix Mendelssohn; Charles Wesley | 1:55 |
| 9. | "Christmas Is Coming" (2022 Stereo remix) | | 3:25 |
| 10. | "Für Elise" (2022 Stereo remix) | Ludwig van Beethoven | 1:06 |
| 11. | "The Christmas Song" (2022 Stereo remix) | Mel Tormé; Robert Wells | 3:17 |
| 12. | "O Tannenbaum" (original 1965 Stereo mix) | Ernst Anschütz | 5:08 |
| 13. | "What Child Is This" (original 1965 Stereo mix) | William Chatterton Dix | 2:25 |
| 14. | "My Little Drum" (original 1965 Stereo mix) | | 3:12 |
| 15. | "Linus and Lucy" (original 1965 Stereo mix) | | 3:06 |
| 16. | "Christmas Time Is Here (instrumental)" (original 1965 Stereo mix) | | 6:05 |
| 17. | "Christmas Time Is Here (vocal)" (original 1965 Stereo mix) | Vince Guaraldi; Lee Mendelson | 2:47 |
| 18. | "Skating" (original 1965 Stereo mix) | | 2:27 |
| 19. | "Hark! The Herald Angels Sing" (original 1965 Stereo mix) | Felix Mendelssohn; Charles Wesley | 1:55 |
| 20. | "Christmas Is Coming" (original 1965 Stereo mix) | | 3:25 |
| 21. | "Für Elise" (original 1965 Stereo mix) | Ludwig van Beethoven | 1:06 |
| 22. | "The Christmas Song" (original 1965 Stereo mix) | Mel Tormé; Robert Wells | 3:17 |
| Total length: | | | 69:46 |

CD 2: The Recording Sessions (September 17, 1965)
| No. | Title | Length |
|---|---|---|
| 1. | "Christmas Is Coming" (#1, Take 1) | 2:13 |
| 2. | "Christmas Is Coming" (#1, Take 2) | 2:52 |
| 3. | "Christmas Is Coming" (#1, Take 3) | 3:53 |
| 4. | "Christmas Is Coming" (#1, Takes 4–5) | 3:07 |
| 5. | "Christmas Is Coming" (#1, Take 6) | 3:24 |
| 6. | "Christmas Is Coming^{[d]}" (#1, Take 7) | 2:49 |
| 7. | "Christmas Time Is Here (instrumental)" (#2, Takes 1–2) | 3:02 |
| 8. | "Christmas Time Is Here (instrumental)^{[d]}" (#2, Take 3) | 2:26 |
| 9. | "Skating" (Unnumbered) | 2:18 |
| 10. | "Skating" (#3, Takes 1–2) | 3:36 |
| 11. | "Skating" (#3, Take 3) | 3:19 |
| 12. | "Skating" (#3, Takes 4–6) | 1:32 |
| 13. | "Skating^{[c]}^{[d]}" (#3, Take 7) | 2:44 |
| 14. | "Linus and Lucy^{[d]}^{[f]}" (#4, Take 1) | 3:30 |
| 15. | "Christmas Is Coming" (#5, Take 1) | 5:19 |
| 16. | "Christmas Is Coming" (#5, Take 2) | 2:58 |
| 17. | "Christmas Is Coming" (#5, Take 3) | 3:53 |
| 18. | "Christmas Is Coming" (#5, Take 4^{[c]}) | 3:33 |
| 19. | "Christmas Time Is Here (instrumental)" (#6, Take 1) | 1:10 |
| 20. | "Christmas Time Is Here (instrumental)^{[c]}" (#6, Take 2) | 6:14 |
| Total length: | | 63:52 |

CD 3: The Recording Sessions (September 21-22, 1965/Recording Date Unknown)
| No. | Title | Writer(s) | Length |
|---|---|---|---|
| 1. | "Christmas Is Coming^{[f]}" (#1, Take 1) | | 3:54 |
| 2. | "Christmas Is Coming" (#1, Take 2) | | 3:29 |
| 3. | "Christmas Is Coming" (#1, Take 3) | | 3:05 |
| 4. | "Christmas Is Coming" (#1, Takes 4–6) | | 1:37 |
| 5. | "Christmas Is Coming" (#1, Take 7) | | 3:05 |
| 6. | "O Tannenbaum^{[c]}^{[d]}" (#2, Take 1) | Ernst Anschütz | 5:36 |
| 7. | "O Tannenbaum" (#2, Take 2) | Ernst Anschütz | 1:04 |
| 8. | "O Tannenbaum" (#2, Take 3–4) | Ernst Anschütz | 1:11 |
| 9. | "O Tannenbaum^{[d]}" (#2, Take 5) | Ernst Anschütz | 1:03 |
| 10. | "Jingle Bells^{[d]}" (#3, Takes 1–4) | James Lord Pierpont | 1:42 |
| 11. | "Goin' Out of My Head" (Unnumbered) | Teddy Randazzo; Bobby Weinstein | 0:24 |
| 12. | "Christmas Time Is Here (instrumental)" (#6, Take 3) | | 7:21 |
| 13. | "Skating" (#7, Take 1) | | 4:20 |
| 14. | "Skating" (#7, Take 2) | | 4:05 |
| 15. | "Für Elise^{[c]}^{[d]}" (Takes 1–2) | Ludwig van Beethoven | 1:52 |
| 16. | "Christmas Time Is Here (vocal)" (#1, Take 1) | Vince Guaraldi; Lee Mendelson | 1:32 |
| 17. | "Christmas Time Is Here (vocal)" (#1, Takes 2–3) | Vince Guaraldi; Lee Mendelson | 0:37 |
| 18. | "Christmas Time Is Here (vocal)" (#1, Take 4) | Vince Guaraldi; Lee Mendelson | 1:32 |
| 19. | "Christmas Time Is Here (vocal)^{[f]}" (#1, Take 5) | Vince Guaraldi; Lee Mendelson | 1:35 |
| 20. | "Christmas Time Is Here (vocal)" (Rehearsal) | Vince Guaraldi; Lee Mendelson | 0:24 |
| 21. | "Christmas Time Is Here (vocal)" (#1, Take 6) | Vince Guaraldi; Lee Mendelson | 1:00 |
| 22. | "Christmas Time Is Here (vocal)^{[c]}" (#1, Take 7) | Vince Guaraldi; Lee Mendelson | 2:55 |
| Total length: | | | 53:23 |

CD 4: The Recording Sessions (October 28, 1965)
| No. | Title | Writer(s) | Length |
|---|---|---|---|
| 1. | "Greensleeves" (Take 1) | Traditional English; arr. by Vince Guaraldi | 1:30 |
| 2. | "Greensleeves" (Takes 2–4) | Traditional English; arr. by Vince Guaraldi | 1:02 |
| 3. | "Greensleeves" (Take 5) | Traditional English; arr. by Vince Guaraldi | 6:07 |
| 4. | "Greensleeves^{[f]}" (Take 6) | Traditional English; arr. by Vince Guaraldi | 5:41 |
| 5. | "Greensleeves^{[e]}" (Take 7) | Traditional English; arr. by Vince Guaraldi | 5:36 |
| 6. | "Greensleeves^{[f]}" (Take 8) | Traditional English; arr. by Vince Guaraldi | 5:40 |
| 7. | "Greensleeves" (Takes 9–10) | Traditional English; arr. by Vince Guaraldi | 1:24 |
| 8. | "Greensleeves" (Take 11) | Traditional English; arr. by Vince Guaraldi | 2:42 |
| 9. | "Greensleeves^{[c]}^{[g]}" (Take 12) | Traditional English; arr. by Vince Guaraldi | 2:30 |
| 10. | "The Christmas Song" (Take 1) | Mel Tormé; Robert Wells | 3:28 |
| 11. | "The Christmas Song ^{[f]}" (Takes 2–3) | Mel Tormé; Robert Wells | 4:11 |
| 12. | "The Christmas Song" (Takes 4–7) | Mel Tormé; Robert Wells | 1:40 |
| 13. | "The Christmas Song" (Take 8) | Mel Tormé; Robert Wells | 1:51 |
| 14. | "The Christmas Song^{[c]}" (Take 9) | Mel Tormé; Robert Wells | 3:20 |
| 15. | "The Christmas Song" (Take 10) | Mel Tormé; Robert Wells | 3:12 |
| 16. | "The Christmas Song" (Take 11) | Mel Tormé; Robert Wells | 3:19 |
| Total length: | | | 53:13 |

Disc 5: Blu-ray audio
| No. | Title | Length |
|---|---|---|
| 1. | "A Charlie Brown Christmas (2022 Stereo Mix) (High-resolution audio)" | 31:46 |
| 2. | "A Charlie Brown Christmas (2022 Dolby Atmos Mix)" | 31:46 |
| Total length: | | 63:32 |

Notes

- ^{^[a]} previously released on Jazz Impressions of A Boy Named Charlie Brown (1964)
- ^{^[b]} sourced from mono television soundtracks of It's the Great Pumpkin, Charlie Brown and A Charlie Brown Thanksgiving; previously released on Charlie Brown's Holiday Hits (1998)
- ^{^[c]} take utilized in soundtrack release
- ^{^[d]} take utilized in television special
- ^{^[e]} previously released on 1988 reissue
- ^{^[f]} previously released on 2006 reissue
- ^{^[g]} retitled "What Child Is This?" on original album release

== Personnel ==
Vince Guaraldi Trio

- Vince Guaraldi – piano, bandleader, Hammond organ on "Hark, The Herald Angels Sing"
- Fred Marshall – double bass
- Monty Budwig – double bass ("Linus and Lucy", "Greensleeves")
- Jerry Granelli – drums
- Colin Bailey – drums ("Linus and Lucy", "Greensleeves")

Original production

- Soul S. Weiss – recording engineer

Production

- Ralph J. Gleason – liner notes
- Joel Selvin – liner notes (2006 reissue)
- Derrick Bang - liner notes (2012, 2022 reissues)
- George Horn – mastering (1986, 1988, 2006 reissues)
- Stephen Hart – mixing (2006 reissue)
- Adam Munoz – mixing (2012 reissue)
- Joe Tarantino – mastering (2012 reissue)
- Cheryl Pawelski — producer (2006 reissue)
- Nick Phillips – producer (2012 reissue)
- Mark Piro - producer (2022 reissue)
- Joe Tarantino – remastering
- Paul Blakemore – mixing (2022 reissue)

== Charts ==
=== Weekly charts ===
Weekly chart performance for A Charlie Brown Christmas
| Chart (2007–2026) | Peak position |
|---|---|
| Australian Jazz & Blues Albums (ARIA) | 8 |
| Canadian Albums (Billboard) | 6 |
| Lithuanian Albums (AGATA) | 87 |
| Scottish Albums (Official Charts) | 59 |
| Swedish Jazz Albums (Sverigetopplistan) | 2 |
| Swiss Albums (Schweizer Hitparade) | 91 |
| UK Albums (Official Charts) | 71 |
| UK Jazz & Blues Albums (Official Charts) | 1 |
| UK Soundtrack Albums (Official Charts) | 3 |
| US Billboard 200 | 6 |
| US Independent Albums (Billboard) | 1 |
| US Kid Albums (Billboard) | 1 |
| US Soundtrack Albums (Billboard) | 1 |
| US Top Holiday Albums (Billboard) | 2 |
| US Top Jazz Albums (Billboard) | 2 |
| US Top Traditional Jazz Albums (Billboard) | 2 |

Weekly chart performance for A Charlie Brown Christmas: 2007 Collector's Edition
| Chart (2007) | Peak position |
|---|---|
| US Kid Albums (Billboard) | 17 |
| US Soundtrack Albums (Billboard) | 21 |
| US Top Holiday Albums (Billboard) | 40 |

=== Year-end charts ===
Year-end chart performance for A Charlie Brown Christmas
| Chart | Year | Position |
|---|---|---|
| US Soundtrack Albums (Billboard) | 2006 | 15 |
| US Soundtrack Albums (Billboard) | 2007 | 11 |
| US Soundtrack Albums (Billboard) | 2008 | 20 |
| US Soundtrack Albums (Billboard) | 2009 | 10 |
| US Billboard 200 | 2011 | 188 |
| US Soundtrack Albums (Billboard) | 2011 | 14 |
| US Billboard 200 | 2012 | 175 |
| US Soundtrack Albums (Billboard) | 2012 | 12 |
| US Soundtrack Albums (Billboard) | 2013 | 11 |
| US Billboard 200 | 2014 | 182 |
| US Soundtrack Albums (Billboard) | 2014 | 7 |
| US Soundtrack Albums (Billboard) | 2015 | 19 |
| US Soundtrack Albums (Billboard) | 2016 | 8 |
| US Soundtrack Albums (Billboard) | 2017 | 15 |
| US Soundtrack Albums (Billboard) | 2018 | 23 |
| US Soundtrack Albums (Billboard) | 2019 | 14 |
| US Billboard 200 | 2020 | 198 |
| US Soundtrack Albums (Billboard) | 2020 | 15 |
| US Top Jazz Albums (Billboard) | 2020 | 13 |
| US Billboard 200 | 2021 | 184 |
| US Soundtrack Albums (Billboard) | 2021 | 6 |
| US Top Jazz Albums (Billboard) | 2021 | 3 |
| US Billboard 200 | 2022 | 173 |
| US Soundtrack Albums (Billboard) | 2022 | 6 |
| US Top Jazz Albums (Billboard) | 2022 | 2 |
| US Billboard 200 | 2023 | 184 |
| US Soundtrack Albums (Billboard) | 2023 | 7 |
| US Top Jazz Albums (Billboard) | 2023 | 2 |
| US Soundtrack Albums (Billboard) | 2024 | 8 |
| US Top Jazz Albums (Billboard) | 2024 | 5 |
| US Billboard 200 | 2025 | 198 |
| US Soundtrack Albums (Billboard) | 2025 | 10 |
| US Top Jazz Albums (Billboard) | 2025 | 6 |

== Certifications ==
Certifications for A Charlie Brown Christmas
| Region | Certification | Certified units/sales |
|---|---|---|
| Canada (Music Canada) | 2× Platinum | 200,000^{‡} |
| United States (RIAA) | 6× Platinum | 6,000,000^{‡} |
^{‡} Sales+streaming figures based on certification alone.

== See also ==
- Bill Melendez
- Lee Mendelson Film Productions
- Vince Guaraldi discography
- List of songs recorded by Vince Guaraldi
- Peanuts filmography
- It's the Great Pumpkin, Charlie Brown (soundtrack) (1966)
- A Charlie Brown Thanksgiving (soundtrack) (1973)

== Sources ==
- Bang, Derrick (2012). Vince Guaraldi at the Piano. McFarland. ISBN 978-0-7864-5902-5. Archived from the original on January 20, 2022.
- Mendelson, Lee (2013). A Charlie Brown Christmas: The Making of a Tradition. It Books. ISBN 978-0-06-227214-0. Archived from the original on January 20, 2022.
- Solomon, Charles (2013). The Art and Making of Peanuts Animation: Celebrating Fifty Years of Television Specials. Chronicle Books. ISBN 978-1-4521-1091-2. Archived from the original on January 20, 2022.
