= Alma-Ville =

Studio album by Vince Guaraldi
- Released: December 1969
- Recorded: October 1969
- Studios: Amigo Studios, North Hollywood, Los Angeles, California
- Genres: Jazz pop; Jazz fusion; Latin jazz
- Length: 43:44
- Label: Warner Bros.-Seven Arts
- Producer: Shorty Rogers

Vince Guaraldi chronology
| The Eclectic Vince Guaraldi (1969) | Alma-Ville (1969) | A Boy Named Charlie Brown: Selections from the Film Soundtrack (1970) |

Professional ratings
Review scores
| Source | Rating |
|---|---|
| AllMusic | 4/5 stars |
| Five Cents Please | 5/5 stars |

Alma-Ville is the 12th and final studio album by American jazz pianist Vince Guaraldi, released in the U.S. by Warner Bros.-Seven Arts in December 1969.

== Background and recording ==
Vince Guaraldi's final three albums, produced under Warner Bros.-Seven Arts, represent a pivotal period in his career following an extended effort to sever ties with Fantasy Records. Upon securing a three-album contract with Warner, Guaraldi’s inaugural release, Oh Good Grief!, adhered to the label's directive to revisit and re-record eight of his most prominent Peanuts scores. This was succeeded by The Eclectic Vince Guaraldi, a self-produced endeavor in which Guaraldi exercised complete artistic autonomy. However, the album was criticized for its lack of focus and artistic overindulgence, resulting in an unfavorable reception from both critics and the public.

For his third and final Warner release, Alma-Ville, the label enlisted the expertise of renowned jazz trumpeter and arranger Shorty Rogers to assume production responsibilities. Rogers' involvement imbued the project with a greater sense of cohesion and refinement, a marked improvement over Guaraldi's prior album. Alma-Ville features a balanced repertoire of original compositions and reinterpretations of popular music, including The Beatles' "Eleanor Rigby," which Guaraldi frequently performed in live settings. The album’s title track is a reimagining of a composition first introduced in his Jazz Impressions of Black Orpheus (1962).

The recording process for Alma-Ville was extensive, employing various musicians depending on the stylistic demands of individual tracks. Guaraldi collaborated with sidemen such as Eddie Duran, Kelly Bryan, and Al Coster on pieces like the vibrant "Masked Marvel" and a bossa nova arrangement of Duke Pearson's "Cristo Redentor." Additionally, Guaraldi recorded with a trio composed of Sebastião Neto, Dom Um Romão, and Rubens Bassini for rhythmically intricate tracks like "Rio from the Air." A reunion with longtime collaborators Monty Budwig, Colin Bailey, and Herb Ellis yielded notable contributions, including the re-recorded title track "Alma-Ville" and the track "Detained in San Ysidro."

== Reception ==
Despite its more structured production and artistic refinement compared to The Eclectic Vince Guaraldi, Alma-Ville did not garner significant critical or commercial acclaim. While reviewers acknowledged the album's technical proficiency and diversity, it did not succeed in expanding Guaraldi’s audience beyond his dedicated fan base. Reviews were generally positive but understated, with the album being recognized as a solid, if not groundbreaking, work from a musician whose major contributions to jazz were already established. Both The Eclectic Vince Guaraldi and Alma-Ville gradually faded into relative obscurity for many years, whereas Oh Good Grief! maintained its presence in circulation and continued to sell consistently, largely owing to the enduring popularity of the Peanuts franchise.

A remastered edition of Alma-Ville was released on July 6, 2018, by Omnivore Recordings as part of the 2-CD set The Complete Warner Bros.–Seven Arts Recordings.

== Track listing ==
All tracks are written by Vince Guaraldi, except where noted.

Side One
| No. | Title | Writer(s) | Notes | Length |
|---|---|---|---|---|
| 1. | "The Masked Marvel" | | Featured in the Peanuts prime-time television special It Was a Short Summer, Charlie Brown (1969); re-released on North Beach (2006) with extended fade-out | 5:20 |
| 2. | "Cristo Redentor" | Duke Pearson | | 4:51 |
| 3. | "Detained in San Ysidro" | | | 3:33 |
| 4. | "Eleanor Rigby" | John Lennon; Paul McCartney | new recording; original version released on Vince Guaraldi with the San Francisco Boys Chorus (1967) | 5:13 |
| 5. | "Uno y Uno" | | | 2:14 |

Side Two
| No. | Title | Writer(s) | Notes | Length |
|---|---|---|---|---|
| 6. | "Alma-Ville" | | new recording; original version released on Jazz Impressions of Black Orpheus (1962) | 4:35 |
| 7. | "Rio from the Air" | | | 6:15 |
| 8. | "Watch What Happens" (from the film The Umbrellas of Cherbourg) | Norman Gimbel; Antoine Le Grand | | 4:14 |
| 9. | "Jambo’s" | | new recording; original version released as "Casaba" with Bola Sete on Vince Guaraldi, Bola Sete and Friends (1964) | 7:29 |
| Total length: | | | | 43:44 |

== Session information ==
Credits adapted from remastered 2018 CD liner notes.

"The Masked Marvel"

- Written by Vince Guaraldi
- Piano: Vince Guaraldi
- Guitar: Eddie Duran
- Double bass: Kelly Bryan
- Drums: Al Coster
- Recorded in mid-to-late October 1969

"Cristo Redentor"

- Written by Duke Pearson
- Piano: Vince Guaraldi
- Guitar: Eddie Duran
- Double bass: Kelly Bryan
- Drums: Al Coster
- Recorded in mid-to-late October 1969

"Detained in San Ysidro"

- Written by Vince Guaraldi
- Piano: Vince Guaraldi
- Guitar: Herb Ellis
- Double bass: Monty Budwig
- Drums: Colin Bailey
- Recorded on October 10, 1969

"Eleanor Rigby"

- Written by John Lennon and Paul McCartney
- Piano: Vince Guaraldi
- Guitar: Herb Ellis
- Double bass: Monty Budwig
- Drums: Colin Bailey
- Recorded in mid-to-late October 1969

"Uno y Uno"

- Written by Vince Guaraldi
- Piano, lead guitar: Vince Guaraldi
- Double bass: Kelly Bryan
- Drums: Al Coster
- Recorded in mid-to-late October 1969

"Alma-Ville"

- Written by Vince Guaraldi
- Piano: Vince Guaraldi
- Guitar: Herb Ellis
- Double bass: Monty Budwig
- Drums: Colin Bailey
- Recorded on October 10, 1969

"Rio from the Air"

- Written by Vince Guaraldi
- Piano, guitar: Vince Guaraldi
- Electric bass: Sebastião Neto
- Drums: Dom Um Romão
- Percussion: Rubens Bassini
- Recorded in mid-to-late October 1969

"Watch What Happens"

- Written by Norman Gimbel and Antoine Le Grand
- Piano: Vince Guaraldi
- Guitar: Eddie Duran
- Double bass: Kelly Bryan
- Drums: Al Coster
- Recorded in mid-to-late October 1969

"Jambo’s"

- Written by Vince Guaraldi
- Piano: Vince Guaraldi
- Guitar: Herb Ellis
- Double bass: Monty Budwig
- Drums: Colin Bailey
- Percussion: Rubens Bassini
- Recorded on October 10, 1969

== See also ==
- Vince Guaraldi discography
- List of songs recorded by Vince Guaraldi
- List of cover versions of Vince Guaraldi songs
- Lee Mendelson Film Productions
