= It's the Great Pumpkin, Charlie Brown (soundtrack) =

Soundtrack album by Vince Guaraldi

It's the Great Pumpkin, Charlie Brown: Original Soundtrack Recording
- 2022 master-recording edition

Soundtrack album by Vince Guaraldi
- Released: October 5, 2018 (television-soundtrack edition); August 26, 2022 (master-recording edition)
- Recorded: October 4, 1966
- Studios: Gower Street Studio, Desilu Productions, Hollywood
- Genres: Jazz; soundtrack
- Length: 20:17 (2018); 30:10 (2022)
- Label: Craft Recordings
- Producers: Bill Belmont (2018): Jason Mendelson; Sean Mendelson; Mark Piro; (2022)

Vince Guaraldi chronology
The Complete Warner Bros.–Seven Arts Recordings (2018)	It's the Great Pumpkin, Charlie Brown: Original Soundtrack Recording (2018)	A Charlie Brown Thanksgiving: Original Soundtrack Recording (2023)

Music video
- "Charlie Brown Theme (2nd Reprise)" on YouTube

It's the Great Pumpkin, Charlie Brown: Original Soundtrack Recording is a soundtrack album by American jazz pianist and composer Vince Guaraldi, presenting music written for the 1966 Peanuts television special It's the Great Pumpkin, Charlie Brown. Craft Recordings first released the album on October 5, 2018, under the subtitle Music from the Soundtrack. Because the original session tapes were then believed lost, that edition used music extracted from the completed television soundtrack and retained its edits, fades and sound effects.

After the original analog session reels were discovered in 2020, Craft issued a reconstructed edition titled Original Soundtrack Recording on August 26, 2022. It replaced most of the television-derived audio with complete master recordings and added seven alternate takes.

== Background ==
When the soundtrack was announced in 2018, the original session tapes were not available. Concord Music therefore assembled the album from the finished television soundtrack, removing the dialogue while retaining the edits, fades and sound effects incorporated into the special.

Following producer Lee Mendelson's death in December 2019, his children searched the archives for original music recordings from the Peanuts television specials. During the COVID-19 lockdowns in 2020, they discovered the original analog reels in boxes labeled "Big Pumpkin Charlie Brown", the special's working title. The tapes contained recordings from the October 4, 1966 session, including complete cues and several alternate takes.

Several cues recorded after the October 4 session were not found, including "Snoopy and the Leaf", "Military Drum March", "Fanfare", "Breathless", "Graveyard Theme (Trick or Treat)" and the third reprise of "Linus and Lucy". These selections continued to be sourced from the monaural television soundtrack for the 2022 edition.

The surviving quarter-inch tapes contained complete, unedited monaural recordings. They were transferred at 192 kHz/24-bit, preserving performances that had been shortened, faded or otherwise edited when synchronized with the television special.

== Recording session ==
The score for Great Pumpkin was recorded at Desilu's Gower Street Studio in Hollywood on October 4, 1966. Guaraldi led a sextet comprising Monty Budwig on double bass, Colin Bailey on drums, Mannie Klein on trumpet, John Gray on guitar and Ronnie Lang on woodwinds. Budwig and Bailey had previously worked with Guaraldi on music for A Charlie Brown Christmas and the unaired documentary A Boy Named Charlie Brown.

Composer, arranger and conductor John Scott Trotter supervised the session. Unlike Guaraldi's earlier Peanuts scores, which often required extended performances to be shortened or faded to match the animation, the Great Pumpkin cues were structured more closely around the duration of individual scenes.

The score incorporated previously composed Guaraldi themes including "Linus and Lucy", "Charlie Brown Theme" and "Frieda (With the Naturally Curly Hair)", alongside new material such as "Great Pumpkin Waltz", "The Red Baron" and "Graveyard Theme". The latter developed from a theme Guaraldi had recorded privately in 1958. Multiple takes were recorded for several cues, with surviving versions of "Linus and Lucy" and "Graveyard Theme" featuring variations in tempo and instrumentation, including different uses of flute, trumpet and guitar.

Bailey later recalled that the musicians received little or no rehearsal and worked primarily from lead sheets. Although he had been unfamiliar with Peanuts when the session took place, he remembered Guaraldi as a generous bandleader who allowed the musicians flexibility during recording.

== Release history ==
The soundtrack was first released by Craft Recordings on October 5, 2018, in CD and digital formats. Subtitled Music from the Soundtrack, the album was assembled from the finished television soundtrack because the original session reels were then believed to be lost. Dialogue was removed, but the recordings retained the edits, fades and sound effects incorporated into the television special.

The 2018 edition received its first vinyl release on August 30, 2019. Craft issued a standard black pressing and a store-exclusive glow-in-the-dark pressing limited to 500 copies; both featured an etched image of a pumpkin on the second side. An orange pumpkin-shaped 45-rpm pressing followed on September 17, 2021.

After the original analog session reels were located, Craft released a substantially reconstructed edition on August 26, 2022. Subtitled Original Soundtrack Recording, it replaced most of the television-derived audio with complete performances transferred from the session masters and added seven alternate takes. Cues for which no master recording could be located continued to be sourced from the television soundtrack. The edition appeared digitally and on CD, a standard 45-rpm black vinyl LP, a 33⅓-rpm translucent orange pumpkin-shaped disc, and a Craft-exclusive 45-rpm "Pumpkin Patch" splatter pressing limited to 500 copies.

For the special's 60th anniversary, Craft issued a four-inch orange "tiny vinyl" single on July 17, 2026, coupling "The Great Pumpkin Waltz" with "Graveyard Theme". A 45-rpm zoetrope picture-disc edition of the complete album followed on August 7. On August 21, Craft released additional pumpkin-shaped editions in "Electric Pumpkin Patch", "Pumpkin Spice", "Ghost White" and "Candy Corn" variants through Barnes & Noble, Walmart, Target and Craft Recordings, respectively, while the translucent orange version returned through general retailers.

=== Cover art ===
The 2018 and 2022 editions use the same principal cover illustration: Linus and Sally seated among pumpkins while looking toward Snoopy's silhouette against the moon. The identifying text was changed from Music from the Soundtrack on the 2018 edition to Original Soundtrack Recording on the 2022 edition, distinguishing the television-derived release from the later master-sourced reconstruction.

== Critical reception ==
Professional ratings
Review scores
Source	Rating
AllMusic	5/5 stars
All About Jazz	4/5 stars
Uncut	3.5/5 stars
Spectrum Culture	Favorable
The New York City Jazz Record	Favorable

=== 2018 edition ===
Reviews of the 2018 edition frequently distinguished between Guaraldi's score and the television-derived audio used to present it. D. W. Dunphy of MusicTAP considered the release a missed opportunity, criticizing its reliance on the monaural television soundtrack and the sound effects that remained after the dialogue was removed. Guaraldi historian Derrick Bang likewise noted that the selections retained the special's edits, fades, abrupt endings and sound effects, which he felt detracted from the music.

Other reviewers responded more favorably to the score itself. Daniel Bromfield of Spectrum Culture praised the contrast between Guaraldi's jazz themes and the more dramatic music accompanying Snoopy's World War I sequences, while Nick Spacek of Starburst regarded the album as a welcome release of music that had previously been available principally through the television special and selected compilations.

=== 2022 edition and subsequent reception ===
The 2022 release, reconstructed from the original session masters, received generally favorable reviews, with critics frequently citing the improved sound quality and the opportunity to hear Guaraldi's arrangements apart from the edits and effects used in the television soundtrack.

Mark Sullivan of All About Jazz highlighted the clarity of the master recordings, particularly Guaraldi's piano and Ronnie Lang's flute on "Linus and Lucy". He also singled out "The Great Pumpkin Waltz", noting that the extended master gives greater prominence to guitarist John Gray, and drew attention to the unusual arrangement of "Trick or Treat", which features flute, double bass and drums without Guaraldi.

Erik Adams of IndieWire praised the score's ability to evoke the atmosphere of Halloween and complement the special's shifts between Linus' belief in the Great Pumpkin, Snoopy's World War I fantasy sequences and the children's trick-or-treating. Adams particularly highlighted "The Great Pumpkin Waltz", noting Guaraldi's use of celesta and describing the piece as especially evocative of the holiday. S. Rockwood of Set the Tape similarly praised the restored audio, citing the increased clarity of the bass and treble frequencies while noting that the remaster retained the character of the original recording.

Bang regarded the score as an important step in establishing the musical identity of the Peanuts television specials. He singled out the cold-open arrangement of "Linus and Lucy", particularly Lang's flute counterpoint, as among Guaraldi's strongest versions of the composition.

Reviewing the album's 60th-anniversary reissue for The New York City Jazz Record in 2026, Patrick Romanowski described Guaraldi as working at a "creative zenith" and emphasized the score's autumnal atmosphere and frequent use of minor-key writing. He identified "The Great Pumpkin Waltz" as the album's "lyrical centerpiece", drawing attention to Lang's flute and the ensemble arrangement, and also praised the revised treatment of "Linus and Lucy".

== Track listing ==
All tracks are written by Vince Guaraldi, except where noted.

No.	Title	Writer(s)	Length
1.	"Linus and Lucy"		1:51
2.	"Graveyard Theme"		0:56
3.	"Snoopy and the Leaf"^{[a]} "Frieda (With the Naturally Curly Hair)"	John Scott Trotter ("Snoopy and the Leaf")	0:22; 0:11
4.	"The Great Pumpkin Waltz^{[b]}"		2:36
5.	"Linus and Lucy" (reprise)		0:38
6.	"Charlie Brown Theme" "Charlie Brown Theme" (minor theme) "Graveyard Theme" (reprise)	Vince Guaraldi; Lee Mendelson; ("Charlie Brown Theme")	0:16; 0:17; 0:10
7.	"The Great Pumpkin Waltz" (reprise)		2:40
8.	"The Red Baron" "Military Drum March^{[a]}"		0:40; 0:16
9.	"The Great Pumpkin Waltz" (2nd reprise) "The Great Pumpkin Waltz" (3rd reprise)		0:59; 1:02
10.	"Graveyard Theme (Trick or Treat)^{[a]}" (2nd reprise)		1:15
11.	"Fanfare"^{[a]} "Breathless"^{[a]} "Graveyard Theme (Trick or Treat)^{[a]}" (3rd reprise)	John Scott Trotter ("Breathless")	0:06; 1:15; 0:06
12.	"Charlie Brown Theme" (reprise)	Vince Guaraldi; Lee Mendelson	0:45
13.	"Breathless^{[a]}" (reprise)	John Scott Trotter	0:48
14.	"Medley: a. "It's a Long Way to Tipperary"; b. "There's a Long Long Trail A-Winding"; c. "Pack Up Your Troubles in Your Old Kit-Bag"; d. "Roses of Picardy"	Henry James "Harry" Williams; Jack Judge; Alonzo Elliot; Stoddard King; Felix Powell; George Asaf; Frederic Weatherly; Haydn Wood	1:56
15.	"Graveyard Theme (Trick or Treat)^{[a]}" (4th reprise)		0:33
16.	"Linus and Lucy" (2nd reprise) "Linus and Lucy^{[a]}" (3rd reprise)		0:17; 0:33
17.	"Charlie Brown Theme" (2nd reprise)	Vince Guaraldi; Lee Mendelson	1:31

Bonus/Alternate tracks
No.	Title	Writer(s)	Length
18.	"Linus and Lucy" (Alternate Take 1)		1:52
19.	"Graveyard Theme" (Alternate Take 1)		0:51
20.	"Charlie Brown Theme" (Alternate Reprise, Take 1)	Vince Guaraldi; Lee Mendelson	0:44
21.	"Linus and Lucy" (Alternate Take 2)		1:49
22.	"The Great Pumpkin Waltz" (Alternate Take 2)		2:41
23.	"Linus and Lucy" (Alternate Reprise, Take 1)		0:30
24.	"Charlie Brown Theme" (Alternate Reprise, Take 2)	Vince Guaraldi; Lee Mendelson	0:27
Total length:			30:10

Notes

- ^{^[a]} Master recording not on original reels; sourced from original mono television soundtrack for 2022 reissue.
- ^{^[b]} previously released on Charlie Brown's Holiday Hits (1998) using audio sourced from original mono television soundtrack

== Personnel ==
=== Musicians ===
Vince Guaraldi Sextet

- Vince Guaraldi – piano, celesta, arranger
- Mannie Klein – trumpet
- John Gray – guitar
- Ronnie Lang – woodwinds
- Monty Budwig – double bass
- Colin Bailey – drums

Additional

- John Scott Trotter – orchestrator
- Robert G. Hartley – arranger

=== Production ===
Credits adapted from 2018 and 2022 release liner notes.

- Maureen Bacon – project assistance
- Bill Belmont – producer (2018)
- Derrick Bang – liner notes
- Carrie Smith – art direction
- Chris Clough – audio supervision
- Deluxe Entertainment Services Group – tape transfer (2022)
- Vinson Hudson – restoration and mastering (2022)
- Ryan Jebavy – editorial
- Jason Mendelson – producer (2022)
- Sean Mendelson – producer (2022)
- Evelyn Mowbray – project assistance (2018)
- Mark Piro – producer
- Jeff Safran – project assistance (2022)
- Sig Sigworth – project assistance (2022)
- Joe Tarantino – mastering (2018)
- Mason Williams – project supervision
- Sean Winter – design (2018)
- Michelle Zarr – project assistance (2022)

== Charts ==
Weekly chart performance for It's the Great Pumpkin, Charlie Brown: Original Soundtrack Recording
Year	Chart	Peak position
2022	US Kid Albums (Billboard)	1
2023	US Kid Albums (Billboard)	1
2024	US Kid Albums (Billboard)	1
2024	US Top Traditional Jazz Albums (Billboard)	6
2024	US Top Jazz Albums (Billboard)	9
2025	US Kid Albums (Billboard)	4

Chart performance for "The Great Pumpkin Waltz"
Year	Chart	Peak position
2025	US iTunes Top Songs	1
2025	US Digital Song Sales (Billboard)	3

== See also ==
- Lee Mendelson Film Productions
- Bill Melendez
- Peanuts filmography
- Vince Guaraldi discography
- List of songs recorded by Vince Guaraldi
- List of cover versions of Vince Guaraldi songs
