= The Eclectic Vince Guaraldi =

Studio album by Vince Guaraldi
- Released: March 1969
- Recorded: Late 1968-Early 1969
- Studios: Golden State Studios, San Francisco, California
- Genres: Jazz pop; Rock; Jazz fusion; Soul Jazz
- Length: 45:28
- Label: Warner Bros.-Seven Arts
- Producer: Vince Guaraldi

Vince Guaraldi chronology
Oh Good Grief! (1968)	The Eclectic Vince Guaraldi (1969)	Alma-Ville (1969)

The Eclectic Vince Guaraldi is the 11th and penultimate studio album by American jazz pianist Vince Guaraldi, released in the U.S. by Warner Bros.-Seven Arts in March 1969. In a departure from his standard jazz output, Guaraldi experimented with electric keyboard and electric harpsichord in preparation of the release of the album, which he also produced and arranged.

== Background ==
Vince Guaraldi's final three albums released during his lifetime were recorded for Warner Bros.-Seven Arts after spending considerable time struggling to extricate himself from Fantasy Records. Warner signed Guaraldi to a three-record deal, and insisted that his inaugural release consist of his Peanuts songs. Guaraldi responded with new renditions of eight of his most popular scores from those programs on his first release, Oh Good Grief! in 1968.

Guaraldi was then given complete artistic control over his sophomore, self-produced Warner effort, The Eclectic Vince Guaraldi, resulting in an unfocused and overindulgent album that was not well received by both critics and consumers. Only one track, "Lucifer's Lady", would eventually be featured in the film A Boy Named Charlie Brown (1969) and the television special, Play It Again, Charlie Brown (1971).

A remastered edition of The Eclectic Vince Guaraldi was released on July 6, 2018, by Omnivore Recordings as part of the 2-CD set The Complete Warner Bros.–Seven Arts Recordings.

== Recording ==
The recording process for The Eclectic Vince Guaraldi marked a departure from his earlier work. Previously limited by the tight production schedules at Fantasy Records, Guaraldi gained more creative control after signing with Warner Bros.-Seven Arts. This allowed him to experiment with different styles, instruments, and recording techniques. Unlike his earlier albums, which were typically completed in a few sessions, The Eclectic Vince Guaraldi was recorded over several months. Guaraldi took advantage of this extended timeline to collaborate with various musicians and explore new approaches to jazz.

The album's title reflects its diverse range of genres, including traditional jazz, rock, folk, and string arrangements. Guaraldi played piano, electric harpsichord, and guitar on the album, supported by musicians such as Eddie Duran, Peter Marshall, Bob Maize, and Jerry Granelli. A string section was also added to several tracks. This experimental approach was a significant shift from his earlier, more straightforward jazz recordings. The album also marked Guaraldi's vocal debut on two tracks: "Black Sheep Boy" and "Reason to Believe," both covers of Tim Hardin songs. It featured a mix of original compositions and covers, including Ervin Drake's "It Was a Very Good Year and The Beatles’ "Yesterday".

The album exhibits a wide variety of styles, with certain tracks emphasizing jazz, while others incorporate rock or orchestral elements. Tracks such as "Lucifer's Lady" and "Coffee and Doe-Nuts" highlight Guaraldi's experimental tendencies, combining extended keyboard melodies with intense guitar solos. In contrast, the string arrangements on covers of "Yesterday" and "Nobody Else" are seen as conflicting with the jazz components, leading to a sense of stylistic inconsistency. The use of the electric harpsichord on "The Beat Goes On" was noted for its tonal limitations, as critics pointed out that the notes either abruptly stopped or sustained at a constant volume, which detracted from the overall sound.

== Critical reception ==
Professional ratings
Review scores
Source	Rating
AllMusic	3.5/5 stars
Five Cents Please	3/5 stars

The Eclectic Vince Guaraldi received mixed reviews from critics. While Guaraldi's innovative efforts were acknowledged, critics felt the album lacked cohesion and focus, with its mix of jazz, rock, and string arrangements creating a disjointed effect. Longtime Guaraldi supporter Ralph J. Gleason offered only mild praise. Warner Bros.-Seven Arts, dissatisfied with the album's commercial performance, did little to promote it, contributing to its lack of success. After the success of Oh, Good Grief!, this second Warner Bros.-Seven Arts album failed to capture the same level of attention and admiration.

In a retrospective review by Richard S. Ginell on AllMusic, he commented that Guaraldi "roams farther afield than ever — playing piano and electric harpsichord, experimenting with sleek string backdrops, dabbling with the guitar." Ginell also called Guaraldi's "amateur Bohemian vocal" attempts at singing Tim Hardin's "Black Sheep Boy" and "Reason to Believe" "rather endearing." Ginell concluded by saying Guaraldi "generally keeps things at a low-key level, which gives this scattershot album at least a veneer of unity."

Guaraldi historian Derrick Bang offered a mediocre review, saying "everybody's allowed to be grotesquely self-indulgent once, but this overproduced album...is well-named even by the most magnanimous standards," and adding that Guaraldi's vocals are "untrained at best, off-key at worst, and ill-advised in both cases." Bang points out that Guaraldi's "traditional acoustic jazz persona" is only represented by "Once I Loved" and "It Was a Very Good Year".

== Track listing ==
All tracks are written by Vince Guaraldi, except where noted.

Side One
No.	Title	Writer(s)	Length
1.	"Nobody Else"		3:15
2.	"Lucifer's Lady"		6:56
3.	"Black Sheep Boy"	Tim Hardin	2:42
4.	"Once I Loved"	Ray Gilbert; Antônio Carlos Jobim; Vinicius de Moraes	8:30

Side Two
No.	Title	Writer(s)	Length
5.	"The Beat Goes On"	Sonny Bono	3:54
6.	"Yesterday"	John Lennon; Paul McCartney	3:36
7.	"Coffee and Doe-Nuts"		7:03
8.	"Reason to Believe"	Hardin	2:57
9.	"It Was a Very Good Year"	Ervin Drake	6:35
Total length:			45:28

== Personnel ==
- Vince Guaraldi – piano, electric harpsichord, guitar, lead vocals ("Black Sheep Boy", "Reason to Believe")
- Eddie Duran, Robert Addison – guitars
- Bob Maize, Jim McCabe – electric bass
- Peter Marshall – bass
- Jerry Granelli, Al Coster – drums
- Gloria Strassner, Jesse Ehrlich – cello

== See also ==
- Vince Guaraldi discography
- List of songs recorded by Vince Guaraldi
- List of cover versions of Vince Guaraldi songs
- Lee Mendelson Film Productions
