= Vince Guaraldi =

American jazz pianist (1928–1976)

- Guaraldi in 1967
- Born: Vincent Anthony Dellaglio; July 17, 1928; San Francisco, California, U.S.
- Died: February 6, 1976 (aged 47); Menlo Park, California, U.S.
- Other names: "Dr. Funk"; "The Italian Leprechaun"
- Education: Lincoln High School; San Francisco State College
- Occupations: Musician; composer; arranger; producer
- Known for: Peanuts animated music scores ("Linus and Lucy", "Christmas Time Is Here", "Skating", "Great Pumpkin Waltz"); "Cast Your Fate to the Wind"
- Spouse: Shirley Moskowitz (m. 1953; div. 1970)
- Children: 2
- Relatives: Muzzy Marcellino (uncle)
- Musical career
- Genres: West Coast jazz; smooth jazz; Latin jazz; bossa nova; soundtrack
- Instruments: Piano; guitar; whistling; vocals
- Years active: 1951–1976
- Labels: Lee Mendelson Film Productions; Fantasy; Concord; Craft; Warner Bros.-Seven Arts; Omnivore; D & D; V.A.G. Publishing; Columbia Masterworks; Kritzerland
- Website: Vince Guaraldi

Vincent Anthony Guaraldi (/ɡəˈrældi/; né Dellaglio, July 17, 1928 – February 6, 1976) was an American jazz pianist who composed music for animated television adaptations of the Peanuts comic strip. His compositions for this series included their signature melody "Linus and Lucy" and the holiday standard "Christmas Time Is Here". The soundtrack to A Charlie Brown Christmas, composed principally by Guaraldi, became the best-selling jazz album of all time. Guaraldi also performed on piano as a member of Cal Tjader's 1950s ensembles and for his own solo career. Guaraldi's 1962 composition "Cast Your Fate to the Wind" became a radio hit and won a Grammy Award in 1963 for Best Original Jazz Composition. He died of a ruptured abdominal aortic aneurysm on February 6, 1976, at age 47, moments after concluding the first half of a nightclub performance in Menlo Park, California.

== Early life and career ==
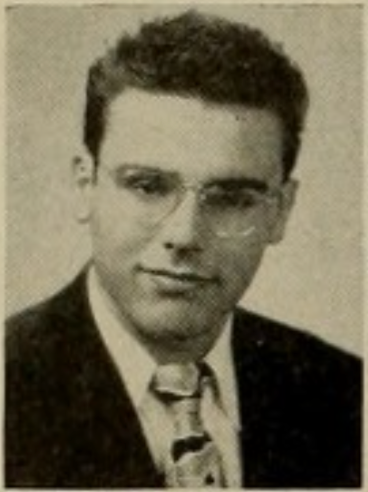
Guaraldi in 1946

Vincent Anthony Dellaglio was born in San Francisco's North Beach neighborhood, an area that later played a central role in his musical development.

After his mother, Carmella Marcellino, divorced his biological father, Vincenzo Dellaglio, she married Anthony "Tony" Guaraldi, who adopted him, and he subsequently took the Guaraldi surname. Following his adoption, Guaraldi spent part of his childhood living upstairs from his mother and stepfather with his grandmother, Jenny Marcellino.

Influenced by his maternal uncles, Joe and whistler Maurice "Muzzy" Marcellino, both active in the San Francisco music scene, he developed an early interest in music and began piano lessons at age seven. He graduated from Lincoln High School, briefly attended San Francisco State College, and served as a cook in the U.S. Army during the Korean War.

=== Early career and first recordings ===
Guaraldi's first recording was an unreleased 1951 demo with Tom Hart.

His first issued recordings followed later that year with Cal Tjader's Mambo Trio, including "Chopsticks Mambo" and "Lullaby of the Leaves", which were later released on The Cal Tjader Trio in 1953. By mid-1954, he had formed his first trio with Eddie Duran (guitar) and Dean Reilly (double bass), performing regularly at the hungry i jazz club in San Francisco, often accompanying vocalist Faith Winthrop.

=== Collaborations and early albums ===
Guaraldi emerged as a bandleader in August 1955 during a live session at the Black Hawk, where he recorded the original compositions "Ginza" and "Calling Dr. Funk". Both were included on Modern Music from San Francisco, released by Fantasy Records in March 1956. Impressed by his work, Fantasy offered him an exclusive contract and soon issued his first album, Vince Guaraldi Trio, with Duran and Reilly.

Concurrently, he toured with Woody Herman's Third Herd, delivering dynamic performances that contrasted with his more subdued recordings. Reuniting with Tjader in 1956, Guaraldi became a key member of two of the vibraphonist's ensembles. The first, focused on straight-ahead jazz, featured Al Torre (drums), Eugene Wright (bass), and Luis Kant (percussion). The second, formed in 1958, incorporated Latin influences and included Al McKibbon (bass), Mongo Santamaría (congas), Willie Bobo (drums), and reed players Paul Horn and José "Chombo" Silva for select performances.

Guaraldi recorded his second album, A Flower Is a Lovesome Thing, in April 1957, again with Duran and Reilly but without a drummer. Released in October 1957, the album struggled commercially, leading Fantasy to drop him.

== Mainstream success ==
Guaraldi (left) with Bernard Bragg and Don Freeman at KQED studios, April 1961.

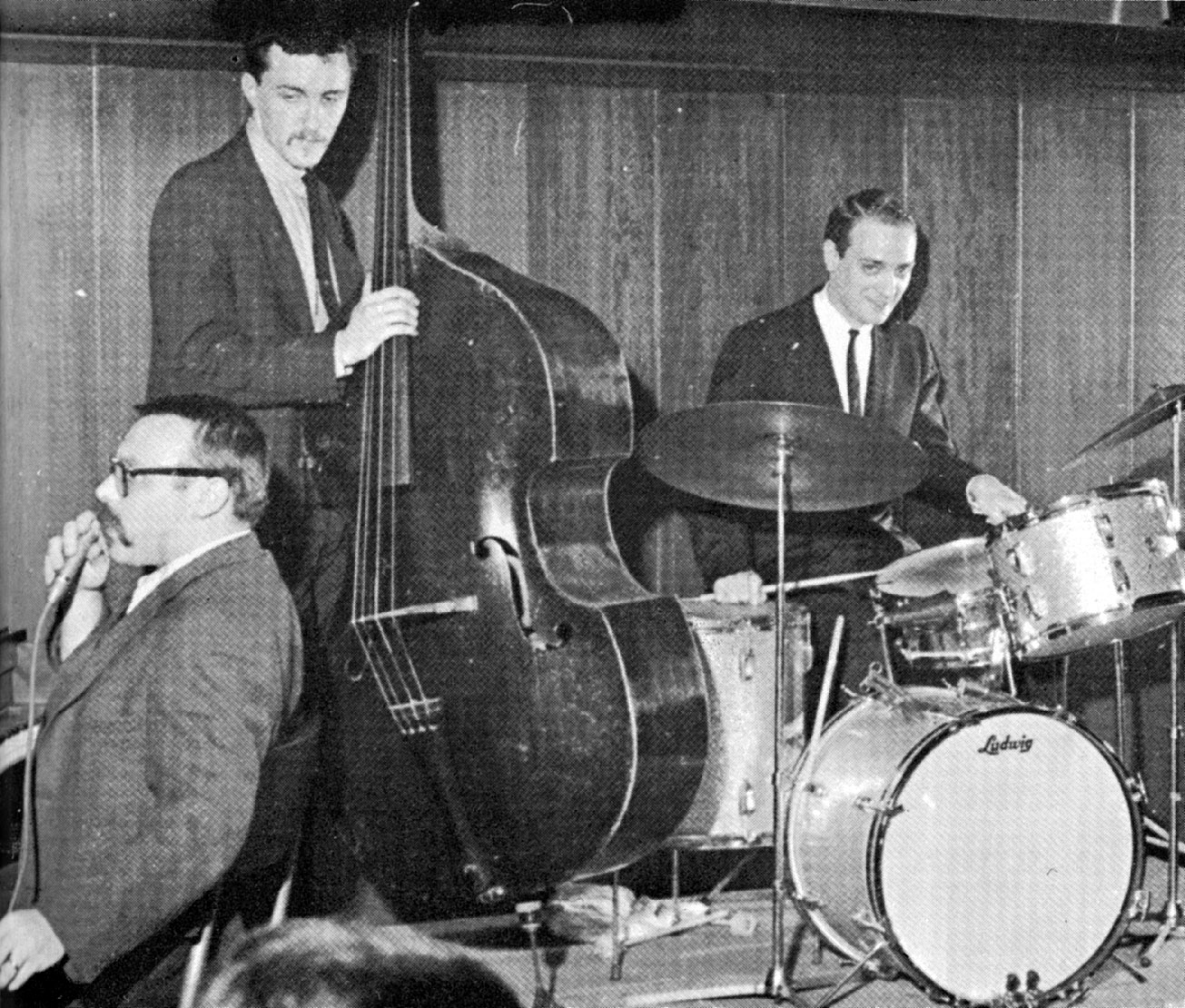
Guaraldi (left), Fred Marshall and Jerry Granelli performing as the Vince Guaraldi Trio in 1963.

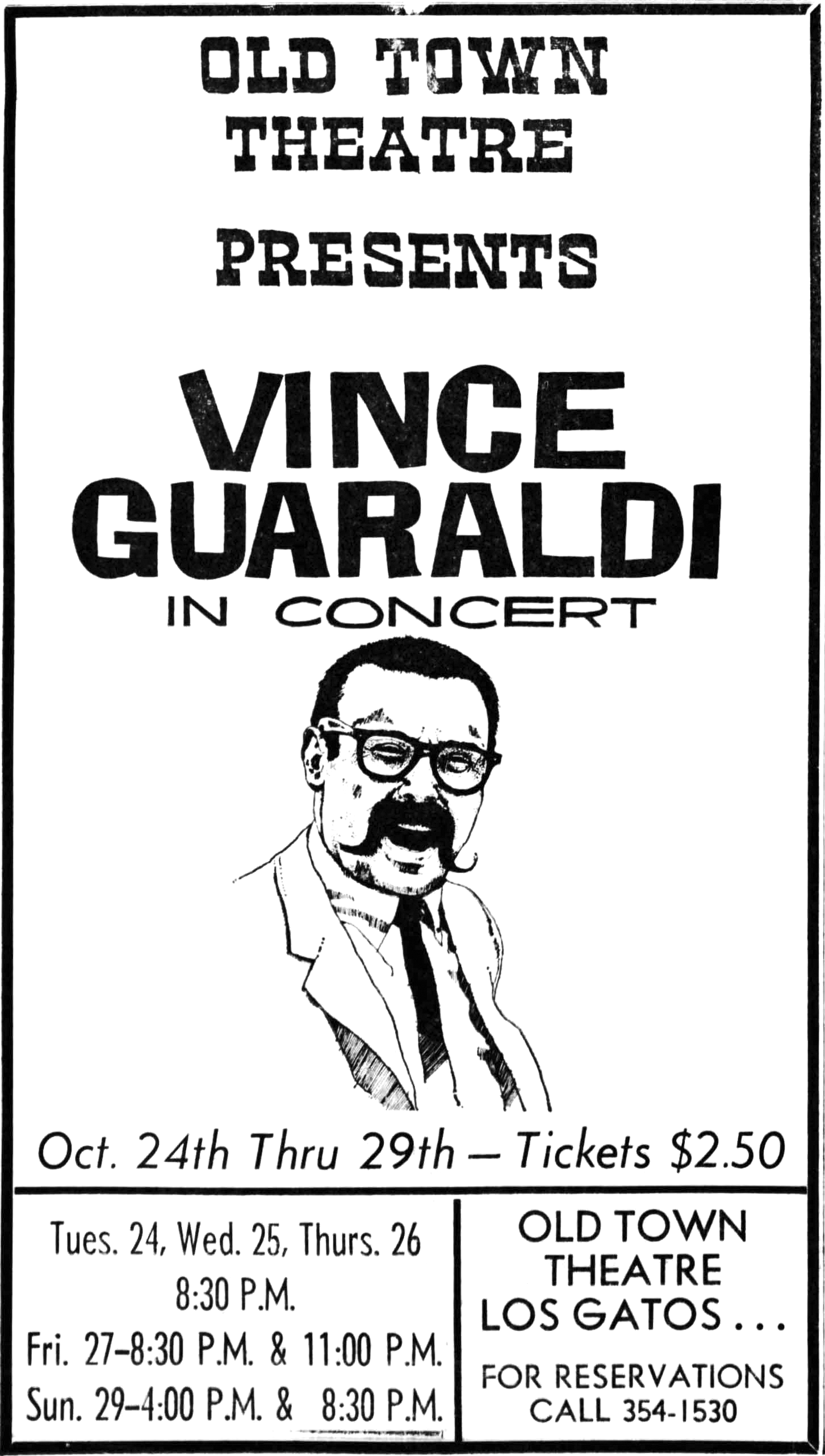
Advertisement for Guaraldi's two-week performance engagement at the Old Town Theater, published in The Spartan Daily, October 24, 1967. Recordings from these performances were released posthumously on An Afternoon with the Vince Guaraldi Quartet (2011).

In early 1959, Guaraldi left his group to focus on solo projects. In April 1961, Guaraldi appeared with illustrator Don Freeman and mime Bernard Bragg on the one-off KQED television special Trio, in which the three artists challenged one another to improvised performances. While he may have remained a respected yet minor jazz figure, his 1962 album Jazz Impressions of Black Orpheus propelled him to prominence. Initially intended to complement covers of Antônio Carlos Jobim and Luiz Bonfá compositions, Guaraldi's original piece, "Cast Your Fate to the Wind", unexpectedly gained traction when radio disc jockeys favored it over its intended A-side, "Samba de Orpheus". The song, a gentle and distinctive jazz instrumental, spent 19 weeks on the Top 100 chart, peaking at No. 22, an uncommon achievement for the genre. Guaraldi subsequently won the Grammy Award for Best Original Jazz Composition.

He embraced its popularity, remarking, "It's like signing the back of a check", and when asked if he had "sold out", he countered, "I feel I bought in". (Note: Guaraldi's response, "I feel I bought in" was reimagined as the slogan "He's not selling out: he's buying in" for the 2011 documentary film POM Wonderful Presents: The Greatest Movie Ever Sold, directed by Morgan Spurlock.)

Capitalizing on this success, Fantasy released In Person, a live album recorded at The Trident in Sausalito, followed by Vince Guaraldi, Bola Sete and Friends, a collaboration with guitarist Bola Sete. This partnership led Guaraldi to explore bossa nova and the electric piano, gaining further attention through an appearance on Ralph J. Gleason's Jazz Casual and the subsequent release of From All Sides (1965). A live performance at El Matador in 1965 was later issued as Live at El Matador (1966).

In 1964, Guaraldi experimented with Latin jazz and orchestral arrangements in The Latin Side of Vince Guaraldi, enlisting arranger Jack Weeks.

- Stern Grove Festival 1966
- Vince Guaraldi Group

Around this time, Guaraldi was commissioned to compose a jazz-infused mass for San Francisco's Grace Cathedral. Incorporating Latin influences and waltz tempos, the performance was recorded on May 21, 1965, and released as At Grace Cathedral.

By 1965, tensions with Fantasy Records escalated when Guaraldi discovered he was receiving only 5% of record sales, a rate he later described as "parsimonious" and sometimes even lower. He initiated legal action to sever ties with Fantasy, prompting a countersuit. In 1967, after Fantasy was acquired by Saul Zaentz, both parties dropped their lawsuits, allowing Guaraldi to become an independent artist. Following the settlement, Guaraldi secured improved financial terms, including 50% of the re-broadcast and publishing royalties for compositions recorded prior to the agreement, and 75% for new works composed thereafter. (In 2011, his children sued Fantasy's parent company, Concord Music, alleging financial misrepresentation and unpaid royalties exceeding $2 million between 2005 and 2010.)

During this transitional period, Guaraldi launched his own label, D & D Records, named after his children, David and Dia. In December 1967, he released his sole album under the imprint, Vince Guaraldi with the San Francisco Boys Chorus.

== Compositions for Charles Schulz's Peanuts ==
Guaraldi composed music scores for the first fifteen Peanuts television specials plus one feature film, and was responsible for their signature theme, "Linus and Lucy".

=== A Boy Named Charlie Brown and A Charlie Brown Christmas ===
Guaraldi's association with the Peanuts franchise began in 1963 when television producer Lee Mendelson, searching for music for a planned documentary on Charles M. Schulz titled A Boy Named Charlie Brown, heard "Cast Your Fate to the Wind" on the radio. Recognizing its potential, Mendelson sought out Guaraldi, who enthusiastically accepted the offer to compose the documentary's score. Soon after, Guaraldi played an untitled composition over the phone for Mendelson, unable to contain his excitement. That piece, later named "Linus and Lucy", became the defining musical theme of the Peanuts franchise.

Although the documentary was never aired due to Mendelson's inability to secure sponsorship, the music was recorded and released in 1964 as Jazz Impressions of A Boy Named Charlie Brown. Encouraged by Guaraldi's work, Mendelson and Schulz retained him for the upcoming Peanuts holiday special, A Charlie Brown Christmas (1965). The soundtrack, recorded with the Vince Guaraldi Trio, featured enduring compositions such as "Christmas Time Is Here", "Skating", "Christmas Is Coming", and "Linus and Lucy". The success of the special and its soundtrack established Guaraldi as an integral part of the Peanuts identity; in August 2026, the album was certified sextuple platinum and became the best-selling jazz album of all time.

Guaraldi historian Derrick Bang underscored how Guaraldi's music became inseparable from the identity of Peanuts, describing his scores as the defining sound of the franchise and praising the consistent vitality of the compositions. Mendelson likewise regarded Guaraldi's jazz writing as indispensable to A Charlie Brown Christmas, later asserting that without that score, the Peanuts franchise would not have developed as it did. Despite Guaraldi's limited experience in dramatic scoring and Mendelson's background in documentary filmmaking, their shared feeling for jazz informed a careful, iterative process of shaping cues across fifteen specials. Although some material was reused or left out, Guaraldi's music remained central to the finished productions.

=== It's the Great Pumpkin, Charlie Brown ===
Following the unexpected success of A Charlie Brown Christmas, the creative team produced another special, Charlie Brown's All Stars! (1966), which was also well received. With confidence in their ability to replicate their initial success, Schulz, Mendelson, and animator Bill Melendez set their sights on another holiday-themed special, It's the Great Pumpkin, Charlie Brown (1966).

Guaraldi composed the score on October 4, 1966, advocating for "Linus and Lucy" to become the franchise's unofficial theme. Recognizing this oversight in Charlie Brown's All Stars!, he ensured that the piece was featured prominently in Great Pumpkin. Melendez responded by structuring the special's opening sequence around a dialogue-free montage, accompanied solely by Guaraldi's music. This version of "Linus and Lucy", recorded with a sextet that included bassist Monty Budwig, drummer Colin Bailey, trumpeter Emmanuel Klein, guitarist John Gray, and flautist Ronnie Lang, helped further solidify the song's place as the Peanuts musical identity. The score also introduced other compositions associated with the special, including "Great Pumpkin Waltz" and "Red Baron".

Guaraldi continued composing for Peanuts, scoring twelve additional animated television specials, as well as the feature film A Boy Named Charlie Brown and the documentary Charlie Brown and Charles Schulz (both 1969).

== Later years and artistic evolution ==
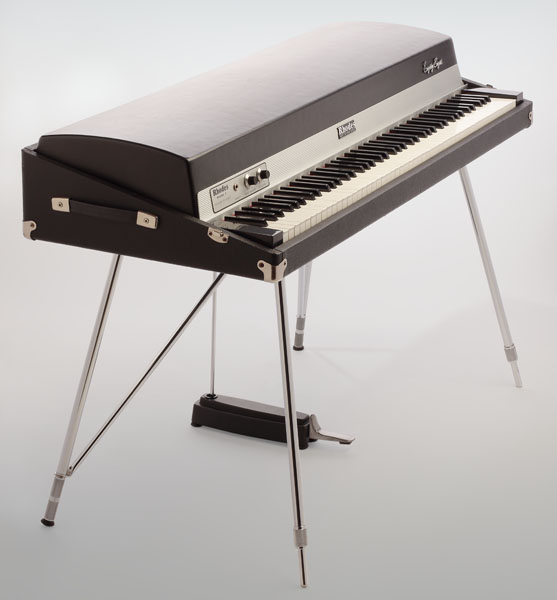
Guaraldi made extensive use of the Fender Rhodes electric piano on most 1970s-era Peanuts music scores.

Guaraldi (seated) with bassist Seward McCain at Santa Clara University, January 5, 1974.

After a prolonged struggle to free himself from Fantasy Records, Guaraldi signed with Warner Bros.-Seven Arts in 1968. His first release under the new label, Oh Good Grief!, featured reimagined renditions of eight of his most popular Peanuts compositions. His subsequent 1969 albums, The Eclectic Vince Guaraldi and Alma-Ville, marked a departure from his earlier work, incorporating jazz fusion, electric keyboards, and more avant-garde styles. However, these experimental efforts received mixed critical and commercial reception, leading Warner Bros.-Seven Arts to decline a contract renewal.

Following his work on the Peanuts feature film A Boy Named Charlie Brown and the release of Alma-Ville, Guaraldi was unable to secure a new recording contract. Although he recorded several hours of studio material during this period, much of which was issued posthumously in the 2000s, disputes with record label executives and a broader estrangement from the recording industry left him without sustained institutional support. With fewer opportunities to record commercially, he stopped releasing new albums and shifted his focus toward live performance and television scoring.

Scores such as A Charlie Brown Thanksgiving (1973), which introduced "Little Birdie" and the recurring "Thanksgiving Theme", It's a Mystery, Charlie Brown (1974) and You're a Good Sport, Charlie Brown (1975) reflected contemporary popular styles like funk and disco, and by late 1974 he had expanded his palette further with the clavinet, harpsichord and ARP String Ensemble synthesizer. As rock 'n' roll surged in the 1960s, leading to the decline of jazz clubs and job losses for many jazz musicians, Guaraldi adapted by incorporating electric keyboards into his style rather than resisting the changing musical landscape. His later work blended jazz, rock, and funk, frequently featuring the Hammond B-3 and Fender Rhodes electric keyboards. Financially secure from Peanuts royalties, Guaraldi chose to remain in Mill Valley, California, performing at local clubs rather than seeking broader fame. Even as jazz venues declined in the rock era, he remained a provincial and respected figure in the Northern California scene.

== Death and impact ==
Guaraldi (seated) with bassist Seward McCain at Butterfield's Nightclub in September 1975. McCain was present at the club when Guaraldi died suddenly between sets in February 1976.

Guaraldi had been in poor health in the period leading up to his death. A heavy cigarette smoker, he had sought medical attention for persistent stomach problems and chest discomfort that was thought to resemble indigestion. A doctor reportedly suspected a diaphragmatic hernia, but Guaraldi was prescribed medication for ulcers and dismissed without further examination. The night before his death, while dining at Lee Mendelson's home, he again complained of discomfort.

On the morning of February 6, 1976, Guaraldi awoke feeling unwell and remained in bed. That afternoon, he nevertheless completed recording sessions for It's Arbor Day, Charlie Brown at Wally Heider Studios in San Francisco with bassist Seward McCain and drummer Jim Zimmerman. Zimmerman later recalled that although Guaraldi had recently seemed active and energetic, he began complaining again of stomach pain once back in the studio.

That evening, Guaraldi performed the first set at Butterfield's Nightclub in Menlo Park, closing with his interpretation of the Beatles' "Eleanor Rigby". He then returned to his room at the adjacent Red Cottage Inn to rest before the next set. While there, he collapsed while attempting to go to the bathroom. Efforts to revive him were unsuccessful, and he was pronounced dead on arrival at Stanford Hospital at 11:07 p.m. His death was initially reported as a heart attack, though later accounts identified the cause as a ruptured abdominal aortic aneurysm. In a later interview, McCain said the coroner told those present that Guaraldi could not have been saved even if doctors had been immediately available, and he remembered the shock of the loss lingering for years. Zimmerman later reflected, "It is very romantic to think of someone going out just after they play. I wish he hadn't."

Guaraldi's death deeply affected those who knew him. Mendelson later described the loss as "totally unexpected" and recalled the emotional impact of hearing Peanuts music played at the funeral at the request of Guaraldi's mother, Carmella, calling it one of the saddest days of his life. Jason Mendelson later said that his father rarely spoke about Guaraldi's death and believed he never fully recovered from the loss. Bill Melendez simply stated, "He was a real good guy, and we miss him".

Drummer Mike Clark remembered being stunned by the news, saying that Guaraldi had always seemed full of energy and possibility. Rev. Charles Gompertz, who invited Guaraldi to perform at Grace Cathedral in 1965, reflected that Guaraldi often neglected his health and pushed himself to extremes, both musically and physically. His mother later remarked that he passed the way he would have wanted, "with the piano".

Guaraldi's funeral was held at Our Lady of Mercy Catholic Church in Daly City, California, and he was buried at Holy Cross Cemetery in Colma.

== Personal life ==
Guaraldi married his high school sweetheart, Shirley Moskowitz, on February 1, 1953. They had two children, David Anthony Guaraldi (August 11, 1955 – September 24, 2026) and Dia Lisa (born February 16, 1960). Moskowitz initially filed for divorce in 1966, but later withdrew the petition; a second filing was finalized in December 1970. Guaraldi later maintained a long-term relationship with Gretchen Glanzer (later Katamay), who appeared on the cover of The Latin Side of Vince Guaraldi and was photographed with him among friends of the Grateful Dead on the rear cover of Aoxomoxoa (1969).

Guaraldi was a practicing Catholic.

== Revival, rediscovery, and posthumous releases ==
During Guaraldi's lifetime, only three albums devoted to Peanuts music were released: Jazz Impressions of A Boy Named Charlie Brown, A Charlie Brown Christmas, and Oh Good Grief!, the last consisting of re-recorded versions of earlier themes. Subsequent soundtrack releases were hindered by uncertainty over the survival and condition of the original session tapes. Although A Charlie Brown Christmas was recorded in stereo for album release, most of the 1960s Peanuts specials were produced in monaural sound, further complicating later soundtrack issues.

Interest in Guaraldi's catalog revived in the mid-1980s through tribute recordings and the continuing popularity of A Charlie Brown Christmas. Notable projects included David Benoit's 1985 recording of "Linus and Lucy" on This Side Up, Happy Anniversary, Charlie Brown! (1989), Wynton Marsalis's Joe Cool's Blues (1995), holiday recordings by Cyrus Chestnut, and George Winston's Linus and Lucy: The Music of Vince Guaraldi (1996), followed by Love Will Come: The Music of Vince Guaraldi, Volume 2 (2010). A planned third volume, Count the Ways: The Music of Vince Guaraldi, Volume 3, remained unreleased following Winston's death in June 2023.

In October 2022, Benoit and the Santa Rosa Symphony gave the world premiere of an orchestral version of "Woodstock Medley". Benoit had recorded the suite in 2021, combining Guaraldi themes from A Charlie Brown Thanksgiving, You're Not Elected, Charlie Brown, and It's the Easter Beagle, Charlie Brown. The performance was presented as part of Playing for Peanuts: The Music of Vince Guaraldi at the Luther Burbank Center for the Arts in Santa Rosa.

By 1996, A Charlie Brown Christmas had reached double-platinum status, and its sales continued to grow after Concord Records acquired Fantasy Records in 2004. Guaraldi's son David also licensed recordings from his father's personal reel-to-reel tapes for archival albums including The Charlie Brown Suite & Other Favorites (2003), Oaxaca (2004), North Beach (2006), Live on the Air (2008), and An Afternoon with the Vince Guaraldi Quartet (2011).

Another archival breakthrough came in 2017 with the rediscovery of the original masters for the 1969 feature film A Boy Named Charlie Brown. In 2018, Craft Recordings issued a soundtrack album for It's the Great Pumpkin, Charlie Brown using audio taken from the television soundtrack. The original 1966 session recordings were subsequently recovered during the COVID-19 lockdown, allowing a more complete edition to be released in 2022.

Jason and Sean Mendelson subsequently began a wider series of remastered Peanuts soundtrack releases through Lee Mendelson Film Productions (LMFP). Releases included A Charlie Brown Thanksgiving (2023), It Was a Short Summer, Charlie Brown and You're Not Elected, Charlie Brown (2024), and Be My Valentine, Charlie Brown, It's the Easter Beagle, Charlie Brown, and You're a Good Sport, Charlie Brown (2025). The Peanuts Collection, Vol. 1 followed at the end of 2025. The scores for It's Arbor Day, Charlie Brown and Charlie Brown's All Stars! were released together in March 2026. The series continued with It's a Mystery, Charlie Brown in September 2026.

Separate from the Peanuts soundtrack series, Craft began issuing expanded editions of Guaraldi's broader catalog in 2022, including Jazz Impressions of Black Orpheus and a five-disc edition of A Charlie Brown Christmas. An expanded edition of Jazz Impressions of A Boy Named Charlie Brown followed in 2025, and From All Sides was remastered for the Original Jazz Classics series in 2026.

These releases brought greater attention to Guaraldi's extensive but incompletely documented body of work. Gaps in its preservation and promotion have been attributed to his lack of a recording contract during his later career and the fragmentation of his catalog after his death. His Peanuts music also faced skepticism in some jazz circles, where it was dismissed as overly commercial or merely children's music.

== Legacy ==
Guaraldi's legacy rests on the enduring popularity of his Peanuts scores and the broader revival of his catalog through archival reissues. His music helped define the sound of Charles M. Schulz's characters and remains among the most recognizable bodies of work in television music. In August 2026, A Charlie Brown Christmas was certified sextuple platinum for six million units in the United States, surpassing Miles Davis's Kind of Blue to become the best-selling jazz album of all time. Lee Mendelson later said that several generations had grown up with Guaraldi's music and that even a few opening notes of "Linus and Lucy" could prompt an immediate positive audience response. "The Peanuts programs and Vince's music were such a wonderful marriage," Mendelson said. "It's a shame it got cut off so soon." A book-length biography, Vince Guaraldi at the Piano by Derrick Bang, was first published in 2012 and expanded in a second edition in 2024.

Writing in the original liner notes for Jazz Impressions of A Boy Named Charlie Brown, Ralph J. Gleason argued that Guaraldi had managed the difficult task of translating Schulz's artistic sensibility into music while preserving his own distinctive voice. In a later review, All About Jazz critic David Rickert similarly credited Guaraldi with introducing many listeners to jazz through the Peanuts soundtracks and praised both the sophistication and accessibility of his writing.

=== Copyright enforcement and Stephen Colbert licensing dispute ===
In May 2026, LMFP filed four copyright infringement lawsuits involving unauthorized uses of music associated with the Peanuts franchise, including compositions by Guaraldi. The defendants included the United States Department of Health and Human Services, video game publisher GameMill Entertainment, Heritage Auctions, and Buckle-Down, Inc. The lawsuits drew national and international media coverage and highlighted the continuing commercial value of Guaraldi's music more than fifty years after his death.

Later that month, Guaraldi's "Linus and Lucy" received renewed media attention when it was used without prior authorization in a comedic segment during the final episode of The Late Show with Stephen Colbert. The broadcast led to a licensing agreement between CBS and LMFP; proceeds from the agreement were donated by LMFP to World Central Kitchen. CBS had originally broadcast most Peanuts specials produced by LMFP between 1965 and 2000.

=== Documentary ===
The 2010 documentary The Anatomy of Vince Guaraldi screened at a number of jazz and film festivals and presented restored performance and recording footage alongside commentary from musicians, critics, and surviving collaborators. Among those featured were George Winston, Dave Brubeck, Dick Gregory, Jon Hendricks, Leonard Maltin, Paul Krassner, Eddie Duran, Dean Reilly, and Jerry Granelli. Co-produced by Toby Gleason and filmmaker Andrew Thomas, the film won five documentary awards and was screened at both the Library of Congress and the Monterey Jazz Festival.

== Sidemen and trio configurations ==
Throughout his career, Guaraldi collaborated with a diverse array of sidemen, though he primarily favored performing in a trio. The ensemble occasionally expanded to accommodate specific musical demands, including live performances and Peanuts soundtracks. His largest recorded ensemble appeared in 1969 for the soundtracks of It Was a Short Summer... (dectet) and A Boy Named Charlie Brown (septet).

For bass and double bass, Guaraldi regularly worked with Monty Budwig, Dean Reilly, Fred Marshall, and Tom Beeson throughout the 1950s and 1960s. In the 1970s, he primarily performed with Seward McCain, alongside occasional collaborations with Koji Kataoka.

Guitarist Eddie Duran was a frequent collaborator during the 1950s and 1960s, except between 1963 and 1965, when Guaraldi partnered with guitarist Bola Sete in a dual act. In the 1970s, Guaraldi occasionally played guitar himself but did not maintain a dedicated guitarist.

Guaraldi's first two albums were recorded without a drummer. From 1961 onward, Colin Bailey assumed the role, followed by Jerry Granelli. During the 1970s, Mike Clark became Guaraldi's primary drummer for live performances. Other drummers included Lee Charlton, John Rae, Al Coster, Eliot Zigmund, Glenn Cronkhite, Vince Lateano, Mark Rosengarden, and Jim Zimmerman.

The original Vince Guaraldi Trio featured Dean Reilly (bass) and Eddie Duran (guitar) and appeared on his first two albums. The first of two "classic" trio configurations included Monty Budwig (bass) and Colin Bailey (drums), performing on Jazz Impressions of Black Orpheus and Jazz Impressions of A Boy Named Charlie Brown. The second "classic" trio, featuring Fred Marshall (double bass) and Jerry Granelli (drums), recorded more albums than any other iteration, including Vince Guaraldi, Bola Sete and Friends, Jazz Casual: Paul Winter/Bola Sete and Vince Guaraldi, The Latin Side of Vince Guaraldi, From All Sides, and A Charlie Brown Christmas.

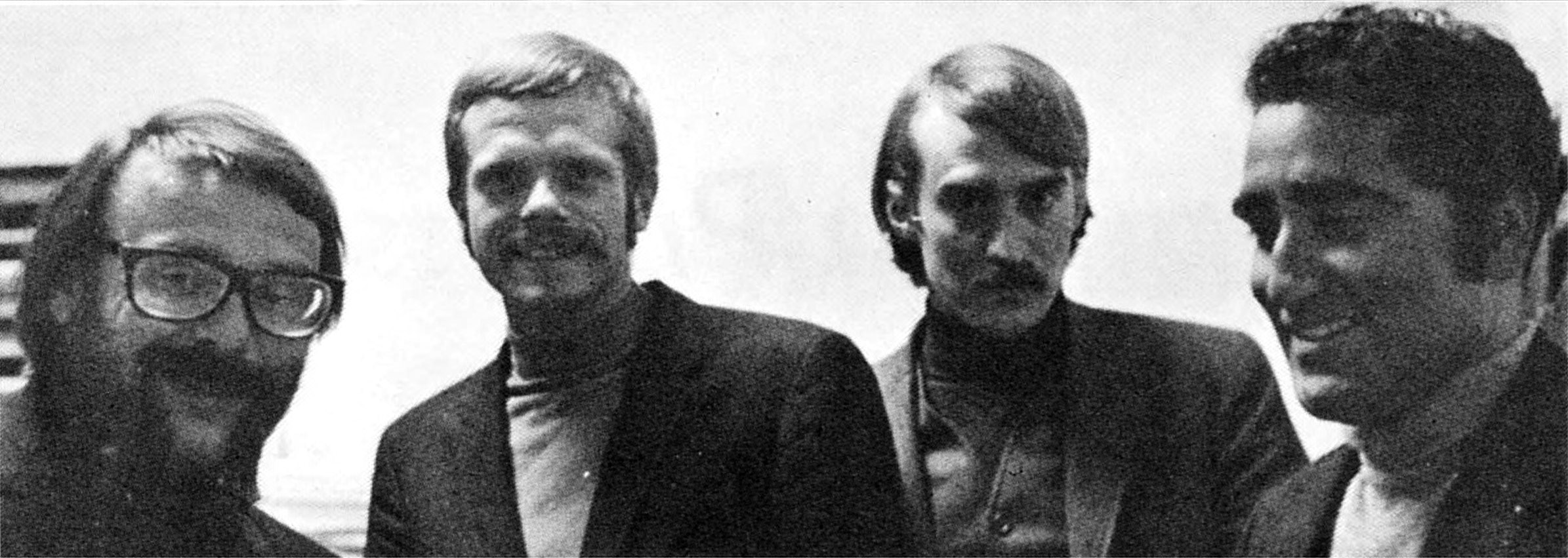
Vince Guaraldi Quartet in May 1968. From left to right: Guaraldi, Bob Maize (double bass), Fritz Kasten (drums), and Eddie Duran (guitar).

== Discography ==
=== Studio albums ===
- Modern Music from San Francisco (1956)
- Vince Guaraldi Trio (1956)
- A Flower Is a Lovesome Thing (1957)
- Jazz Impressions of Black Orpheus (1962)
- Vince Guaraldi, Bola Sete and Friends (1964)
- The Latin Side of Vince Guaraldi (1964)
- From All Sides (1965)
- Vince Guaraldi with the San Francisco Boys Chorus (1967)
- Oh Good Grief! (1968)
- The Eclectic Vince Guaraldi (1969)
- Alma-Ville (1969)

=== Peanuts scores ===
- Jazz Impressions of A Boy Named Charlie Brown (1964)
- A Charlie Brown Christmas (1965)
- Charlie Brown's All Stars! (1966)
- It's the Great Pumpkin, Charlie Brown (1966)
- You're in Love, Charlie Brown (1967)
- He's Your Dog, Charlie Brown (1968)
- Charlie Brown and Charles Schulz (1969)
- It Was a Short Summer, Charlie Brown (1969)
- A Boy Named Charlie Brown (1970)
- Play It Again, Charlie Brown (1971)
- You're Not Elected, Charlie Brown (1972)
- There's No Time for Love, Charlie Brown (1973)
- A Charlie Brown Thanksgiving (1973)
- It's a Mystery, Charlie Brown (1974)
- It's the Easter Beagle, Charlie Brown (1974)
- Be My Valentine, Charlie Brown (1975)
- You're a Good Sport, Charlie Brown (1975)
- It's Arbor Day, Charlie Brown (1976)

== Sources ==
- Bang, Derrick (2024). Vince Guaraldi at the Piano (2nd ed.). McFarland. ISBN 978-1-4766-5223-8.
- "Vince Guaraldi Albums". Lee Mendelson Film Productions.
- Bang, Derrick. "Jazz Impressions of Vince Guaraldi". FiveCentsPlease.org. Derrick Bang and Scott McGuire.
