= Mannie Klein =

American jazz trumpeter (1908–1994)

- Born: Emmanuel Klein; February 4, 1908; New York City, New York, U.S.
- Died: May 31, 1994 (aged 86) Los Angeles, California, U.S.
- Genres: Jazz, swing
- Occupation: Musician
- Instrument: Trumpet

Emmanuel Klein (February 4, 1908 – May 31, 1994) was an American jazz trumpeter most associated with swing.

== Career ==
Born in New York City, New York, Emmanuel's parents, Jacob and Gussie Klein, were Yiddish-speaking immigrants from the Polish area (Galicia) of the Austrian Empire. Emmanuel (Mannie) left high school after two years to join his older brothers Solomon and David as theater musician. He began recording with The Ambassadors for Vocalion in 1924, worked with Paul Whiteman in 1928 and was active throughout the 1930s as a studio musician and playing with Jimmy Dorsey, Tommy Dorsey, Glenn Miller, Benny Goodman, the Boswell Sisters and others. In 1937, he moved to California and worked with Frank Trumbauer's orchestra. In 1939 he declined an offer from Fritz Reiner to join the Pittsburgh Symphony. In early 1940 he appeared on Artie Shaw recordings. He worked on soundtracks and played trumpet for the film From Here to Eternity (1953) but was uncredited. He worked with musicians associated with West Coast jazz in the 1950s. Klein voiced-over Ziggy Elman's trumpet parts on the soundtrack of the movie The Gene Krupa Story.

Klein studied with Max Schlossberg of the New York Philharmonic. He held a non-first trumpet position in the NBC Symphony Orchestra under Arturo Toscanini. In 1953, he appeared on the Capitol Records album Concerto In C Minor For Piano by Dmitri Shostakovich and The Four Temperaments by Paul Hindemith with Victor Aller and Felix Slatkin.

During the early 1960s, Mannie Klein appeared on several Dean Martin recordings. He played piccolo trumpet on Hugo Montenegro's hit version of the main theme to the film The Good, the Bad and the Ugly (1966).

In the 1970's, Klein toured and recorded as a freelance jazz musician, notably in Holland with the Ted Easton Jazzband and American trombone veteran Spiegle Willcox and tenorist Bert Noah.

Mannie married Marion Lichtenstein (1917-1997), with whom he had two sons, Jack David Klein (1943-2000) and William Lee Klein, born 1945.

== Death ==
Mannie Klein died at the age of 86 in Los Angeles, California, on May 31, 1994.

== Legacy ==
The mute company Humes & Berg introduced the "Sh! Sh! Mannie Klein" line of trumpet practice mutes in Klein's honor.

== Partial discography ==
=== As leader ===
- The Sound of Music (Imperial, 1959) - the Mannie Klein Sextet

With Sammy Davis Jr

- It's All Over but the Swingin' (Decca, 1957)

With Junior Mance

- Get Ready, Set, Jump!!! (Capitol, 1964)

With Pete Rugolo

- Ten Trumpets and 2 Guitars (Mercury, 1961)

With the Vince Guaraldi Sextet

- It's the Great Pumpkin, Charlie Brown: Music from the Soundtrack (Concord, 1966)

== Partial filmography ==
- From Here to Eternity (1953) - Trumpet Player (uncredited)
- A Symposium on Popular Songs (1962, Short) - Musician-Trumpet (final film role)
