= Colin Bailey (drummer) =

British-American jazz drummer (1934–2021)

Background information
- Born: Colin James Bailey; 9 July 1934; Swindon, England
- Died: 20 September 2021 (aged 87) Port Hueneme, California, United States
- Genres: Jazz, pop
- Occupation: Musician
- Instrument: Drums
- Years active: 1941–1998
- Labels: Concord Jazz, Fantasy, Milestone
- Formerly of: Vince Guaraldi, Dizzy Gillespie, Sarah Vaughan, Monty Budwig, Joe Pass, Chet Baker, Ray Brown, João Gilberto, Blossom Dearie, Benny Goodman, Ed Shaughnessy

Colin James Bailey (9 July 1934 – 20 September 2021) was a British-born American jazz drummer.

== Biography ==
Born in Swindon, England, in 1934, Bailey learned to play drums as a child, studying formally from age seven. His first band was the Nibs, when he was 7, which consisted of two accordions, banjo and drums. He toured with Winifred Atwell from 1952–1956, and performed at the London Palladium for Queen Elizabeth (1952). He lived in Australia from 1958 into the early 1960s, playing in the staff band for Channel 9 TV. In Sydney, he played with Bryce Rohde and the Australian Jazz Quartet, backing musicians such as Dizzy Gillespie and Sarah Vaughan. When the AJQ toured the U.S., Bailey was hired by Vince Guaraldi, with Monty Budwig on bass. This trio played with Jimmy Witherspoon, Ben Webster, and Gene Ammons for the Jazz Workshop in San Francisco. In 1962, they recorded the album Jazz Impressions of Black Orpheus, which included the hit "Cast Your Fate To The Wind". In 1963, he moved to Los Angeles to play with the Victor Feldman Trio, returning to San Francisco the following year to record Jazz Impressions of A Boy Named Charlie Brown with Guaraldi. Bailey also performed with Guaraldi on the Peanuts television specials A Charlie Brown Christmas (1965), It's the Great Pumpkin, Charlie Brown (1966) and He's Your Dog, Charlie Brown (1968).

Bailey worked with Clare Fischer (1963–1964), Joe Pass (for 14 years, and made 14 records) and Miles Davis (1963). He toured worldwide with Benny Goodman in 1964–1965, played on the first Regis Philbin show with Terry Gibbs, and toured with George Shearing (1964-1967). In 1967 he recorded with Frank Sinatra and Tom Jobim. He also spent time with Chet Baker, Ray Brown, João Gilberto, and Blossom Dearie (1975).

In 1970, Bailey became an American citizen. He spent six years as Ed Shaughnessy's backup in The Tonight Show Band, and starred in Fernwood Tonight in a drumming/comedy role in 1977–78. After moving to Texas in 1979, he became a faculty member at North Texas State University from 1981–83. His later work includes time with Richie Cole, Jimmy Rowles, Red Mitchell, Stefan Scaggiari, Joe Pass, Ron Affif, Weslia Whitfield, and John Pisano. His last tour was with Joe Williams in 1998.

Bailey died at his home in Port Hueneme, California, on 20 September 2021, at the age of 87. He had been suffering from pneumonia and post COVID-19 complications.

== Discography ==
With Clare Fischer

- Surging Ahead (Pacific Jazz, 1963)
- Extension (Pacific Jazz, 1963)
- Só Danço Samba (World Pacific, 1964)

With Vince Guaraldi

- Jazz Impressions of Black Orpheus (Fantasy, 1962)
- In Person (Fantasy, 1963)
- Jazz Impressions of A Boy Named Charlie Brown (Fantasy, 1964)
- A Charlie Brown Christmas (Fantasy, 1965)
- It's the Great Pumpkin, Charlie Brown: Original Soundtrack Recording (Craft Recordings, 2018/2022 [recorded 1966])
- He's Your Dog, Charlie Brown (1968) (no soundtrack release)
- Alma-Ville (Warner Bros.-Seven Arts, 1970)

With Paul Horn

- Impressions of Cleopatra (Columbia, 1963)

With Julie London

- All Through the Night: Julie London Sings the Choicest of Cole Porter (Liberty, 1965)

With Joe Pass

- Catch Me! (Pacific Jazz, 1963)
- Joy Spring (Pacific Jazz, 1964)
- For Django (Pacific Jazz, 1964)
- Simplicity (Pacific Jazz, 1967)
- Summer Nights (Pablo, 1989)
- Appassionato (Pablo, 1991)
- Six-String Santa (Laserlight, 1992)
- Live at Yoshi's (Pablo, 1992)
- My Song (Telarc, 1993)
- Roy Clark & Joe Pass Play Hank Williams (Pablo, 1994) with Roy Clark
- Nuages (Live at Yoshi's, vol. 2) (Pablo, 1997)

With Frank Potenza

- For Joe (Capri Records, 2013)

With Frank Sinatra and Tom Jobim

- Francis Albert Sinatra & Antônio Carlos Jobim (Reprise, 1967)
