= Craft Recordings =

American record label

- Parent company: Concord (2017-2026); BMG Rights Management (2026-present)
- Founded: April 24, 2017
- Status: Reissue label
- Distributor: Universal Music Group
- Genre: Various
- Country of origin: United States
- Location: Los Angeles, California
- Official website: craftrecordings.com

Craft Recordings is a record label owned by BMG Rights Management. It was originally founded in 2017 by Concord, specializing in reissues of Concord's back catalog, similar to other music companies's reissue labels UMe, Legacy Recordings, and Rhino Entertainment. The imprint was founded in 2017, along with an online store by the same name offering a curated selection of deluxe CD and vinyl boxed sets, stand-alone LPs, and legacy label and artist merchandise. Its first release was a deluxe vinyl edition of Thelonious Monk and John Coltrane’s Complete 1957 Recordings. Sig Sigworth is the president of Craft Recordings.

Craft is home to numerous legacy labels including Atlantic, Contemporary, EMI, Fania, Fantasy, HighTone, Independiente, Interscope, Milestone, Musart, Notro, Pablo, Panart Records, Prestige Records, Reprise, Riverside, Slash, SLG, Specialty Records, Stax, Sugar Hill, Takoma, Telarc, Vanguard, Varèse Sarabande, Vee-Jay, Victory, Warner Bros. and Wind-Up. Craft is also the releasing arm for catalog titles from Concord's frontline labels, including Concord Records, Fearless Records and Rounder Records.

Craft has reissued albums by Wes Montgomery, Creedence Clearwater Revival, Vince Guaraldi, John Lee Hooker, Little Richard, John Coltrane, R.E.M., Evanescence, The Offspring, Nine Inch Nails, Alice in Chains, Violent Femmes, Jewel, Creed, Bush, Genesis, Phil Collins, and others. It has not only reissued material from catalog Concord artists, but also released rare material from them.

On June 26, 2019, Craft digitally reissued many albums of the legendary Stax soul label. Craft has also reissued, on vinyl, Stax's two-LP compilation from 1969, Soul Explosion, which compiled the label's biggest hits of that time onto the first disc, coupled with rare, hard-to-find tracks on the second. In August 2019, the Craft Latino imprint announced that it would re-release several Fania Records albums by Celia Cruz, Tito Puente, Johnny Pacheco, and Willie Colón.

On September 1, 2026, Concord merged with BMG Rights Management, bringing Craft and its catalog into BMG's roster.
