= Satellite Award for Outstanding Youth Blu-Ray/DVD =

Retired annual media award

The Satellite Award for Outstanding Youth Blu-Ray/DVD is an annual award given by the International Press Academy as one of its Satellite Awards.

== Winners and nominees ==
=== Outstanding Youth DVD ===
Year	Winners and nominees
2002	Monsters, Inc.
2002	Beauty and the Beast
2002	Ice Age
2002	Jimmy Neutron: Boy Genius
2002	Singin' in the Rain
2003	The Lion King (For the Platinum Edition.)
2003	Barbie of Swan Lake
2003	Finding Nemo
2003	It's a Very Merry Muppet Christmas Movie
2003	Itty Bitty Heartbeats
2003	Hooves of Fire, and Legend of the Lost Tribe (Robbie the Reindeer - Hooves of Fire/Legend of the Lost Tribe (US Versions))
2004	The Iron Giant
2004	Aladdin (For the Special Platinum Edition (2004).)
2004	The Big Snooze, Beep, Beep, Bad Ol' Putty Tat, and Back Alley Oproar (For Looney Tunes - Golden Collection, Volume Two.)
2004	Elf
2004	Ella Enchanted
2004	Meet Me in St. Louis
2004	Mulan (For the special edition.)
2004	Rocky and His Friends (For the Complete Second Season.)
2004	Seven Brides for Seven Brothers (For the 2004 Warner Bros. edition.)
2004	SpongeBob SquarePants (For the complete 2nd season.)
2004	Terrahawks
2005	Toy Story 2 (2-Disc Special Edition.)
2005	Bambi (Disney Special Platinum Edition.)
2005	Charlie and the Chocolate Factory (2-Disc Deluxe Edition.)
2005	Cinderella (2-Disc Special Edition.)
2005	Madagascar (Widescreen Edition.)
2005	The Muppet Movie (For Kermit's 50th Anniversary Edition.)
2005	The Sisterhood of the Traveling Pants (Widescreen Edition.)
2005	The Sound of Music (40th Anniversary Edition.)
2005	The Wizard of Oz (Three Disc Collector's Edition.)
2006	The Little Mermaid
2006	Akeelah and the Bee
2006	Cars
2006	Eight Below
2006	The Greatest Game Ever Played
2006	Ice Age: The Meltdown
2006	Lady and the Tramp
2006	Nanny McPhee
2006	Wallace & Gromit: The Curse of the Were-Rabbit
2007	Ratatouille
2007	Care Bears (For the Care Bears 25th anniversary edition.)
2007	Cars
2007	Charlotte's Web
2007	Gracie
2007	The Jungle Book (For the two disc 40th anniversary platinum edition.)
2007	Little Robots (For episode "Reach for the Sky".)
2007	The Many Adventures of Winnie the Pooh
2007	The Pebble and the Penguin
2007	Peter Pan (For the platinum edition.)
2007	Transformers (For the two disc special edition.)
2008	WarGames (25th Anniversary Edition)
2008	Avatar: The Last Airbender (Book 3 Fire, Vol. 4)
2008	Bee Movie
2008	Enchanted
2008	Nim's Island
2008	One Hundred and One Dalmatians (Two-Disc Platinum Edition DVD)
2008	Sleeping Beauty (Two-Disc 50th Anniversary Platinum Edition Blu-Ray and DVD)
2008	The Spiderwick Chronicles
2008	WALL-E (Three-Disc Special Edition)
2008	The Water Horse (Two-Disc Edition)
2008	Watership Down (Deluxe Edition)
2009	The Wizard of Oz (70th Anniversary - Two Disc Special Edition)
2009	Bolt (Two Disc Deluxe Edition)
2009	A Charlie Brown Christmas, Charlie Brown's All-Stars, It's the Great Pumpkin, Charlie Brown, You're in Love, Charlie Brown, He's Your Dog, Charlie Brown, and It Was a Short Summer, Charlie Brown (Peanuts: 1960s Collection)
2009	Ice Age: Dawn of the Dinosaurs (Double DVD Pack)
2009	Sesame Street (Sesame Street - 40 Years of Sunny Days)
2009	Up (70th Anniversary Ultimate Collector's Edition)
2011	The Lion King (Two-Disc DVD & Blu-Ray Diamond Edition)
2011	Harry Potter and the Sorcerer's Stone, Harry Potter and the Chamber of Secrets, Harry Potter and the Prisoner of Azkaban, Harry Potter and the Goblet of Fire, Harry Potter and the Order of the Phoenix, Harry Potter and the Half-Blood Prince, Harry Potter and the Deathly Hallows – Part 1, and Harry Potter and the Deathly Hallows – Part 2 (Harry Potter: The Complete 8 Film Collection)
2011	The Rocketeer (20th Anniversary Blu-Ray Disc)
2011	Rocky and His Friends (Rocky & Bullwinkle & Friends DVD)
2011	Secretariat

=== Outstanding Youth Blu-Ray ===
Year	Winners and nominees
2013	Rise of the Guardians (Two-Disc 50th Anniversary Platinum Edition Blu-Ray and DVD)
2013	The Croods
2013	Monsters University (Monsters University Collector's Edition)
2013	The Muppet Movie
2013	Planes
2013	The Smurfs 2
2014	How to Train Your Dragon 2
2014	The Fault in Our Stars
2014	Frozen
2014	The Lego Movie
2016	Zootopia
2016	The BFG
2016	Finding Dory
2016	The Secret Life of Pets
2016	Trolls
