= List of Peanuts characters =

This is a list of characters from the comic strip Peanuts by Charles M. Schulz. This list contains limited information on the characters; for more, visit their respective articles.

== Main characters ==
Character	Date introduced	Last appearance	Character traits
Charlie Brown	October 2, 1950	February 13, 2000	The main character, an average yet emotionally mature, gentle, considerate, and often innocent boy who has an ever-changing mood and grace; he is regarded as an embarrassment and a loser by other children and is strongly disliked and rejected by most of them; he takes his frequent failures personally, yet rises out of nearly every downfall with renewed optimism and determination.
Patty	October 2, 1950	November 27, 1997	An early character who never really developed a distinct personality of her own. By mid-1963, she was seen only occasionally, making widely spaced background or minor appearances. She was merged with Violet and Frieda as a composite character in the 1967 off-Broadway musical You're a Good Man, Charlie Brown.
Shermy	October 2, 1950	June 15, 1969 (possibly November 9, 1975)	Another early character who was Charlie Brown's best friend and straight man before Linus, Schroeder and Franklin came into the picture. Began fading into obscurity in mid-1954 and, by late 1966, was seen only in widely spaced cameos.
Snoopy	October 4, 1950	February 13, 2000	Charlie Brown's pet dog, a beagle. Intelligent beyond his species, he is independent-minded and prone to daydreaming and fantasies.
Violet Gray	February 7, 1951	November 27, 1997	Patty and Lucy's best friend; a vain and snobby girl; served as an early love interest of Charlie Brown. She was usually seen with Patty, and like that character, Violet was slowly phased out of the strip throughout the 1960s, thereafter making only infrequent background or cameo appearances.
Schroeder	May 30, 1951	September 12, 1999	Piano-playing prodigy and catcher on Charlie Brown's baseball team; Lucy's unrequited love interest; ardent admirer of Beethoven; Charlie Brown's closest friend besides Linus.
Lucy Van Pelt	March 3, 1952	December 13, 1999	Linus' older sister; a bossy, fussy, crabby girl who sometimes torments Charlie Brown, frequently bullies Linus, battles with Snoopy, and who has a crush on Schroeder.
Linus Van Pelt	September 19, 1952	January 1, 2000	Lucy's younger brother; Charlie Brown's blanket-toting best friend; Sally's unrequited love interest; the most insecure but the smartest and most intellectual out of all the characters; a frequent philosopher and theologian.
Pig-Pen	July 13, 1954	September 8, 1999	The character who attracts dust, making him extremely filthy. In one strip, Pig-Pen is perfectly clean, until he steps outside and instantly becomes dirty. "I'm a dust magnet!" he tells an incredulous Charlie Brown.
Sally Brown	August 23, 1959	February 6, 2000	Charlie Brown's younger sister who has a crush on Linus; often complains, overreacts or overanalyzes situations; she often shows little respect for her older brother.
Frieda	March 6, 1961	November 22, 1985	The girl who brags about her "naturally curly hair" and is quite obsessed about her beauty. Introduced in 1961, Frieda was already being phased out by late 1966 and, after 1975, made only background appearances. In a running gag, Frieda tries to force Snoopy to chase rabbits against his will.
Woodstock	March 4, 1966	January 16, 2000	Snoopy's best friend; a tiny yellow bird. First seen in early 1966, Schulz did not give him a name until June 22, 1970.
Peppermint Patty	August 22, 1966	February 12, 2000	A freckle-faced tomboy who has a crush on Charlie Brown, whom she calls "Chuck"; leader of a baseball team and one of Charlie Brown's rival managers; she has difficulties with school, where she often falls asleep at her desk; for several years she did not realize Snoopy was a dog.
Franklin Armstrong	July 31, 1968	November 5, 1999	An African-American child; was initially bemused by the strange kids (and Snoopy) in Charlie Brown's neighborhood; has intelligence and rationality comparable to Linus; plays on Peppermint Patty's baseball team.
Marcie Carlin	July 20, 1971	January 2, 2000	A mild-mannered, plain and bookish girl; Peppermint Patty's best friend despite their different personalities; calls Peppermint Patty "Sir"; secretly likes Charlie Brown whom she calls "Charles".
Rerun Van Pelt	March 26, 1973	January 30, 2000	Younger brother of Linus and Lucy; frequently rides on the back of his mother's bicycle; often takes his siblings' places and roles.
Eudora	June 13, 1978	June 13, 1987	Sally's best friend; a girl she met at a camp who then moved down the street. Their friendship is often tested by Eudora's crush on Linus.

== Supporting characters ==
=== Other children ===
Character	Date introduced	Last appearance	Character traits
Charlotte Braun	November 30, 1954	February 1, 1955	A character experimented with by Schulz in early comics. Originally conceived as a female counterpart to Charlie Brown (to whom she actively denies having any similarities), she has an obnoxious and dominating personality which is displayed by her speaking loudly and quickly. The character was short-lived and dropped after 10 appearances due to her unpopularity with both Schulz and audiences.
Faron	May 5, 1961	November 20, 1961	A lazy, droopy, useless cat that Frieda buys to try and scare Snoopy into chasing rabbits, only for his appearance to be anticlimactic. He rarely speaks or walks, being carried everywhere by Frieda, and is often foisted onto others while Frieda runs errands. Schulz dropped Faron (named for country singer Faron Young) as he felt he could not adequately draw a cat, and that the character made Snoopy behave too much like a "real" dog.
555 "5" 95472	September 30, 1963	May 22, 1983	A boy close in age to Charlie Brown. 5 had brown spiky hair, and he wore an orange shirt with the number 5 on it. 5 also played for Charlie Brown's baseball team. 5 was given a numerical name by his father, who was upset over the preponderance of numbers in people's lives; when questioned, 5 clarified that this was not his father's way of protesting, it was his way of "giving in." 5 has two sisters named 3 & 4. His last name, 95472 (the accent is on the "4"), was taken from the family's ZIP code; it is also the zip code for Sebastopol, California, where Schulz lived at the time.
3 and 4 (333 95472 and 444 95472)	October 17, 1963	October 20, 1968	333 and 444 (3 and 4 for short) were the dark-haired, twin sisters of 5 ("those are nice feminine names," Charlie Brown dryly commented.)
Roy	June 11, 1965	May 27, 1984	A lonely boy who makes Charlie Brown his friend at summer camp, and does the same for Linus the next year. Roy appeared only at summer camps for many years, although later on he was shown in the background of baseball games and crowd scenes, and as a classmate of Peppermint Patty. Initially he was Peppermint Patty's confidant, although this role was later adopted by Marcie.
José Peterson	March 20, 1967	September 24, 1969	A half-Mexican, half-Swedish member of Peppermint Patty's baseball team. He is excellent at the game and is held in high regard by his team.
Clara, Sophie and Shirley	June 18, 1968	July 22, 1987 (Clara); August 19, 1987 (Sophie); July 20, 1987 (Shirley)	Three young girls who attend a summer camp where Peppermint Patty is their tent monitor. Sophie was the first character to call Peppermint Patty "Sir", a trait more identified with Marcie.
Thibault	June 4, 1970	August 4, 1973	A member of Peppermint Patty's baseball team, who borrows Charlie Brown's baseball glove and then refuses to give it back, instead challenging him to a fight for ownership of said glove as he believes Charlie Brown to be better than him. Elated at being perceived as superior, Charlie Brown lets him keep the glove. He later appears bullying Marcie with chauvinistic comments after she is appointed to the team, pushing the placid Marcie to the point where she beats up Thibault and resigns from the team. He does not appear afterwards.
Loretta	May 22, 1974	July 27, 1974	A girl scout Snoopy encounters during a Beagle Scout trip determined to sell him cookies. She later attends a party with Charlie Brown where she embarrasses him. She invites him to her house, ostensibly to apologize, but tries to offload cookies onto him instead.
Truffles	March 31, 1975	January 29, 1977	A farmer's granddaughter who encounters Linus and Snoopy on their hunt for the World Famous Truffle Hound, named as such because her grandfather says she is "rare as truffles". Both Linus and Snoopy immediately fall in love with Truffles, and Snoopy returns often to the farm to be fed cookies; however, Linus cannot remember the way back and becomes depressed, especially as Snoopy refuses to help him. She calls Linus to inform him that she is returning home, sending him further into depression, although this is alleviated at Christmas when she sends Linus a card (and a solid silver water bowl to Snoopy). A year later, Linus goes on a school field trip to a farm which he later realises is Truffles' grandfather's, and he is thrilled to see her again. However, Truffles and Sally clash over their romantic interest in Linus, leading to him climbing onto a roof to avoid the squabbling girls.
Floyd	July 26, 1976	August 6, 1976	A boy who sits behind Marcie on the bus to summer camp and falls in love with her, trying to win her over with the pet name "Lambcake". Marcie, assuming he is mocking her, is unflattered and responds by hitting him with her lunchbox, a first aid kit, shoving him off a pier into a lake and pushing him into a patch of poison oak. Floyd's persistence continues unrewarded, and by the time camp is over he is depressed that he cannot write to Marcie as he knows neither her surname nor address.
The Goose Eggs (Austin, Leland, Milo and Ruby)	March 11, 1977 (Austin and Ruby); March 17, 1977 (Leland); March 18, 1977 (Milo)	March 17, 1977 (Leland); March 30, 1977 (Ruby); April 1, 1977 (Austin); April 2, 1977 (Milo)	A group of smaller children who ask Charlie Brown to be captain of their baseball team. He accepts, partly due to being on the run from the Environmental Protection Agency after biting the Kite-Eating Tree, and partly because he likes the respect he receives from the group, who all call him "Charles". His tenure ends when he finds out during a match against his old team that the Kite-Eating Tree was blown down in a storm, and he returns safely to his neighborhood. Milo tells Charlie Brown that he wants to grow up and be just like him, which Charlie Brown makes sure everyone hears.
Molly Volley	6 May 1977	16 September 1990	Snoopy's mixed doubles partner, an aggressive and competitive player who despises her chief rival "Crybaby" Boobie and her stage-mother (although she has no issue with "Crybaby"'s elder brother, Bobby). She also hates being referred to as "Fat Legs Volley", due to insecurities about her weight, although once over the shock of being referred to as such her anger overtakes. She is kinder to Charlie Brown than most of his friends and confides in him occasionally, although she become exasperated over Snoopy's poor tennis playing and refuses to be his partner ever again.
"Crybaby" Boobie	July 5, 1978	March 10, 1997	A frequently-complaining tennis player often pitted against Snoopy and Molly Volley in mixed doubles. Her nickname comes from her constant whining about perceived unfairness against her, which often irks her competitors. "Crybaby"'s mother attends all her matches, giving aggressive coaching and praise that distracts from the match. Other characters are often surprised by her nickname. Her face is shown only in her final appearance; until then, her head is tilted back to display her large open mouth.
Joe Richkid	June 22, 1981	July 3, 1981	An arrogant contestant in a golf tournament where he and his unnamed caddy compete against Peppermint Patty and Marcie and Snoopy (as "The Masked Marvel") and Spike. He refuses to shake hands with his competitors for fear they will smudge his white turtleneck, and loses his temper when Marcie shoves his caddy into a lake, ending the match as she also threw Peppermint Patty's in the lake after him.
Joe's caddy	June 24, 1981	July 2, 1981	Joe Richkid's caddy at the golf tournament. He takes an interest in Marcie and asks her on a date once the tournament is finished, but she responds by throwing him into a lake.
"Badcall" Benny	April 16, 1982	April 30, 1982	"Crybaby" Boobie's partner at mixed doubles tennis, legendary for calling everything as "out". He is extremely rude and calls Molly Volley "Fat Legs Volley", which earns him a punch in the mouth; afterwards he is so afraid of Molly Volley hitting him again he is too afraid to talk.
Harold Angel	December 24, 1983	May 20, 1984	A boy in Sally's class at school, who first appears in Sally's Christmas play, although Charlie Brown and Linus assume that Sally had made a misunderstanding. He later reappears trying to take Sally to the movies.
Lydia	June 9, 1986	March 23, 1999	A girl who sits behind Linus in class, who after finding out Linus is two months older states that he is "kind of old for me". At first Linus has a crush on her, and it is implied that it is reciprocated, but Lydia's preoccupation with the supposed age difference usually frustrates their interactions. She also changes her name at will, which also serves to frustrate Linus.
Maynard	July 21, 1986	July 29, 1986	Marcie's cousin, who tutors Peppermint Patty after a string or poor grades. His condescending attitude and frequent Bible quotations irritate his pupil, who eventually physically throws him out her house after finding out he is being paid to tutor her and not acting "out the goodness of his heart".
Tapioca Pudding	September 4, 1986	December 1, 1986	The daughter of a man in licensing, who believes her face will soon be on many commercial items (lunchboxes, gift cards, etc) and will make her a millionaire. As such, she introduces herself repeatedly and tries to persuade people they would like merchandise with her face on it, leading them to realize they can't stand conversation with her. Linus likes her enough to ask her on a date, although he quickly grows bored of her conversation. Snoopy tries to become her agent but gives it up when Tapioca realises that the personal appearance he got her - the 1984 Los Angeles Olympic Games opening ceremony - was two years ago and threatens to beat him up. Her name is a parody of the then-popular Strawberry Shortcake dolls, and her hairstyle and self-centeredness draw parallels to Frieda.
Peggy Jean	July 23, 1990	July 11, 1999	Charlie Brown's girlfriend in later years, who refers to him as "Brownie Charles" for the duration of their relationship after he gets flustered introducing himself. They meet at summer camp and remain together until Peggy Jean moves away in mid-1991, and she is then unseen until her final appearance in 1999.
Larry	May 28, 1991	December 19, 1991	A boy in Sally's class at the Bible school she starts, who is eventually kicked out after thinking The Great Gatsby split the Sea of Galilee; only after she has ejected him does Sally discover that Larry is the minister's son. He later returns to apologize to Sally but confesses that he is in love with her. Later in the year, Sally is chastised by Larry and his friends for "yelling at someone just before Christmas".
Cormac	July 17, 1992	November 2, 1992	A younger boy who becomes Charlie Brown's swimming buddy and friend at summer camp, who tells Marcie that she is beautiful. He later moves to the neighborhood and falls immediately in love with Sally when he sits behind her. He tries to send her a love letter, only for Snoopy to eat it.
Royanne Hobbs	April 1, 1993	March 12, 1994	The self-proclaimed great-granddaughter of Roy Hobbs, Royanne appears after Charlie Brown hits his first home run against her baseball team to tell him he has ruined her life. She tries selling a baseball bat used by her "ancestor", despite knowing he is fictional, but is unfortunate enough to sell it to Lucy, who lashes out when she finds out she had been conned.
Ethan	July 14, 1993	July 15, 1993	Charlie Brown's bunkmate at summer camp, who wants to be a newspaper columnist due to his strong opinions. He demonstrates these opinions by telling Charlie Brown his shirt is stupid.
Emily	February 11, 1995	August 13, 1999	A girl who asks Charlie Brown to dance at a class with her, much to his delight. However, when they dance, Charlie Brown is actually dancing by himself and talking to someone who is not there, implying that she is a figment of his imagination. Emily later returns as an occasional girlfriend of Charlie Brown's, inviting him to a Sweetheart's Ball and further dance classes, where her existence is acknowledged by other characters (especially Snoopy).
The Little Pig-Tailed Girl	September 11, 1996	January 30, 2000	A girl in Rerun's kindergarten class who seems to enjoy school, and finds frequent fault in him and his paintings in Art class. She gets Rerun suspended from school for harassment after he makes a joke about them running away to Paris. Rerun seems to have a small crush on her.
Naomi	October 1, 1998	October 10, 1998	A girl who takes Spike to an animal hospital believing, based from his appearance, that he is ill. Spike decides she is the "Hollywood-type Girl" he has been looking for, and hopes that she will keep him after his recuperation, but she eventually takes him back to the desert. Naomi was the last new character to feature in the strip.

=== Beagle scouts ===
Character	Date introduced	Last appearance	Character traits
Bill	March 27, 1978	November 19, 1999	A cream bird of above-average intelligence who is not quite as smart as Woodstock. In 1983, Bill and Harriet decide to marry at Point Lobos and relocate there, sending Snoopy wedding pictures instead of the wildlife pictures he had asked for. They eventually move back and rejoin the troop. He occasionally suffers from a sore throat.
Conrad	March 27, 1978	November 19, 1999	A cyan bird who in 1984 receives the "Beagle Scout Award" for completing all of the tests set for him; however, he is not able to withstand the weight of the badge Snoopy attaches to his hat. His name may be a reference to Conrad Birdie, of the musical Bye Bye Birdie.
Olivier	March 27, 1978	November 19, 1999	A relatively clueless and accident-prone green bird who frequently asks unusual questions and gives improper responses to the roll call. He also brings odd and unnecessary items on campouts.
Harriet	May 12, 1980	June 30, 1983	The only yellow girl in the troop, who was introduced to the group by Olivier. Snoopy initially didn't want her to be a member, but was won over by Harriet's angel food cake with seven-minute frosting, which earned her a place. In 1980, after the group went out to drink root beer and got in a fight with some bluejays, Harriet was jailed for hitting the bluejays in the face with angel food cake, resulting in Charlie Brown having to bail her out from jail (the Humane Society). In 1983, Bill and Harriet decide to marry at Point Lobos and relocate there, although they later return. Harriet was often more intelligent than the rest of the group.
Wilson	December 2, 1984		A light blue member of the troop who attended a nature hike.
Raymond	October 13, 1988	July 21, 1997	A member of the troop darker in colour than everyone else.
Fred	April 2, 1990	June 1, 1998	An orange background member of the troop. He rarely speaks.
Roy	April 18, 1998		A dark blue talkative member of the troop who likes to explain everything.

=== Snoopy's siblings ===
Character	Date introduced	Last appearance	Character traits
Spike	August 13, 1975	December 21, 1999	Snoopy's skinny brother who lives in the desert near Needles, California. He has a thin moustache and a battered hat, and originally lived among coyotes who mistreated him until they left, at which point Spike made his home with a nearby (occasionally sentient) cactus. He often visits Snoopy and his neighborhood, staying several times and often surprising people by how thin he is. He also appears often in Snoopy's fantasies, as a straight man or assistant to Snoopy's more daring hero. Spike became a regular character in later years, and in 1996 received shoes from Mickey Mouse that he wore in all his subsequent appearances.
Belle	June 28, 1976	May 11, 1981	Snoopy's lovable sister who lives near Kansas City, whom he decides to visit while attempting to attend Wimbledon. He stays for a few days, detailing his visit to Charlie Brown and Linus in letters, where he expresses his disappointment in Belle's unnamed teenage son, a supposedly-thoroughbred beagle who Snoopy believes better resembles the Pink Panther. Belle later returns in one of Snoopy's stories, as a Red Cross nurse who serves at a cafe frequented by Snoopy (as the "WWI Flying Ace") and Spike. Despite her rather minimal presence in the strip, Belle featured heavily in Peanuts-related merchandise in the 1980s.
Marbles	September 28, 1982	October 9, 1982	Snoopy's long-lost brother with spotted, floppy ears and shoes. He visits after losing his home and stays with Snoopy, although (unlike Spike and Belle) he is unwilling to tolerate Snoopy's fantasy adventures with The Red Baron. After a few days he leaves the neighborhood, baffled by Snoopy's make-believe, and is not seen or referred to again. Snoopy remembers him as being the smartest in the family.
Olaf	January 19, 1989	September 27, 1999	Snoopy's somewhat larger brother, who first appears as an entrant (and later winner) in an "Ugly Dog Contest"; the character was initially referred to as "Ugly Olaf", and his appearances centred around jokes on his appearance. This element was later dropped. In 1994 Olaf was at Snoopy's hospital bedside when he contracted pneumonia, and after his recovery Olaf and his brother Andy decided to move to Needles, California and live with Spike, however they kept getting continually lost (and on occasion walked right past him) until they arrived at Snoopy's doghouse five years later, before setting off again and deciding to purchase banjos. Aside from his portly stature, Olaf has a sharp wit and wry sense of humour.
Molly and Rover	Snoopy's Reunion; May 1, 1991		Snoopy's two siblings who did not appear physically in the comic strip, although they are indirectly referenced on several occasions. Molly appears similar in appearance to Belle and Rover to Snoopy. They reunite with their siblings when the Daisy Hill Puppy Farm is due to be demolished, playing an instrument in the siblings' band.
Andy	February 14, 1994	September 27, 1999	Andy first appears visiting Snoopy in hospital, after Snoopy contracts pneumonia; he, Olaf and Spike wait patiently by his bedside, sharing updates and overheard hospital gossip. He initially lived with Olaf on a farm, but shortly after Snoopy's recovery they decided to move to Needles, California and live with Spike; their journey took five years until they arrived at Snoopy's doghouse. Andy was similar in appearance to Snoopy, except that his hair was fuzzy. The character was modeled after a wire-haired terrier owned by Schulz.

=== "Inanimate" characters ===
Character	Date introduced	Last appearance	Character traits
The Kite-Eating Tree	April 12, 1956	February 26, 1995	An anthropomorphic tree and a frequent enemy of Charlie Brown, often shown with a giant, pointed smile in its leaves when Charlie Brown approaches with a kite, and is occasionally given thought bubbles. Although appearing from 1956, it is not identified as the "Kite-Eating Tree" until the March 14, 1965 strip. Despite frequently losing his kites to the tree, Charlie Brown continues to fly his kite near it, occasionally lashed out at the tree. In 1977 he is so angered by the tree's repeated antagonism that he bites it, leading to an investigation by the Environmental Protection Agency that causes him to flee the area; later on, when he encounters his baseball team while on the run, he learns that the Kite-Eating Tree fell down during a storm and the EPA to close their investigation. Despite this, the Kite-Eating Tree continues to appear until February 1995, from whereon it does not appear. In its resulting absence, Charlie Brown continued to get his kites stuck in other trees. Notably, Lucy once threw Schroeder's piano into the tree, frustrated by Schroeder giving the piano more attention than her.
The school building	July 8, 1971	January 12, 1976	Sally Brown's school. It is the only building to regularly feature within the strip, and is perhaps the strip's most unusual character, as the building's "thoughts" are often displayed in thought bubbles. Despite initially hating the building and what it represents, Sally comes to realise that the building - unlike the PTA and the principal - will listen to her educational grievances, and as such she shares her feelings with it. Occasionally it responds, once with a heart symbol in a thought bubble after Sally hugs it, and once by dropping a brick on Linus' head after Sally describes him as her boyfriend. She also once sent an embarrassed Charlie Brown to speak to the school when she was sick. After a short spell of existential depression in 1976, the school commits suicide by collapsing (making it the only Peanuts character to die in any way), which greatly upsets Sally. A new school building is erected in its place but does not share a strong bond with Sally, who it brands a "weirdo".

== Unseen characters ==
There have been several characters which have not been shown in the comic strip, such as the Little Red-Haired Girl and the Great Pumpkin.

=== The Little Red-Haired Girl ===
Little Red-Haired Girl
- Peanuts character
- First appearance: November 19, 1961
- Last appearance: November 29, 1999
- Voiced by: Francesca Angelucci Capaldi (2015, in The Peanuts Movie)

In-universe information
- Gender: Female

The Little Red-Haired Girl is a female character who has red hair and is Charlie Brown's unrequited love interest through most of the strip, first mentioned by him on November 19, 1961. She is not shown for most of the strips and is known simply as "the little red-haired girl". She appears in the animated television specials It's Your First Kiss, Charlie Brown (1977) and Happy New Year, Charlie Brown! (1986), and her name is given as Heather Wold. Schulz first publicly suggested that name for her in an article in the February 1968 issue of Woman's Day magazine, but did not utilize it in the strip. She also makes a brief appearance in the 1988 TV special Snoopy!!! The Musical. She is a main character in The Peanuts Movie. (She moves in and Charlie Brown becomes infatuated with her, and, over the course of the film she develops a liking for him, and becomes his pen-pal.)

=== Morag (the "Pencil-Pal") ===
Morag
- Peanuts character
- First appearance: August 25, 1958
- Last appearance: August 14, 1998

In-universe information
- Gender: Female
- Nationality: Scottish

In 1958, Charlie Brown had a pen pal, but, after several frustrating attempts at writing with a fountain pen result in only messy smudges, Charlie instead addresses and writes to her as a "pencil-pal". When asked by Lucy what they write about, he says, "She tells me about her country, and I tell her about ours...", so it is presumed that she does not live in the U.S. In one strip, Charlie Brown writes to her, telling her that she is his only friend, with the postscript "Everyone hates me". She is known to have written back to Charlie Brown at least once, when he reads his letter to Lucy, reading that she and her class at school all agree that Charlie Brown must be a very pleasant person. In a strip series in 1994, the Pen Pal was revealed to be a girl in Glasgow, Scotland, named Morag.

=== World War II ("The Cat Next Door") ===
World War II
- Peanuts character
- First appearance: November 23, 1958
- Last appearance: Unknown

A never-seen cat lives next door to Charlie Brown and Snoopy. The main focus on this cat occurred during the 1970s, although Charlie Brown referred to "the cat next door" as early as November 23, 1958. Snoopy often taunts this cat (usually starting with, "Hey, stupid cat!"), who generally responds by violently carving up his doghouse in a single swipe. They often have fights, especially on one occasion when Snoopy was told that the cat was attacking Woodstock (which later turned out to be a yellow glove), with Snoopy generally coming worse off. The neighbors who own the cat have complained to Charlie Brown about Snoopy harassing their "kitten". The cat's name was revealed to be "World War II" in the October 20, 1976 strip.

=== The Great Pumpkin ===
The Great Pumpkin
- Peanuts character
- First appearance: October 26, 1959
- Last appearance: October 31, 1999

In-universe information
- Gender: Male

The Great Pumpkin is a fictional entity that Linus van Pelt believes in wholeheartedly, despite the widespread disbelief and mockery of his friends.

According to Linus, the Great Pumpkin rises every Hallowe'en night and distributes gifts to those who believe in his existence. Linus' belief in the Great Pumpkin is rarely deterred, despite never having seen it, although he and Sally Brown (who often accompanies Linus to the pumpkin fields out of loyalty) often mistake other things to be the Great Pumpkin, although these sightings are often the result of Snoopy playing a prank on them.

Although the Great Pumpkin is often believed to be a fictional character, a series of strips running in October and November 1961 have radio reports of the Great Pumpkin being sighted; however, this is disregarded in future years.

=== Adults ===
Adults in the strip are typically unseen. In the 1950s strips, Mrs. Van Pelt (Linus and Lucy's mother) was a semi-regular character, conversing with her children from just outside the frame (with her speech bubbles fully visible and intelligible). Mrs. Van Pelt's dialogue was eventually phased out in favor of a style in which adults' dialogue was only implied and the conversations depicted solely from the child characters' side; in the Peanuts animated cartoons, this was adapted as the adults' "speaking" being represented by the unintelligible sounds of a muted trombone ("mwah-mwah-mwah"). Examples of such characters are the characters' parents and family members (like Linus' blanket-hating grandmother), the characters' schoolteachers, Charlie Brown's baseball hero Joe Shlabotnik, and Helen Sweetstory, author of the Bunny Wunny books.

In the 1966 animated TV special Charlie Brown's All-Stars and its accompanying book, Mr. Hennessy, proprietor of Hennessy's Hardware store, talks to Charlie Brown on the phone, unseen, to confirm his sponsorship of Charlie Brown's baseball team in a real league with real baseball uniforms, but changes his mind when Charlie Brown tells him that girls and a dog are on his team.

==== The Red Baron ====
Red Baron
- Peanuts character
- First appearance: October 10, 1965
- Last appearance: July 18, 1999

In-universe information
- Gender: Male

The Red Baron is an adversary of Snoopy, under the guise of his "World War I Flying Ace" persona.

Although never seen in the strips, Snoopy and the Red Baron often battle against each other; despite Snoopy's best attempts, the Red Baron often wins their dogfights, causing Snoopy to fall from the roof of his kennel (which doubled as the Flying Ace's "Sopwith Camel") and curse his opponent. Snoopy's battles with the Red Baron were a popular feature of the comic strip, and featured frequently.

Schulz took the Red Baron directly from history, based on the real-life wartime career of Manfred von Richthofen.

==== Joe Shlabotnik ====
Joe Shlabotnik
- Peanuts character
- First appearance: August 18, 1963
- Last appearance: January 3, 1997

In-universe information
- Gender: Male
- Occupation: Baseball player

Joe Shlabotnik is a minor-league baseball player who, inexplicably, is greatly admired by Charlie Brown. He never appears in the strip, but is occasionally mentioned by Charlie Brown as his hero and is part of several plots involving Charlie Brown:

- Even before the minor character was introduced, Schroeder made up the name (albeit as composer "Joseph Shlabotnik") to impress Charlie Brown with his "knowledge".
- Joe is introduced (with no name yet) when Charlie Brown reads in the paper that his "baseball hero" is sent down to the minor leagues for a low batting average.
- In 1963, Charlie Brown spends $5 ($52.58 in 2025) on 500 penny packs of bubble-gum cards (incidentally, the last year that Topps offered penny packs) to get a Joe Shlabotnik card, but none of the 500 cards he buys has Joe's picture. Lucy then buys one penny pack, and it turns out to be a Joe card. Charlie Brown offers Lucy his entire baseball card collection in trade for Lucy's Joe Shlabotnik card, which he has been trying to get for five years. Lucy declines, then (after Charlie Brown walks away, dejected) throws the card into a trash can, deciding Joe is "not as cute as I thought he was."
- In his Joe Shlabotnik Fan Club News, Charlie Brown writes that Joe, now playing in the Green Grass League, batted .143, made some "spectacular catches of routine fly balls" and "threw out a runner who had fallen down between first and second." The newsletter lasts only one issue, owing to Lucy's comment on it: "Who needs it?"
- Charlie Brown and Linus attend a sports banquet so that Charlie Brown can sit next to planned attendee Joe Shlabotnik, who does not show up because he had "marked the wrong date on his calendar, the wrong city, and the wrong event."
- Charlie Brown's baseball teammates invite Joe to be guest speaker at a testimonial dinner honoring Charlie Brown's dedication as their manager. Joe accepts the invitation for a reduced speaking fee (down from his usual $100 fee), because all they can offer is 50 cents. However, they cancel the dinner at the last minute when they decide it would be hypocritical because they would be giving Charlie Brown untruthful praise. Joe gets lost along the way and does not show up for the dinner.
- Charlie Brown discovers that Joe is managing the Waffletown Syrups in a location near his summer camp, so Charlie Brown attends the game and cheers Joe on as he manages. Somehow catching a foul ball, Charlie Brown waits after the game for Joe to sign it, only to find out that he has been fired for "signaling for a squeeze play with nobody on base." Charlie Brown finally meets Joe in person when he catches up with Joe as his bus is about to leave. Joe autographs the baseball, but hits Charlie Brown on the head with it (demonstrating his incompetence in baseball) when he throws it to him as the bus departs.
- In a series of strips in 1996–97, Charlie Brown purchases a baseball signed by Joe Shlabotnik, but it turns out to be a forgery.
- Schroeder points out that the reason Joe Shlabotnik is sent back down to the minors is because he has a .004 batting average.

=== Teachers ===
Aside from Linus van Pelt's teacher Miss Othmar and her replacement, Miss Halverson, few other teachers were mentioned by name in Peanuts (and none were ever drawn), with the children most often addressing their teacher as "Ma'am" (only once was a male teacher mentioned, in the "GEORGE WASHINGTON!!!" storyline from 1967 featuring Sally and Charlie Brown).

In the 1966 strip storyline about Charlie Brown's competing in the class spelling bee (later adapted into the movie A Boy Named Charlie Brown), Charlie Brown mentions that his teacher's name is Mrs. Donovan, but he was later shown in Miss Othmar's class with Linus. Peppermint Patty and Marcie's teacher was named Miss Swanson in the early 1970s, but had changed to Miss Tenure by 1978, in a storyline in which Patty disguised herself as a janitor to investigate the theft of Miss Tenure's box of gold star stickers and to clear her name of said theft. On August 24, 1993, in conversation with Marcie, Peppermint Patty refers to her book report as being written for Miss Davis. Marcie reveals to her that Miss Davis quit two years previous to have a baby.

Miss Othmar

Miss Othmar
- Peanuts character
- First appearance: October 5, 1959
- Last appearance: August 24, 1993 (comic strip); The Peanuts Movie (film); Peanuts (2016 TV series)

In-universe information
- Gender: Female
- Family: Mr. Hagemeyer (husband)

Miss Othmar served as Linus' teacher starting in 1959. There was a series of comics where Linus had to bring egg shells to class so she could teach the class about igloos but Linus kept forgetting to bring the shells. Typically, neither the comic strip nor the cartoons depict adults. In the strip, we only see the children's side of the conversations with Miss Othmar. In the cartoons, a muffled horn was used for her voice. This became her—and all other voices of adult characters—trademark in the cartoons and is sometimes parodied in other programs.

Linus developed a long-lasting crush on her. As a result, Linus held her in unreasonable esteem, which made his discovery that she earned a salary for her profession a crushing disillusionment that he tried to rationalize away. When Lucy tells Linus that it is wrong to worship a teacher, Linus denies worshipping Miss Othmar, but he does admit to being "very fond of the ground on which she walks."

Eventually, Miss Othmar married, assuming her married name of Mrs. Hagemeyer; Linus, however, continued to call her Miss Othmar, and other characters in the strip began referring to her as Miss Othmar again as well. (As Linus said, "In real life she's Miss Othmar!")

Although Miss Othmar quit teaching after she got engaged, she returned to teaching a few years later, much to Linus' delight. However, in 1969, Miss Othmar was fired following a teacher's strike, and Linus was devastated. Miss Othmar's replacement was Miss Halverson ("Halverson" being the maiden name of Charles M. Schulz's first wife, Joyce), whom Linus initially refused to accept as his new teacher, although he eventually seemed to learn to live with it.

Miss Othmar talks briefly to Sally in the TV special You're Not Elected, Charlie Brown.

Marcie mentions that she is taking organ lessons from a "Mrs. Hagemeyer" in a 1979 strip, but it is unclear whether this Mrs. Hagemeyer and Miss Othmar are one and the same.

In The Peanuts Movie, her "talking" is provided by New Orleans–based trombonist Trombone Shorty.
