= It Was a Short Summer, Charlie Brown =

1969 television special

- Genre: Animated television special
- Based on: Peanuts by Charles M. Schulz
- Written by: Charles M. Schulz
- Directed by: Bill Melendez
- Voices of: Peter Robbins; Pamelyn Ferdin; Glenn Gilger; Hilary Momberger; Ann Altieri; David Carey; Christopher DeFaria; Gai DeFaria; Sally Dryer; Matthew Liftin; Lisa DeFaria; John Daschback; Bill Melendez
- Music by: Vince Guaraldi
- Opening theme: "It Was a Short Summer, Charlie Brown"
- Ending theme: "It Was a Short Summer, Charlie Brown"
- Country of origin: United States
- Original language: English

Production
- Producers: Lee Mendelson; Bill Melendez
- Editors: Bob Gillis: Chuck McCann; Steve Melendez
- Running time: 25 minutes
- Production companies: Lee Mendelson Film Productions; Bill Melendez Productions

Original release
- Network: CBS
- Release: September 27, 1969

Related
- Charlie Brown and Charles Schulz (1969); Play It Again, Charlie Brown (1971)

It Was a Short Summer, Charlie Brown is the sixth prime-time animated television special based on the comic strip Peanuts, created by Charles M. Schulz. It was directed by Bill Melendez and originally aired on CBS on September 27, 1969.

It Was a Short Summer, Charlie Brown was the first Peanuts special to not receive any Emmy Award nominations.

== Plot ==
As summer vacation begins, Charlie Brown, Linus, Schroeder, and Pig-Pen enthusiastically plan to indulge in comic books, television, baseball, and classical music. However, their excitement is abruptly curtailed when Lucy informs them that she has enrolled them all in summer camp. While the girls eagerly anticipate the adventure, the boys are dismayed by the prospect. The boys, displaying reluctance, jostle one another as they board the bus, while the girls form an orderly line.

Upon arrival at camp, Charlie Brown is appointed captain of the boys' team. The boys and girls engage in a series of competitions, starting with a swimming race in which the girls claim a decisive victory. This is followed by a softball game, where the boys are soundly defeated, scoring only a single run. The remaining contests continue in similarly one-sided fashion, leaving the boys increasingly demoralized.

Feeling dispirited by their relentless losses, Charlie Brown and Shermy witness Snoopy engaging in an arm-wrestling match with the boys. Inspired, they devise a plan to reclaim some pride by organizing an arm-wrestling competition, with "The Masked Marvel" (Snoopy) representing the boys. Snoopy embarks on a rigorous training regimen, consuming the camp's unpalatable food, performing exercises, and drinking a vile yet nutritious concoction. When the match commences, Snoopy faces off against Lucy. The contest is intense, with both participants sweating and growing weary. The match culminates in Snoopy kissing Lucy, which allows him to pin her hand; however, Lucy declares the kiss a foul, claiming victory for herself.

As the new school year begins, Charlie Brown struggles to compose an essay assigned on the first day after he and Linus are caught playing hangman in class. While Linus earns an A, Charlie Brown receives a disappointing C−. Linus philosophically remarks, "Oh, well, it was a short summer, Charlie Brown," to which Charlie responds with resignation, "And it looks like it's going to be a long winter."

== Cast ==
- Peter Robbins as Charlie Brown
- Pamelyn Ferdin as Lucy van Pelt
- Glenn Gilger as Linus van Pelt
- Hilary Momberger as Sally Brown
- Ann Altieri as Frieda and Violet Gray
- David Carey as Shermy
- Christopher DeFaria as Peppermint Patty
- Gai DeFaria as Pig-Pen
- Sally Dryer as Sophie, Clara and Shirley
- Matthew Liftin as Roy
- Lisa DeFaria as Patty
- John Daschback as Schroeder
- Bill Melendez as Snoopy

== Production notes ==
It Was a Short Summer, Charlie Brown was the first Peanuts special to not feature the majority of the original voice cast from the inaugural A Charlie Brown Christmas (1965), who had begun to age out of their roles; Ann Altieri, Sally Dryer and Peter Robbins (in his last appearance voicing Charlie Brown) did return, as did Melendez, who once again not only directed but voiced Snoopy and Woodstock. Among the notable additions to the cast was Pamelyn Ferdin, Robbins's co-star on Blondie, replacing Sally Dryer as Lucy, who instead voiced minor roles. This would also be the only special that Glenn Gilger (Who acted in A Boy Named Charlie Brown (1969) as did most of the other cast here) voiced Linus in.

== Soundtrack ==
The soundtrack for It Was a Short Summer, Charlie Brown was composed by Vince Guaraldi (except where noted) and conducted and arranged by John Scott Trotter. The score was performed by the Vince Guaraldi Decet on September 11–12, 1969, at Western Recorders, featuring Monty Budwig (double bass), Herb Ellis (guitar), Jack Sperling (drums), Victor Feldman (percussion), Frank Rosolino (trombone), Conte Candoli (trumpet), Pete Candoli (trumpet), Peter Christlieb (woodwind) and William Hood (woodwind).

On July 5, 2024, a remastered album featuring the original recordings and several bonus tracks was released to commemorate the 55th anniversary of the special.

== Home media ==
In 1985, Media Home Entertainment released the special on VHS and Betamax along with It's the Great Pumpkin, Charlie Brown and What a Nightmare, Charlie Brown. It was re-released by its kids subdivision Hi-Tops Video in 1989. Paramount Home Media Distribution released the special along with You're Not Elected, Charlie Brown as part of the Snoopy Double Feature: Volume 3 compilation on August 17, 1994. On July 7, 2009, it was released on DVD for the first time, in remastered form as part of the DVD box set, Peanuts 1960s Collection. On October 6, 2015, the special was released in the remastered deluxe edition of He's a Bully, Charlie Brown along with an episode from The Charlie Brown and Snoopy Show as bonus specials.

On October 7, 2025, it was released on the DVD and Blu-Ray collection Peanuts: 75th Anniversary Ultimate TV Specials Collection along with 39 other Peanuts specials.
