= He's Your Dog, Charlie Brown =

1968 Peanuts television special

- Genre: Animated television special
- Based on: Peanuts by Charles M. Schulz
- Written by: Charles M. Schulz
- Directed by: Bill Melendez
- Voices of: Peter Robbins; Gai DeFaria; Chris Shea; Sally Dryer; Bill Melendez; Ann Altieri; Lisa DeFaria; Matthew Liftin; Glenn Mendelson
- Music by: Vince Guaraldi
- Ending theme: "He's Your Dog, Charlie Brown"
- Country of origin: United States
- Original language: English

Production
- Producers: Lee Mendelson; Bill Melendez
- Editors: Robert T. Gillis; Steven Melendez
- Camera setup: Nick Vasu
- Running time: 25 minutes
- Production companies: Lee Mendelson Film Productions; Bill Melendez Productions

Original release
- Network: CBS
- Release: February 14, 1968

Related
- You're in Love, Charlie Brown (1967); Charlie Brown and Charles Schulz (1969)

He's Your Dog, Charlie Brown is the fifth prime-time animated TV special based upon the comic strip Peanuts, by Charles M. Schulz. It was originally broadcast on the CBS network on February 14, 1968.

== Plot ==
Snoopy's persistent mischief is angering the other kids in the neighborhood, and they all demand that Charlie Brown do something about it, as Snoopy is his dog. Charlie Brown will send a reluctant Snoopy back to his birthplace, the Daisy Hill Puppy Farm, for obedience training to appease them. As it is a two-day trip, Charlie Brown calls Peppermint Patty and asks to let Snoopy stay there for one night en route; Peppermint Patty agrees, but a scheming Snoopy decides to stay on and has her waiting on him, hand and foot, which confuses her.

A week later, the Puppy Farm calls Charlie Brown to inform him that Snoopy never arrived. Realizing Snoopy is still at Peppermint Patty's house, Charlie Brown goes over to her house with a leash to take Snoopy home, but the dog escapes and runs back. Peppermint Patty lets Snoopy stay, but instead of returning to the easy life he enjoyed, she puts him to work doing menial chores, much to his dismay.

As the other children start to miss Snoopy, Charlie Brown tries to bring him home again, but Snoopy, still angry at Charlie Brown and the others for what they suggested to do with him, breaks the leash and sends Charlie Brown away again. Devastated by Snoopy’s refusal to return home, and feeling remorsefully guilty for the horrid way they've treated him, and have attempted to do so, Charlie Brown and the other kids call out for him to come home. That night, while doing dishes, upon realizing the mistake he's made, Snoopy, having finally had enough, becomes infuriated and starts breaking dishes, and Peppermint Patty puts him in the garage as punishment. While there, on his behalf, Snoopy feels equally just as guilty and remorseful for how he treated Charlie Brown and the others, and realizes that he has a better life at home and begins to howl incessantly. When Peppermint Patty comes out to check on him, he dashes out of the garage and attacks her, before gathering all his belongings from inside the house and running back home to an overjoyed Charlie Brown, with whom he reconciles and compromises with by promising to behave better if his real owner does not send him away or plan to mistreat him. The next day, after taking Linus on a wild blanket ride and picking a fight with Lucy, the other children are also glad that Snoopy is back. Contented, Snoopy goes to nap on top of his doghouse.

== Voice cast ==
- Peter Robbins as Charlie Brown
- Bill Melendez as Snoopy
- Sally Dryer as Lucy van Pelt
- Chris Shea as Linus van Pelt
- Gai DeFaria as Peppermint Patty
- Glenn Mendelson as Schroeder
- Ann Altieri as Violet
- Lisa DeFaria as Patty
- Matthew Liftin as 5

== Production notes ==
He's Your Dog, Charlie Brown was the last Peanuts special featuring the majority of the original voice cast from the first Peanuts special, A Charlie Brown Christmas. It was also the first special to credit Bill Melendez as the voice of Snoopy.

Both He's Your Dog, Charlie Brown and You're in Love, Charlie Brown were nominated for an Emmy award for Outstanding Achievement in Children's Programming in 1968.

Stock footage from It's the Great Pumpkin, Charlie Brown (1966) is used when Snoopy flies on his doghouse.

The ending segment where Snoopy and Lucy quarrel was inspired by a comic strip storyline that originally ran May 24–29, 1965. It was later adapted for The Charlie Brown and Snoopy Show (1983) episode "Snoopy: Man's Best Friend" and the French television series Peanuts (2014) episode "L'amour du risque".

== Music score ==
The music score for He's Your Dog, Charlie Brown was composed by Vince Guaraldi (except where noted) and conducted and arranged by John Scott Trotter. The score was recorded by the Vince Guaraldi Quintet on January 11, 1968, at United Western Recorders, featuring John Gray (guitar), Frank Strozier (alto saxophone, flute), Ralph Peña (bass), and Colin Bailey (drums).

Retitled variations of several songs previously released on Jazz Impressions of A Boy Named Charlie Brown ("Pebble Beach," "Schroeder") were featured in He's Your Dog, Charlie Brown.

1. "Red Baron"
2. "Red Baron" (reprise)
3. "He's Your Dog, Charlie Brown"
4. "He's Your Dog, Charlie Brown" (reprise)
5. "Peppermint Patty"
6. "He's Your Dog, Charlie Brown" (2nd reprise)
7. "Bon Voyage"
8. "Peppermint Patty" (reprise)
9. "Oh, Good Grief" (Vince Guaraldi, Lee Mendelson)
10. "Happiness Theme"
11. "Charlie Brown and His All-Stars"
12. "Red Baron" (2nd reprise)
13. "Choro" (from the Guaraldi/Bola Sete album From All Sides)
14. "Red Baron" (3rd reprise)
15. "Pebble Beach"
16. "Schroeder"
17. "Pebble Beach" (reprise)
18. "Blue Charlie Brown"
19. "Red Baron" (4th reprise, minor key)
20. "He's Your Dog, Charlie Brown" (3rd reprise)
21. "Linus and Lucy"
22. "He's Your Dog, Charlie Brown" (4th reprise, end credits)

No official soundtrack for He's Your Dog, Charlie Brown has commercially released as of yet, but interest has been addressed by Lee Mendelson Film Productions after their release of It’s A Mystery, Charlie Brown in 2026. However, variations of "Peppermint Patty", "The Red Baron," "Oh, Good Grief," "Linus and Lucy," and the eponymous theme song (mistitled "It's Your Dog, Charlie Brown"), were released on the 1968 album Oh Good Grief!.

== Home media ==
He's Your Dog, Charlie Brown was rebroadcast yearly on CBS between February 1969 and June 1972.

The special was first released on home media in 1982 on RCA's SelectaVision CED format, along with Be My Valentine, Charlie Brown, It's the Easter Beagle, Charlie Brown, and Life Is a Circus, Charlie Brown. It was later released on VHS in 1987 by Hi-Tops Video. Snoopy Double Feature Vol. 2, a VHS release containing He's Your Dog and It's Flashbeagle, Charlie Brown, was released on March 9, 1994 (it would later be re-issued in 1997 after Viacom bought Paramount). The first DVD release came on July 7, 2009, in remastered form as part of the DVD box set Peanuts 1960s Collection. A separate DVD of the special and Life Is a Circus, Charlie Brown was released on September 21, 2010.

On October 7, 2025, it was released on the DVD and Blu-Ray collection Peanuts: 75th Anniversary Ultimate TV Specials Collection along with 39 other Peanuts specials.
