= Charlie Brown and Charles Schulz =

1969 television special

- Genre: Documentary television special
- Created by: Charles M. Schulz
- Composer: Vince Guaraldi

Production
- Producers: Lee Mendelson; Bill Melendez
- Editors: Robert T. Gillis; Steven C. Melendez
- Camera setup: Nick Vasu
- Running time: 30 minutes
- Production companies: Lee Mendelson Film Productions; Bill Melendez Productions

Original release
- Network: CBS
- Release: May 24, 1969

Related
- He's Your Dog, Charlie Brown (1968); It Was a Short Summer, Charlie Brown (1969)

Charlie Brown and Charles Schulz is a 1969 documentary television special about the creator of the Peanuts series, Charles Schulz.

== Background ==
Charlie Brown and Charles Schulz was first broadcast on the CBS television network on May 24, 1969. It features several different segments, including footage from the first Peanuts feature-length film, A Boy Named Charlie Brown, the musical You're a Good Man, Charlie Brown, the music of Vince Guaraldi and The Royal Guardsmen, as well as portions of the unaired 1963 documentary of the same name.

== Music score ==
In addition to featuring the song "You're a Good Man, Charlie Brown" from the musical of the same name, and the Peanuts hit "Snoopy vs. the Red Baron" by The Royal Guardsmen, the documentary also highlights the musical compositions of Vince Guaraldi and his contributions to the Peanuts franchise. Guaraldi’s performance at the 1968 Monterey Jazz Festival is featured among footage revolving around his work.

Additionally, Guaraldi recorded several new cues for the documentary and its animated segments.

== Voice cast ==
- Peter Robbins as Charlie Brown
- Pamelyn Ferdin as Lucy van Pelt
- Glenn Gilger as Linus van Pelt
- Hilary Momberger as Sally Brown
- Bill Melendez as Snoopy
