= You're in Love, Charlie Brown =

1967 television special

- Genre: Animated television special
- Based on: Peanuts by Charles M. Schulz
- Directed by: Bill Melendez
- Voices of: Peter Robbins; Sally Dryer; Chris Shea; Cathy Steinberg; Gai DeFaria; Anne Altieri
- Music by: Vince Guaraldi
- Opening theme: "You're in Love, Charlie Brown"
- Ending theme: "You're in Love, Charlie Brown"
- Original language: English

Production
- Executive producer: Lee Mendelson
- Producer: Bill Melendez
- Editor: Robert T. Gillis
- Camera setup: Nick Vasu Frank Paiker Jack Stevens Jack Eckes Roy Wade
- Running time: 25 minutes
- Production companies: Lee Mendelson Film Productions; Bill Melendez Productions

Original release
- Network: CBS
- Release: June 12, 1967

Related
- It's the Great Pumpkin, Charlie Brown (1966); He's Your Dog, Charlie Brown (1968)

You're in Love, Charlie Brown is the fourth prime-time animated television special based upon the comic strip Peanuts, by Charles M. Schulz. It originally aired on CBS on June 12, 1967. This was the second non-holiday-oriented Peanuts special, following Charlie Brown's All Stars! in 1966.

Both You're in Love, Charlie Brown and He's Your Dog, Charlie Brown were nominated for an Emmy Award for Outstanding Achievement in Children's Programming in 1968.

== Plot ==
As summer approaches, Charlie Brown struggles to enjoy himself like his peers. When he spots the Little Red-Haired Girl on a passing bus, Linus deduces that Charlie Brown is in love.

Determined to catch her attention, Charlie Brown makes several unsuccessful attempts. During the penultimate school day, he accidentally reads a love note instead of his report, becoming the target of ridicule. Later, he unintentionally sharpens his ballpoint pen at the pencil sharpener and fails to muster the courage to approach her during lunch, panicking when she comes near.

Seeking guidance, Charlie Brown visits Lucy's psychiatric booth, but she is preoccupied with Schroeder. Turning to Peppermint Patty, he attempts to explain his situation, but she misinterprets his dilemma and arranges a meeting—mistakenly setting up Lucy, who expects to see Schroeder, leading to an embarrassing mishap.

Before bed that night, Charlie Brown sets his alarm very early, planning to meet the Little Red-Haired Girl at the bus stop. He arrives there before dawn, but accidentally falls back asleep, missing both the opportunity to see her and the school bus. Arriving late to school, a frustrated Charlie Brown lashes out at his teacher and is sent to the principal's office. Later, he fails to impress his crush by solving a difficult math problem.

When school dismisses at noon, Charlie Brown rushes to the bus to find her but is lost in the crowd. As the bus departs, he despairs—until he discovers a note in his hand reading, "I Like You, Charlie Brown. Signed, Little Red-Haired Girl." Overcome with joy, Charlie Brown dances home, envisioning their future together in September, before exclaiming in exasperation, "Good grief! How will I LIVE until September!?"

== Cast ==
- Peter Robbins as Charlie Brown
- Sally Dryer as Lucy van Pelt
- Chris Shea as Linus van Pelt
- Gai DeFaria as Peppermint Patty
- Ann Altieri as Violet
- Kathy Steinberg as Sally Brown
- Bill Melendez as Snoopy

3 and 4, Frieda, Patty, Pig-Pen, Schroeder, and Shermy appear, but are silent.

== Soundtrack ==
The soundtrack for You're in Love, Charlie Brown was composed by Vince Guaraldi (except where noted) and conducted and arranged by John Scott Trotter. The score was recorded by the Vince Guaraldi Sextet on May 17, 1967, at United Western Recorders, featuring Frank Rosolino (trombone), John Gray (guitar), Ronald Lang (woodwinds), Monty Budwig (double bass) and John Rae (drums).

Additionally, the title theme was performed by the West Hillsborough School Choir with direction by choirmaster Al Clover and lyrics by Lee Mendelson.

1. "It's Spring, Charlie Brown Theme" (version 1) (Vince Guaraldi, Lee Mendelson)
2. "You're in Love, Charlie Brown" (version 1, piano)
3. "You're in Love, Charlie Brown" (version 2, vocal) (Guaraldi, Mendelson)
4. "School Days" (version 1, piano) (Will D. Cobb, Gus Edwards)
5. "Red Baron"
6. "Trio Ad-Lib"
7. "Peppermint Patty" (vamp, version 1)
8. "Love Will Come"
9. "You're in Love, Charlie Brown" (version 3, minor key)
10. "You're in Love, Charlie Brown" (version 4, theme parody vocal)
11. "You're in Love, Charlie Brown" (version 5, piano + flute)
12. "Pomp and Circumstance March: No. 1 in D" (Sir Edward Elgar)
13. "Peppermint Patty" (vamp, version 2)
14. "Schroeder Practices"
15. "Schroeder Plays"
16. "Peppermint Patty" (vamp, version 3)
17. "Peppermint Patty" (piano + brass)
18. "Peppermint Patty" (vamp, version 4)
19. "You're in Love, Charlie Brown" (version 6, harpsichord)
20. "Charlie Brown and His All-Stars" (piano + brass)
21. "Charlie Brown Theme" (version 2) (Vince Guaraldi, Lee Mendelson)
22. "School Days" (version 2, horns) (Will D. Cobb, Gus Edwards)
23. "You're in Love, Charlie Brown" (version 7, piano + saxophone, end credits)
24. "Fanfare Finish"

No official soundtrack for You're in Love, Charlie Brown was commercially released. However, "Peppermint Patty" (piano + horns) was made available as a bonus track on the 2005 CD release of Vince Guaraldi with the San Francisco Boys Chorus (1967). In addition, variations of "Red Baron", "Peppermint Patty", and the eponymous theme song were released on the 1968 album Oh Good Grief!.

=== Master recordings discovered ===
Shortly after producer Lee Mendelson died in December 2019, his children began searching through archives for any original music score recordings from the Peanuts television specials. It was during the COVID-19 pandemic lockdown that original monaural analog session recordings for the majority of the specials were discovered.

"The only silver lining for me from this horrible pandemic was it let me stop and look at things we hadn't looked at before," said Jason Mendelson. "We couldn't do very much, so one of the things we did do is I wanted to make some really good albums out of the Charlie Brown music."

On October 6, 2026, it was announced that the tracks "Charlie Brown's All Stars" and a alternate reprise of "You're in Love, Charlie Brown" would be released for the Record Store Day release of Charlie Brown's All Stars's soundtrack, along with eight tracks from previously released albums, scheduled for November 27, 2026, with confirmation that the special's soundtrack will release sometime in 2027.

== Home media ==
The special was first released on home video in 1981 on RCA's SelectaVision CED format as part of the A Charlie Brown Festival compilation. The special was released on VHS by Kartes Video Communications in 1987. It was also paired with Snoopy's Getting Married, Charlie Brown on a 2-pack in 1989. Paramount Home Media Distribution would release the special along with It's Your First Kiss, Charlie Brown on the Snoopy Double Feature: Volume 4 VHS on January 11, 1995.

Along with the special It's Your First Kiss, Charlie Brown, this was released to DVD as a bonus feature on the Be My Valentine, Charlie Brown-Remastered Deluxe Edition DVD on January 15, 2008. On July 7, 2009, it was re-released on DVD, in remastered form as part of the DVD box set, "Peanuts 1960s Collection." It was released on the Happiness is Peanuts: Friends Forever DVD on December 27, 2011.

On October 7, 2025, it was released on the DVD and Blu-Ray collection Peanuts: 75th Anniversary Ultimate TV Specials Collection along with 39 other Peanuts specials.

== Notability ==
You're in Love, Charlie Brown is notable for at least two important firsts:

- It marked the on-screen debut of Peppermint Patty, who first appeared in the comic strip the previous year.
- It was the first special that used "tromboning" (a muted trombone) in place of adult voices, an idea suggested by Vince Guaraldi.
- This was the final time Kathy Steinberg, the original voice of Sally, voiced the character in a special.

Additionally similar to the fight sequences of the 1966 Batman series, it was the only known Peanuts special in which the more intense sound effects are actually spelled out in onomatopoeic words: wiggly "R"s when Charlie Brown's alarm clock goes off, and very hard, straight words "Click Clack" and "Clack" when he opens some school doors silently getting to school late (however, in The Charlie Brown and Snoopy Show episode "Linus and Lucy" the word "Pow" can be seen when Snoopy punches somebody in Sally's class).
