= You Don't Look 40, Charlie Brown =

1990 television documentary

- Genre: Animated television special
- Presented by: Michele Lee
- Country of origin: United States
- Original language: English

Production
- Running time: 22 minutes
- Production companies: Lee Mendelson Film Productions; Bill Melendez Productions

Original release
- Network: CBS
- Release: February 2, 1990

Related
- This Is America, Charlie Brown (1988-89); Why, Charlie Brown, Why? (1990)

You Don't Look 40, Charlie Brown, the first Peanuts television special of the 1990s, is one of many prime-time animated TV specials, based on characters from the Charles M. Schulz comic strip Peanuts. It originally aired on the CBS network on February 2, 1990.

Hosted by Knots Landing star Michele Lee, this special includes a reunion of the many actors and actresses who voiced the Peanuts characters from 1963 to 1989.

The special also has three music videos to promote the album Happy Anniversary, Charlie Brown including "Little Birdie" by Joe Williams, "Linus and Lucy" by David Benoit and "Joe Cool" by B.B. King.

The special was released on VHS through Paramount Home Video.

== Actors and actresses interviewed ==
- Chad Allen (Charlie Brown, 1986)
- Stuart Brotman (Peppermint Patty, 1975–1977)
- Erin Chase (first girl to voice Charlie Brown, 1988–1989)
- Sally Dryer (Lucy van Pelt, 1966–1968)
- Robin Kohn (Lucy van Pelt, 1972–1973)
- Jeremy Miller (Linus van Pelt, 1985–1988)
- Geoffrey Ornstein (Pigpen, 1965)
- Peter Robbins (original Charlie Brown, 1963–1969)
- Heather Stoneman (Lucy van Pelt, 1984–1986)
