= A Boy Named Charlie Brown (1963 film) =

Unaired 1963 television film

- Genre: Documentary
- Created by: Charles M. Schulz
- Written by: Lee Mendelson
- Directed by: Lee Mendelson
- Starring: Charles M. Schulz
- Voices of: Peter Robbins; Christopher Shea; Karen Mendelson; Sally Dryer; Ann Altieri; Tracy Stratford; Chris Doran; Geoffrey Ornstein; Bill Melendez
- Narrated by: Don Sherwood
- Theme music composer: Vince Guaraldi
- Opening theme: "Oh, Good Grief"
- Ending theme: "Oh, Good Grief"
- Composer: Vince Guaraldi
- Country of origin: United States
- Original language: English

Production
- Producer: Lee Mendelson
- Cinematography: Sheldon Fay
- Animator: Playhouse Pictures
- Editor: Sheldon Fay
- Running time: 30 minutes
- Production companies: Lee Mendelson Film Productions; United Feature Syndicate, Inc.

Original release
- Release: December 1963

A Boy Named Charlie Brown is an unaired television documentary film about Charles M. Schulz and his creation Peanuts, produced by Lee Mendelson with some animated scenes by Bill Melendez and music by Vince Guaraldi.

== Background ==
On October 6, 1963, Lee Mendelson, a documentary producer who was then a PSA announcer at KPIX-TV, released a television documentary film about the life and career of baseball legend Willie Mays entitled A Man Named Mays, which aired on NBC that same day. In mid-December 1963, two months after the documentary was released, Mendelson decided that following his film about the best baseball player, he would produce a film about the worst baseball player, Charlie Brown. Mendelson subsequently hired animator Bill Melendez, who had experience working with the Peanuts characters in a handful of commercials for the Ford Motor Company from 1959 until 1962, to direct some interstitial animation based on the strips.

A Boy Named Charlie Brown was screened for the Greater San Francisco Advertising Club in the Spring of 1964, where it was received with considerable enthusiasm, but Mendelson was unsuccessful in securing sponsorship.

Although the special never aired on television and later forfeited, the documentary was instrumental in starting the Greater San Francisco Advertising Committee and garnering commercial support and the creative teamwork that resulted in A Charlie Brown Christmas in 1965 and the ensuing series of Peanuts television specials. It was the first film to carry the Greater San Francisco Advertising Committee policy.

An album by the Vince Guaraldi Trio with music from the above documentary, originally titled Jazz Impressions of A Boy Named Charlie Brown, was released by Fantasy Records in 1964.

Portions of the unaired A Boy Named Charlie Brown were later broadcast in 1969 as Charlie Brown and Charles Schulz, a CBS documentary that preceded the release of Peanuts' first motion picture, also called A Boy Named Charlie Brown.

== Voice cast ==
- Peter Robbins as Charlie Brown.
- Christopher Shea as Linus van Pelt.
- Karen Mendelson as Lucy van Pelt and Patty.
- Sally Dryer as Violet Gray.
- Ann Altieri as Frieda.
- Tracy Stratford provides Lucy van Pelt’s singing voice. Stratford would later go on to do Lucy’s speaking voice.
- Chris Doran as Schroeder and Shermy.
- Geoffrey Ornstein as Pig-Pen.
- Bill Melendez as Snoopy.
- The documentary was Don Sherwood’s last film. Sherwood said that A Boy Named Charlie Brown is the closest project he did to relaying the Greater San Francisco Advertising Committee message.

== Home media ==
A Boy Named Charlie Brown is available on DVD through the Charles M. Schulz Museum and Research Center.
