= Sally Dryer =

American former child voice actress

- Occupation: Actress
- Years active: 1963–1969

Sally Dryer is an American former child voice actress, artist, and store owner best known for her voice-over work in the 1960s.

== Career ==
Dryer provided the voices for several Peanuts characters in television specials and film from 1965 to 1969. Dryer first started as the voice of Violet in A Boy Named Charlie Brown (1963) and A Charlie Brown Christmas (1965), before going on to Lucy in four Peanuts specials Charlie Brown's All-Stars (1966), It's the Great Pumpkin, Charlie Brown (1966), You're in Love, Charlie Brown (1967), and He's Your Dog, Charlie Brown (1968).

Dryer then provided the voice of Patty (not to be confused with the character of Peppermint Patty) in the feature film A Boy Named Charlie Brown. Dryer's last stint with the Peanuts gang was performing the voices of Clara, Shirley, and Sophie in It Was a Short Summer, Charlie Brown.

Dryer also starred as herself in a pair of documentaries on the 1960s Peanuts television phenomenon. Dryer was interviewed on the special documentary You Don't Look 40, Charlie Brown (1990); and on the documentary The Making of "A Charlie Brown Christmas" (2001).

== Personal life ==
She is a lesbian and lives with her partner in Jerome, Arizona.

== Filmography ==
Year	Title	Role	Notes
1963	A Boy Named Charlie Brown	Violet Gray	Voice role
1965	A Charlie Brown Christmas	Violet Gray	Voice role
1966	Charlie Brown's All-Stars!	Lucy van Pelt	Voice role
1966	It's the Great Pumpkin, Charlie Brown	Lucy van Pelt	Voice role
1967	You're in Love, Charlie Brown	Lucy van Pelt	Voice role
1968	He's Your Dog, Charlie Brown	Lucy van Pelt	Voice role
1969	It Was a Short Summer, Charlie Brown	Clara/Shirley/Sophie	Voice role
1969	A Boy Named Charlie Brown	Patty	Voice role
1990	You Don't Look 40, Charlie Brown	Herself	
2001	The Making of "A Charlie Brown Christmas"	Herself	
