= Peter Robbins (actor) =

American actor (1956–2022)

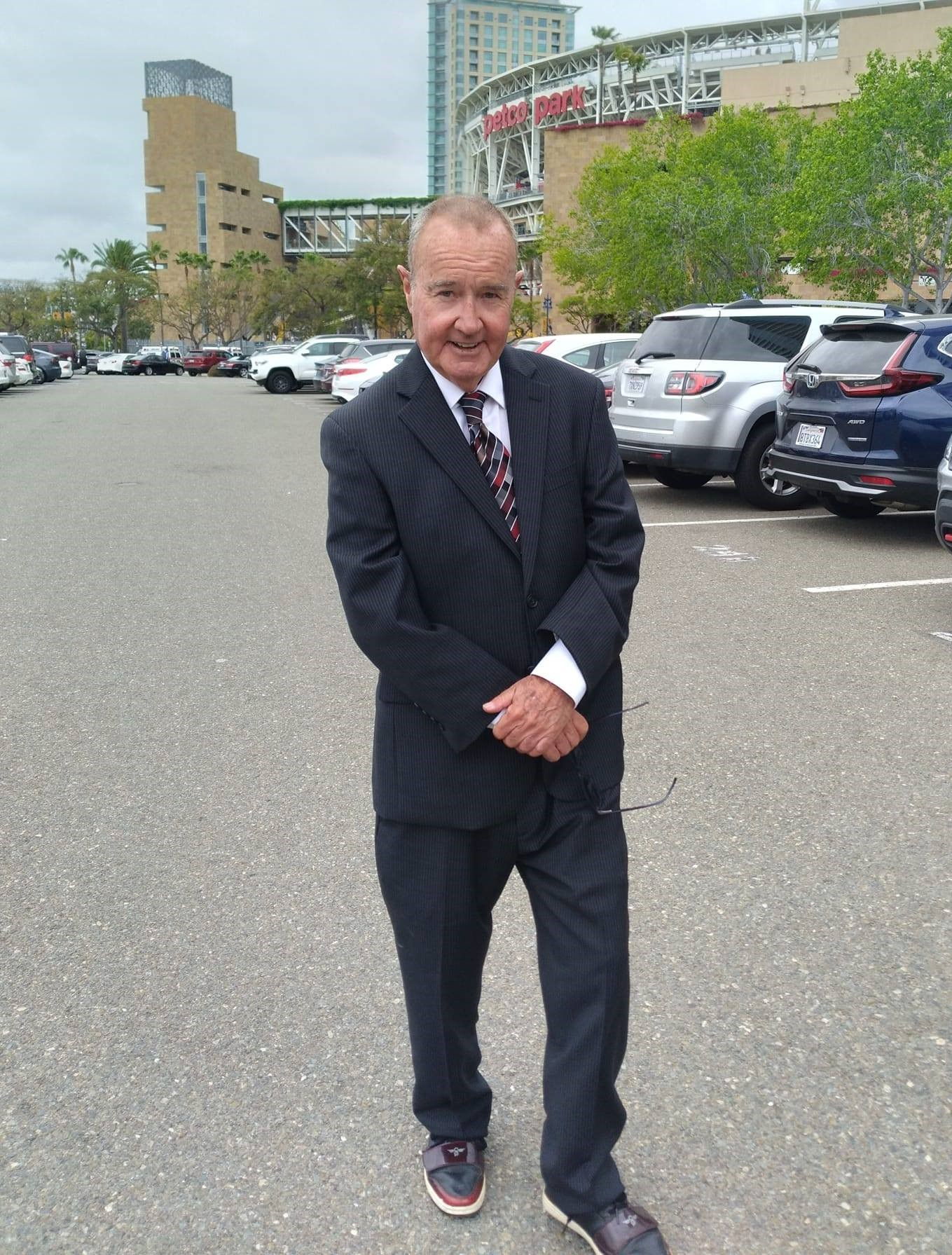
- Robbins in 2021
- Born: Louis Nanasi; August 10, 1956; Los Angeles, California, U.S.
- Died: January 18, 2022 (aged 65); Oceanside, California, U.S.
- Education: University of California, San Diego
- Occupations: Actor; real estate broker
- Years active: 1963–1972
- Known for: Voice of Charlie Brown
- Relatives: Ahna Capri (sister)

Peter Robbins (born Louis Nanasi; August 10, 1956 – January 18, 2022) was an American actor and real estate broker. Robbins gained national fame in the 1960s for being the first actor to voice Charlie Brown in the Peanuts animated specials.

== Early life ==
Peter Robbins was born Louis G. Nanasi in Los Angeles, California, on August 10, 1956. He was the child of Hungarian immigrants. Robbins graduated from the University of California, San Diego in 1979. His sister was the actress Ahna Capri (Anna Marie Nanasi).

== Career ==
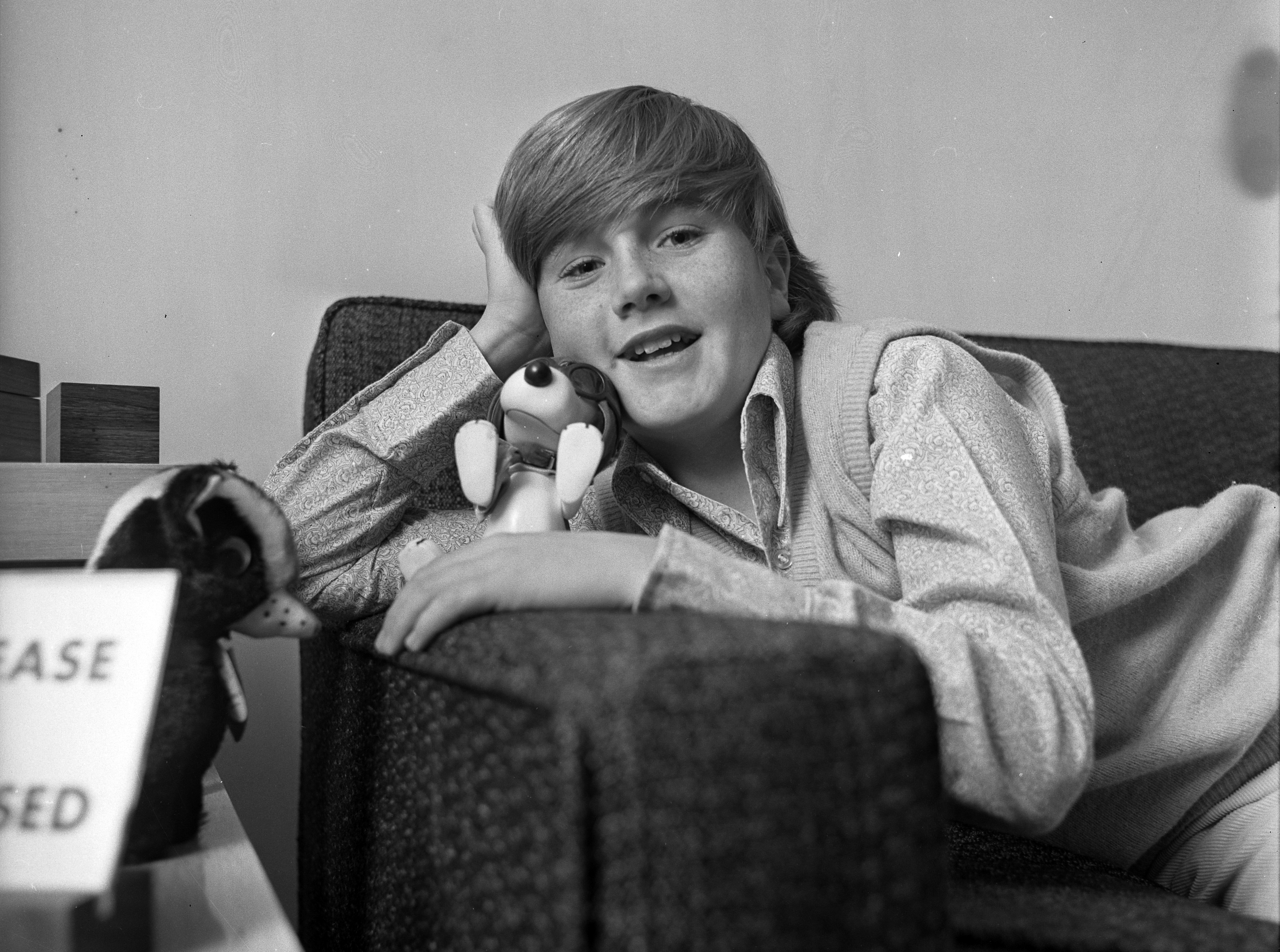
Robbins in 1971

Robbins first began acting in various films and television shows at the age of seven. As a child, he made a guest appearance as Elmer in the popular series The Munsters. At the age of nine, Robbins provided the voice of Charlie Brown, whom he considered to be his childhood hero, in one television documentary, six Peanuts television specials and one movie from 1963 to 1969, including the film A Boy Named Charlie Brown and the television specials A Charlie Brown Christmas and It's the Great Pumpkin, Charlie Brown.

At the age of fourteen, Robbins was replaced by younger child actors in the Peanuts specials produced after the 1960s, but his trademark scream of "AAUGH!", first used in A Boy Named Charlie Brown (1969), continued to be used in specials for Charlie Brown and other Peanuts characters.

Robbins appeared in an episode of F Troop in 1966 entitled "The Sergeant and the Kid" and appeared in an episode of Get Smart as the mysterious Dr. T. He also appeared in the Sonny & Cher film Good Times.

Robbins retired from acting in 1972 and pursued a career in real estate, with brief stints in radio. In 1996, he hosted a talk radio show in Palm Springs, California, at KPSL 1010 Talk Radio. By 2006, according to a broadcast by National Public Radio, he was managing real estate in Van Nuys.

== Legal and health issues ==
On January 20, 2013, Robbins was arrested by San Diego County Sheriff's Department deputies at Homeland Security's Port of Entry in San Ysidro, California, while re-entering the United States, and charged with "four felony counts of making a threat to cause death or great bodily injury and one felony count of stalking." The four counts involved four victims, including a San Diego Police sergeant, whom Robbins reportedly threatened with bodily harm on January 13, 2013. He was held on $550,000 bond. On May 8, 2013, Robbins was sentenced to a year in jail for threatening his former girlfriend and stalking her plastic surgeon, but was allowed to log time in treatment instead. After release, he was sent to a residential drug treatment center.

In 2015, Robbins was arrested for multiple probation violations, including drinking alcohol and failing to complete mandatory domestic violence classes. On June 5, 2015, he was ordered to undergo a mental health exam after an outburst during a court proceeding in San Diego. On December 7, 2015, Robbins was sentenced to four years and eight months in prison as part of a plea agreement for sending threatening letters to the manager (and the manager's wife) of the mobile home park in which he lived in Oceanside.

Robbins had a lifelong battle with mental illness; having stated at previous hearings that he had bipolar disorder and paranoid schizophrenia. Robbins was incarcerated at the California Institution for Men in Chino and was transferred to the Atascadero State Hospital because of his mental state. He was released on parole in October 2019 after serving 80 percent of his sentence, on the conditions that he did not drink alcohol or take any illegal drugs.

He remained attached to Charlie Brown as an adult and even had a tattoo of Charlie Brown and Snoopy on his arm. By 2020, after finally receiving the correct medication for his lifetime bipolar disorder, Robbins was back, signing autographs of the Charlie Brown Christmas book in public appearances at Comic-Con conventions across the United States.

He explained the path that led to his recovery in an October 2019 television interview with Fox 5 San Diego reporter Phil Blauer. Robbins also discussed his plans to write an autobiography titled Confessions of a Blockhead, detailing his life, his jail experiences, and his future. He was unable to finish the book before his death.

=== Death ===
Robbins died by suicide on January 18, 2022, at age 65. His death was announced the following week on January 25, 2022.

== Filmography ==
=== Film ===
Year	Title	Role	Notes
1963	A Ticklish Affair	Grover Martin	
1966	And Now Miguel	Pedro	
1966	Moment to Moment	Timmy Stanton	
1967	Good Times	Brandon	
1969	A Boy Named Charlie Brown	Charlie Brown	Voice
1970	The Boatniks	Boy on Boat	Uncredited

=== Television ===
Year	Title	Role	Notes
1963	A Boy Named Charlie Brown	Charlie Brown (voice)	Television Documentary
1964	Rawhide	Mike	Episode: "Incident of the Pied Piper"
1964	The Donna Reed Show	Peewee	Episode: "Teamwork"
1964	Vacation Playhouse	Richard	Episode: "Hey Teacher"
1964	The Munsters	Elmer	Episode: "Rock-a-Bye Munster"
1964	The Farmer's Daughter	Josh	Episode: "Sorak for Yourself John Katy"
1964	The Joey Bishop Show	Other Child, Peter	2 episodes
1965	A Charlie Brown Christmas	Charlie Brown (voice)	Television special
1966	Charlie Brown's All Stars!	Charlie Brown (voice)	Television special
1966	Love on a Rooftop	Ronnie	Episode: "The Chocolate Hen"
1966	It's the Great Pumpkin, Charlie Brown	Charlie Brown (voice)	Television film
1966	ABC Stage 67	Herbert	Episode: "Noon Wine"
1967	The F.B.I.	Jobie	Episode: "The Raid"
1967	F Troop	Joey Walker	Episode: "The Sergeant and the Kid"
1967	You're in Love, Charlie Brown	Charlie Brown (voice)	Television special
1967	Get Smart	Dr. Tattledove	Episode: "The Mysterious Dr. T"
1968	He's Your Dog, Charlie Brown	Charlie Brown (voice)	Television special
1968–1969	Blondie	Alexander Bumstead	16 episodes
1969	It Was a Short Summer, Charlie Brown	Charlie Brown (voice)	Television special
1970	Bracken's World	David	Episode: "Nude Scene"
1971	Dinah's Place	Himself	
1972	My Three Sons	Jeffrey Fredericks	Episode: "The Birth of Arfie"
1985	It's Your 20th Television Anniversary, Charlie Brown	Himself	Documentary
1990	You Don't Look 40, Charlie Brown	Himself	Documentary
2001	The Making of "A Charlie Brown Christmas"	Himself	Documentary
2005	The Tonight Show with Jay Leno	Himself	1 episode
2005	TV Land's Top Ten	Himself	1 episode
2021	Abq Comic-Con! Documentary	Himself	Documentary; final role

== Awards ==
Awards and nominations
Year	Award	Category	Title	Result
1971	Grammy Awards	Best Recording for Children	A Boy Named Charlie Brown	Nominated
1978	Grammy Awards	Best Recording for Children	A Charlie Brown Christmas	Nominated
1979	Grammy Awards	Best Recording for Children	Charlie Brown's All Stars!	Nominated
1980	Grammy Awards	Best Recording for Children	You're in Love, Charlie Brown	Nominated
