= It's the Great Pumpkin, Charlie Brown =

1966 animated Halloween television special

- Genre: Animated television special
- Based on: Peanuts by Charles M. Schulz
- Written by: Charles M. Schulz
- Directed by: Bill Melendez
- Voices of: Peter Robbins; Chris Shea; Sally Dryer; Kathy Steinberg
- Music by: Vince Guaraldi
- Opening theme: "Linus and Lucy"
- Ending theme: "Charlie Brown Theme"
- Country of origin: United States
- Original language: English

Production
- Executive producer: Lee Mendelson
- Producers: Lee Mendelson; Bill Melendez
- Cinematography: Nick Vasu
- Editors: Robert T. Gillis; Steven Melendez
- Running time: 25 minutes
- Production companies: Lee Mendelson Productions; Bill Melendez Productions; United Feature Syndicate

Original release
- Network: CBS
- Release: October 27, 1966

Related
- Charlie Brown's All Stars! (1966); You're in Love, Charlie Brown (1967)

It's the Great Pumpkin, Charlie Brown is a 1966 American animated Halloween television special based on the comic strip Peanuts by Charles M. Schulz. The third Peanuts special, and the second holiday-themed special to be created, it was written by Schulz along with director/animator Bill Melendez and producer Lee Mendelson. The cast included Peter Robbins as Charlie Brown, Christopher Shea as Linus Van Pelt, Sally Dryer as Lucy Van Pelt, and Melendez as Snoopy. The special features music composed by jazz pianist Vince Guaraldi whose contributions include the theme song "Linus and Lucy." It aired on broadcast television most years from its debut in 1966 until 2020, when it became an Apple TV+ exclusive.

It's the Great Pumpkin, Charlie Brown follows the children of the Peanuts comics as they celebrate Halloween, while Linus forgoes celebrations to wait in a pumpkin patch for the mythical Great Pumpkin. The sequence following Snoopy as a World War I flying ace and its depiction of Lucy pulling a football away from Charlie Brown have both become widely recognized in pop culture. The program was highly successful, watched by 49% of American television viewers in its debut broadcast. It received widespread critical acclaim, particularly for its artistic style and music score, and it is often regarded as the best of the Peanuts television specials. The success of It's the Great Pumpkin, Charlie Brown led to the development of the Halloween special as a television genre.

== Plot ==
As Halloween nears, Lucy and Linus pick out a large pumpkin from a pumpkin patch near their house to create a jack-o'-lantern. Linus is dismayed when Lucy begins carving the pumpkin, upset that she "killed it". Later, Lucy tricks Charlie Brown into kicking a football, which she pulls away at the last second, causing Charlie to fall. Linus writes and sends off a letter addressed to the Great Pumpkin, to the ridicule of his peers, especially Lucy. Linus believes the Great Pumpkin is similar to Santa Claus by also delivering presents to children. Sally Brown, driven by her crush on Linus, is the only one who accepts Linus's belief. Charlie Brown proudly announces he has been invited to Violet's Halloween party, to Lucy's disbelief.

On Halloween night, the Peanuts gang prepare their costumes for trick-or-treating. As they depart, they make a brief detour to the pumpkin patch and mock Linus, who is holding vigil for the Great Pumpkin instead of trick-or-treating. Sally breaks off from the group to stay with Linus, and he explains that the Great Pumpkin arises in the patch of the most sincere of believers. As the others trick-or-treat, they all receive a plethora of candy and other goodies except Charlie Brown who only gets rocks. Afterward, they head to Violet's Halloween party, where Violet uses Charlie Brown as a model, drawing a jack-o'-lantern design on his bald head.

During this time, Snoopy, dressed as a World War I flying ace, boards his doghouse, imagining it to be a Sopwith Camel fighter plane engaged in a dramatic aerial gunfight with the elusive Red Baron. Snoopy is "shot down" and forced to navigate on foot the treacherous countryside behind enemy lines, ending at the party, where he sneaks into the apple-bobbing tank as Lucy partakes. Snoopy listens as Schroeder plays World War I era tunes on the piano. The music—and Snoopy's mood—alternates between joyful and sorrowful, until Snoopy accidentally howls and leaves in embarrassment.

At the pumpkin patch, Sally grows skeptical until Linus hears a nearby rustling noise and spots a figure in the distance. Convinced it is the Great Pumpkin, he faints in excitement. The figure turns out to be Snoopy, and Sally berates Linus for ruining her night. At 4 a.m., Lucy, knowing Linus is waiting in the pumpkin patch for the Great Pumpkin, goes out to the pumpkin patch to bring in a shivering Linus from the cold and tuck him into bed.

The next day, Charlie Brown and Linus reflect on the night before. Charlie Brown attempts to comfort Linus by saying that he himself has done some stupid things, but a deeply offended Linus rants that the Great Pumpkin is sure to arrive next year, as Charlie Brown listens.

== Voice cast ==
The program's cast includes:

- Peter Robbins as Charlie Brown
- Chris Shea as Linus Van Pelt
- Sally Dryer as Lucy Van Pelt
- Cathy Steinberg as Sally Brown
- Bill Melendez as Snoopy
- Gai DeFaria as "Pig-Pen"
- Glenn Mendelson as Schroeder and Shermy
- Ann Altieri as Violet and Frieda
- Lisa DeFaria as Patty

== Background ==
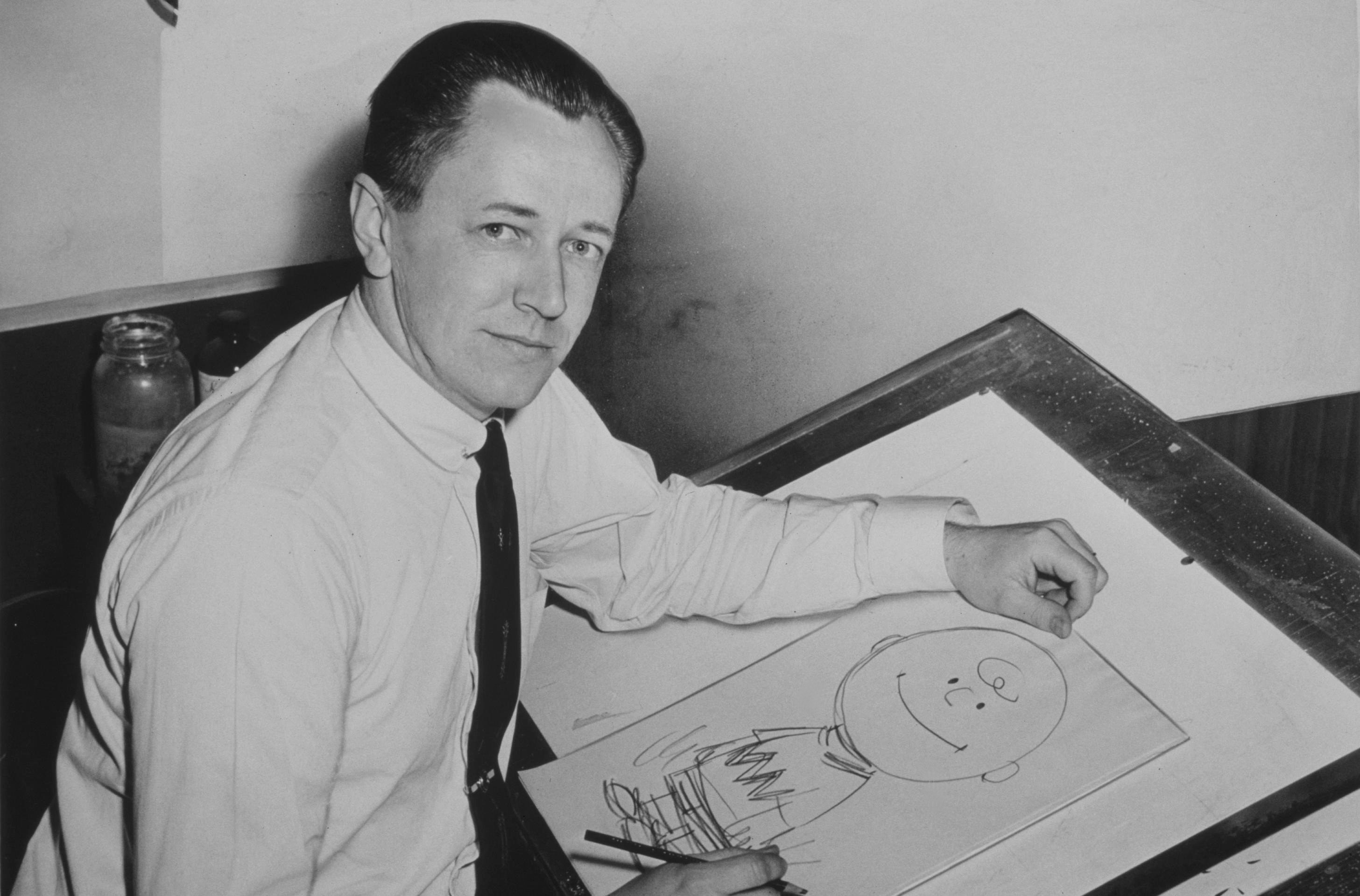
Charles M. Schulz in 1956

The Peanuts comic strip by Charles M. Schulz was first printed in 1950 and became popular within its first years of publication. Schulz first introduced the Great Pumpkin in 1959 by having Linus confuse the traditions of Halloween and Christmas. The Great Pumpkin was introduced through a series of strips published over eight days, which became a major event for the comic strip. A similar story appeared again in 1960, encompassing sixteen comics. Schulz continued to write Great Pumpkin stories in Peanuts each October.

The television special A Charlie Brown Christmas had been written by Schulz and broadcast on CBS in December 1965. The special was highly successful, prompting the network to hire Schulz for two additional television specials. His second special, Charlie Brown's All Stars!, broadcast in the summer of 1966. While it was successful, it was not as renowned as A Charlie Brown Christmas.

== Production ==
The network requested another holiday special after the success of A Charlie Brown Christmas. Its plot was formulated by a team of three: Schulz, director Bill Melendez, and producer Lee Mendelson. The network executive communicating with Mendelson specified that it had to be a "blockbuster", which brought considerable stress to the writers. They also gave the writers more creative freedom while they wrote the third special.

The writers began with disparate scenes from the comic strip to adapt, including Snoopy as a World War I flying ace and Lucy pulling the football away from Charlie Brown. Schulz's co-writers immediately took to the idea when he suggested writing a Halloween special around the Great Pumpkin. The main storyline about Linus and Sally was based on a series of strips from October and November 1962. The writing process went quickly, allowing more time for other aspects of production, such as animation. The decision to adapt Snoopy's flying ace persona from the comic strip came together with the Halloween theme after Schulz realized it resembled a Halloween costume. Schulz suggested the idea of Charlie Brown receiving a rock while trick-or-treating, but Mendelson felt that this was "too cruel". Schulz and Melendez responded by suggesting Charlie Brown should receive three rocks. Mendelson later agreed that it was the right decision after seeing the scene's popularity.

The program was given a production budget of $76,000. The children in the program were voiced by child actors, including both trained child actors and children that lived in Mendelson's neighborhood. Melendez insisted on having child actors in all of the Peanuts specials, and he voiced Snoopy by recording himself saying nonsense words and then speeding it up. Steinberg's lines as Sally Brown were rushed when she developed a loose tooth, fearing that it would cause a lisp. She was taken to the studio to record all of her lines the same night and developed a severe lisp after losing her tooth the following day. Steinberg struggled with the word "restitution" while she was recording, so Mendelson had her pronounce it one syllable at a time and spliced it together afterward.

The animations were drawn by a team of artists led by Melendez. Bill Littlejohn also worked on the program's animation. Unlike previous Peanuts specials, It's the Great Pumpkin, Charlie Brown incorporates frequent movement of the camera. Artist Dean Spille painted the backgrounds of the French countryside during Snoopy's flying ace sequence. He drew from memory as he had previously visited similar areas in Europe, and he was given full creative freedom by Schulz and Melendez. The backgrounds in this sequence used linear perspective rather than a simple flat design. Mendelson later told The Washington Post that the sequence with Snoopy flying his doghouse was "one of the most memorable animated scenes ever." He also described It's the Great Pumpkin, Charlie Brown as Bill Melendez's "animation masterpiece". The program's final runtime was 25 minutes.

== Music score ==
The music score was performed by the Vince Guaraldi Sextet, featuring Guaraldi on piano, Monty Budwig on bass, Colin Bailey on drums, John Gray on guitar, Ronald Lang on woodwinds, and Emmanuel Klein on trumpet. It was orchestrated by John Scott Trotter. Recording took place on October 4, 1966, at Desilu's Gower Street Studio in Hollywood. Guaraldi had been in charge of music in both of the previous Peanuts specials, as well as the unaired 1963 documentary A Boy Named Charlie Brown.

Guaraldi's theme for the special, "The Great Pumpkin Waltz," is first heard when Linus is writing the Great Pumpkin at the beginning and plays throughout. Guaraldi historian Derrick Bang commented that the music Guaraldi composed for the special "emphatically established the Peanuts 'musical personality,' " adding that the version of "Linus and Lucy" featured during the cold open was "arguably the best arrangement…that Guaraldi ever laid down thanks in great part to Ronald Lang's flute counterpoint." This version was again utilized in the 1969 feature film A Boy Named Charlie Brown.

The World War I songs played by Schroeder while Snoopy dances are: "It's a Long Way to Tipperary," "There's a Long, Long Trail," "Pack Up Your Troubles in Your Old Kit-Bag," and "Roses of Picardy."

Craft Recordings released the complete soundtrack album from the special on October 5, 2018, but faced criticism for the inclusion of sound effects. Craft Recordings reissued the soundtrack on August 26, 2022, using newly discovered original master tapes, without sound effects from the television special.

== Release ==
The initial broadcast of It's the Great Pumpkin, Charlie Brown was on CBC Television in Canada on October 26, 1966. It was then broadcast on CBS October 27, 1966, preempting My Three Sons, and tied Bonanza as the No. 1 broadcast in that week's Nielsen TV ratings.The show aired against Star Trek on NBC and The Dating Game on ABC, earning 49% of the total market share with 17.3 million viewers. After its success, CBS rebroadcast the program each year. It moved to ABC in 2001, where it continued to broadcast annually.

It's the Great Pumpkin, Charlie Brown was made available as a home release in 1985. The program was released on DVD by Paramount Pictures on September 12, 2000.

On October 7, 2025, it was released on the DVD and Blu-Ray collection Peanuts: 75th Anniversary Ultimate TV Specials Collection along with 39 other Peanuts specials.

Apple Inc. purchased the broadcast rights to all Peanuts specials in 2018, and they became Apple TV+ exclusives in 2020. This was the first year that It's the Great Pumpkin, Charlie Brown was not broadcast on television since its debut in 1966. A licensing agreement allowed the special to air on PBS in 2021. The agreement was not renewed in 2022, but Apple has made the special free to watch for one weekend each year since then. Apple renewed its exclusive streaming rights through 2030 in an agreement announced October 2, 2025, the 75th anniversary of the first Peanuts comic strip. Non-streaming rights were acquired by Sony Pictures Television along with the rest of the Peanuts library later in 2025.

== Themes ==
Religion and faith feature prominently in the special. Linus's belief in the Great Pumpkin and Charlie Brown's belief in Santa Claus, and their opposition to one another's beliefs, are described as "denominational differences". This theme is lifted directly from the Peanuts comic strip, with the "denominational differences" line appearing in 1963. Though Schulz was religious, he rejected evangelicalism and revealed religion, and he had long opposed the idea of denominational differences splitting religion, believing that no one denomination could be sure of the truth. Throughout the program, Linus maintains faith in the Great Pumpkin while he is criticized by the other children, and he chooses to maintain a vigil in the pumpkin patch at the cost of missing the festivities.

The special plays off of many traditional aspects of Halloween and celebrations associated with the holiday, including pumpkin carving, trick-or-treating, and wearing costumes. Despite this, it does not incorporate elements of horror fiction outside of the title sequence. Comparisons to Christmas are also included, particularly the letter to the Great Pumpkin as opposed to Santa Claus, alluding to the success of the franchise's Christmas special the prior year. Schulz modeled Linus's devotion in part on that of children whose families were too poor to purchase vast amounts of Christmas presents, and the hope that things would be better next year if they maintained faith.

== Reception ==
Snoopy's journey across the French countryside has been praised for its art and animation. The backgrounds were painted rather than drawn, and it is the only scene to use linear perspective.

The special was well received by viewers. The response was so positive that Schulz and the studio began receiving packages of candy in response to Charlie Brown's failure to get any during the program. Critic Lawrence Laurent praised the special in his review for The Washington Post, emphasizing the musical score. Clay Gowran of the Chicago Tribune responded to the program by expressing support for the creation of additional Peanuts specials. Cynthia Lowry of the Associated Press commented on the special's optimism and lauded it for its "charm, adult wit and wisdom". Mary Wood of The Cincinnati Post similarly praised the program as "utterly enchanting". At the 19th Primetime Emmy Awards, the special was nominated for Outstanding Children's Program and for Special Classifications of Individual Achievements. The special has been celebrated for its artistic style, particularly its use of color. The sequence of Snoopy crossing the French countryside has received extensive praise, including from other animators and artists such as Jeff Pidgeon and Paul Felix. It's the Great Pumpkin, Charlie Brown is often described as the best of the Peanuts specials.

== Legacy ==
It's the Great Pumpkin, Charlie Brown defined a new genre, as it was the first major Halloween special to broadcast on television. The special's enduring popularity helped to define Halloween for the Baby Boomer generation and contributed to the spread of Halloween as a widely celebrated holiday. Its viewing has since been established as a common Halloween tradition, and its 2003 rebroadcast was the most successful holiday special of the 2000s with 13.2 million viewers.

Two scenes adapting common elements of the comic strip—Snoopy as a WWI flying ace and Charlie Brown attempting to kick the football—were popularized by this special and became commonly recognized imagery. The sequence of Snoopy as a flying ace, which featured no other characters and took up approximately one quarter of the program's runtime, popularized Snoopy as a character independently of the others. Schulz replicated It's the Great Pumpkin, Charlie Brown when he portrayed Linus's devotion to the Easter Beagle in the 1974 special It's the Easter Beagle, Charlie Brown. In this case, Schulz was careful to avoid religious overtones, having Snoopy be the Easter Beagle. The Great Pumpkin has also been referenced in later Peanuts specials, including You're Not Elected, Charlie Brown.
