= Charlie Brown's All Stars! =

1966 Peanuts animated television special

- Genre: Animated; Television special
- Based on: Peanuts by Charles M. Schulz
- Written by: Charles M. Schulz
- Directed by: Bill Melendez
- Voices of: Peter Robbins; Sally Dryer; Christopher Shea; Ann Altieri; Glenn Mendelson; Kathy Steinberg; Geoffrey Ornstein; Lynn Vanderlip; Karen Mendelson; Gail DeFaria; Bill Melendez
- Music by: Vince Guaraldi
- Opening theme: "Charlie Brown and His All-Stars"
- Ending theme: "Oh, Good Grief"
- Country of origin: United States

Production
- Executive producer: Lee Mendelson
- Producer: Bill Melendez
- Editors: Robert T. Gillis; Steven Melendez
- Camera setup: Nick Vasu
- Running time: 25 minutes
- Production companies: Lee Mendelson Film Productions; Bill Melendez Productions

Original release
- Network: CBS
- Release: June 8, 1966

Related
- A Charlie Brown Christmas (1965); It's the Great Pumpkin, Charlie Brown (1966)

Charlie Brown's All Stars! is a 1966 American animated television special based upon the comic strip Peanuts, by Charles M. Schulz. It was the second prime-time TV special (following A Charlie Brown Christmas) to be produced by Lee Mendelson and Bill Melendez (who also directed), and originally aired on CBS on June 8, 1966, with annual re-airings on CBS through 1971.

== Plot ==
After Charlie Brown's baseball team loses its first game of the season, all of his players quit. After the players on his team agree to only rejoin if he is able to get some uniforms, Charlie Brown and his friend Linus start searching for a sponsor. Mr. Hennessy, the operator of the local hardware store, is willing to sponsor the team with new uniforms and offers to put them in an organized league. The excitement gets the better of Charlie Brown, and he eagerly tells the team the good news. However, Mr. Hennessy later informs Charlie Brown that the league allows neither girls nor dogs to play baseball. Unwilling to exclude the girls and Snoopy, Charlie Brown reluctantly declines Mr. Hennessey's offer.

Linus tells Charlie Brown his teammates will not like the news, which gives Charlie Brown an idea: he won't tell them until after the next game, hoping their lifted spirits will help them win. Despite Linus' warning, Charlie Brown goes through with it, and the team starts the game well.

By the 9th inning, Charlie Brown's team is behind by one run. Feeling overconfident, Charlie Brown attempts to steal home, but he fails to do so, causing his team to lose the game. Lucy and the others, furious, claim they would quit were it not for the league deal, Charlie Brown reluctantly reveals that he severed the contract, although he avoids explaining why. After his team storms off, Linus reveals why Charlie Brown declined the offer, prompting Snoopy to break down in tears, and Schroeder to chew out the girls for quitting on Charlie Brown, stating the team treats him badly despite his willingness to sacrifice his dignity for them. The girls, now filled with regret, agree and decide to make it up to Charlie Brown by making him his own uniform out of Linus' security blanket.

The special ends with Charlie Brown in the rain, waiting for people to arrive so they can start another game, just for Linus to be the only one to show up because the manager uniform was his security blanket.

== Cast ==
- Peter Robbins as Charlie Brown
- Christopher Shea as Linus van Pelt
- Sally Dryer as Lucy van Pelt
- Cathy Steinberg as Sally Brown
- Bill Melendez as Snoopy
- Ann Altieri as Frieda
- Glenn Mendelson as Schroeder
- Geoffrey Ornstein as Pig-Pen
- Lynn Vanderlip as Patty
- Gail DeFaria as Shermy
- Karen Mendelson as Violet

== Music score ==
The music for Charlie Brown's All Stars! was performed by the Vince Guaraldi Sextet, featuring Guaraldi on piano, Eugene “Puzzy” Firth on bass, Frank Snow and John Coppola on trumpets, Eddie Duran on guitar, and Lee Charlton on drums. Recording took place on May 13, 1966 at The Sound Recorders in San Francisco, California.

This was the only other 1960's Peanuts special besides A Charlie Brown Christmas to not be orchestrated by John Scott Trotter, who was brought on to assist with future Peanuts specials starting with It's the Great Pumpkin, Charlie Brown. Guaraldi had previously been in charge of music for A Charlie Brown Christmas, as well as the unaired 1963 documentary A Boy Named Charlie Brown.

No official soundtrack for Charlie Brown's All Stars! was released during its original run, though select music cues have appeared on compilation albums. "Air Music" was later issued as "Surfin' Snoopy" on Charlie Brown's Holiday Hits (1998), and was also repurposed in later broadcasts of A Charlie Brown Christmas during Snoopy’s doghouse decorating scene. A variation of "Rain, Rain, Go Away" appeared on Oh Good Grief! (1968).

A remastered soundtrack album featuring original recordings and several bonus tracks was released for the first time on March 20, 2026, pairing It's Arbor Day, Charlie Brown and Charlie Brown's All Stars! in a two-in-one collection.

== Book vs. television special ==
A book about the television special was published shortly after it initially aired. In the book, Charlie Brown tells his teammates "we don't need them," then turns and walks away as they verbally abuse him until Linus defends him, in this instance without giving a reason. In the book, Schroeder is not shown berating the girls and Snoopy along with Linus, although he does in the television show: "Those uniforms meant just as much to Charlie Brown as they did to you. Probably more!" At the end, Linus just comes up to Charlie wearing the new uniform on the pitchers mound and Charlie wordlessly lets him use his shirt tail to hold up against his cheek.

== Home media ==
The special was first released on RCA's SelectaVision CED format in 1983 as part of the "A Charlie Brown Festival Vol. IV" compilation. It was also released on VHS and Betamax by Media Home Entertainment in 1984, along with It's Magic, Charlie Brown. It would be released again by its kids subdivision Hi-Tops Video in 1988. Paramount Home Media Distribution released it on VHS on January 9, 1996, along with It's Spring Training, Charlie Brown. Charlie Brown's All Stars! was released in DVD format on March 2, 2004, grouped with the similarly themed It's Spring Training, Charlie Brown (1992) and Lucy Must Be Traded, Charlie Brown (2003). On July 7, 2009, it was released in remastered form as part of the DVD box set, Peanuts 1960's Collection. It was again released as part of the 4K edition of It's the Great Pumpkin, Charlie Brown in 2017.

On October 7, 2025, it was released on the DVD and Blu-Ray collection Peanuts: 75th Anniversary Ultimate TV Specials Collection along with 39 other Peanuts specials.

== Canceled video game adaptation ==
A canceled video game titled Charlie Brown's All Stars for the PlayStation 2 and PlayStation Portable was likely going to be an adaptation of the special. It was developed simultaneously with Snoopy vs. the Red Baron by FarSight Studios and was going to be published by Namco Bandai Games. It was going to release in the spring of 2007; however, it was canceled because of an excessive number of projects by the studio and lack of staff.

== Production notes ==
- The scene where Snoopy is surfing is later reanimated in Snoopy Come Home, which in turn was later re-used in You're a Good Man, Charlie Brown, and Snoopy's Reunion.
- Like A Charlie Brown Christmas and It's the Great Pumpkin, Charlie Brown before it, this special also had sponsoring from Coca-Cola (and Dolly Madison on a repeat after 1966), which was later edited out from later broadcasts and video/DVD releases.
- The original music cue "Surfin' Snoopy" was later used in a re-broadcast of "A Charlie Brown Christmas".
- This is the first non-holiday-oriented Peanuts special.
- Even though Linus knows why Charlie Brown didn't get the uniforms, he can be seen getting mad and yelling at Charlie Brown with the others. He then explains to them why Charlie Brown turned down the offer.
- This special was originally announced as Good Grief, Charlie Brown and was advertised as such in The New York Times.
- The special's premiere was pre-empted in the Topeka, Kansas television market due to WIBW-TV's coverage of the F5 tornado that struck Topeka that evening.

== Reception ==
The special was nominated for a Primetime Emmy Award for Outstanding Children's Program in 1967, along with It's the Great Pumpkin, Charlie Brown. It lost to Hanna-Barbera's Jack and the Beanstalk, starring Gene Kelly.
