= Violet (Peanuts) =

Peanuts comic strip character

Violet Gray
- Peanuts character
- First appearance: February 7, 1951; A Charlie Brown Christmas (television special); A Boy Named Charlie Brown (film)
- Last appearance: November 12, 1996 (comic strip; original); November 25, 1997 (comic strip; reprint)
- Voiced by: Sally Dryer (1963, 1965); Karen Mendelson (1966); Ann Altieri (1966-1969); Linda Ercoli (1972, 1975); Roseline Rubens (1980); Stacy Ferguson (1985); Deanna Tello (1992); Ashley Edner (2000); Kaitlyn Maggio (2003); Jolean Wejbe (2006); Taya Calicetto (2008-2009); Blesst Bowden (2011); Madisyn Shipman (2015); Charlie Boyle (2021-present)

In-universe information
- Gender: Female

Violet Gray is a fictional character featured in the long-running syndicated daily and Sunday comic strip Peanuts, created by Charles M. Schulz. Violet first appeared in the February 7, 1951 strip. She was originally a major character, until she was eventually relegated to background and cameo appearances as other female characters became more prominent, with Lucy ultimately taking over most of Violet's character traits. Violet is a snob who likes bragging and, along with her best friends Lucy and Patty, often teases and torments Charlie Brown; however, she is generally softer in this regard than Lucy. She bullies other characters in the strip, particularly "Pig-Pen".

In addition to the comic strip, Violet has appeared alongside other Peanuts characters in numerous Peanuts television specials, cinematic movies, theatrical plays, and video games.

== History ==
Violet first appeared in the February 7, 1951 Peanuts strip. She became the strip's fifth character: up to that point, Charlie Brown, Shermy, Patty and Snoopy had been the only four characters seen in the then four-month-old strip. From then on, Violet's character changed and developed until the 1960s, when she began to be seen less often than the other major characters, with her appearances eventually reduced to the background and cameos. Her last appearance was in the November 27, 1997 Peanuts strip.

== Appearance ==
As Violet's character developed over the years, her appearance changed as well. In the early strips, Violet has her shoulder-length black hair kept in either pigtails, a bun, or, sometimes, a ponytail. Later on, Schulz dropped the braids and kept Violet's hair only in ponytails. Violet also wears front bangs and often wears dresses which are originally depicted as purple; later they were depicted as lime green, as well as black Mary Janes shoes. Violet wears her purple dress in The Peanuts Movie, which is consistent with her name.

== Personality ==
Violet is smart, popular, tomboyish, and somewhat of a snob. She makes her opinions known to everyone, and her haughtiness causes her to often torment other people, whom she views as beneath her.

Compared to the apparent middle-class upbringing of the other characters, Violet has an upper-class mentality and she likes to brag about how her father possesses something her friends' fathers don't; it is also implied, however, that Violet's father is often absent from her life, which her peers use against her when she gets too obnoxious. For example, in a Father's Day strip, her boasts are quelled by Charlie Brown when he takes her to his dad's barbershop. After telling her about how his dad would always smile at him no matter how bad a workday he was having, a moved and humbled Violet walked away, but not before quietly wishing Charlie Brown a Happy Father's Day. In another example, a character named "5" fired back at her with "My dad goes to PTA meetings!" Charlie Brown once deflated her with the comeback: "My dad has a son."

In the early strips, Violet often acted like a preschool-age Suzy Homemaker: frequently making mud pies, playing "house," and being linked to romantic scenarios involving Shermy or Charlie Brown. In a strip from 1954, she is shown to collect stamps as a hobby. On some occasions, Violet was shown walking and keeping company with Lucy.

Her surname (Gray) was mentioned only once, on April 4, 1953.

Violet's personality was much more forceful and recognizable compared to the more generic early Peanuts characters like Patty and Shermy, which allowed her to survive slightly longer than those founding characters when a new wave of characters, Linus, Lucy, and Schroeder, were introduced (as an example, Violet has key roles in the TV specials A Charlie Brown Christmas and It's the Great Pumpkin, Charlie Brown). By the 1960s, however, Violet, too, was largely phased out with the introduction of the next wave of characters (Peppermint Patty, Marcie, Franklin and such). Schulz admitted in a 1988 interview that Violet's pure vindictiveness had made it difficult to give her punch lines. Speaking of her, Patty and Shermy: "Some characters just don't seem to have enough personality to carry out ideas. They're just almost born straight men." Schulz also contrasted Violet to Lucy in that where Violet was purely mean, Lucy had redeeming characteristics of being bluntly honest and to-the-point, and thus Lucy "worked" as a more rounded character where Violet did not. Violet's use in the strip was eventually reduced to appearances in the background.

== Voiced by ==
- Sally Dryer (1963, 1965)
- Karen Mendelson (1966)
- Ann Altieri (1966–1969)
- Linda Ercoli (1972, 1975)
- Roseline Rubens (1980)
- Stacy Ferguson (1985)
- Deanna Tello (1992)
- Ashley Edner (2000)
- Kaitlyn Maggio (2003)
- Jolean Wejbe (2006)
- Taya Calicetto (2008–2009)
- Blesst Bowden (2011)
- Madisyn Shipman (2015)
- Charlie Boyle (2021–present)
- Hattie Kragten (2021)
