= Schroeder (Peanuts) =

Peanuts comic strip character

- Peanuts character
- Schroeder playing his toy piano
- First appearance: May 30, 1951
- Last appearance: September 12, 1999 (comic strip)
- Created by: Charles M. Schulz
- Voiced by: Various voice actors See below

In-universe information
- Gender: Male
- Nationality: USA

Schroeder is a fictional character in the long-running comic strip Peanuts, created by Charles M. Schulz. He is distinguished by his prodigious skill at playing the toy piano, as well as by his love of classical music in general and the composer Ludwig van Beethoven in particular. He is also the object of the unrequited infatuation of Lucy Van Pelt, who constantly leans on Schroeder's piano. His first name is unknown.

In 2009, in honor of Schroeder's passion for Beethoven, the Charles M. Schulz Museum (Santa Rosa) and the Ira F. Brilliant Center for Beethoven Studies announced the launching of a permanent online exhibit of 60 of the 300 Schulz cartoons that involve Schroeder and Beethoven.

== Character profile ==
Schroeder has short, yellow hair and almost always wears a purple or blue striped shirt, black shorts, and brown Oxford shoes.

Despite playing only a toy piano, Schroeder is a very talented musician who is obsessed with the music of Ludwig van Beethoven, to the point where he almost never expands his musical portfolio beyond Beethoven's work. Since he is Schroeder's "hero", he wants to be like Beethoven. As Beethoven was a lifelong bachelor, Schroeder thinks he should be the same, one reason he rejects Lucy's love interest in him. The closest Schroeder got to playing a real piano was playing his toy piano on the seat of one. Schroeder's admiration is so great that he often dismisses Christmas in favor of December 17, Beethoven's purported birthday (actually the day of his baptism).

By far Schroeder's most significant relationship in the strip is with Lucy Van Pelt, who has a crush on him because she sees his artistic inclination as romantic. This makes Schroeder one of the few people Lucy never dislikes, and she often fantasizes about marrying him. Lucy most often expresses her affection by leaning back on his piano and trying to engage him in conversation while he plays. Knowing Lucy well, Schroeder does not fall for this and resists her romantic overtures. But he comes to enjoy her attention and will participate in conversation, though she often offends him. Charlie Brown, Frieda, Peppermint Patty, and Snoopy are also occasionally depicted leaning on Schroeder's piano. Snoopy sometimes dances on it.

While not one of his closer friends, Schroeder is generally on good terms with Charlie Brown. He usually does not stoop to the level of the other kids, but he is not above it. Perhaps the most significant instance of his standing up for Charlie Brown is when he angrily berates Violet Gray for giving Charlie Brown a used valentine a full month after Valentine's Day, saying he had feelings and deserved better, only for Charlie Brown to eagerly accept it. Schroeder is also the catcher on Charlie Brown's baseball team, though he is usually seen walking back to the pitcher's mound with the baseball, never throwing it—admitting in one strip he did not want the other team to discover his lack of ability. He also is one of the few players who has any respect for Charlie Brown as a manager; he is as capable of ire at Charlie Brown's poor performance as anyone, but such instances are rare.

== History ==
Schroeder was introduced as a baby on May 30, 1951, but he aged up to the maturity level of the other characters over the next three years. In his initial appearance, Patty refers to him as a next-door neighbor. His address is 1770 James Street, easy to remember for him because the number is Beethoven's birth year. In 1953, Schroeder's birthday was revealed to be January 18. Schulz had the idea to incorporate his daughter Meredith's toy piano into the strip, and decided to give it to the newest character. The origin of his name can be found in Schulz's 1975 book Peanuts Jubilee: "Schroeder was named after a young boy with whom I used to caddy at Highland Park golf course in St. Paul, Minnesota. I don't recall ever knowing his first name, but just 'Schroeder' seemed right for the character in the script, even before he became the great musician he now is."

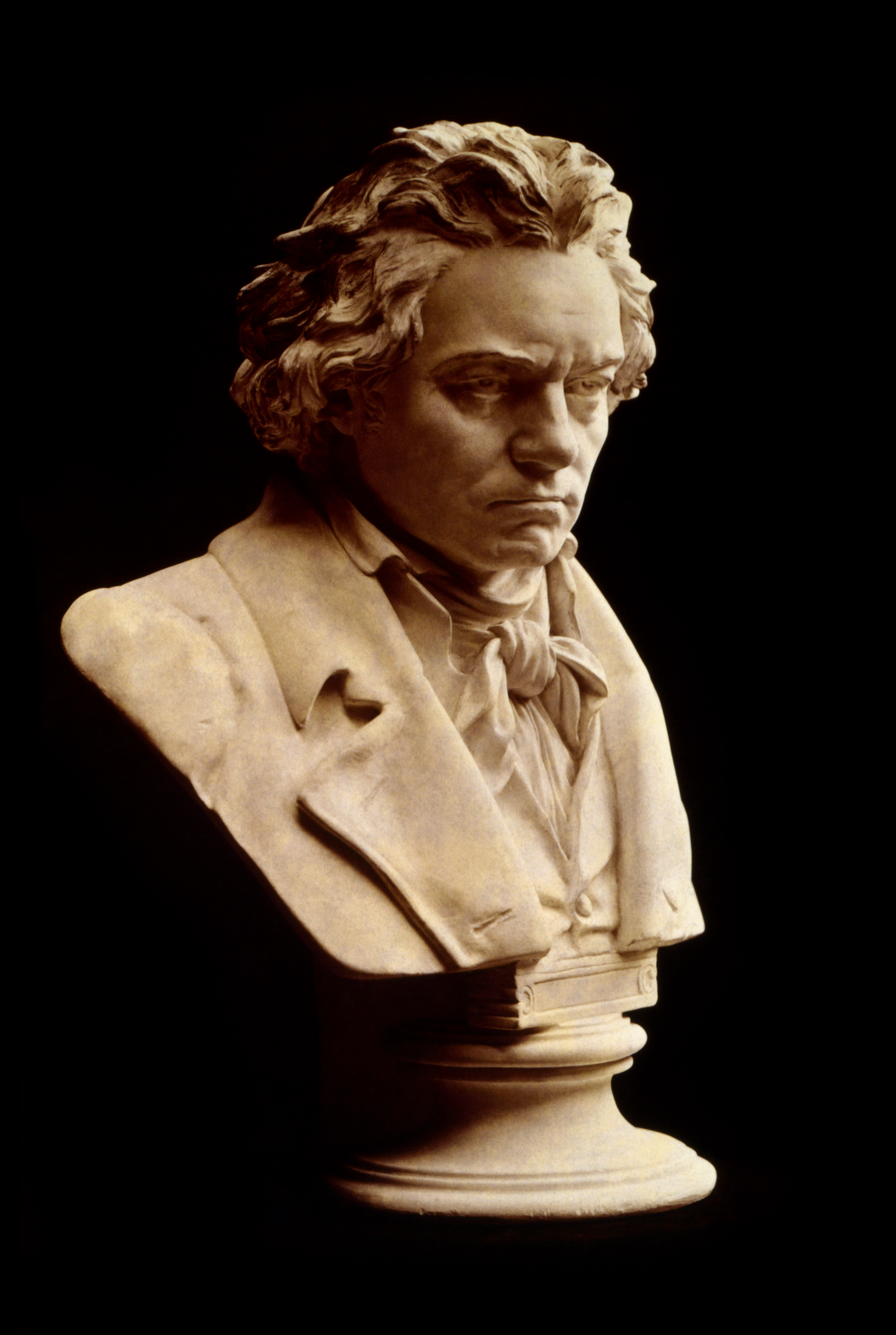
A bust of Beethoven

From his first appearance at the piano on September 24, 1951, Schroeder has played classical pieces at a virtuoso level, as depicted by Schulz's transcription of sheet music onto the panel (a process he called "extremely tedious"). The first piece Schroeder played was Rachmaninoff's Prelude in G minor. Schroeder often played music by Beethoven, his favorite composer, though in earlier strips, he also listened to and played other composers' pieces, particularly Brahms. Schulz once said that Brahms was his own favorite composer and originally planned to depict him as Schroeder's idol, but decided that Beethoven sounded "funnier". Every year, Schroeder marks December 16, his hero's birthday, though on at least two occasions Schroeder unintentionally forgot. When Charlie Brown's baseball team is required to have a sponsor to play games, Schroeder's sponsor is Beethoven.

Schroeder became such a devotee of Beethoven that, after Lucy smashed his bust of Beethoven, he wordlessly got another one from a closetful of Beethoven busts; it was later revealed that he also had an entire closetful of pianos. Lucy once implies that his idolization of Beethoven is excessive, and asks what he thinks of other classical composers such as Schubert, Brahms, Bach, and Chopin. Schroeder replies, "They were great too", and continues to play Beethoven. On another occasion, Lucy tells Schroeder, "Beethoven wasn't so great." Irritated, Schroeder asks Lucy to explain her comment. Lucy replies, "You've never seen his face on a bubblegum card, have you?" In an early strip, Schroeder finds he has perfect pitch.

Schroeder is usually depicted sitting at his toy piano, able to pound out multi-octave selections of music, despite the fact that such pianos have a very small range (for instance, and as a running joke, the black keys are merely painted onto the white keys). Charlie Brown tried to get him to play a real piano and young Schroeder burst into tears, intimidated by its size.

== Relationships ==
=== With Lucy Van Pelt ===
Schroeder's other distinguishing mark as a character is his constant refusal of Lucy's love. Lucy is infatuated with Schroeder, and frequently lounges against his piano while he is playing, usually flirting with him or professing her love. But Beethoven was a lifelong bachelor, and Schroeder feels he must emulate every aspect of his idol's life.

In a story arc where she and her family have temporarily moved out of town (also seen in the TV special Is This Goodbye, Charlie Brown?), Schroeder becomes frustrated with his music and mutters, disbelievingly, that he misses her, realizing that, despite his animosity toward her, Lucy has unwittingly become his muse and he cannot play without her (he parodies Henry Higgins by saying "Don't tell me I've grown accustomed to that face!"). Sometimes he gets so annoyed with Lucy that he yanks the piano out from underneath her to get her away from him; on one occasion both Lucy and Frieda lounge on Schroeder's piano until he yanks it from beneath them both after Frieda mistakenly thinks Beethoven is a beverage (she says, "All right, but I'll just have a small glass"). He does allow Charlie Brown to lounge against the piano, because of their solid friendship.

Lucy regularly vexes and perplexes Schroeder with speculations about what their lives would be like if they were married. On one occasion, she rattles off a list of all the luxuries she would need in order to maintain a high-society lifestyle before asking Schroeder whether pianists make much money; when he replies that it depends on how much they practice, she encourages him to keep practicing. Her suggestions that he might insist on playing in cheap bars or that she would make him practice in the basement upset him, and several of her fantasies of their married life seem strangely pessimistic: Lucy has imagined that Schroeder could become a famous concert pianist who breaks both arms skiing, leaving them so destitute that she has to take in laundry to support them; on another occasion she remarked that, if they married and Schroeder failed to earn money, they would sell his piano to buy saucepans. On both occasions, Schroeder got up and walked away from his piano in bewilderment.

Schroeder once took Lucy's place in the psychiatric booth when she was unavailable. When Charlie Brown poured out his troubles, Schroeder said simply, "Go home and listen to a Brahms piano quartet. Five cents, please!" Later, Charlie Brown asked Lucy, "Just how carefully do you screen these assistants of yours?" On another occasion, Schroeder appeared as a patient. He told Lucy about how Beethoven wrote his great Ninth Symphony, but as he was deaf, he never got to hear it, and every time he thinks about it, it makes him sad. Lucy simply replies with "Try not to think about it. Five cents, please!" After he leaves, she remarks, "Some cases are relatively simple."

Schroeder accepted gifts from Lucy on a few occasions. Once, when she gave him a sketch of Beethoven that she drew herself, he was thrilled, but she was then shocked to find he already had a gigantic wall-sized portrait of Beethoven in an elaborate frame hanging in his room. Another time, on Beethoven's birthday, she gave him a picture of Johann Strauss because "they were all out of Beethoven". Schroeder also accepted a flower from Lucy, but after he explained that accepting a flower can mean love, or "just to keep from hurting the other person's feelings", Lucy promptly yanked it back and kicked it away.

In reaction to Lucy's constant advances, Schroeder has occasionally humored her. He gave her a valentine after confirming that he did not have to love her to give her one and that just "barely being able to tolerate her" was fine. Schroeder demonstrates the same fondly teasing tone in the December 14, 1975 Sunday strip, whispering flirtatious comments to her while she pretends to be asleep on his piano. He addresses her as "pretty girl", and says "I think you're kind of cute! You really fascinate me!" He ends his string of flirtatious remarks with "I guess I love everything about you... Sweet baby!" Lucy cannot help but grin, to which Schroeder exclaims, "Ha! I knew you weren't asleep!" Lucy responds with "Rats!"

Schroeder has been known to kiss Lucy only once. Lucy gives Schroeder a cupcake on Beethoven's birthday, and he kisses her on the cheek, but when Lucy turns around she sees Snoopy immediately next to her. Thinking that Snoopy kissed her, she runs away screaming, while Schroeder calls for her to come back. Schroeder once offered to kiss Lucy during a baseball game if she hit a home run (he was confident that would never happen as Lucy had never hit the ball out of the infield). This gave Lucy incentive, and she managed to hit a home run on her very next at-bat. Schroeder waited for her at home plate, reluctantly prepared to kiss her, but Lucy turned it down, not wanting him to kiss her only because he lost a bet.

According to David Michaelis's biographical book Schulz and Peanuts, Schroeder's contentious relationship with Lucy was based on Schulz's relationship with his first wife.

=== With Charlie Brown ===
Schroeder is second only to Linus as a close friend of Charlie Brown, though in a strip from the mid-1950s they wrangled over whether Beethoven or Davy Crockett was greater. During conferences on the pitcher's mound, the two engage in unusual conversations, mostly about Beethoven and hand signals. Schroeder also often encourages Charlie Brown during games, while the rest of the team says, "Don't let us down by showing up!" In the animated cartoon A Boy Named Charlie Brown, he limits Charlie Brown to only two pitches, a high and low straight ball.

Schroeder's most significant act of friendship came in a strip (also in Be My Valentine, Charlie Brown) in which Violet offers Charlie Brown one of her used valentine cards (since he received none the previous day at his school's Valentine's Day party). Schroeder chastises Violet for disregarding Charlie Brown's feelings and her selfish motive of relieving her guilt but the needy Charlie Brown accepts the card while expressing appreciation for Schroeder's gesture.

Charlie Brown is one of the few people Schroeder allows to lounge against his piano, as he knows that Charlie Brown respects his love of Beethoven. When they were younger, Charlie Brown would read Schroeder the story of Beethoven's life. Charlie Brown introduced Schroeder to the piano. Schroeder also generally does not mind Snoopy lounging against his piano until, moved by the music (particularly Chopin), Snoopy generally ends up intruding on his playing or dancing on top of the piano, to Schroeder's annoyance. In one scene of A Charlie Brown Christmas, Schroeder is playing a particularly jazzy portion of "Linus and Lucy" when Snoopy comes out of nowhere and starts dancing on the piano until Schroeder and Lucy start glaring at him, at which point Snoopy stops and crawls away in embarrassment.

=== With Frieda ===
On a few occasions, Frieda has visited Schroeder, making Lucy jealous. Lucy once physically attacked Frieda (per Snoopy's advice) after she discovered her leaning on his piano. Frieda does not seem to annoy him as much as Lucy, but Schroeder obviously prefers Lucy, possibly because Frieda has no knowledge at all of classical music. Frieda once thought Beethoven was some kind of drink, causing Schroeder to violently pull the piano out from under both her and Lucy.

== Schroeder's piano ==
The piano's prodigious capabilities are illustrated in 1965's A Charlie Brown Christmas. Lucy asks Schroeder if he can play "Jingle Bells". Schroeder first plays it in the style of a conventional grand piano, then manages to generate the warm tones of a Hammond organ. Lucy still does not recognize the tune until the irritated Schroeder plays it in a high register with one finger, in the tones of a normal toy piano, whereupon Lucy shouts "That's it!" with such force Schroeder whirls off his chair. (This is the only time in the history of the television specials that his toy piano actually sounds like a toy piano.)

In 1966's It's the Great Pumpkin, Charlie Brown, Schroeder accommodated Snoopy (as the World War I Flying Ace) by playing a brief medley of World War I songs at Violet's Halloween party; he plays "It's a Long Way to Tipperary", "There's a Long Long Trail A-Winding", "Pack Up Your Troubles in Your Old Kit-Bag", and "Roses of Picardy".

Schroeder is normally a very passive character, content to keep to himself and play his music, but he can be angered quite easily, especially if his music or Beethoven are insulted. In one strip, Lucy points out to him the woefully inadequate range of a toy piano; Schroeder pulls the piano out from under her, causing her to strike her head on the floor. This became a running gag in the strip's later years. In 1971's Play It Again, Charlie Brown, Lucy asks if pianists make a lot of money, and Schroeder flies into a rage: "Who cares about money?! This is art! This is great music I'm playing, and playing great music is an art! Do you hear me? An art! Art! Art! Art! Art! Art!" (the last five words punctuated by slamming his hands against his piano). These instances mark the few occasions when any character has successfully stood up to the notoriously aggressive Lucy.

The musical notes Schroeder plays also seem to have substance; characters are able to touch them as they appear in the air. Snoopy, for example, once decorated a Christmas tree using a handful of them and has on at least one occasion been seen dancing atop the musical staff containing them. He has also occasionally dumped a bucketful of them into the piano in order to change the tune Schroeder is playing. Also, twice while Schroeder was playing and the notes were above him, Lucy's head appeared between the treble and bass staffs, causing him to stop and say, "Don't tell me I've grown accustomed to that face!"

Lucy has often spoken of getting Schroeder to give up his piano, saying that married life has financial hardships and he may have to sell his piano in order to buy her a good set of saucepans. On two occasions, Lucy went so far as to destroy Schroeder's piano in an attempt to be rid of the "competition" for his affection, but both attempts failed:

- In a series of strips from January 1969, Lucy threw Schroeder's piano into the dreaded Kite-Eating Tree, which evidently found toy pianos as appetizing as kites. When Charlie Brown asked whether the piano was covered by insurance, Schroeder replied, "How do you explain to the insurance company that your piano was eaten by a tree?"
- In her second attempt to get rid of the piano, from an October 1974 strip series, Lucy threw the piano into the sewer, from which Charlie Brown and Schroeder attempted to retrieve it. Schroeder was able to reach it, but it was stuck, and when it started raining heavily, the piano washed out to sea.

Lucy once "accidentally" washed the piano and threw it in the dryer which, to Schroeder's horror, caused it to shrink.

During the title sequence of The Peanuts Movie, Schroeder plays the 20th Century Fox fanfare on his piano.

== Portrayals ==
- Chris Doran first voiced Schroeder in animation, in 1965's A Charlie Brown Christmas. Various actors since then have portrayed Schroeder including Todd Barbee, who also voiced Charlie Brown from 1973 to 1974.
- The musical You're a Good Man, Charlie Brown featured Skip Hinnant as Schroeder in the 1967 original off-Broadway production, and Stanley Wayne Mathis in the 1999 Broadway revival.
- Schroeder is represented in the play Dog Sees God as a character named "Beethoven."

=== Voiced by ===
- Chris Doran (1963, 1965)
- Glenn Mendelson (1966, 1968)
- John Daschback (1969)
- Andy Pforsich (1969)
- Danny Hjeim (1971)
- David Carey (1972)
- Brian Kazajian (1972)
- Todd Barbee (1974)
- Greg Felton (1975–1977)
- Daniel Anderson (1979)
- Christopher Donohoe (1980–1982)
- Kevin Brando (1983-1984)
- Gary Goren (1984)
- Danny Colby (1985)
- Jeremy Reinbolt (1985)
- Aron Mandelbaum (1986)
- Curtis Andersen (1989)
- Travis Boles (1996)
- Corey Padnos (2000)
- Christopher Ryan Johnson (2002–2003)
- Nick Price (2003)
- Jake D. Smith (2008–2009)
- Trenton Rogers (2011)
- Connor Keddington (2012)
- Noah Johnston (2015)
- Daniel Thornton (2016)
- Aidan Alberto (2018–2019)
- Matthew Mucci (2021–2023)
- Cash Allen-Martin (2024–2026)
- Asher Waxman (2026–present)

== In other media ==
- Schroeder Hall, at The Green Music Center at Sonoma State University, is a recital hall named after the character due to Jeannie and Charles M. Schulz's contributions to the university and ties to the community.
- In The Simpsons episode "Treehouse of Horror IV", the final story ends in a parody of the Peanuts Christmas specials, complete with Milhouse van Houten playing the piano in Schroeder's pose while Santa's Little Helper dances like Snoopy.
- An album of classical piano music titled Schroeder's Greatest Hits has been released by RCA Victor. Ostensibly an album recorded by Schroeder himself (though the pianist is actually Nelly Kokinos), the album consists of piano music by some of the composers that Schroeder has been known to play over the years. Beethoven, of course, but Mozart, Chopin, Brahms, and Schumann are also represented.
- In the South Park episode "A Very Crappy Christmas", he appears as the piano player for the Christmas recording session. He makes another appearance in the South Park episode "Probably" as the organist at Cartman's "children's church". An additional appearance was as the piano player in "Something You Can Do with Your Finger" in tryouts for the fifth member of Cartman's boy band.
- Schulz told an anecdote wherein he visited the grave of Beethoven and placed a Snoopy pin on it. A little girl looked at him and asked in German "Wo ist Schroeder?" ("Where's Schroeder?"). Schulz went back to his car, found a Schroeder pin and placed it on the grave instead, eliciting pleased smiles from the child and her mother.
- An older version of Schroeder appears on the Family Guy episode "Mother Tucker", alongside older versions of Charlie Brown, Linus, Peppermint Patty, Sally Brown and others, in a cutaway gag.
- Both Schroeder and Charles Schulz are honorary brothers of the Epsilon Iota Chapter (Florida State University) of the music fraternity Phi Mu Alpha Sinfonia.
- In the 2022 film Tár, conductor Lydia Tár (Cate Blanchett), while holding a masterclass at Juilliard, briefly compares the relationship between Schroeder and Lucy to the emotional structure of the works of Bach.
- In The Flash episode "Into the Speed Force", H.R. Wells refers to the theory of Schrödinger's cat as Schroeder's Cat, and is told by Cisco that Schroeder is "the kid from Peanuts who plays the piano". Wells responds that in Peanuts on his Earth, Charlie Brown plays the piano, and states that it is a recurring joke that "he's so bad at it".
