= Essential Standards =

Compilation album by Vince Guaraldi
- Released: June 30, 2009
- Recorded: 1956–1965
- Genres: Jazz; Latin jazz; Bossa nova; Soundtrack; West Coast jazz; Christmas music
- Length: 51:42
- Labels: Fantasy; Concord; Original Jazz Classics

Vince Guaraldi chronology
Live on the Air (2008)	Essential Standards (2009)	The Definitive Vince Guaraldi (2009)

Professional ratings
Review scores
Source	Rating
AllMusic	3/5 stars
Five Cents Please	5/5 stars

Essential Standards is the third compilation album of songs by American jazz pianist/composer Vince Guaraldi released on June 30, 2009, in the U.S by Concord as part of their Original Jazz Classics series.

== Background ==
Acting as a companion piece to Fantasy Records' 1980 Greatest Hits, Essential Standards includes additional songs from Guaraldi's Fantasy Records catalogue outside of his soundtrack recordings for Charles M. Schulz's Peanuts television specials.

== Track listing ==
No.	Title	Writer(s)	Original album	Length
1.	"Softly, As In a Morning Sunrise"	Oscar Hammerstein II; Sigmund Romberg	A Flower Is a Lovesome Thing (1958)	3:28
2.	"The Girl from Ipanema"	Antônio Carlos Jobim; Vinicius de Moraes	From All Sides (1965)	5:19
3.	"Moon River"	Henry Mancini	Jazz Impressions of Black Orpheus (1964)	5:16
4.	"Cast Your Fate to the Wind"	Vince Guaraldi	Jazz Impressions of Black Orpheus	3:05
5.	"Willow Weep for Me"	Ann Ronell	A Flower Is a Lovesome Thing	5:14
6.	"Fascinating Rhythm"	George Gershwin; Ira Gershwin	Vince Guaraldi Trio (1956)	2:45
7.	"Since I Fell for You"	Buddy Johnson	Jazz Impressions of Black Orpheus	4:20
8.	"Days of Wine and Roses"	Henry Mancini	Vince Guaraldi, Bola Sete and Friends (1964)	5:20
9.	"On Green Dolphin Street" (live)	Bronisław Kaper; Ned Washington	In Person (1963)	5:53
10.	"Autumn Leaves"	Joseph Kosma	A Flower Is a Lovesome Thing	4:22
11.	"Corcovado (Quiet Nights of Quiet Stars)"	Antônio Carlos Jobim	The Latin Side of Vince Guaraldi (1964)	3:20
12.	""What Child Is This"" (mistitled "Greensleeves")	William Chatterton Dix	A Charlie Brown Christmas (1965)	3:20
Total length:				51:42

== See also ==
- Vince Guaraldi discography
- List of songs recorded by Vince Guaraldi
- List of cover versions of Vince Guaraldi songs
- Lee Mendelson Film Productions
