= The Very Best of Vince Guaraldi =

Compilation album by Vince Guaraldi
- Released: August 7, 2012
- Recorded: 1956–1966
- Genres: Jazz; Latin jazz; Bossa nova; Soundtrack; West Coast jazz; Christmas music
- Length: 59:10
- Labels: Fantasy; Concord
- Producer: Nick Phillips

Vince Guaraldi chronology
An Afternoon with the Vince Guaraldi Quartet (2011)	The Very Best of Vince Guaraldi (2012)	Peanuts Greatest Hits (2015)

Professional ratings
Review scores
Source	Rating
AllMusic	3.5/5 stars
Five Cents Please	5/5 stars

The Very Best of Vince Guaraldi is the sixth compilation album of songs by American jazz pianist/composer Vince Guaraldi released on August 7, 2012, in the U.S by Fantasy/Concord Records as part of their "Very Best" series.

== Background ==
The Very Best of Vince Guaraldi was an attempt by Fantasy/Concord Records to release what AllMusic critic Al Campbell deemed a "decent budget-line" version of the more expansive, 31-track compilation The Definitive Vince Guaraldi from 2009.

== Track listing ==
All tracks are written by Vince Guaraldi except where noted.

No.	Title	Writer(s)	Original album	Length
1.	"Cast Your Fate to the Wind"		Jazz Impressions of Black Orpheus (1962)	3:09
2.	"El Matador" (live)		Live at El Matador (1966)	4:35
3.	"Softly, As In a Morning Sunrise"	Oscar Hammerstein II; Sigmund Romberg	A Flower Is a Lovesome Thing (1958)	3:31
4.	"Ginza" (aka "Ginza Samba")		From All Sides (1965)	5:28
5.	"Treat Street"		The Latin Side of Vince Guaraldi (1964)	3:03
6.	"Django"	John Lewis	Vince Guaraldi Trio (1956)	4:57
7.	"Linus and Lucy"		Jazz Impressions of A Boy Named Charlie Brown (1964)	3:06
8.	"The Lady's in Love with You"	Burton Lane; Frank Loesser	Vince Guaraldi Trio	3:56
9.	"Star Song"	Vince Guaraldi; William Siden	Vince Guaraldi, Bola Sete and Friends (1964)	4:48
10.	"Outra Vez" (live)	Antônio Carlos Jobim	In Person (1963)	2:56
11.	"Manhã de Carnaval"	Luiz Bonfá	Jazz Impressions of Black Orpheus	5:50
12.	"Charlie Brown Theme"	Vince Guaraldi; Lee Mendelson	Jazz Impressions of A Boy Named Charlie Brown	4:24
13.	"Christmas Is Coming"		A Charlie Brown Christmas (1965)	3:25
14.	"Christmas Time Is Here" (instrumental)		A Charlie Brown Christmas	6:02
Total length:				59:10

== See also ==
- Vince Guaraldi discography
- List of songs recorded by Vince Guaraldi
- List of cover versions of Vince Guaraldi songs
- Lee Mendelson Film Productions
