= A Charlie Brown Thanksgiving (soundtrack) =

2023 soundtrack album by Vince Guaraldi

A Charlie Brown Thanksgiving: Original Soundtrack Recording

Soundtrack album by Vince Guaraldi
- Released: October 20, 2023
- Recorded: August 20, 22, September 4, October 1, 1973
- Studios: Wally Heider Studios, San Francisco, California
- Genres: Jazz; Jazz-funk; Soundtrack
- Length: 37:36
- Label: Lee Mendelson Film Productions
- Producers: Jason Mendelson; Sean Mendelson

Vince Guaraldi chronology
| It's the Great Pumpkin, Charlie Brown: Original Soundtrack Recording (2018) | A Charlie Brown Thanksgiving: Original Soundtrack Recording (2023) | It Was a Short Summer, Charlie Brown: Original Soundtrack Recording (2024) |

A Charlie Brown Thanksgiving: Original Soundtrack Recording is a soundtrack album by American jazz pianist Vince Guaraldi released on October 20, 2023, in the U.S. by Lee Mendelson Film Productions. It is the soundtrack album to the Thanksgiving-themed Peanuts television special of the same name first broadcast on the CBS network on November 20, 1973. The album was the label's inaugural release and launched an ongoing archival series of Guaraldi's Peanuts soundtracks.

== Background ==
Following the death of producer Lee Mendelson in December 2019, his children undertook an extensive search of archival materials in hopes of locating original music score recordings from the Peanuts television specials. During the COVID-19 pandemic lockdown, they uncovered a collection of analog session tapes, recorded by Guaraldi for several of the specials. These recordings, which had long been presumed lost, included Guaraldi's complete music cues along with arrangements by John Scott Trotter and multiple alternate takes.

The original session tapes feature unedited, complete recordings, originally captured and mixed in stereo. These analog recordings were transferred by Deluxe Entertainment Services to high-resolution digital format at 192 kHz/24-bit from the original 2-inch, 16-track stereo masters.

== Recording ==
Guaraldi performing at Santa Clara University, January 55, 1974

Guaraldi recorded the score for A Charlie Brown Thanksgiving on August 20 and 22, September 4, and October 1, 1973, at Wally Heider Studios in San Francisco. The sessions included trumpeter Tom Harrell, trombonist Chuck Bennett, bassist Seward McCain, and drummer Mike Clark. Harrell also arranged the brass parts. This marked the third consecutive Peanuts special recorded at this studio, after the earlier soundtracks had been produced in Los Angeles.

The score makes use of electric keyboards and funk-influenced rhythms. The version of "Linus and Lucy" features Clark's drumming and brass arrangements by Harrell. The 2023 release includes a bonus mix with additional Fender Rhodes countermelodies.

For "Peppermint Patty", Guaraldi recorded separate parts on acoustic and electric keyboards, including Fender Rhodes, Wurlitzer electronic piano, and Clavinet, the latter instrument having recently been popularized by Stevie Wonder's 1972 hit "Superstition". The recording also includes the composition's bridge, which was omitted from its first appearance in You're in Love, Charlie Brown (1967).

"Little Birdie" features Guaraldi on lead vocals for the third time in a Peanuts special, accompanied by Harrell on muted trumpet. Guaraldi also played guitar on "Is It James or Charlie?" featuring a simple two-chord structure. A bonus mix replaces the guitar with a piano solo and incorporates a piano-doubling whistling technique. Four different arrangements of "Thanksgiving Theme" were recorded for the special.

The sessions produced several alternate takes. "Thanksgiving Interlude" was recorded in 17 takes, with changes in tempo and rhythm between performances. The 2023 soundtrack release includes previously unreleased recordings from the sessions, including "Clark and Guaraldi", a brief improvisation featuring Guaraldi and Clark.

== Critical reception ==
Professional ratings
Review scores
| Source | Rating |
|---|---|
| Five Cents Please | 5/5 stars |
| Pitchfork | 8.2/10 |
| All About Jazz | 3/5 stars |
| The Independent | Favourable |
| Jarrett House North | Favorable |
| MIX | Favourable |
| The Cornell Daily Sun | Favorable |

A Charlie Brown Thanksgiving: Original Soundtrack Recording 50th Anniversary Special Edition received positive reviews from music critics.

Pitchfork's Vanessa Ague praised Guaraldi's ensemble arrangements, describing the score as a "lithe, funky counterpart to the wintry, wistful moods of A Charlie Brown Christmas" (1965). Ague further noted that "A Charlie Brown Thanksgiving reminds us of the full breadth of his scores," concluding that "the genius of Guaraldi's scores was the way he mapped the many emotions that erupted in a Peanuts comic strip, and on Thanksgiving, he shows them all."

James Aren of All About Jazz highlighted the inclusion of alternate takes, stating that they reveal Guaraldi's creative process and the band's serious but playful approach. He noted that while the brief cues may leave jazz purists wanting more, the concise format helped broaden its appeal. Aren also pointed to the influence of Stevie Wonder on "Peppermint Patty," especially through Guaraldi's use of the clavinet and layered fusion textures.

Steven Wine of The Independent described the music as driven by upbeat, youthful melodies and "skittering, deceptively funky grooves," which he said felt spontaneous and natural, like "the rhythms of a playground." He called both the special and its music enduringly timeless.

The Cornell Daily Sun noted that Guaraldi's music remains integral to the emotional impact of the television special. The review gave particular attention to "Little Birdie" which underscores a comedic sequence featuring Snoopy battling a sentient lawn chair. The moment, supported by Guaraldi's playful crooning, was highlighted as adding warmth and musical humor to the scene, illustrating the broader role his music plays in shaping character tone and narrative rhythm.

When interviewed by WCB Jazz Vinyl Collector, Sean Mendelson described the music as "little nuggets of melodic candy," asserting that there is sufficient musical substance to satisfy listeners and evoke memories of their childhood.

== Track listing ==
All tracks are written by Vince Guaraldi.

| No. | Title | Length |
|---|---|---|
| 1. | "Charlie Brown Blues^{[a]}" | 1:27 |
| 2. | "Thanksgiving Theme" | 0:11 |
| 3. | "Thanksgiving Theme" (Reprise) | 1:50 |
| 4. | "Peppermint Patty^{[f]}" | 3:29 |
| 5. | "Little Birdie^{[c]}" | 3:13 |
| 6. | "Thanksgiving Interlude" | 0:30 |
| 7. | "Is It James or Charlie?^{[e]}" | 2:20 |
| 8. | "Linus and Lucy^{[b]}" | 4:15 |
| 9. | "Fife and Drums Theme" | 1:45 |
| 10. | "Charlie Brown Blues^{[f]}" (Reprise) | 2:30 |
| 11. | "Thanksgiving Interlude" (Reprise) | 0:17 |
| 12. | "Thanksgiving Theme^{[a]}^{[d]}" (2nd Reprise) | 1:59 |
| 13. | "Thanksgiving Theme" (3rd Reprise, end credits) | 0:48 |

Bonus/Alternate tracks
| No. | Title | Length |
|---|---|---|
| 14. | "Thanksgiving Theme" (Alternate) | 0:10 |
| 15. | "Peppermint Patty" (bonus mix) | 2:07 |
| 16. | "Linus and Lucy" (bonus mix) | 4:19 |
| 17. | "Thanksgiving Interlude" (Alternate takes 2, 4, and 6) | 1:16 |
| 18. | "Thanksgiving Interlude" (Alternate take 10) | 0:28 |
| 19. | "Thanksgiving Interlude" (Alternate take 14) | 0:28 |
| 20. | "Is It James or Charlie?" (Bonus mix with whistling) | 2:27 |
| 21. | "Clark and Guaraldi" | 2:01 |
| Total length: | | 37:36 |

Notes

- ^{^[a]} previously released on Charlie Brown's Holiday Hits (1998) using audio sourced from original mono television soundtrack
- ^{^[b]} horn and trumpet performances differ from television performance; televised version previously released on previously released on The Charlie Brown Suite & Other Favorites (2003) using audio sourced from Guaraldi's personal recording session reel-to-reel tapes.
- ^{^[c]} alternate vocal take; this version substitutes "What's amazing is the way you get around" for "It's amazing that the way you get around"; brass and percussion performances also differ; televised version previously released on Vince Guaraldi and the Lost Cues from the Charlie Brown Television Specials (2007) using audio sourced from Guaraldi's personal recording session reel-to-reel tapes.
- ^{^[d]} previously released on Vince Guaraldi and the Lost Cues from the Charlie Brown Television Specials (2007) using audio sourced from Guaraldi's personal recording session reel-to-reel tapes.
- ^{^[e]} previously released on Vince Guaraldi and the Lost Cues from the Charlie Brown Television Specials, Volume 2 (2008) using audio sourced from Guaraldi's personal recording session reel-to-reel tapes.
- ^{^[f]} truncated version previously released on Peanuts Portraits (2010) using audio sourced from original mono television soundtrack

== Personnel ==
Credits adapted from liner notes.

=== Musicians ===
Vince Guaraldi Quintet

- Vince Guaraldi – acoustic piano, electric keyboards, clavinet, electric guitar, vocal on "Little Birdie"
- Seward McCain – electric bass
- Tom Harrell – trumpet, brass arrangements
- Chuck Bennett – trombone
- Mike Clark – drums

Additional

- John Scott Trotter – orchestrator

=== Production ===
- Sean Mendelson – producer, liner notes
- Jason Mendelson – producer
- Vinson Hudson – restoration and mastering
- Terry Carleton – remix engineer
- Megan Rible – layout art
- Deluxe Entertainment Services Group – tape transfer

== Charts ==
=== Weekly charts ===
Weekly chart performance for A Charlie Brown Thanksgiving
| Chart (2023) | Peak position |
|---|---|
| US Kid Albums (Billboard) | 1 |
| US Top Traditional Jazz Albums (Billboard) | 6 |
| US Top Jazz Albums (Billboard) | 6 |
| US Top Tastemakers (Billboard) | 13 |
| US Top Soundtrack Albums (Billboard) | 19 |
| US Top Current Album Sales (Billboard) | 26 |
| US Top Album Sales (Billboard) | 34 |

== See also ==
- Lee Mendelson
- Bill Melendez
- Peanuts filmography
- Melendez Films
- A Charlie Brown Christmas (soundtrack) (1965)
- It's the Great Pumpkin, Charlie Brown (soundtrack) (1966)
- It's Arbor Day, Charlie Brown/Charlie Brown's All Stars! (soundtrack) (1966; 1976)
