= Peanuts Greatest Hits =

Compilation album by Vince Guaraldi
- Released: July 31, 2015
- Recorded: 1964–1973
- Genres: Jazz pop; Soundtrack
- Length: 39:15
- Labels: Fantasy; Concord; Craft
- Producer: Nick Phillips

Vince Guaraldi chronology
The Very Best of Vince Guaraldi (2012)	Peanuts Greatest Hits (2015)	The Peanuts Movie (Original Motion Picture Soundtrack) (2015)

Professional ratings
Review scores
Source	Rating
AllMusic	3.5/5 stars
Five Cents Please	5/5 stars

Peanuts Greatest Hits is the seventh compilation album by jazz pianist Vince Guaraldi (credited to the Vince Guaraldi Trio) released by Fantasy/Concord Records on July 31, 2015. The album gathers Guaraldi's most iconic compositions featured in the animated television specials based on the Peanuts comic strip by Charles M. Schulz.

== Background ==
To celebrate the 50th anniversary of A Charlie Brown Christmas, Fantasy/Concord Records assembled another collection of Guaraldi's best-known songs.

Peanuts Greatest Hits was released in CD format in July 2015. It was also released in a limited-edition picture disc vinyl format in September 2015, with images of Charlie Brown and Lucy covering each side. To celebrate the 70th anniversary of Peanuts, a second limited-edition picture disc vinyl format featuring images of Snoopy and Woodstock was released by Craft Recordings on July 24, 2020.

== Track listing ==
All tracks are written by Vince Guaraldi except where noted.

No.	Title	Writer(s)	Original album	Length
1.	"Linus and Lucy"		Jazz Impressions of A Boy Named Charlie Brown (1964)	3:06
2.	"Charlie Brown Theme"	Vince Guaraldi; Lee Mendelson	Jazz Impressions of A Boy Named Charlie Brown	4:24
3.	"Baseball Theme"		Jazz Impressions of A Boy Named Charlie Brown	3:14
4.	"Oh, Good Grief"	Vince Guaraldi; Lee Mendelson	Jazz Impressions of A Boy Named Charlie Brown	2:25
5.	"Happiness Is"		Jazz Impressions of A Boy Named Charlie Brown	3:41
6.	"Little Birdie"		Vince Guaraldi and the Lost Cues from the Charlie Brown Television Specials (2007)	3:15
7.	"The Great Pumpkin Waltz"		Charlie Brown's Holiday Hits (1998)	2:29
8.	"Thanksgiving Theme"		Charlie Brown's Holiday Hits (1998)	2:02
9.	"Christmas Is Coming"		A Charlie Brown Christmas (1965)	3:16
10.	"Christmas Time Is Here" (instrumental)		A Charlie Brown Christmas	6:05
11.	"Skating"		A Charlie Brown Christmas	2:24
12.	"Christmas Time Is Here" (vocal)	Vince Guaraldi; Lee Mendelson	A Charlie Brown Christmas	2:46
Total length:				39:15

== Personnel ==
Credits adapted from CD liner notes

- Vince Guaraldi – piano
- Monty Budwig – double bass (Tracks 1–5, 7)
- Seward McCain – electric bass (Tracks 6, 8)
- Fred Marshall – double bass (Tracks 9–12)
- Colin Bailey – drums (Track 1–5, 7)
- Mike Clark – drums (Tracks 6, 8)
- Jerry Granelli – drums (Tracks 9–12)
- Tom Harrell – trumpet (Tracks 6, 8)
- Chuck Bennett – trombone (Tracks 6, 8)
- Emmanuel Klein – trumpet (Track 7)
- John Gray – guitar (Track 7)
- Ronald Lang – woodwinds (Track 7)
- John Scott Trotter – orchestrator (Tracks 6, 8)
