= Peanuts Portraits =

Compilation album by Vince Guaraldi
- Released: April 20, 2010
- Recorded: 1964–1996
- Genres: Jazz pop; soundtrack
- Length: 36:30
- Labels: Fantasy; Concord
- Producer: Bill Belmont

Vince Guaraldi chronology
The Navy Swings (2010)	Peanuts Portraits (2010)	An Afternoon with the Vince Guaraldi Quartet (2011)

Professional ratings
Review scores
Source	Rating
AllMusic	3.5/5 stars
Five Cents Please	4/5 stars

Peanuts Portraits is the fifth compilation album by jazz pianist Vince Guaraldi released by Fantasy/Concord Records on April 20, 2010. The album contains a mix of previously released material plus alternate and extended versions of songs featured in prime-time animated television specials based on the Peanuts comic strip by Charles M. Schulz.

== Background ==
To celebrate the 60th anniversary of Charles M. Schulz's Peanuts comic strip, Fantasy/Concord Records assembled this themed compilation, with each song relating to a specific Peanuts character.

The songs "Frieda (With the Naturally Curly Hair)" and "Schroeder" are complete takes of the same versions that appeared on Jazz Impressions of A Boy Named Charlie Brown.

Four songs were originally featured in 1973's A Charlie Brown Thanksgiving, including alternate renditions of "Peppermint Patty", "Is It James or Charlie" (version 2) (mistitled "Blue Charlie Brown") and "Charlie's Blues (version 2)" appearing for the first time on a commercial release.

In addition, "The Masked Marvel" and a second version of "Linus and Lucy" are performed by New Age pianist George Winston and licensed for inclusion from Windham Hill/Dancing Cat Records.

Fantasy/Concord also inadvertently included one non-Guaraldi track ("Sally's Blues"), a music cue composed by Ed Bogas and Desirée Goyette for The Charlie Brown and Snoopy Show (CBS, 1983–85). The song bears no relation to the version of "Sally's Blues" featured in It's a Mystery, Charlie Brown (1974) released on Vince Guaraldi and the Lost Cues from the Charlie Brown Television Specials, Volume 2 (2008).

Peanuts Portraits was reissued on vinyl by Craft Recordings on August 20, 2020, to celebrate the 70th anniversary of Peanuts.

== Track listing ==
Numerous errors were made with respect to incorrect song titles. Proper titles appear with incorrectly titled tracks in parentheses.

All tracks are written by Vince Guaraldi except where noted.

No.	Title	Writer(s)	Original album/Notes	Length
1.	"Linus and Lucy"		originally released on Jazz Impressions of A Boy Named Charlie Brown (1964)	3:09
2.	"Sally's Blues"	Ed Bogas; Desirée Goyette	non-Guaraldi song; music cue composed for The Charlie Brown and Snoopy Show	1:59
3.	"Is It James or Charlie (version 2)" (mistitled "Blue Charlie Brown")		unreleased version; version 1 released on Vince Guaraldi and the Lost Cues from the Charlie Brown Television Specials, Volume 2 (2008); appeared in A Charlie Brown Thanksgiving (1973)	2:05
4.	"Peppermint Patty" (edit)		unreleased, truncated version; complete version appeared in A Charlie Brown Thanksgiving	2:39
5.	"Charlie's Blues (version 2)" (aka "Charlie Brown Blues" and "Play It Again, Charlie Brown")		unreleased version; appeared in A Charlie Brown Thanksgiving	2:30
6.	"Joe Cool" (whistling instrumental with brass)		originally released on Vince Guaraldi and the Lost Cues from the Charlie Brown Television Specials, Volume 2 (2007); appeared in It's a Mystery, Charlie Brown	2:57
7.	"Frieda (With the Naturally Curly Hair)" (extended version)		abridged version originally released on Jazz Impressions of a Boy Named Charlie Brown	6:07
8.	"Schroeder" (extended version)		abridged version originally released on Jazz Impressions of a Boy Named Charlie Brown	2:56
9.	"Little Birdie"		originally released on Vince Guaraldi and the Lost Cues from the Charlie Brown Television Specials; appeared in A Charlie Brown Thanksgiving	3:16
10.	"The Masked Marvel" (performed by George Winston)		originally released on Linus and Lucy: The Music of Vince Guaraldi (1996)	5:37
11.	"Linus and Lucy" (performed by George Winston)		originally released on Linus and Lucy: The Music of Vince Guaraldi	3:15
Total length:				36:30

== See also ==
- Vince Guaraldi discography
- List of songs recorded by Vince Guaraldi
- List of cover versions of Vince Guaraldi songs
- Lee Mendelson Film Productions
