= It's the Easter Beagle, Charlie Brown =

1974 animated television special by Phil Roman

- Also known as: A Charlie Brown Easter
- Genre: Animated television special
- Created by: Peanuts by Charles M. Schulz
- Written by: Charles M. Schulz
- Directed by: Phil Roman
- Voices of: Todd Barbee; Melanie Kohn; Stephen Shea; Lynn Mortensen; Jimmy Ahrens; Linda Ercoli; Bill Melendez
- Music by: Vince Guaraldi
- Opening theme: "Easter Theme"
- Ending theme: "Easter Theme" (reprise)
- Country of origin: United States
- Original language: English

Production
- Executive producer: Lee Mendelson
- Producer: Bill Melendez
- Editors: Chuck McCann; Roger Donley
- Running time: 25 minutes
- Production companies: Lee Mendelson Film Productions; Bill Melendez Productions

Original release
- Network: CBS
- Release: April 9, 1974

Related
- It's a Mystery, Charlie Brown (1974); Be My Valentine, Charlie Brown (1975)

It's the Easter Beagle, Charlie Brown! is the 12th prime-time animated TV special based on the comic strip Peanuts by Charles M. Schulz. In the United States, it debuted on CBS on April 9, 1974, at 8 p.m., five days before Easter.

It's the Easter Beagle, Charlie Brown received an Emmy nomination for Outstanding Children's Special at the 27th Primetime Emmy Awards in 1975. It was one of two Peanuts specials nominated that year, along with Be My Valentine, Charlie Brown, but they both lost to Yes, Virginia, there is a Santa Claus (another Bill Melendez production).

== Synopsis ==
As Easter approaches, the Peanuts gang busily prepares for the holiday, though Linus remains steadfast in his belief that their efforts are unnecessary. He fervently argues that the "Easter Beagle" will ensure everything is taken care of, but his insistence is largely dismissed by his friends. The only one who listens is Charlie Brown's sister, Sally, though she remains hesitant due to their previous experience with the Great Pumpkin during Halloween.

Meanwhile, Peppermint Patty and Marcie embark on a quest to dye Easter eggs. However, Marcie, new to the task, struggles with the process. Their first attempt goes awry when Marcie mistakenly fries all the eggs on a griddle. Undeterred, they try again, but Marcie further misinterprets the instructions, using a waffle iron, toaster, and conventional oven. With their final carton of eggs, Peppermint Patty explains the proper method — boiling the eggs. Unfortunately, Marcie cracks the eggs before boiling them, leaving Peppermint Patty exasperated and out of both eggs and money.

Elsewhere, after enduring a cold spring rain, Woodstock seeks shelter with Snoopy, who kindly purchases him a birdhouse. Initially, Woodstock is unimpressed, but he soon transforms it into a luxurious bachelor pad. However, Snoopy's curiosity gets the better of him, and while inspecting the birdhouse, he accidentally destroys it, forcing him to buy a new one, which Woodstock does not bother furnishing.

Lucy, determined to win at an Easter Egg hunt, organizes her own private hunt. She painstakingly hides and tracks each egg so she can find them all again and win. Unbeknownst to her, Snoopy follows behind, snatching them up. When Easter morning arrives, the Easter Beagle, revealed as Snoopy, distributes eggs to everyone, including Woodstock and Lucy. Unfortunately for Charlie Brown, Snoopy runs out of eggs by the time he reaches him.

After receiving their eggs, Marcie, following Peppermint Patty's advice, eats one without removing the shell, declaring it tastes awful. Sally, now a believer in the Easter Beagle, is content, while Lucy realizes the egg she received was one of her own. Furious, she confronts Snoopy, but a kiss from him softens her anger, leaving her hopeful for the next Easter season.

== Voice cast ==
- Todd Barbee as Charlie Brown
- Melanie Kohn as Lucy van Pelt
- Stephen Shea as Linus van Pelt
- Todd Barbee as Schroeder
- Linda Ercoli as Peppermint Patty
- Lynn Mortensen as Sally Brown
- Jimmy Ahrens as Marcie
- Bill Melendez as Snoopy/Woodstock

== Production notes ==
=== Soundtrack ===
The music for It's the Easter Beagle, Charlie Brown was composed by Vince Guaraldi and conducted/arranged by John Scott Trotter. The score was recorded by the Vince Guaraldi Quartet on January 30 and March 1, 1974, at Wally Heider Studios, featuring Guaraldi (piano, electric piano, electric harpsichord, electric guitar), Seward McCain (electric bass), Robert Claire (flute), Glenn Cronkhite (drums), and Eliot Zigmund (drums).

Prior to the 2025 release of the complete official soundtrack, select cues appeared on various archival and compilation albums, including "Snoopy and Woodstock" and "Kitchen Music" on Vince Guaraldi and the Lost Cues from the Charlie Brown Television Specials, Volume 2 (2008), as well as a live extended performance of "Woodstock's Pad" on Live on the Air (2008).

On March 21, 2025, the complete original remastered recordings were officially released by Lee Mendelson Film Productions for the first time, presenting the full score along with a newly recorded bonus track.

=== Voice talent ===
It's the Easter Beagle, Charlie Brown was the last special for Todd Barbee; he would be replaced by Duncan Watson. Peppermint Patty is voiced by Linda Ercoli (who previously voiced Clara, the annoying girl in Snoopy Come Home (1972)). This would be her only time voicing her.

== Television ==
CBS aired It's the Easter Beagle, Charlie Brown annually during each Easter season from 1974 to 2000. The premiere airing of the special in 1974 ranked No. 12 in the Nielsen ratings that week, between the 1965 film The Greatest Story Ever Told and The Bob Newhart Show.

ABC ran the special annually from 2001 up to April 11, 2006. In 2007, the network, without any explanation, did not air the program, but it returned on March 18, 2008, as filler programming against American Idol. The TV special was watched by 6.32 million viewers, in fourth place behind Idol, NCIS and The Biggest Loser, and fifth place if Spanish-language Univision is counted. ABC refrained from airing the special in 2011 or 2012, but it aired on Easter Sunday 2013 along with Charlie Brown's All-Stars (1966), watched by 2.56 million people, tied for fourth place behind the end of the NCAA Championship Basketball Game between Duke and Louisville and a rerun of The Voice. The special aired again with Charlie Brown's All-Stars on Easter Sunday in 2014. To date this is the last broadcast airing of the special.

Apple TV+ has held exclusive rights to the special along with all other Peanuts productions since 2021. It was not included among the specials that Apple TV+ must provide for free in short windows surrounding their holidays (or to PBS for free over-the-air airings) and thus it will only be available to subscribers.

== Home media ==
It's the Easter Beagle, Charlie Brown was released to DVD twice, first on March 4, 2003 by Paramount Home Entertainment and again on February 19, 2008 on a Remastered Deluxe Edition DVD from Warner Home Video. It was also released in the UK by Firefly Entertainment in 2004, with Life Is a Circus, Charlie Brown.

Earlier home media releases of It's the Easter Beagle, Charlie Brown have, in the past, been available in 1982 on the CED format, on VHS in 1986 and 1988 from Media Home Entertainment and subsidiary Hi-Tops Video, respectively and by Paramount Home Video on March 9, 1994 in a slipcover package and on October 1, 1996 in clamshell packaging.

On October 7, 2025, it was released on the DVD and Blu-Ray collection Peanuts: 75th Anniversary Ultimate TV Specials Collection along with 39 other Peanuts specials.

== See also ==
- List of Easter television episodes
