= Jazz Impressions =

Compilation album by Vince Guaraldi
- Released: March 1964
- Recorded: 1955 – 1958
- Genres: Jazz; West Coast jazz
- Length: 36:56
- Label: Fantasy

Vince Guaraldi chronology
Vince Guaraldi, Bola Sete and Friends (1964)	Jazz Impressions (1964)	The Latin Side of Vince Guaraldi (1964)

Professional ratings
Review scores
Source	Rating
AllMusic	3/5 stars
Five Cents Please	4/5 stars
The Penguin Guide to Jazz Recordings	2.5/4 stars

Jazz Impressions is the first compilation album of songs by American jazz pianist and composer Vince Guaraldi. The compilation was released in March 1964.

== Background ==
In an effort to capitalize on the unexpected success of the song "Cast Your Fate to the Wind" two years earlier, Fantasy Records hastily compiled what Guaraldi historian and author Derrick Bang referred to as "something of a clandestine 'greatest hits' collection." All the songs included were taken from Vince Guaraldi Trio (1956) and A Flower Is a Lovesome Thing (1958). Fantasy later released what they considered a true "greatest hits" collection in 1980, four years after Guaraldi's death. That album, simply titled Greatest Hits, picked up where Jazz Impressions left off, compiling songs from the remainder of Guaraldi's Fantasy catalogue.

Fantasy re-released Jazz Impressions in 1975 and 1987. It was remastered for CD release in 1995.

== Track listing ==
Side One
No.	Title	Writer(s)	Original album	Length
1.	"Django"	John Lewis	Vince Guaraldi Trio (1956)	4:55
2.	"Fenwyck's Farfel"	Vince Guaraldi	Vince Guaraldi Trio	4:07
3.	"Yesterdays"	Jerome Kern	A Flower Is a Lovesome Thing (1957)	3:50
4.	"Room at the Bottom" (originally titled "Like a Mighty Rose")	Vince Guaraldi	A Flower Is a Lovesome Thing	4:30

Side Two
No.	Title	Writer(s)	Original album	Length
5.	"A Flower Is a Lovesome Thing"	Billy Strayhorn	A Flower Is a Lovesome Thing	5:37
6.	"Willow Weep for Me"	Ann Ronell	A Flower Is a Lovesome Thing	5:14
7.	"Autumn Leaves"	Joseph Kosma	A Flower Is a Lovesome Thing	4:22
8.	"Three Coins in the Fountain"	Sammy Cahn; Jule Styne	Vince Guaraldi Trio	4:06
Total length:				36:56

== Personnel ==
Credits adapted from 1995 CD liner notes.

Vince Guaraldi Trio

- Vince Guaraldi – piano
- Eddie Duran – guitar
- Dean Reilly – double bass

Additional

- Grover Sales Jr. – liner notes

== See also ==
- Vince Guaraldi discography
- List of songs recorded by Vince Guaraldi
- List of cover versions of Vince Guaraldi songs
- Lee Mendelson Film Productions
