= Greatest Hits (Vince Guaraldi album) =

Compilation album by Vince Guaraldi
- Released: 1980
- Recorded: 1962 – 1966
- Genres: Jazz; Latin jazz; Bossa nova; Soundtrack; West Coast jazz; Christmas music
- Length: 39:23 (vinyl, cassette); 57:14 (CD)
- Label: Fantasy

Vince Guaraldi chronology
A Boy Named Charlie Brown: Selections from the Film Soundtrack (1970)	Greatest Hits (1980)	Charlie Brown's Holiday Hits (1998)

Alternate cover
- Fantasy 1989 CD release cover art

Professional ratings
Review scores
Source	Rating
AllMusic	4/5 stars
Five Cents Please	4/5 stars
The Penguin Guide to Jazz Recordings	3/4 stars

Greatest Hits is the second compilation album of songs by American jazz pianist/composer Vince Guaraldi released in 1980 in the U.S., Canada and Europe.

== Background ==
Released four years after Guaraldi's death from a ruptured abdominal aortic aneurysm, Greatest Hits was Fantasy Records' attempt to gather the pianist's best known songs, picking up from where the 1964 compilation album Jazz Impressions left off. As the album was issued by Fantasy, it excluded tracks from Guaraldi's three Warner Bros.-Seven Arts releases (Oh Good Grief!, The Eclectic Vince Guaraldi, Alma-Ville) as well as Vince Guaraldi with the San Francisco Boys Chorus (1967) released on Guaraldi's own D&D record label.

Greatest Hits was repackaged and expanded for CD release on July 11, 1989, with a different cover and one additional track culled from the album From All Sides (1965).

== Track listing ==
=== Original 1980 vinyl/cassette issue ===
For the vinyl/cassette release, 45 single edit versions of "Days of Wine and Roses", "Samba de Orpheus" and "Zelao" were utilized, while the shorter version of "Christmas Time Is Here" with vocals was included.

Side One
No.	Title	Writer(s)	Original album	Length
1.	"Cast Your Fate to the Wind"	Vince Guaraldi	Jazz Impressions of Black Orpheus (1962)	2:58
2.	"Treat Street"	Vince Guaraldi	The Latin Side of Vince Guaraldi (1964)	2:54
3.	"Mr. Lucky"	Henry Mancini	The Latin Side of Vince Guaraldi	2:52
4.	"I'm a Loser" (live)	John Lennon; Paul McCartney	Live at El Matador (1966)	2:42
5.	"Days of Wine and Roses" (single edit)	Henry Mancini	Vince Guaraldi, Bola Sete and Friends (1964)	2:31
6.	"Star Song"	Vince Guaraldi; William Siden	Vince Guaraldi, Bola Sete and Friends	4:46
7.	"Outra Vez" (live)	Antônio Carlos Jobim	In Person (1963)	2:53

Side Two
No.	Title	Writer(s)	Original album	Length
1.	"Samba de Orpheus" (single edit)	Luiz Bonfá	Jazz Impressions of Black Orpheus	3:12
2.	"Manhã de Carnaval"	Luiz Bonfá	Jazz Impressions of Black Orpheus	5:45
3.	"Zelao" (live, single edit)	Sérgio Ricardo	In Person	2:53
4.	"Oh, Good Grief"	Vince Guaraldi; Lee Mendelson	Jazz Impressions of A Boy Named Charlie Brown (1964)	2:21
5.	"Linus and Lucy"	Vince Guaraldi	Jazz Impressions of A Boy Named Charlie Brown	3:03
6.	"Christmas Time Is Here" (vocal)	Vince Guaraldi; Lee Mendelson	A Charlie Brown Christmas (1965)	2:40
Total length:				39:23

=== 1989 CD release ===
For the CD release, "Days of Wine and Roses", "Samba de Orpheus" and "Zelao" were restored to their original album lengths, while the longer, instrumental version of "Christmas Time Is Here" was featured. "Ginza Samba" was also added as a bonus track.

No.	Title	Writer(s)	Original album	Length
1.	"Cast Your Fate to the Wind"	Vince Guaraldi	Jazz Impressions of Black Orpheus (1962)	2:58
2.	"Ginza Samba"	Vince Guaraldi	From All Sides (1965)	† 5:23
3.	"Mr. Lucky"	Henry Mancini	The Latin Side of Vince Guaraldi	2:52
4.	"Treat Street"	Vince Guaraldi	The Latin Side of Vince Guaraldi (1964)	2:54
5.	"I'm a Loser" (live)	John Lennon; Paul McCartney	Live at El Matador (1966)	2:42
6.	"Days of Wine and Roses"	Henry Mancini	Vince Guaraldi, Bola Sete and Friends (1964)	5:23
7.	"Star Song"	Vince Guaraldi; William Siden	Vince Guaraldi, Bola Sete and Friends	4:46
8.	"Outra Vez" (live)	Antônio Carlos Jobim	In Person (1963)	2:53
9.	"Samba de Orpheus"	Luiz Bonfá	Jazz Impressions of Black Orpheus	5:37
10.	"Manhã de Carnaval"	Luiz Bonfá	Jazz Impressions of Black Orpheus	5:47
11.	"Zelao" (live)	Sérgio Ricardo	In Person	4:30
12.	"Oh, Good Grief"	Vince Guaraldi; Lee Mendelson	Jazz Impressions of A Boy Named Charlie Brown (1964)	2:21
13.	"Linus and Lucy"	Vince Guaraldi	Jazz Impressions of A Boy Named Charlie Brown	3:03
14.	"Christmas Time Is Here" (instrumental)	Vince Guaraldi	A Charlie Brown Christmas (1965)	6:02
Total length:				57:14

† = bonus track

== Personnel ==
Credits adapted from 1989 CD liner notes.

- Vince Guaraldi – piano
- Bola Sete – guitar (Tracks 2, 5–7)
- Eddie Duran – guitar (Tracks 3, 4, 8, 11)
- Monty Budwig – double bass (Tracks 1, 2, 9, 10, 12–14)
- Fred Marshall – double bass (Tracks 3, 4, 6–8, 11)
- Colin Bailey – drums (Tracks 1, 8–14)
- Nick Martinez – drums (Track 2)
- Jerry Granelli – drums (Tracks 3, 4, 6, 7)
- Lee Charlton – drums (Track 5)
- Bill Fitch – congas (Tracks 3, 4)
- Benny Velarde – timbales (Tracks 3, 4); güiro (Tracks 8, 11)

Additional

- Gene Santoro – liner notes

== See also ==
- Vince Guaraldi discography
- List of songs recorded by Vince Guaraldi
- List of cover versions of Vince Guaraldi songs
- Lee Mendelson Film Productions
