= Embraceable You (disambiguation) =

"Embraceable You" is a 1928 (published in 1930) popular song with music and lyrics by the American duo George and Ira Gershwin.

"Embraceable You" may also refer to:

- Embraceable You (film), starring Dane Clark and Geraldine Brooks
- Embraceable You (album), a 1957 album by Chet Baker
