= North Beach (album) =

Compilation album by Vince Guaraldi
- Released: January 19, 2006
- Recorded: 1969–1976
- Venues: Jazz clubs based in North Beach, San Francisco, California
- Studios: Pacific Coast Recorders, San Francisco, California; Wally Heider Studios, San Francisco, California
- Genres: Jazz; Jazz fusion
- Length: 51:45
- Labels: D & D
- Producer: David Guaraldi

Vince Guaraldi chronology
Oaxaca (2004)	North Beach (2006)	Vince Guaraldi and the Lost Cues from the Charlie Brown Television Specials (2007)

Professional ratings
Review scores
Source	Rating
Five Cents Please	4/5 stars

North Beach is a compilation album by American jazz pianist Vince Guaraldi (credited to Vince Guaraldi and Friends) released by D & D Records (Guaraldi's label) in January 2006. The album is a mix of previously unreleased studio and live recordings taped in mid-1970s.

== Background ==
In the mid-2000s, Vince Guaraldi's son, David Guaraldi, worked to restore a wealth of unreleased live recorded material from his father's archives. The recordings on North Beach were taped in a variety of studios and jazz clubs based in the North Beach neighborhood of San Francisco, California.

The release features covers of Elton John's "Your Song" and Ervin Drake's "It Was a Very Good Year".

North Beach was released on CD only. It did not receive a vinyl release.

== Track listing ==
All tracks are written by Vince Guaraldi, except where noted.

No.	Title	Writer(s)	Notes	Length
1.	"Cast Your Fate to the Wind" (live)		recorded February 6, 1974	3:48
2.	"Autumn Leaves"	Joseph Kosma	recorded October 8, 1973	7:17
3.	"Your Song"	Elton John; Bernie Taupin	recorded November 20, 1975	5:58
4.	"Lucifer's Lady" (live)			6:48
5.	"It Was a Very Good Year"	Ervin Drake		7:31
6.	"Linus and Lucy" (live)		recorded February 6, 1974	4:13
7.	"Cabaret" (live)	Fred Ebb; John Kander	recorded February 6, 1974	7:41
8.	"The Masked Marvel"		complete monaural version of recording released on Alma-Ville (1969); recorded mid-to-late October 1969	5:42
9.	"Cast Your Fate to the Wind" (alternate version)		most likely recorded January 1976	2:51
Total length:				51:45

"Cast Your Fate to the Wind", "Linus and Lucy" and "Cabaret" were re-released on Live on the Air (2008) live album.

== Session information ==
"Cast Your Fate to the Wind" (live)

- Written by Vince Guaraldi
- Piano, Fender Rhodes: Vince Guaraldi
- Electric bass: Seward McCain
- Drums: Eliot Zigmund
- Recorded on February 6, 1974, Wally Heider Studios, San Francisco, California; live broadcast on radio stations KPFA and KPFB

"Autumn Leaves"

- Written by Joseph Kosma
- Piano: Vince Guaraldi
- Double bass: Ron McClure
- Drums: Mike Clark
- Recorded on October 8, 1973

"Your Song"

- Written by Elton John and Bernie Taupin
- Piano, Fender Rhodes, ARP String Ensemble: Vince Guaraldi
- Recorded on November 20, 1975, Wally Heider Studios, San Francisco, California; sidemen unspecified

"Lucifer's Lady" (live)

- Written by Vince Guaraldi
- Piano: Vince Guaraldi
- Session information unknown

"It Was a Very Good Year" (live)

- Written by Ervin Drake
- Piano: Vince Guaraldi
- Session information unknown

"Linus and Lucy" (live)

- Written by Vince Guaraldi
- Piano: Vince Guaraldi
- Electric bass: Seward McCain
- Drums: Eliot Zigmund
- Recorded on February 6, 1974, Wally Heider Studios, San Francisco, California; live broadcast on radio stations KPFA and KPFB

"Cabaret" (live)

- Written by Fred Ebb and John Kander
- Piano, Fender Rhodes: Vince Guaraldi
- Electric bass: Seward McCain
- Drums: Eliot Zigmund
- Recorded on February 6, 1974, Wally Heider Studios, San Francisco, California; live broadcast on radio stations KPFA and KPFB

"The Masked Marvel"

- Written by Vince Guaraldi
- Piano: Vince Guaraldi
- Guitar: Eddie Duran
- Bass: Kelly Bryan
- Drums: Al Coster
- Recorded in mid-to-late October 1969

"Cast Your Fate to the Wind" (live)

- Written by Vince Guaraldi
- Piano, Fender Rhodes: Vince Guaraldi
- Session information unavailable; most likely recorded January 1976

== Personnel ==
- David Guaraldi – producer, liner notes
- Michael Graves – engineer (audio restoration)
- Russell Bond – mastering

== See also ==
- Vince Guaraldi discography
- List of songs recorded by Vince Guaraldi
- List of cover versions of Vince Guaraldi songs
- Lee Mendelson Film Productions
