= Woodstock (Peanuts) =

Peanuts comic strip character

- Peanuts character
- First appearance: March 4, 1966 (twins) April 4, 1967 (solo)(unnamed until June 22, 1970); Snoopy Come Home (1972 feature film)
- Last appearance: January 16, 2000 (comic strip)
- Created by: Charles M. Schulz
- Voiced by: Bill Melendez (1972–2006; 2015 archival recordings in Snoopy's Grand Adventure and The Peanuts Movie); Jason Serinus (1980); Victoria Frenz (2002); Andy Beall (2011); Dylan Jones (2018–present); Robert Tinkler (2019–present)

In-universe information
- Gender: Male
- Family: Mom, Grandpa, siblings

Woodstock is a fictional character in Charles M. Schulz's comic strip Peanuts. He is a small yellow bird of unspecified species and Snoopy's best friend. The character first appeared in the March 4, 1966, strip, though he was not given a name until June 22, 1970. He is named after the Woodstock festival of 1969.

== History ==
Snoopy wordlessly interacted with a hummingbird, using only punctuation and musical notes, as early as 1951. In the early 1960s, Snoopy began befriending birds when they started using his doghouse for various purposes: a rest stop during migrations, a nesting site, a community hall, or a place to play cards. None of these birds were ever given a name, although they did, on occasion (e.g., July 10, 1962), use speech balloons, lettered in what would become the classic 'chicken scratch marks' of Woodstock's utterances. What set Woodstock apart from all these earlier birds was that he attached himself to Snoopy and assumed the role of Snoopy's sidekick and assistant. There had been no recurring relationships between Snoopy and the earlier birds who visited the yard of the Browns, and Snoopy was more often than not more hostile than friendly toward those birds.

In the Peanuts daily comic strip on March 3, 1966, a mother bird flew in while Snoopy was lying on top of his doghouse, nested on top of his stomach and flew away. Soon afterward two chicks hatched in the nest, one of which hung around Snoopy throughout the spring, and returned the following spring on April 4, 1967. Schulz began to establish character traits for Snoopy's new friend by revealing that he could talk (or at least emote), that he didn't like flying south every winter, and that he struggled with flying. By the end of this four-strip sequence, Snoopy, in character as the World War I Flying Ace, learns that the bird is his new mechanic, Woodstock's first supporting role.

After this introduction, the unnamed Woodstock is seen with Snoopy on occasion, and other birds continue to appear as they had for years. But Woodstock is singled out as the bird who befriended Snoopy, in part by continuing references to him as the Flying Ace's mechanic (July 12, 1967; June 12–14, 1968). On June 14, 1968, 14 months after his first landing on Snoopy and after a second appearance as a supporting character for Snoopy (his wrist wrestling partner on April 25, 1968), the most important aspect of Woodstock's relationship with Snoopy is made clear: Snoopy first refers to this bird as his buddy. This identification was more than enough for readers to know if they hadn't already figured it out, that this little bird, name or no name, had assumed the role of a regular character in the Peanuts cast.

Schulz did not give him a name until June 22, 1970. Schulz acknowledged in several print and TV interviews in the mid-1970s that he took Woodstock's name from the rock festival. (The festival's logo shows a bird perched on a guitar.)

== Character ==
Woodstock is a bird who is Snoopy's best friend. The only non-bird character who can understand Woodstock's speech is Snoopy. When depicted in the comic strip, his speech is rendered almost entirely in "chicken scratch" marks, with Snoopy's either directly translating or allowing the reader to deduce Woodstock's meaning in the context of Snoopy's replies. Woodstock does make nonverbal noises such as yawns, laughter, sighs and "Z"s or snores to indicate sleep. He also uses punctuation marks like "!" or "??" to indicate emotions. In the movies and television specials, the chicken scratches are rendered audibly as a staccato series of high-pitched honks and squawks by Snoopy's voice actor Bill Melendez. Woodstock often works as Snoopy's secretary (most notably when the latter was appointed "Head Beagle"), and caddies for him when he plays golf (usually with some difficulty). Woodstock also plays American football with Snoopy, usually attempting to catch the ball but, due to his size, he is simply hit by it; sometimes getting embedded into the ground a short distance.

Woodstock is a small and good-hearted yellow bird. He resourcefully wins the river rafting race in Race for Your Life, Charlie Brown after all other contestants have been eliminated. He routinely takes Snoopy's gentle verbal digs and practical jokes in stride, though he does not hesitate to stand up to Snoopy if his friend goes too far. Once, he and Snoopy stopped speaking to each other because of Snoopy's practice of reading War and Peace one word per day. When told that Woodstock was being attacked by the cat next door, Snoopy immediately rushed to his aid, getting clobbered in the process (what the cat was attacking ended up being a yellow glove). He also hates being mistaken for the wrong species of bird (though we are never told what species he actually is), and he is reluctant to eat thrown bread crumbs because he doesn't want anyone to think he's on welfare, and when asked about his net income by Snoopy in his 'census-taker' persona, he replied "four worms a day". He's a whiz at playing trivia too, and almost always manages to stump Snoopy.

Woodstock is also a skilled whistler. In the TV special, She's a Good Skate, Charlie Brown, when Peppermint Patty's music for a skating competition fails to play due to a malfunction that cannot be repaired expediently, Woodstock steps up to the microphone and whistles a flawless O Mio Babbino Caro, to which Peppermint Patty performs her routine. He also whistles his part in the song "The Best of Buddies" (via an instrumental version entitled "Woodstock's Samba") in the feature film Snoopy Come Home.

For all of Woodstock's acumen and talent, he is physically a very poor flyer, which has been a character trait since he first appeared. He flutters around erratically, often upside down, and frequently crashes into things. He usually manages to get where he wants to go as long as he doesn't have to fly too high. He is prone to beak-bleeds if he goes over 10 feet in the air. Despite his difficulty in flying like a bird, he is skilled in piloting Snoopy as a canine helicopter. When asked where he learned to pilot, Woodstock replied (speaking in his usual chicken scratches, but translated), "Nam." This gag appeared in the strip several times as well as in It's Your First Kiss, Charlie Brown.

During the winter, he relaxes by either skating or playing ice hockey on top of the birdbath, complete with his own Zamboni machine to keep the surface clean (except one year where Woodstock asks Snoopy to migrate with him, and the duo takes the trip on foot). His one goal throughout the comic is to track down his mother so he can send her a Mother's Day card.

In the TV special, It's the Easter Beagle, Charlie Brown, Snoopy buys Woodstock a birdhouse to replace his nest after a cold early spring rain. At first, Woodstock refused to use it, so Snoopy forced the issue. Checking up later on Woodstock, Snoopy peers into the birdhouse to find Woodstock has converted it into a 1970s-style leisure room (complete with a quadraphonic stereo system) that appears much larger on the inside than from outside (much like Snoopy's doghouse). Unfortunately, Snoopy gets his nose stuck in the door and demolishes the house, so he buys Woodstock a second birdhouse, which Woodstock accepts.

Woodstock and his fellow yellow birds (named Bill, Harriet, Olivier, Raymond, Fred, Roy, Wilson and Conrad) often join Snoopy for group activities, with Snoopy as the de facto leader. Most frequently, they embark on Beagle Scout expeditions with Snoopy as scoutmaster, or as a patrol of the French Foreign Legion on their march for Fort Zinderneuf, led by Snoopy as their sergeant. They also have formed football and ice hockey teams (on one occasion a football team composed of Snoopy and the birds defeated a human football team led by Peppermint Patty). The birds and Snoopy occasionally are shown playing bridge. Although all but Raymond (who is purple) and Harriet (with a red ribbon) look alike, Snoopy seems to be able to tell them apart.

An important and recurring characteristic of Woodstock is his absurdly and hilariously high physical strength and endurance, considering he couldn't weigh more than about 50 grams. When playing hockey against Snoopy on his "home ice" (a frozen birdbath), he administers the beagle a severe body check that sends Snoopy flying clear out of the birdbath. In another instance, Woodstock discovers a "strange creature" in his nest. Linus wants to investigate the nest and asks Snoopy to "give him a boost" so he can reach the tree's lowest branch, which Snoopy does. The branch being still out of Linus's reach, Woodstock gives Snoopy and Linus both a boost, holding them in the air at wings' length, finally allowing Linus to climb the tree. Another strip has Snoopy once again try to determine what species Woodstock belongs to. Snoopy theorizes Woodstock might be an eagle. Since Snoopy has heard somewhere that eagles are capable of lifting a small child, he suggests Woodstock try that with Linus. The bird successfully lifts Linus with his wings three inches in the air and holds him up. The last instance is when Snoopy, posing as a football coach, is angry at his player Woodstock for losing "the book with all our secret plays" and orders the bird to run twenty thousand laps around the field as punishment. Woodstock fearfully complies.

The TV special It's a Mystery, Charlie Brown was mainly centered around Woodstock. The entire cold open and first act of the special involves Woodstock building his nest and taking a bird bath, and getting caught in a rainstorm, which, to Woodstock, is like a typhoon. The special centers around the theft of his nest and Snoopy, dressed as the World Famous Detective, trying to find out who did it.

Both Snoopy and Woodstock were voiced by José Cuauhtémoc "Bill" Meléndez from 1972 to 2006.

== Music ==
Composer Vince Guaraldi wrote several pieces associated with Woodstock for the animated Peanuts television specials. Among the earliest was "Woodstock's Wake-Up", heard in You're Not Elected, Charlie Brown (1972). Guaraldi subsequently developed a broader group of character cues for Woodstock, including "Little Birdie", "Snoopy and Woodstock", "Woodstock's Dream", "Woodstock's Pad", "Woodstock's Mambo", "Woodstock's Revenge" and "Sprinkle Your Bird".

Several of these compositions use contrasting musical styles to reflect different aspects of the character. "Woodstock's Mambo", written for Be My Valentine, Charlie Brown (1975), combines Latin jazz rhythms with syncopated percussion and a playful synthesizer melody, while the shorter "Woodstock's Revenge" uses irregular rhythmic changes, brief piano figures and rapid synthesizer passages for comic effect. For It's the Easter Beagle, Charlie Brown (1974), Guaraldi used a more prominent group of Woodstock-related themes. "Snoopy and Woodstock", a reworking of the earlier "Mystery Theme", employs guitar in a funk-influenced arrangement, while "Woodstock's Pad" uses electric harpsichord in a similarly contemporary style.

"Woodstock's Dream", which recurs throughout Easter Beagle, is built around subtonic and subdominant harmonies and was adapted from an improvisational passage in composer Lynn Shurtleff's chamber work Sing Unto the Lord a New Song. Guaraldi and Shurtleff had previously collaborated on The Charlie Brown Suite in 1969. The composition was later included with "Woodstock's Wake-Up", "Little Birdie" and "Thanksgiving Theme" in a "Woodstock Medley" arranged by pianist David Benoit. Recorded in 2021 with bassist Seward McCain and drummer Mike Clark, the medley joined melodies from several Guaraldi-scored specials into a single extended arrangement.

== Development ==
Schulz explained in a 1982 interview:

Woodstock was not yet even Woodstock. He was Snoopy's secretary, because by then I had also started to have Snoopy do a little bit of writing. I did a whole series on National Secretaries Week. Snoopy would dictate things to Woodstock and Woodstock would do the things that secretaries do, making fun of them. And then I realized that I had a nice little friendship going there. But if Woodstock was Snoopy's secretary, it would most likely mean that this little bird was a girl. Well, having her be a girl spoiled the little relationship between Snoopy and the bird. So, after reading Life magazine and all about the Woodstock Festival, I decided that Woodstock would make a good name for the bird. Then this secretary suddenly became a little male bird and instead of a secretary was simply Snoopy's friend, although he still takes dictation now and then. But that's how the whole thing over a period of years developed into one little character. And then, as the character developed, Woodstock took over a lot of the innocence that Snoopy had when he was a lot younger.

Despite this, Woodstock was referred to as a male as early as the strip from June 12, 1968.

In the Norwegian translation of Peanuts, the bird is named "Fredrikke"—a female name—and is always referred to as female. Finnish translation uses the name "Kaustinen", without a specified gender and Spanish translations use the name "Emilio"—a male name.

== Species ==
At one point Snoopy attempts to identify what type of bird Woodstock is with the aid of a field guide, asking Woodstock to attempt to imitate various birds: American bittern, Carolina wren, rufous-sided towhee, yellow-billed cuckoo, Canada goose, warbler, and mourning warbler. Snoopy finally gives up trying to figure it out, and says, "For all I know, you're a duck!" Woodstock then cries and Snoopy hugs him and apologizes.

Despite being a bird, Woodstock is a very poor flyer. This may be because of his small wings, or due to his mother abandoning him. Snoopy had to teach him to fly. Woodstock flitters around in erratic fashion, often upside down, and frequently crashes into things. Woodstock's bird friends are the same species and are also bad flyers. Once, Woodstock and his bird friends wanted to go hiking to the summit of "Point Lobos". Lucy laughs at them and says that they are stupid because they are birds and can just fly.

== Awards and honors ==
Schulz was a keen bridge player, and Peanuts occasionally included bridge references. In 1997 the American Contract Bridge League (ACBL), awarded both Snoopy and Woodstock the honorary rank of Life Master, and Schulz was delighted.
