= An Afternoon with the Vince Guaraldi Quartet =

Live album by Vince Guaraldi
- Released: November 24, 2011
- Recorded: October 17–29, 1967
- Venues: Old Town Theater, Los Gatos, California
- Genre: Jazz
- Length: 74:19
- Label: V.A.G. Publishing
- Producer: David Guaraldi

Vince Guaraldi chronology
Peanuts Portraits (2010)	An Afternoon with the Vince Guaraldi Quartet (2011)	The Very Best of Vince Guaraldi (2012)

Professional ratings
Review scores
Source	Rating
Five Cents Please	5/5 stars

An Afternoon with the Vince Guaraldi Quartet is a live performance double CD by American jazz pianist Vince Guaraldi (credited to the Vince Guaraldi Quartet), released on November 24, 2011, by V.A.G. Publishing. It was the final album compiled and produced by Guaraldi's son, David, prior to his death in September 2026.

== Background ==
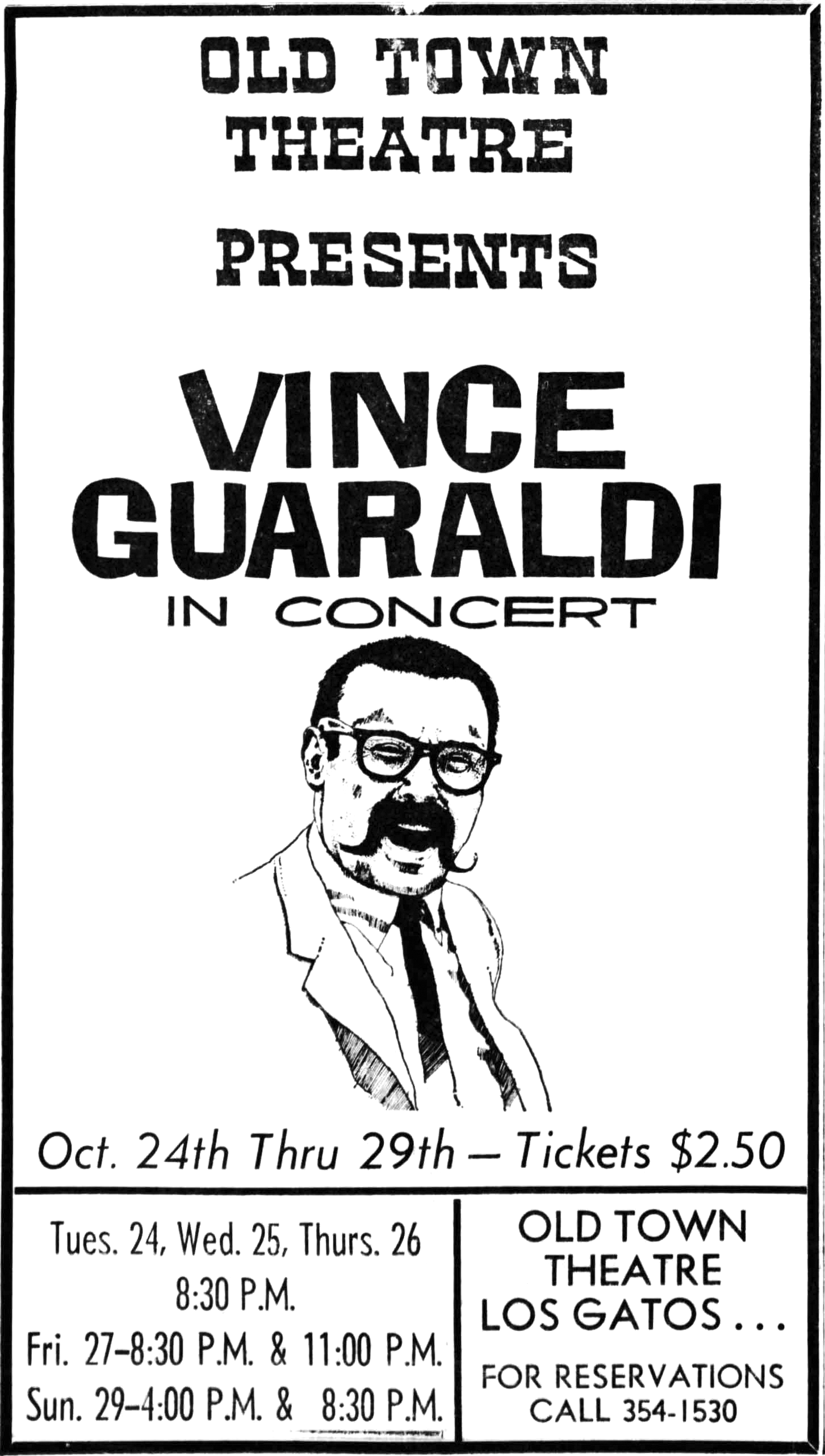
Advertisement for Guaraldi's two-week performance engagement at the Old Town Theater, published in The Spartan Daily, October 24, 1967

Sometime after composing the soundtrack for the Peanuts television special You're in Love, Charlie Brown, Guaraldi accepted a two-week performance engagement at the Old Town Theatre in Los Gatos, California. The tracks contained on An Afternoon with the Vince Guaraldi Quartet were recorded during several of those performances, which took place on October 17–29, 1967.

It was soon after these performances that Guaraldi veered away from traditional jazz and began experimenting with electronic keyboards that Guaraldi historian Derrick Bang described as a "fusion-laced detour" resulting in albums like The Eclectic Vince Guaraldi (1969).

== Track listing ==
All tracks are written by Vince Guaraldi except where noted.

Disc One
No.	Title	Writer(s)	Length
1.	"Ode to Billie Joe"	Bobbie Gentry	8:49
2.	"Goin' Out of My Head"	Teddy Randazzo; Bobby Weinstein	10:26
3.	"Eleanor Rigby"	John Lennon; Paul McCartney	8:16
4.	"Nobody Else"		9:16
Total length:			36:47

Disc Two
No.	Title	Writer(s)	Length
5.	"Theme From Exodus"	Ernest Gold	7:04
6.	"Linus and Lucy"		3:56
7.	"Once I Loved"	Antônio Carlos Jobim; Vinícius de Moraes	10:20
8.	"Sunny Goodge Street" (mistitled "Autumn Leaves")	Donovan Leitch	8:02
9.	"Cast Your Fate to the Wind"		8:10
Total length:			37:32

== Personnel ==
Vince Guaraldi Quartet

- Vince Guaraldi – piano, keyboards
- Eddie Duran – guitar
- Andy Acosta – electric bass
- Al Coster – drums

== See also ==
- Vince Guaraldi discography
- List of songs recorded by Vince Guaraldi
- List of cover versions of Vince Guaraldi songs
- Lee Mendelson Film Productions
