= Dee Bell =

American jazz singer

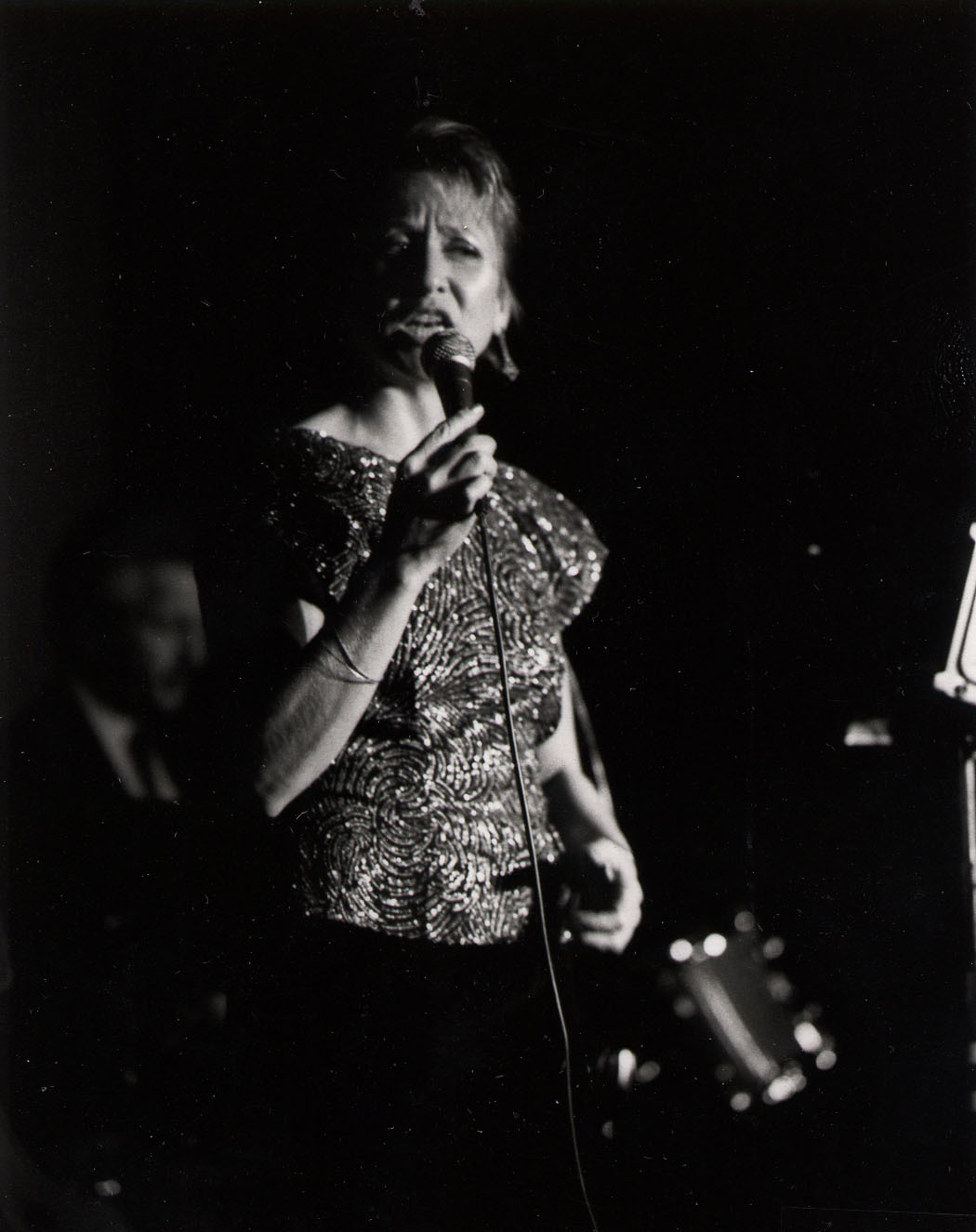

Background information
- Born: July 16, 1950 (age 75); Fort Wayne, Indiana, U.S.
- Genres: Jazz
- Occupation: Singer
- Years active: 1980s–present
- Labels: Concord Jazz, Laser Records
- Website: deebell.net

Dee Bell (born July 16, 1950) is an American jazz singer.

== Personal life ==
Bell grew up in a musical family and began playing music at home. She played clarinet in the Plainfield High School band and performed in an a cappella trio from age ten through her last year of high school. She graduated from Indiana University in December 1972, lived on the edge of the Hoosier National Forest in a two-room cabin with a woodstove for heat, and was co-founder and head chef of the Earth Kitchen vegetarian restaurant in Bloomington, Indiana.

== Career ==
In the late 1970s, Bell moved to California and worked at a restaurant in Sausalito. While singing "Happy Birthday" to a customer, she was heard by jazz guitarist Eddie Duran, and he invited her to sing with his band. They made a demo tape which became her first album, Let There Be Love (Concord Jazz), recorded with Duran and Stan Getz. They recorded another album for Concord Jazz, this time with Tom Harrell.

Bell recorded a third album, Sagacious Grace in 1990 with Houston Person and John Stowell, but technical problems during recording kept the album from being released. She left the music business and became a grade school music teacher in Mill Valley. In 2011 audio engineers fixed the problems with Sagacious Grace and the album was released by Laser Records. It reached No. 31 on the JazzWeek radio chart.

After the death of her musical director, Al Plank, Dee met Marcos Silva backstage after she performed a Marcos Valle song, The Face I Love at the same tribute to Merrilee Trost where Marcos played. They merged her swing style with his command of Brazilian rhythms and performed the belated CD release of Sagacious Grace at the Throckmorton Theatre mentioned above. They followed this performance with three CDs on the Laser Records label. Silva.Bell.Elation[2014], Lins, Lennox, & Life[2018], and Love for Sailin' Over Seas: Then & Now[2022].

Bell has written lyrics with permission and copyrights to Billy Strayhorn's Isfahan, Jimmy Rowles The Peacocks, Don Sebesky's You Can't Go Home Again You_Can't_Go_Home_Again_(album), and Ivan Lins', Acaso [By Chance], Depois dos Temporais [After the Storm], and Choros das Aguas [Crying of the Waters].

== Awards and honors ==
Let There Be Love was chosen as a Billboard magazine Recommended LP Jazz Pick in their March 26, 1983 issue. Bell was nominated by Down Beat in their Jazz Critics' Poll of 1984 and 1985 as Talent Deserving Wider Recognition. BAM magazine nominated Let There Be Love as the Best Debut Album in their 1983 Awards.

== Discography ==
- Let There Be Love with Eddie Duran and Stan Getz (Concord Jazz, 1983)
- One by One with Eddie Duran (Concord Jazz, 1985)
- Sagacious Grace (Laser, 2011)
- Silva Bell Elation with Marcos Silva (Laser, 2014)
- Lins, Lennox, & Life with Marcos Silva, Erik Jekabson (Laser, 2018)
- Love for Sailin' Over Seas: Then & Now with Marcos Silva, Romero Lubambo, (Laser, 2022)
