= Vince Guaraldi and the Lost Cues from the Charlie Brown Television Specials, Volume 2 =

Compilation album by Vince Guaraldi
- Released: February 6, 2008
- Recorded: 1972–1975
- Genres: Jazz; soundtrack
- Length: 30:21
- Labels: D & D
- Producer: David Guaraldi

Vince Guaraldi chronology
Vince Guaraldi and the Lost Cues from the Charlie Brown Television Specials (2007)	Vince Guaraldi and the Lost Cues from the Charlie Brown Television Specials, Volume 2 (2008)	Live on the Air (2008)

Professional ratings
Review scores
Source	Rating
Five Cents Please	4/5 stars

Vince Guaraldi and the Lost Cues from the Charlie Brown Television Specials, Volume 2 is a compilation soundtrack album by Vince Guaraldi released by D & D Records (Guaraldi's label) in 2008. The album is a follow-up to the 2007 release, Vince Guaraldi and the Lost Cues from the Charlie Brown Television Specials, which consisted of previously unreleased music cues featured on several Peanuts television specials produced in the 1970s.

== Background ==
In the mid-2000s, Dave Guaraldi discovered recordings from seven 1970s-era Peanuts television specials composed by his father, Vince Guaraldi. He curated select tracks to compile the first of two volumes of previously unreleased musical cues, sourced from his father's personal recording session reel-to-reel tapes.

Dave collaborated with sound engineer Michael Graves at Osiris Studio in Atlanta, Georgia, to restore and remaster the recordings for release.

The songs chosen for this volume were featured in the following Peanuts television specials:

- You're Not Elected, Charlie Brown (1972)
- A Charlie Brown Thanksgiving (1973)
- It's a Mystery, Charlie Brown (1974)
- It's the Easter Beagle, Charlie Brown (1974)
- Be My Valentine, Charlie Brown (1975)

== Reception and notability ==
Sound Insights author Doug Payne noted that the release of Vince Guaraldi and the Lost Cues from the Charlie Brown Television Specials was notable due to the fact that almost none of Guaraldi's Peanuts soundtrack work was made available for public consumption. Despite scoring 16 Peanuts television specials and one feature film, only two official soundtracks were released during Guaraldi's lifetime: Jazz Impressions of A Boy Named Charlie Brown (an unaired television documentary) and A Charlie Brown Christmas. Vince Guaraldi and the Lost Cues from the Charlie Brown Television Specials did much to fill a significant gap in this respect.

Chris Holmes of the nostalgia-themed website grayflannelsuit.net commented that "although some songs are quite brief, they paint a good picture of Guaraldi’s music near the end of his life; whimsical, funky, and always impeccably performed."

T. Ballard Lesemann of the Charleston City Paper called "Little Birdie" the "best Thanksgiving theme," commenting the "anti-worry/positive sentiment and snuffy singing style somehow matches the vibe of the season. Guaraldi sings lead, just barely in front of a great-sounding brass section and some funky electric piano."

== Track listing ==
Numerous errors were made with respect to incorrect/misspelled titles, running times and song order. Proper titles and song lengths appear with incorrectly titled tracks in parentheses.

All tracks are written by Vince Guaraldi, except where noted.

No.	Title	Writer(s)	Television special	Length
1.	"Kitchen Music" (mistitled/misspelled "Snoppy and Woodstock")		It's the Easter Beagle, Charlie Brown	1:43
2.	"Snoopy and Woodstock" (mistitled "Woodstock's Dream")		It's the Easter Beagle, Charlie Brown	2:11
3.	"Never Again" (mistitled "Bus Me"^{[a]})		Be My Valentine, Charlie Brown	1:34
4.	"Heartburn Waltz" (mistitled "Never Again")		Be My Valentine, Charlie Brown	2:00
5.	"Charlie Brown's Wake-Up" (mistitled "Heartburn Waltz")		Be My Valentine, Charlie Brown	1:30
6.	"There's Been a Change^{[b]}" (alternate)		Be My Valentine, Charlie Brown	1:34
7.	"Little Birdie (instrumental)" (mistitled "Charlie Brown's Wake-Up")		It's a Mystery, Charlie Brown	1:56
8.	"Cops and Robbers" (mistitled "Little Birdie" (instrumental))		It's a Mystery, Charlie Brown	1:43
9.	"Sally's Blues" (mistitled "Cops and Robbers")		It's a Mystery, Charlie Brown	1:41
10.	"It's a Mystery, Charlie Brown" (mistitled "Sally's Blues")		It's a Mystery, Charlie Brown	2:05
11.	"Is It James or Charlie?" (mistitled "It's a Mystery, Charlie Brown")		A Charlie Brown Thanksgiving	2:22
12.	"Oh, Good Grief" (mistitled "Is It James or Charlie?")	Vince Guaraldi; Lee Mendelson	You're Not Elected, Charlie Brown	1:06
13.	"Linus and Lucy"		You're Not Elected, Charlie Brown	1:20
14.	"Joe Cool" (whistling instrumental with brass)		It's a Mystery, Charlie Brown	3:01
15.	"Nobody Else^{[c]}" (misspelled "No Body Else")		alternate take, minus orchestral overdubs; never featured in a Peanuts special; originally released on The Eclectic Vince Guaraldi (1969)	4:35
Total length:				30:21

Notes

- ^{^[a]}"Bus Me," originally featured in There's No Time for Love, Charlie Brown, does not appear on the album despite being listed as Track 3.
- ^{^[b]}"There's Been a Change" (Track 6) is an alternate version than that featured in Be My Valentine, Charlie Brown.
- ^{^[c]}"Nobody Else" (Track 15) is a CD/iTunes bonus track.

== Personnel ==
All songs recorded at Wally Heider Studios, San Francisco, California (except "Nobody Else").

You're Not Elected, Charlie Brown – Vince Guaraldi Sextet
Recorded on August 22, 1972

- Vince Guaraldi – acoustic piano, electric keyboards, guitars, vocals
- Seward McCain – electric bass
- Glenn Cronkhite – drums
- Tom Harrell – trumpet
- Pat O'Hara – trombone
- Mel Martin – woodwinds

A Charlie Brown Thanksgiving – Vince Guaraldi Quintet
Recorded on August 20, 22, September 4, and October 1, 1973

- Vince Guaraldi – acoustic piano, electric keyboards, vocals, guitars
- Seward McCain – electric bass
- Tom Harrell – trumpet
- Chuck Bennett – trombone
- Mike Clark – drums

It's a Mystery, Charlie Brown – Vince Guaraldi Quartet
Recorded on December 14, 16-19, 1973 and January 23, 1974

- Vince Guaraldi – acoustic piano, electric keyboards, guitars
- Seward McCain – electric bass
- Tom Harrell – trumpet
- Eliot Zigmund – drums
- Mike Clark – drums

It's the Easter Beagle, Charlie Brown – Vince Guaraldi Quartet
Recorded on January 30 and March 1, 1974

- Vince Guaraldi – acoustic piano, electric keyboards, guitars
- Seward McCain – electric bass
- Robert Claire - flute
- Eliot Zigmund – drums
- Glenn Cronkhite - drums

Be My Valentine, Charlie Brown – Vince Guaraldi Trio
Recorded on December 9, 17, 18, 23, and 30, 1974

- Vince Guaraldi – acoustic piano, electric keyboards, guitars
- Seward McCain – electric bass
- Vince Lateano – drums

== See also ==
- Vince Guaraldi discography
- List of songs recorded by Vince Guaraldi
- List of cover versions of Vince Guaraldi songs
- Lee Mendelson Film Productions
