= The Charlie Brown Suite & Other Favorites =

Compilation album by Vince Guaraldi
- Released: August 19, 2003
- Recorded: 1968–1973
- Venues: Mr. D's, San Francisco, California (The Charlie Brown Suite)
- Studios: Wally Heider Studios, San Francisco, California
- Genre: Jazz
- Length: 52:35
- Labels: RCA/Bluebird; BMG Music
- Producer: Dawn Atkinson

Vince Guaraldi chronology
Jazz Casual: Paul Winter/Bola Sete and Vince Guaraldi (2001)	The Charlie Brown Suite & Other Favorites (2003)	Oaxaca (2004)

Professional ratings
Review scores
Source	Rating
AllMusic	4.5/5 stars
All About Jazz	5/5 stars
Five Cents Please	4/5 stars

The Charlie Brown Suite & Other Favorites is a 2003 compilation album by jazz pianist Vince Guaraldi released by RCA/Bluebird Records. The album is a mix of previously released material, newly discovered studio recordings, plus an archived 1969 live concert recording entitled The Charlie Brown Suite.

== Background ==
The Charlie Brown Suite & Other Favorites is the result of efforts made by Vince Guaraldi's son, David, to secure the rights needed to distribute some of his father's previously unreleased material.

The centerpiece selection is the orchestrated, 40-minute Charlie Brown Suite, originally taped live on a reel-to-reel audio tape recording device on May 18, 1969, during a benefit performance at Mr. D's, a theater/restaurant in San Francisco's North Beach region. The orchestral accompaniment was performed by chamber ensemble Amici Della Musica, under the direction of Welsh conductor Richard Williams.

The archived recording was acquired from Guaraldi's ex-wife, Shirley, by New Age pianist George Winston. A lifelong Guaraldi fan, Winston ultimately provided David Guaraldi with the concert recording, who, along with producer Dawn Atkinson, assembled the tapes for remastering and "sweetening" to make the concert more presentable for a mainstream release. The suite itself is divided into seven separate movements, connecting the Peanuts songs into an integrated whole.

The release also features a big band rendition of "Linus and Lucy" that was included on the 1973 holiday television special A Charlie Brown Thanksgiving. Also included is an undated live nightclub recording of Guaraldi's non-Peanuts signature tune, "Cast Your Fate to the Wind".

== Cover art ==
The cover art is a modified replica originally used for the 1964 release Jazz Impressions of A Boy Named Charlie Brown with a head shot of Guaraldi replaced by a caricature interpretation.

== Critical reception ==
Despite the wealth of material Guaraldi recorded for the Peanuts television specials, only three albums were commercially released during his lifetime: Jazz Impressions of A Boy Named Charlie Brown (1964), A Charlie Brown Christmas (1965) and Oh Good Grief! (1968). Charlie Brown's Holiday Hits (1998) was the first new posthumous compilation of previously unavailable material, released over two decades after Guaraldi's premature death. The Charlie Brown Suite & Other Favorites became the second posthumous release, providing a different interpretation of Guaraldi's ubiquitous Peanuts songs.

Guaraldi historian Derrick Bang commented that the arrangement "skillfully weaves half a dozen songs into an integrated whole." AllMusic critic Thom Jurek said, "the seemingly simple harmonics and snappy melodies that comprised the Charlie Brown pieces are merely the springboard for dizzying, dreamy, and rhythmically advanced, sophisticated composition and arrangement," adding that the suite contains "great treasures in American music and haunted by childlike nursery rhymes while being saturated in jazz; they comprise something unique in the vernacular and are a sheer, warm delight for virtually anyone but the most snobbish and harmonically challenged to listen to."

Billboard commented that "Charles M. Schulz's celebrated characters are brought to life in Guaraldi's orchestral arrangements, to which he contributes his own sublime meditations on Charlie Brown, Linus and the gang. Guaraldi's musicianship is top-notch. He leads the ensemble through a rocking 'Peppermint Patty,' pounding a bassline with his left hand while dashing off boogie-style runs with his right. Conversely, the delicate 'Rain, Rain Go Away' and 'The Charlie Brown Theme' ['Oh, Good Grief!'] are pretty, almost melancholy contemplations."

== Track listing ==
Mistitled tracks appear in parentheses along with their proper titles.

All tracks are written by Vince Guaraldi, except where noted.

No.	Title	Writer(s)	Notes	Length
1.	"Linus and Lucy" (with full band)		previously unreleased; appeared in A Charlie Brown Thanksgiving (1973)	5:55
2.	"Oh, Good Grief" (mistitled "The Charlie Brown Theme")	Vince Guaraldi; Lee Mendelson	previously released on Oh Good Grief! (1968)	2:38

The Charlie Brown Suite – May 18, 1969
No.	Title	Writer(s)	Notes	Length
3.	"Intro with Linus and Lucy"		preceded by "A-Tisket, A-Tasket"	8:13
4.	"The Great Pumpkin Waltz" (mistitled "Happiness Is")			5:49
5.	"Peppermint Patty"			5:52
6.	"Oh, Good Grief" (mistitled "The Charlie Brown Theme")	Vince Guaraldi; Lee Mendelson		5:37
7.	"Rain, Rain, Go Away"			4:58
8.	"Red Baron"			5:57
9.	"Closing"			2:36

No.	Title	Notes	Length
10.	"Cast Your Fate to the Wind" (live)	date and location unknown	6:42
Total length:			52:35

== Personnel ==
=== "Linus and Lucy" (with full band) ===
Vince Guaraldi Quintet Recorded on August 20, 22, September 4, and October 1, 1973

- Vince Guaraldi – acoustic piano, electric keyboards
- Seward McCain – electric bass
- Tom Harrell – trumpet
- Chuck Bennett – trombone
- Mike Clark – drums

=== "Oh Good Grief!" ===
Vince Guaraldi Quartet Recorded on March 22, 1968

- Vince Guaraldi – piano, electric harpsichord
- Eddie Duran – guitar
- Stanley Gilbert – double bass
- Carl Burnett – drums

=== The Charlie Brown Suite ===
Vince Guaraldi Trio Recorded on May 18, 1969

- Vince Guaraldi – piano
- Peter Marshall – electric bass
- Bob Belanski – drums

with

- Amici Della Musica – orchestral accompaniment
- Richard Williams – conductor

=== "Cast Your Fate to the Wind" (live) ===
Vince Guaraldi Quartet

- Vince Guaraldi – piano
- Eddie Duran – guitar
- Fred Marshall – electric bass
- John Waller – drums

=== Additional ===
- David Guaraldi – producer, liner notes
- Dawn Atkinson – producer
- Lee Mendelson – liner notes
- Bernie Grundman – mastering
- Charles M. Schulz – cover illustration

== See also ==
- Vince Guaraldi discography
- List of songs recorded by Vince Guaraldi
- List of cover versions of Vince Guaraldi songs
- Lee Mendelson Film Productions
