= Reunion with Chet Baker =

Studio album by Gerry Mulligan and Chet Baker
- Released: 1958
- Recorded: December 3, 11 & 17, 1957
- Studio: Coastal Studios, New York City
- Genre: Jazz
- Length: 67:07
- Label: World Pacific
- Producer: Richard Bock

Chet Baker chronology
| Theme Music from "The James Dean Story" (1956) | Reunion with Chet Baker (1958) | Embraceable You (1957) |

Gerry Mulligan chronology
| The Gerry Mulligan Songbook (1957) | Reunion with Chet Baker (1957) | I Want to Live (1958) |

Reunion with Chet Baker is an album recorded in 1957 by saxophonist Gerry Mulligan's Quartet with trumpeter Chet Baker which was released by World Pacific. It was Baker's first recording after moving to New York City.

== Reception ==
Professional ratings
Review scores
| Source | Rating |
|---|---|
| Allmusic | 4/5 stars |
| The Penguin Guide to Jazz Recordings | 3/4 stars |

Scott Yanow of Allmusic states, "The Gerry Mulligan Quartet of 1952-53 was one of the best-loved jazz groups of the decade and it made stars out of both the leader and trumpeter Chet Baker... Although not quite possessing the magic of the earlier group, the music is quite enjoyable and the interplay between the two horns is still special".

== Track listing ==
1. "Reunion" (Gerry Mulligan) - 4:03
2. "When Your Lover Has Gone" (Einar Aaron Swan) - 5:05
3. "Stardust" (Hoagy Carmichael, Mitchell Parish) - 4:42
4. "My Heart Belongs to Daddy" (Cole Porter) - 4:11
5. "Jersey Bounce" (Tiny Bradshaw, Buddy Feyne, Eddie Johnson, Bobby Plater) - 4:25
6. "The Surrey With the Fringe on Top" (Oscar Hammerstein II, Richard Rodgers) - 4:40
7. "Trav'lin' Light" (Johnny Mercer, Jimmy Mundy, Trummy Young) - 3:40
8. "Trav'lin' Light" [Alternate Take] (Mercer, Mundy, Young) - 4:30 Bonus track on CD reissue
9. "Ornithology" (Benny Harris, Charlie Parker) - 5:11
10. "People Will Say We're in Love" (Hammerstein, Rodgers) - 3:40 Bonus track on CD reissue
11. "The Song Is You" (Hammerstein, Jerome Kern) - 3:20 Bonus track on CD reissue
12. "Gee, Baby, Ain't I Good to You" (Andy Razaf, Don Redman) - 3:30 Bonus track on CD reissue
13. "Gee Baby, Ain't I Good to You" [Alternate Take] (Razaf, Redman) - 3:30 Bonus track on CD reissue
14. "I Got Rhythm" (George Gershwin, Ira Gershwin) - 5:57 Bonus track on CD reissue
15. "All the Things You Are (Hammerstein, Kern) - 6:43 Bonus track on CD reissue

== Personnel ==
- Chet Baker – trumpet
- Gerry Mulligan – baritone saxophone
- Henry Grimes – double bass
- Dave Bailey – drums
