= Vince Guaraldi and the Lost Cues from the Charlie Brown Television Specials =

Compilation album by Vince Guaraldi
- Released: June 15, 2007
- Recorded: 1972–1975
- Genres: Jazz; soundtrack
- Length: 39:05
- Labels: D & D
- Producer: David Guaraldi

Vince Guaraldi chronology
| North Beach (2006) | Vince Guaraldi and the Lost Cues from the Charlie Brown Television Specials (2007) | Vince Guaraldi and the Lost Cues from the Charlie Brown Television Specials, Volume 2 (2008) |

Professional ratings
Review scores
| Source | Rating |
|---|---|
| Five Cents Please | 4/5 stars |

Vince Guaraldi and the Lost Cues from the Charlie Brown Television Specials is a compilation soundtrack album by Vince Guaraldi released by D & D Records (Guaraldi’s label) in 2007. The album consists of select music cues featured on several Peanuts television specials produced between 1972 and 1975.

== Background ==
In the mid-2000s, Dave Guaraldi discovered recordings from seven 1970s-era Peanuts television specials composed by his father, Vince Guaraldi. He curated select tracks to compile the first of two volumes of previously unreleased musical cues, sourced from his father's personal recording session reel-to-reel tapes.

Dave collaborated with sound engineer Michael Graves at Osiris Studio in Atlanta, Georgia, to restore and remaster the recordings for release.

The songs chosen for this volume were featured in the following Peanuts television specials:

- You're Not Elected, Charlie Brown (1972)
- There's No Time for Love, Charlie Brown (1973)
- A Charlie Brown Thanksgiving (1973)
- It's a Mystery, Charlie Brown (1974)
- You're a Good Sport, Charlie Brown (1975)

== Reception and notability ==
Sound Insights author Doug Payne noted that the release of Vince Guaraldi and the Lost Cues from the Charlie Brown Television Specials was notable due to the fact that almost none of Guaraldi's Peanuts soundtrack work was made available for public consumption. Despite scoring 16 Peanuts television specials and one feature film, only two official soundtracks were released during Guaraldi's lifetime: Jazz Impressions of A Boy Named Charlie Brown (an unaired television documentary) and A Charlie Brown Christmas. Vince Guaraldi and the Lost Cues from the Charlie Brown Television Specials did much to fill a significant gap in this respect.

Chris Holmes of the nostalgia-themed website grayflannelsuit.net commented that "although some songs are quite brief, they paint a good picture of Guaraldi’s music near the end of his life; whimsical, funky, and always impeccably performed."

T. Ballard Lesemann of the Charleston City Paper called "Little Birdie" the "best Thanksgiving theme," commenting the "anti-worry/positive sentiment and snuffy singing style somehow matches the vibe of the season. Guaraldi sings lead, just barely in front of a great-sounding brass section and some funky electric piano."

== Track listing ==
All songs composed by Vince Guaraldi.

| No. | Title | Television special | Length |
|---|---|---|---|
| 1. | "Little Birdie" (vocal) | A Charlie Brown Thanksgiving | 3:18 |
| 2. | "Play It Again, Charlie Brown" (aka "Charlie Brown’s Blues"/"Charlie's Blues") | There's No Time for Love, Charlie Brown | 3:22 |
| 3. | "You're a Good Sport, Charlie Brown" ("Centercourt") | You're a Good Sport, Charlie Brown | 3:59 |
| 4. | "Motocross" | You're a Good Sport, Charlie Brown | 3:54 |
| 5. | "Peppermint Patty" | ^{[a]} | 1:35 |
| 6. | "Incumbent Waltz" | You're Not Elected, Charlie Brown | 1:52 |
| 7. | "African Sleigh Ride" | There's No Time for Love, Charlie Brown | 1:36 |
| 8. | "There's No Time for Love, Charlie Brown" | There's No Time for Love, Charlie Brown | 2:39 |
| 9. | "Thanksgiving Theme" | A Charlie Brown Thanksgiving | 2:03 |
| 10. | "Joe Cool^{[b]}" (vocal) | You're Not Elected, Charlie Brown/There's No Time for Love, Charlie Brown/It's a Mystery, Charlie Brown | 2:42 |
| 11. | "Pitkin County Blues" | There's No Time for Love, Charlie Brown | 6:58 |
| 12. | "Joe Cool^{[c]}" (instrumental) | You're Not Elected, Charlie Brown | 5:05 |
| Total length: | | | 39:05 |

Notes

- ^{^[a]} Liner notes erroneously state that "Peppermint Patty" (Track 5) was featured in A Charlie Brown Thanksgiving; this version did not appear in any Peanuts television special.
- ^{^[b]} The vocal version of "Joe Cool" is a composite of three separate recordings from different specials.
- ^{^[c]} This track was reissued in 2024 on You're Not Elected, Charlie Brown: Original Soundtrack Recording, with the original vocal track reinstated.

== Personnel ==
All songs recorded at Wally Heider Studios, San Francisco, California.

You're Not Elected, Charlie Brown – Vince Guaraldi Sextet
Recorded on August 22, 1972

- Vince Guaraldi – acoustic piano, electric keyboards, guitars, vocals
- Seward McCain – electric bass, flute
- Glenn Cronkhite – drums
- Tom Harrell – trumpet
- Pat O'Hara – trombone
- Mel Martin – woodwinds

There's No Time for Love, Charlie Brown – Vince Guaraldi Quintet
Recorded on January 15, February 22 and 26, 1973

- Vince Guaraldi – acoustic piano, electric keyboards, guitars, vocals
- Seward McCain – electric bass
- Tom Harrell – trumpet
- Pat O'Hara – flute
- Glenn Cronkhite – drums

A Charlie Brown Thanksgiving – Vince Guaraldi Quintet
Recorded on August 20, 22, September 4, and October 1, 1973

- Vince Guaraldi – acoustic piano, electric keyboards, vocals, guitars
- Seward McCain – electric bass
- Tom Harrell – trumpet
- Chuck Bennett – trombone
- Mike Clark – drums

It's a Mystery, Charlie Brown – Vince Guaraldi Quartet
Recorded on December 14, 16-19, 1973 and January 23, 1974

- Vince Guaraldi – acoustic piano, electric keyboards, guitars
- Seward McCain – electric bass
- Tom Harrell – trumpet
- Eliot Zigmund – drums
- Mike Clark – drums

You're a Good Sport, Charlie Brown – Vince Guaraldi Trio
Recorded on September 12, 18 and 19, 1975

- Vince Guaraldi – acoustic piano, electric keyboards, Minimoog/ARP String Ensemble synthesizers
- Seward McCain – electric bass
- Mark Rosengarden – drums

== See also ==
- Vince Guaraldi discography
- List of songs recorded by Vince Guaraldi
- List of cover versions of Vince Guaraldi songs
- Lee Mendelson Film Productions
