= Cal Tjader-Stan Getz Sextet =

Studio album by Cal Tjader-Stan Getz Sextet
- Released: 1958
- Recorded: February 8, 1958; San Francisco, CA
- Studio: Circle Record Studios
- Genre: Jazz
- Length: 42:33
- Labels: Fantasy; LP 3266

Stan Getz chronology
Stan Getz and J. J. Johnson at the Opera House (1957)	Cal Tjader-Stan Getz Sextet (1958)	Stan Meets Chet (1958)

Cal Tjader chronology
Cal Tjader (1957)	Cal Tjader-Stan Getz Sextet (1958)	Cal Tjader's Latin Concert (1958)

Cal Tjader-Stan Getz Sextet is an album by vibraphonist Cal Tjader and saxophonist Stan Getz, recorded in 1958 and released on the Fantasy label.

== Reception ==
Professional ratings
Review scores
Source	Rating
AllMusic	4.5/5 stars
The Penguin Guide to Jazz Recordings	3/4 stars
The Rolling Stone Jazz Record Guide	2/5 stars

The AllMusic review awarded the album 4½ stars, calling it "a recommended title for both Getz and Tjader fans".

== Track listing ==
All compositions by Cal Tjader except where noted.

1. "I've Grown Accustomed to Her Face" (Frederick Loewe, Alan Jay Lerner) - 3:59
2. "For All We Know" (J. Fred Coots, Sam M. Lewis) - 5:45
3. "Ginza Samba" (Vince Guaraldi) - 10:57
4. "Crow's Nest" - 8:18
5. "Liz-Anne" - 3:47
6. "Big Bear" - 4:33
7. "My Buddy" (Walter Donaldson, Gus Kahn) - 5:14

== Personnel ==
- Cal Tjader - vibraphone
- Stan Getz - tenor saxophone
- Vince Guaraldi - piano
- Eddie Duran - guitar
- Scott LaFaro - bass
- Billy Higgins - drums
