= The Navy Swings =

Live album by Vince Guaraldi and Bola Sete
- Released: April 2010
- Recorded: May–June 1965
- Genres: Latin jazz; Bossa nova; Samba
- Length: 54:04
- Label: V.A.G. Publishing
- Producer: David Guaraldi

Vince Guaraldi chronology
The Definitive Vince Guaraldi (2009)	The Navy Swings (2010)	Peanuts Portraits (2010)

Bola Sete chronology
Windspell (2008)	The Navy Swings (2010)	The Kitchen Tapes (2014)

Professional ratings
Review scores
Source	Rating
Five Cents Please	4/5 stars

The Navy Swings is a live performance album by pianist Vince Guaraldi and guitarist Bola Sete, released in April 2010 by V.A.G. Publishing. The release contains four separate 15-minute Go Navy! The Navy Swings radio shows performed for the U.S. Navy during May and June 1965.

== Background ==
Go Navy! The Navy Swings was a weekly, jazz-themed, 15-minute public service radio show broadcast between 1957 and 1970. Hosting duties were split between George Fenneman, Jack Haskell and Don Wilson, each who introduced the weekly guests and allowed them to perform a short concert consisting of three or four songs. The performance then concluded with a message from a U.S. Navy recruiter. The Vince Guaraldi Trio and Bola Sete recorded four separate performances for the series.

== Track listing ==
Program One
No.	Title	Writer(s)	Performer	Length
1.	"The Navy Swings Title Theme and Introduction, Brief Chat"		Don Wilson, Vince Guaraldi Trio	0:56
2.	"Cast Your Fate to the Wind"	Vince Guaraldi	Vince Guaraldi Trio	3:11
3.	"Recruitment Public Service Announcement"		Don Wilson, Vince Guaraldi, Bola Sete	1:26
4.	"Choro"	Wolfgang Amadeus Mozart (uncredited); adapted by Vince Guaraldi	Vince Guaraldi Trio & Bola Sete	2:41
5.	"Chat, Recruitment Public Service Announcement"		Don Wilson, Vince Guaraldi Trio, Bola Sete	1:28
6.	"The Girl from Ipanema"	Antônio Carlos Jobim; Vinicius de Moraes	Vince Guaraldi Trio & Bola Sete	3:41
7.	"Chat"		Don Wilson, Vince Guaraldi	0:41

Program Two
No.	Title	Writer(s)	Performer	Length
8.	"Mr. Lucky"	Henry Mancini	Vince Guaraldi Trio	2:02
9.	"Recruitment Public Service Announcement, Chat"		Don Wilson, Bola Sete	1:13
10.	"Days of Wine and Roses"	Henry Mancini	Vince Guaraldi Trio & Bola Sete	2:48
11.	"Chat"		Don Wilson, Vince Guaraldi, Bola Sete	0:43
12.	"Limehouse Blues"	Philip Braham	Vince Guaraldi Trio	2:26
13.	"Recruitment Public Service Announcement"		Don Wilson, Vince Guaraldi	0:46
14.	"I Could Write a Book"	Richard Rodgers	Vince Guaraldi Trio	2:23
15.	"Chat"		Don Wilson, Vince Guaraldi, Bola Sete	0:43

Program Three
No.	Title	Writer(s)	Performer	Length
16.	"Samba de Orpheus"	Luiz Bonfá	Vince Guaraldi Trio & Bola Sete	3:29
17.	"Recruitment Public Service Announcement, Chat"		Don Wilson, Vince Guaraldi, Bola Sete	1:24
18.	"Star Song"	Vince Guaraldi; William Siden	Vince Guaraldi Trio & Bola Sete	3:41
19.	"Chat, Recruitment Public Service Announcement"		Don Wilson, Bola Sete	0:56
20.	"Valsa De Uma Cidade (Waltz of a City)"	Antônio Maria; Ismael Netto	Bola Sete with Tom Beeson and Lee Charlton	3:01
21.	"Chat"		Don Wilson, Vince Guaraldi	0:25

Program Four
No.	Title	Writer(s)	Performer	Length
22.	"What Kind of Fool Am I?"	Leslie Bricusse; Anthony Newley	Vince Guaraldi Trio & Bola Sete	2:47
23.	"Recruitment Public Service Announcement, Chat"		Don Wilson, Bola Sete	1:14
24.	"One-Note Samba"	Antônio Carlos Jobim	Bola Sete	2:18
25.	"Chat"		Don Wilson, Vince Guaraldi, Bola Sete	0:34
26.	"Lollipops and Roses"	Tony Velona	Vince Guaraldi Trio & Bola Sete	2:38
27.	"Recruitment Public Service Announcement"		Don Wilson, Vince Guaraldi	0:42
28.	"What Is This Thing Called Love?"	Cole Porter	Vince Guaraldi Trio & Bola Sete	2:20
29.	"Chat, The Navy Swings Closing Theme"		Don Wilson, Vince Guaraldi Trio	1:27
Total length:				54:04

== Personnel ==
Credits adapted from CD liner notes.

- Bola Sete – guitar
- Don Wilson – Master of Ceremonies

Vince Guaraldi Trio

- Vince Guaraldi – piano
- Tom Beeson – double bass
- Lee Charlton – drums

== See also ==
- Vince Guaraldi discography
- List of songs recorded by Vince Guaraldi
- List of cover versions of Vince Guaraldi songs
- Lee Mendelson Film Productions
