= Stan Meets Chet =

Studio album by Stan Getz and Chet Baker
- Released: 1958
- Recorded: February 16, 1958; Robert Jordan & Associates Recorders, Chicago
- Genre: Jazz
- Length: 50:18
- Label: Verve; MGV 8263
- Producer: Norman Granz

Chet Baker chronology
Embraceable You (1957)	Stan Meets Chet (1958)	(Chet Baker Sings) It Could Happen to You (1958)

Stan Getz chronology
Cal Tjader-Stan Getz Sextet (1958)	Stan Meets Chet (1958)	Imported from Europe (1958)

Stan Meets Chet is an album by saxophonist Stan Getz with trumpeter Chet Baker, released in 1958 on the Verve label.

== Reception ==
Professional ratings
Review scores
Source	Rating
AllMusic	3/5 stars
The Penguin Guide to Jazz Recordings	3/4 stars

Scott Yanow of AllMusic stated: "Tenor saxophonist Stan Getz and trumpeter Chet Baker never particularly liked each other and, even though they had musically compatible styles, they only worked together briefly in three periods. Their mutual hostility can be felt in subtle ways on this session ... even with some good moments, does not live up to its potential."

== Track listing ==
1. "I'll Remember April" (Gene de Paul, Patricia Johnston, Don Raye) - 12:24
2. "Autumn in New York/Embraceable You/What's New?" (Vernon Duke/George Gershwin, Ira Gershwin/Bob Haggart, Johnny Burke) - 14:34
3. "Jordu" (Duke Jordan) - 8:31
4. "Half-Breed Apache" (Ray Noble) - 14:49

== Personnel ==
- Chet Baker — trumpet - except track 3
- Stan Getz — tenor saxophone
- Jodie Christian - piano
- Victor Sproles - bass
- Marshall Thompson - drums
