= It's a Mystery, Charlie Brown =

1974 Peanuts animated television special

- Genre: Animation
- Based on: Peanuts by Charles M. Schulz
- Written by: Charles M. Schulz
- Directed by: Phil Roman
- Voices of: Todd Barbee; Melanie Kohn; Stephen Shea; Donna LeTourneau; Jimmy Ahrens; Lynn Mortensen; Tom Muller; Bill Melendez
- Music by: Vince Guaraldi
- Opening theme: "Mystery Theme"
- Ending theme: "Mystery Theme"
- Country of origin: United States

Production
- Executive producer: Lee Mendelson
- Producer: Bill Melendez
- Editor: Chuck McCann
- Running time: 25 minutes
- Production companies: Lee Mendelson Film Productions; Bill Melendez Productions

Original release
- Network: CBS
- Release: February 1, 1974

Related
- A Charlie Brown Thanksgiving (1973); It's the Easter Beagle, Charlie Brown (1974)

It's a Mystery, Charlie Brown is the 11th prime-time animated television special based upon the comic strip Peanuts, by Charles M. Schulz. It originally aired on the CBS network on February 1, 1974. This was the first Charlie Brown television special that Bill Melendez did not direct, but he still served as producer and provided the voices of Snoopy and Woodstock.

== Plot ==
Woodstock struggles to construct a secure nest on a tree branch, repeatedly failing to keep the straw intact. After several unsuccessful attempts, he ultimately devises a unique method of tying the materials together, resulting in a stable and structurally sound nest.

The following day, Woodstock discovers that the nest has mysteriously vanished. Distressed, he seeks assistance from Snoopy, who adopts the persona of Sherlock Holmes to investigate the disappearance. Together, they begin a series of visits to various neighborhood homes in pursuit of clues.

Their search leads them first to Charlie Brown, whom they awaken and interrogate, though he denies any involvement. At the Van Pelt household, they conduct an exaggerated dusting for fingerprints and find a broom straw, which Snoopy deems suspicious. However, Lucy rejects his accusation and physically ejects him from the premises. At Marcie's house, Snoopy attempts to question her, but she fails to understand him and shuts the door. A visit to Pig-Pen quickly results in his dismissal as a suspect due to his characteristically dusty appearance. Finally, Peppermint Patty mistakes Snoopy's investigation for a game of 'Cops and Robbers' and chases him through her house, prompting his retreat.

Returning to the site of the missing nest, Snoopy notices a trail of footprints leading away from the tree. He and Woodstock follow the trail to the local elementary school. Entering through an open window, they find the nest displayed under glass as part of a classroom science exhibit. They reclaim it and return it to its original location in the tree.

The next day, Sally informs Charlie Brown that her science project—a 'prehistoric bird's nest'—has been stolen. Charlie Brown realizes that Sally had unknowingly taken Woodstock's nest for her assignment. Despite being confronted, Sally insists that her discovery entitles her to keep it. To resolve the dispute, Charlie Brown suggests they consult Lucy, who temporarily transforms her psychiatric booth into a courtroom. She enlists Linus as the court stenographer and adds a surcharge to her standard fee to cover legal costs. Snoopy, acting as Woodstock's attorney, presents a legal brief filled with elaborate legalese jargon. Sally counters with a simple 'finders keepers' argument. Linus proves ineffective as a stenographer, recalling only a few opening words of the case. Nevertheless, Judge Lucy rules in favor of Woodstock, stating that because he built the nest, he is its rightful owner.

Though disappointed by the verdict and now lacking a science exhibit, Sally accepts an alternative proposal: Snoopy volunteers to participate in a live demonstration of Pavlov's classical conditioning experiment. Initially skeptical, Sally ultimately agrees. The project earns her an 'A'.

The story concludes with Woodstock resting on his restored nest, which promptly collapses beneath him, sending him tumbling to the ground once again.

== Voice cast ==
- Todd Barbee as Charlie Brown
- Melanie Kohn as Lucy van Pelt
- Stephen Shea as Linus van Pelt
- Donna LeTourneau as Peppermint Patty
- Jimmy Ahrens as Marcie
- Lynn Mortensen as Sally Brown
- Tom Muller as Pig-Pen
- Bill Melendez as Snoopy/Woodstock
- Peter Robbins as Lucy van Pelt and Peppermint Patty (screaming; archival audio)

== Soundtrack ==
The soundtrack for It's a Mystery, Charlie Brown was composed by Vince Guaraldi and conducted and arranged by John Scott Trotter. The score was recorded by the Vince Guaraldi Quartet on December 14, 16-19, 1973 and January 23, 1974 at Wally Heider Studios, featuring Guaraldi (piano, electric piano, electric harpsichord, electric guitar and whistling), Tom Harrell (trumpet), Seward McCain (electric bass), Mike Clark and Eliot Zigmund (drums).

In the mid-2000’s, recording session master tapes for seven 1970s-era Peanuts television specials scored by Guaraldi were discovered by his son, David. The songs "Little Birdie" (instrumental version), "It's a Mystery, Charlie Brown" (third reprise, school version), "Cops and Robbers," "Sally's Blues" and "Joe Cool" (instrumental "whistling" version with brass) were released in 2008 on the compilation album, Vince Guaraldi and the Lost Cues from the Charlie Brown Television Specials, Volume 2. A live version of "Cops and Robbers" was also recorded by Guaraldi on February 6, 1974, for a radio performance released on Live on the Air.

The complete original remastered recordings were officially released by Lee Mendelson Film Productions on September 18, 2026, presenting the full score and several previously unreleased tracks for the first time.

== Home media ==
This special was released on DVD for the first time, in remastered form as part of the DVD box set, Peanuts 1970's Collection, Volume One. Before that, it was released on RCA's SelectaVision CED format in 1983, and on VHS by Kartes Video Communications in 1987, and by Paramount on August 17, 1994 (as part of a sweepstakes contest with Travelodge), and a mass market release on October 1, 1996. The Paramount release is notable for fixing an animation error where Charlie Brown, Sally, and Snoopy are shown in mid-air by zooming in the footage.

On October 7, 2025, it was released on the DVD and Blu-Ray collection Peanuts: 75th Anniversary Ultimate TV Specials Collection along with 39 other Peanuts specials.
