= Richard Williams (conductor) =

Welsh conductor (1923–2007)

Richard Williams MBE (1923–2007) was a Welsh conductor.

== Biography ==
Richard Williams was recognised in the 1938 National Eisteddfod for his musical talent and at the age of 15 began touring with a troupe of singers around the music halls of the United Kingdom before returning home to join the fledgling Welsh National Opera.

His musical career ended when his baby son contracted meningitis, making him profoundly deaf and Richard, appalled by the facilities to help children with this condition, decided to educate his son himself.

With a part-time job selling insurance helping to keep the family going, he devoted the rest of his time to music and formed the Gentleman Songsters in 1951, followed by the Richard Williams Singers in 1965 and the Richard Williams Junior Singers in 1966.

Each achieved remarkable success, with frequent broadcasts, recording sessions and tours of Europe and North America. In total there were 24 overseas concert tours, performing in Moscow, Vienna, San Francisco, Los Angeles, Prague, Paris, Toronto and Vancouver.

They regularly performed before royalty and Richard Williams continued to train young singers at his Tonyrefail Music Centre and he has commonly seen three generations of singers pass from the nursery choir through to the adults.

At the age of 54 he qualified as a teacher and in 1977 was awarded the MBE for his services to music in the community. In 1993 the Open University in Wales honoured him with a Degree of Master of the University.

Williams died at his home in Thomastown, Rhondda Cynon Taf, South Wales, at the age of 84.
