= Live on the Air =

Live album by Vince Guaraldi
- Released: November 14, 2008
- Recorded: February 6, 1974
- Studios: Wally Heider Studios, San Francisco, California
- Genres: Jazz; funk
- Length: 80:04
- Labels: D & D
- Producer: David Guaraldi

Vince Guaraldi chronology
Vince Guaraldi and the Lost Cues from the Charlie Brown Television Specials, Volume 2 (2008)	Live on the Air (2008)	Essential Standards (2009)

Professional ratings
Review scores
Source	Rating
Five Cents Please	4/5 stars

Live on the Air is a live performance double CD by American jazz pianist Vince Guaraldi (credited to the Vince Guaraldi Trio), released November 14, 2008 through D & D Records (Guaraldi's label).

== Background ==
Live on the Air consists of a live performance recorded on February 6, 1974 (two years to the day before Guaraldi's premature death), at Wally Heider Studios in San Francisco, California. The performance was broadcast live by radio stations KPFA and KPFB. Tracks 1–8 were performed for the original broadcast. The sound engineer then advised Guaraldi and his trio to "play until your heart's content" (Track 9), resulting in three additional songs performed for the studio audience.

== Track listing ==
Numerous errors were made with respect to song titles and running times. Proper titles and song lengths appear with incorrectly titled tracks in parentheses.

All tracks are written by Vince Guaraldi, except where noted.

Disc One
No.	Title	Writer(s)	Length
1.	"Cabaret^{[a]}"	Fred Ebb; John Kander	7:39
2.	"If"	David Gates	8:14
3.	"Billie's Bounce" (mistitled "Now's the Time")	Charlie Parker	5:50
4.	"There's No Time for Love, Charlie Brown"		7:02
5.	"Old Folks" (mistitled "I Could Write a Book")	Willard Robison; Dedette Lee Hill	8:21

Disc Two
No.	Title	Writer(s)	Length
6.	"Eleanor Rigby" "Linus and Lucy^{[a]}"	John Lennon; Paul McCartney; ("Eleanor Rigby")	9:34
7.	"Woodstock's Pad" (mistitled "Then Came You")		6:02
8.	"Cast Your Fate to the Wind^{[a]}"		3:46
9.	"Play 'Til Your Hearts Content"		0:49
10.	"Cops and Robbers" (mistitled "Little Birdie")		7:18
11.	"One, Two, Three"	Len Barry; John Medora; David White	7:24
12.	"On Green Dolphin Street"	Bronisław Kaper; Ned Washington	8:05
Total length:			80:04

Notes

- ^{^[a]}"Cabaret", "Linus and Lucy" and "Cast Your Fate to the Wind" were previously released on North Beach (2006).

== Personnel ==
Credits adapted from CD liner notes.

Vince Guaraldi Trio

- Vince Guaraldi – piano, Fender Rhodes
- Seward McCain – electric bass
- Eliot Zigmund – drums

Additional

- Jesse Hayes – liner notes, artwork
- David Guaraldi – producer
- Michael Graves – engineer (audio restoration)
- Sienna Digital, Menlo Park, California – remastering

== See also ==
- Vince Guaraldi discography
- List of songs recorded by Vince Guaraldi
- List of cover versions of Vince Guaraldi songs
- Lee Mendelson Film Productions
