= Embraceable You (album) =

Studio album by Chet Baker
- Released: 1995
- Recorded: December 9, 1957; New York City
- Genre: Jazz
- Length: 38:42
- Label: Pacific Jazz; CDP 7243 8
- Producer: Richard Bock

Chet Baker chronology
Reunion with Chet Baker (1957)	Embraceable You (1995)	Stan Meets Chet (1958)

Embraceable You is an album by jazz trumpeter Chet Baker recorded in 1957 but not released on the Pacific Jazz label until 1995. One song, "Trav'lin' Light" was previously released on the album Pretty/Groovy in 1958 but all other tracks were previously unissued.

== Reception ==
Professional ratings
Review scores
Source	Rating
Allmusic	1.5/5 stars

Allmusic rated the album with 1½ stars stating "A ballad collection that emphasizes Chet Baker's troubled-romantic vocal style, it's not too surprising that these 1957 recordings remained in the vaults for almost 40 years... While it isn't the place to start, Embraceable You is a fascinating example of why Chet Baker's tragic spirit remains as attractive today as it was in his lifetime".

== Track listing ==
1. "The Night We Called It a Day" (Tom Adair, Matt Dennis) – 2:22
2. "Little Girl Blue" [Instrumental Version] (Lorenz Hart, Richard Rodgers) – 4:33
3. "Embraceable You" (George Gershwin, Ira Gershwin) – 2:06
4. "They All Laughed" (Gershwin, Gershwin) – 2:08
5. "There's a Lull in My Life" (Mack Gordon, Harry Revel) – 2:53
6. "What Is There to Say?" (Vernon Duke, Yip Harburg) – 3:38
7. "While My Lady Sleeps" (Gus Kahn, Bronisław Kaper) – 2:48
8. "Forgetful" (George Handy, Jack Segal) – 2:35
9. "How Long Has This Been Going On?" (Gershwin, Gershwin) – 2:46
10. "Come Rain or Come Shine" (Harold Arlen, Johnny Mercer) – 2:07
11. "On Green Dolphin Street" (Kaper, Ned Washington) – 3:07
12. "Little Girl Blue" [Vocal Version] (Hart, Rodgers) – 4:30
13. "Trav'lin' Light" (Mercer, Jimmy Mundy, Trummy Young) – 3:09

== Personnel ==
- Chet Baker – trumpet, vocals
- Dave Wheat – guitar
- Russ Savakus (listed as "Ross Savakus") – bass
