= Little Birdie (Vince Guaraldi song) =

1973 song by Vince Guaraldi

Song by Vince Guaraldi

from the album A Charlie Brown Thanksgiving: Original Soundtrack Recording
- Recorded: 1973
- Studio: Wally Heider Studios, San Francisco, California
- Genre: Jazz; Jazz-funk; Soundtrack
- Length: 3:13
- Composer: Vince Guaraldi
- Lyricist: Vince Guaraldi
- Producers: Jason Mendelson; Sean Mendelson

"Little Birdie" is a song written and performed by American jazz pianist Vince Guaraldi for the 1973 Peanuts television special A Charlie Brown Thanksgiving. The song features Guaraldi on lead vocals and is addressed to the character Woodstock. It is heard during a sequence in which Snoopy and Woodstock prepare Thanksgiving dinner for friends of Charlie Brown.

== Recording and composition ==
"Little Birdie" was recorded at Wally Heider Studios in San Francisco in 1973. Guaraldi was accompanied by bassist Seward McCain, drummer Mike Clark, trumpeter Tom Harrell and trombonist Chuck Bennett. John Scott Trotter served as orchestrator. The arrangement was recorded in the key of A-flat major, with a measured tempo of 88 beats per minute. It features a broken rhythm drumming style plus electric keyboards and brass accompaniment arranged by Harrell, whose muted trumpet responds to Guaraldi's vocal phrases.

The lyrics address Woodstock's flying habits and his friendship with Snoopy.

== Release and use in Peanuts specials ==
"Little Birdie" was first heard in A Charlie Brown Thanksgiving (1973) and commercially released on June 15, 2007, as the opening track of Vince Guaraldi and the Lost Cues from the Charlie Brown Television Specials. The 2023 A Charlie Brown Thanksgiving soundtrack featured an alternate vocal performance that was chosen due to the original television vocal recording suffering from noise and instrumental bleed.

An instrumental version was later used in It's a Mystery, Charlie Brown (1974), during a sequence in which Woodstock builds his nest.

== Critical reception ==
Reviewing the 2023 soundtrack for Pitchfork, Vanessa Ague identified "Little Birdie" as the album's high point, highlighting its funk rhythm as well as Guaraldi's singing and Harrell's muted trumpet. Jeff Cebulski of Chicago Jazz Magazine noted the blues-influenced brass accompaniment and Guaraldi's vocal performance. Writing for WRTI, jazz critic Nate Chinen compared Guaraldi's vocals on "Little Birdie" to those of Ray Charles. S. Victor Aaron of Something Else! Reviews praised Harrell's arrangement, while Jeff Elbel of Illinois Entertainer highlighted the song's R&B influences and Clavinet accompaniment.

== Cover versions ==
- Joe Williams recorded "Little Birdie" for Happy Anniversary, Charlie Brown! (1989), with a contemporary Billboard review singling out his performance as one of the album's highlights.
- Germaine Bazzle performed the song on Joe Cool's Blues (1995), recorded with a trio led by Ellis Marsalis Jr..
- George Winston performed a solo-piano medley of the song with "You're Elected, Charlie Brown" on Love Will Come: The Music of Vince Guaraldi, Volume 2 (2010).
- Pianist Isaiah J. Thompson recorded the composition with vocalist Tyreek McDole for A Guaraldi Holiday (2023).
