= Eddie Duran =

American jazz guitarist (1925–2019)

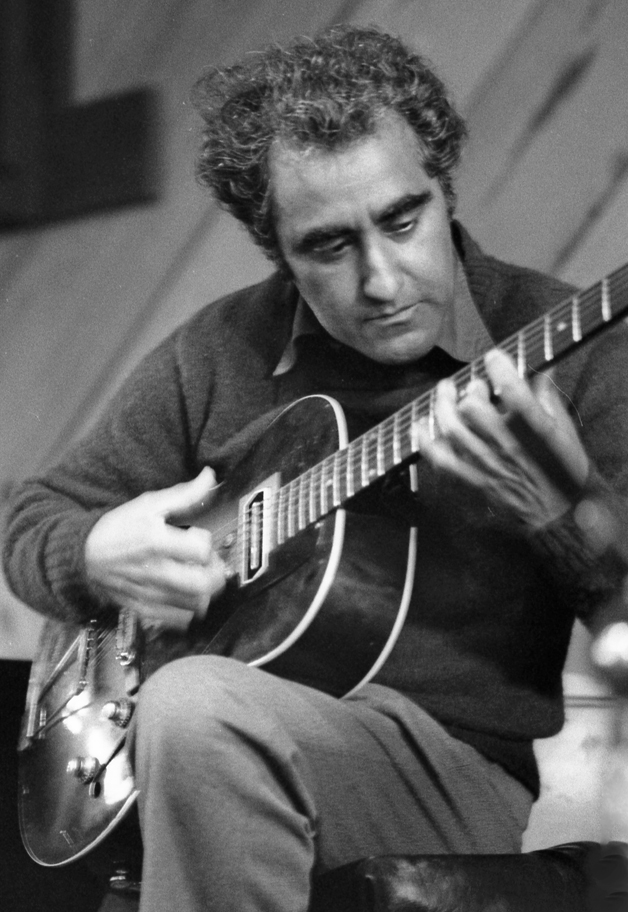
- Duran performing in Half Moon Bay, California, circa 1979

Background information
- Born: Edward Lozano Duran; September 6, 1925; San Francisco, California, U.S.
- Died: November 22, 2019 (aged 94) Sonoma, California, U.S.
- Genres: Jazz, pop
- Occupation: Musician
- Instrument: Guitar
- Years active: 1940–2019
- Labels: Concord Jazz, Fantasy, Milestone

Edward Lozano Duran (September 6, 1925 – November 22, 2019) was an American jazz guitarist from San Francisco. He recorded often with Vince Guaraldi and was a member of the Benny Goodman orchestra during the 1970s.

== Career ==
Duran started on piano at age seven and switched to guitar at 12. By fifteen he was performing professionally with jazz musicians who visited San Francisco in the 1940s and 1950s. He was in a trio with his brothers, Carlos Duran and Manny Duran, from 1948 to 1952. Beginning in the 1950s, he worked in San Francisco with Chet Baker, Charlie Parker, Red Norvo, George Shearing, and Flip Phillips.

Around 1957, Duran was the guitarist in the CBS Radio Orchestra under the direction of Ray Hackett for the Bill Weaver Show, (Note: Bill Weaver was the pseudonym of William Francis Ward (1920–1996)) a variety show broadcast by CBS's San Francisco affiliate, KQW, later renamed KCBS, from the Palace Hotel. (Note: Duran's tenure with the CBS Radio Orchestra at Palace Hotel is not precisely known. His engagement with the orchestra secured stable income as a performer and strengthened his proficiency as a straight-ahead player in a studio orchestra, a genre that Duran repeated in the late seventies with Benny Goodman.) While playing with the CBS Orchestra, Duran met Brunell and performed on her debut album, Intro to Jazz of the Italian-American. The album was recorded by San Francisco Jazz Records, a short-lived label that was part of the production of the radio station.

In 1954, his friend, Vince Guaraldi, who had been playing with Cal Tjader, started a trio with Duran and bassist Dean Riley. Guaraldi introduced Tjader to Duran and his two brothers. All three Duran brothers were members of Cal Tjader's Mambo Quintet in the mid 1950s.

In 1958, Duran recorded as part of the Cal Tjader-Stan Getz Sextet. According to Duran, "There was no rehearsal before the date, no alternates, no second takes. It went very smoothly. It just kind of fell into place. The feeling was happy and relaxed." Also in 1958, Duran was joined by Manny Duran on Tjader's album San Francisco Moods. Duran led a trio from 1960 to 1967. In 1962, he was joined by Carlos Duran on Benny Velarde's (Note: Benny Velarde (born 1929), a percussionist, immigrated to the United States and became a naturalized citizen in 1950. His birth name was Epimenides Bayardo Velarde. When he was naturalized, he changed his legal name to Bayardo Crespo Velarde.) album Ay Que Rico.

From 1976 to 1981, Duran was a member of Benny Goodman's orchestras, which included an acclaimed performance with Goodman's octet at Carnegie Hall on June 28, 1976, in connection with the Newport Jazz Festival. Between 1980 and 1982, Duran recorded with Tania Maria. In the late 1980s, after his last two children had grown, Duran moved to New York City and performed in a quartet that he organized. Duran crossed paths with Getz again in 1983 while recording the Dee Bell studio album, Let There Be Love. On October 19, 1983, he married Madeleine ("Mad") Askew in Sonoma County, California. Mad Duran, who is twenty-eight years younger than Eddie Duran, is a classically trained clarinetist and saxophonist and music educator. Duran and his wife have collaborated on five albums, including From Here to the Moon: Mad and Eddie Duran, which they produced in 1996.

Duran was once a licensed barber.

He died on November 22, 2019, at the age of 94.

== Discography ==
=== As leader ===
- Jazz Guitarist (Fantasy, 1957)
- Ginza (Concord Jazz, 1979)
- From Here to the Moon (Mad Eddie, 1997)

=== As sideman ===
With Vince Guaraldi

- Vince Guaraldi Trio (Fantasy, 1956)
- A Flower Is a Lovesome Thing (Fantasy, 1958)
- In Person (Fantasy, 1963)
- Jazz Impressions (Fantasy, 1964)
- The Latin Side of Vince Guaraldi (Fantasy, 1964)
- Vince Guaraldi with the San Francisco Boys Chorus (D&D, 1967)
- Oh Good Grief! (Warner Bros.-Seven Arts, 1968)
- The Eclectic Vince Guaraldi (Warner Bros.-Seven Arts, 1969)
- Alma-Ville (Warner Bros.-Seven Arts, 1969)
- North Beach (D&D, 2006)
- An Afternoon with the Vince Guaraldi Quartet (V.A.G. Publishing, 2011)

With Tania Maria

- Piquant (Concord Jazz Picante, 1981)
- Taurus (Concord Jazz Picante, 1982)
- Come with Me (Concord Jazz, Picante 1983)

With Cal Tjader

- San Francisco Moods (Fantasy, 1958)
- Tjader Plays Tjazz (Fantasy, 1956)
- Last Night When We Were Young (Fantasy, 1975)

With others

- Dee Bell, Let There Be Love (Concord Jazz, 1983)
- Dee Bell, One by One (Concord Jazz, 1985)
- Stan Getz, Cal Tjader-Stan Getz Sextet (Fantasy, 1958)
- Benny Goodman Band, Aurex Jazz Festival '80: King of Swing (Eastworld, 1980)
- Jon Hendricks, Tell Me the Truth (Arista, 1975)
- Earl Hines, Fatha Plays Fats (Fantasy, 1956)
- Eiji Kitamura, Teddy Wilson, Cal Tjader, Seven Stars (Concord Jazz, 1982)
- Gus Mancuso, Cal Tjader, Vince Guaraldi, Introducing Gus Mancuso (Fantasy, 1956)
