= The Latin Side of Vince Guaraldi =

Studio album by Vince Guaraldi
- Released: August 1964
- Recorded: Summer 1963
- Studios: Coast Recorders, San Francisco, California
- Genre: Latin jazz
- Length: 31:36
- Label: Fantasy

Vince Guaraldi chronology
| Jazz Impressions (1964) | The Latin Side of Vince Guaraldi (1964) | Jazz Impressions of A Boy Named Charlie Brown (1964) |

Singles from The Latin Side of Vince Guaraldi
- 1. "Treat Street" Released: 1964

Professional ratings
Review scores
| Source | Rating |
|---|---|
| AllMusic | 4/5 stars |
| Five Cents Please | 3/5 stars |
| The Penguin Guide to Jazz Recordings | 2.5/4 stars |

The Latin Side of Vince Guaraldi is the fifth studio album by Vince Guaraldi released by Fantasy Records in 1964. In a departure from his standard jazz output, Guaraldi combined elements of Brazilian and Caribbean styles of Latin jazz, utilizing a string quartet on five tracks.

A remastered edition was released on CD in March 1996.

== Background ==
The unexpected success of Jazz Impressions of Black Orpheus and the Grammy-winning "Cast Your Fate to the Wind" resulted in Guaraldi's drive to explore new musical directions.

In particular, Guaraldi wanted to augment several tracks with a string quartet. "I am very proud of it," Guaraldi stated on the album's liner notes. "I want to do things like this and when I am writing tunes or playing my tunes, I think of them in other settings. I think of big bands and string sections when I sit down at the piano, just as Erroll Garner thinks of the piano as an orchestra."

For the album's orchestrations, Guaraldi turned to Jack Weeks, son of bandleader Anson Weeks, who had previously worked with Guaraldi peers Cal Tjader and Dave Brubeck. Guaraldi commented that Weeks could "really write so those strings sound right. I wanted to get a sort of Villa Lobos (sic) voicing and that's what Jack got."

Weeks ultimately arranged string sections for "Mr. Lucky", "Corcovado (Quiet Nights of Quiet Stars)", "Star Song", "Dor Que Faz Doer (Pain That Hurts)" and "Brasilia."

== Cover art ==
Statuesque Gretchen Glanzer and diminutive Guaraldi appear together on the cover. Guaraldi was married at the time but he was carrying on a long-term affair with Glanzer. Born in 1941, she worked at the Hungry i jazz club and met Guaraldi around 1960–61 when she was 19. She later worked for the production company Bill Graham Presents. The two appeared again together in 1969 on the back cover of the Grateful Dead album Aoxomoxoa in a photograph showing 25 people including the band, their families, and their friends. She later married and took the surname Katamay.

== Critical reception ==
In a contemporary review, Cashbox acknowledged Guaraldi's stylistic shift with approval: "Vince Guaraldi makes a musical about-face and injects strings and a lush Latin beat on this new package of standards, newies and originals. Guaraldi demonstrates that he can swing in any idiom, as he dishes up extremely appealing readings of 'Mr. Lucky,' 'What Kind of Fool Am I' and 'Treat Street.' Album should sell like hotcakes."

AllMusic critic Richard S. Ginell commented that the album contains "Brazilian and Caribbean strains of Latin jazz, garnished now and then by an outboard string quartet," praising Guaraldi's piano work, saying it is "hauntingly melodic, impulsively swinging, and unmistakable for anyone else's."

Guaraldi historian and Vince Guaraldi at the Piano author Derrick Bang commented that, "Those who believe that jazz bands and string quartets are incompatible are advised to treat this album with suspicion; although it may have seemed like a good idea at the time, Guaraldi's decision to employ a string quartet as background on five of these numbers is dubious at best. The resulting 'E-Z listening sound' only detracts from the otherwise pleasant work." Bang concluded by saying, "All in all, this is pleasant background music, but it lacks Guaraldi's usual jazz chops."

== Track listing ==
All tracks are written by Vince Guaraldi, except where noted.

Side One
| No. | Title | Writer(s) | Length |
|---|---|---|---|
| 1. | "Mr. Lucky" (with strings) | Henry Mancini | 2:53 |
| 2. | "What Kind of Fool Am I?" | Leslie Bricusse; Anthony Newley | 4:05 |
| 3. | "Corcovado (Quiet Nights of Quiet Stars)" (with strings) | Antônio Carlos Jobim | 3:20 |
| 4. | "Work Song" | Nat Adderley; Oscar Brown, Jr. | 4:12 |

Side Two
| No. | Title | Writer(s) | Length |
|---|---|---|---|
| 5. | "Treat Street" | | 2:59 |
| 6. | "Star Song" (with strings) | Vince Guaraldi; William Siden | 3:37 |
| 7. | "Whirlpool" | | 3:51 |
| 8. | "Dor Que Faz Doer (Pain That Hurts)" (with strings) | Luiz Bonfá | 2:50 |
| 9. | "Brasilia" (with strings) | | 3:49 |
| Total length: | | | 31:36 |

== Personnel ==
Credits adapted from 1964 album liner notes.

Vince Guaraldi Sextet

- Vince Guaraldi – piano
- Eddie Duran – guitar
- Fred Marshall – double bass
- Jerry Granelli – drums
- Bill Fitch – congas (Tracks 2, 4, 5, 7)
- Benny Velarde – timbales (Tracks 2, 4, 5, 7)

== Production ==
- Jack Weeks – arranger, string quartet (Tracks 1, 3, 6, 8, 9)
- Ralph J. Gleason – liner notes
- Charles "Chas" Weckler – cover photo
- Balzer-Shopes – cover design
- Gretchen Glanzer – model on cover
- Lilli Ann – clothes
- Jim Melvin Typographers – typesetting

== See also ==
- Vince Guaraldi discography
- List of songs recorded by Vince Guaraldi
- List of cover versions of Vince Guaraldi songs
- Lee Mendelson Film Productions
