= A Flower Is a Lovesome Thing =

Studio album by Vince Guaraldi
- Released: October 1957
- Recorded: April 16, 1957
- Studios: Fantasy Recording Studios, San Francisco, California
- Genre: Jazz
- Length: 34:40
- Labels: Fantasy (US); Vocalion (UK)

Vince Guaraldi chronology
| Vince Guaraldi Trio (1956) | A Flower Is a Lovesome Thing (1957) | Jazz Impressions of Black Orpheus (1962) |

Professional ratings
Review scores
| Source | Rating |
|---|---|
| AllMusic | 4/5 stars |
| Five Cents Please | 4/5 stars |
| The Penguin Guide to Jazz Recordings | 2.5/4 stars |

A Flower Is a Lovesome Thing is the second studio album by American jazz pianist Vince Guaraldi (credited to the Vince Guaraldi Trio), released in the US by Fantasy Records in October 1957.

== Background ==
A Flower Is a Lovesome Thing exhibits the trio's growth from the safer jazz style played in their self-titled album Vince Guaraldi Trio. Guaraldi employed the same musicians as he did for his debut album; guitarist Eddie Duran and bassist Dean Reilly. Guaraldi began exploring his personal style on the piano with these tracks before becoming commonly recognized and as a great jazz pianist for his latin style in his following album Jazz Impressions of Black Orpheus (1962).

== Critical reception ==
DownBeat praised the album's soothing tone, noting, in part, that "Guaraldi is serenely wistful in his interpretation of Billy Strayhorn's title song, is surely relaxed in the lightly swinging 'Softly.' He delightfully colors the impressionistic 'Yesterdays.' 'Like a Rose' is accorded a treatment almost elegiac in its poetic quietude."

Guaraldi historian and author Derrick Bang ranks the album as one of the pianist's "prettiest," adding that it is "gentle and lyrical, as befits a collective theme that revolves around flora and changing seasons." AllMusic critic Scott Yanow said the album is one of Guaraldi's "better sets", adding that the pianist "plays...tastefully and with light swing, making this a program that is equally successful as both cool jazz and background music."

== Track listing ==
Side One
| No. | Title | Writer(s) | Length |
|---|---|---|---|
| 1. | "A Flower Is a Lovesome Thing" | Billy Strayhorn | 5:37 |
| 2. | "Softly, as in a Morning Sunrise" | Oscar Hammerstein II; Sigmund Romberg | 3:28 |
| 3. | "Yesterdays" | Otto Harbach; Jerome Kern | 4:00 |
| 4. | "Like a Mighty Rose" (aka "Room at the Bottom") | Vince Guaraldi | 4:30 |

Side Two
| No. | Title | Writer(s) | Length |
|---|---|---|---|
| 1. | "Looking for a Boy" | George Gershwin; Ira Gershwin | 4:06 |
| 2. | "Autumn Leaves" | Joseph Kosma; Johnny Mercer | 4:22 |
| 3. | "Lonely Girl" | Bobby Troup | 3:23 |
| 4. | "Willow Weep for Me" | Ann Ronell | 5:14 |
| Total length: | | | 34:40 |

== Personnel ==
Vince Guaraldi Trio

- Vince Guaraldi – piano
- Eddie Duran – guitar
- Dean Reilly – double bass

Additional

- Ralph J. Gleason – liner notes
- Phil De Lancie – digital remastering (1994)

== Release history ==
| Country | Date | Label | Format | Catalogue number |
|---|---|---|---|---|
| United States | April 1958 | Fantasy | Mono LP | 3357 |
| United Kingdom | Unknown | Vocalion | Mono LP | LAE569 |
| Australia | Unknown | Vogue Productions | Mono LP | LAEA-569 |
| United States | 1986 | Fantasy | Mono cassette | F-3257 |
| United States | 1986 | Fantasy/Original Jazz Classics | Mono LP | OJC-235, F-3257 |
| United States | 1994 | Fantasy/Original Jazz Classics | Mono CD | OJCCD-235-2, F-3257 |
| Europe | 2006 | Fantasy/Original Jazz Classics | Mono CD | 00025218623520 |

== See also ==
- Vince Guaraldi discography
- List of songs recorded by Vince Guaraldi
- List of cover versions of Vince Guaraldi songs
- Lee Mendelson Film Productions
