= Vince Guaraldi Trio (album) =

Studio album by Vince Guaraldi
- Released: September 1956
- Recorded: April 1956
- Studios: Fantasy Recording Studios, San Francisco, California
- Genre: Jazz
- Length: 37:39
- Label: Fantasy

Vince Guaraldi chronology
Modern Music from San Francisco (1956)	Vince Guaraldi Trio (1956)	A Flower Is a Lovesome Thing (1958)

Vince Guaraldi Trio is the debut studio album by American jazz pianist Vince Guaraldi (credited to the Vince Guaraldi Trio), released in the US by Fantasy Records in September 1956. It was recorded in San Francisco, California, in April 1956.

== Critical reception ==
Professional ratings
Review scores
Source	Rating
AllMusic	3/5 stars
Billboard	(favorable)
The Penguin Guide to Jazz	2.5/4 stars
The Rolling Stone Jazz Record Guide	3/5 stars
DownBeat	4/4 stars
Five Cents Please	4/5 stars

The Penguin Guide to Jazz commented on the "mild, unambitious variations on standards" and suggested that Duran was more prominent than Guaraldi. AllMusic reviewer Scott Yanow wrote that the pianist "swings lightly and with subtle creativity".

Billboard wrote a positive review, “Altho [sic] sales are unlikely to be spectacular, this is one of the pleasant surprises of the month. Guaraldi is a young San Francisco pianist who has been getting rave notices with the Woody Herman band. Evidence here says he’s a tasteful, authoritative and facile modernist, and that he swings. Further, he has a sense of humor. Guitarist Eddie Duran and bassist Dean Reilly are worthy colleagues. Try their version of John Lewis' 'Django' for a real delight.”

DownBeat was also positive, writing "In an era when too many jazz pianists limit themselves to a narrow range of moods and skills, San Franciscan Guaraldi is an expanding pleasure to hear. A jazzman with deep roots in his language, Vince projects clearly an individual musical personality: direct, emotional, inventive, tied-to-no-school. [He] is a man of wide-ranging sensitivity".

Guaraldi historian and author Derrick Bang noted that the "absence of drums contributes to the album's quieter sound, and Guaraldi displays none of the Latin-influenced touch that later would consume him, and very little of the energetic chops he delivered while working with the Woody Herman and Cal Tjader bands."

== Track listing ==
Side One
No.	Title	Writer(s)	Length
1.	"Django"	John Lewis	4:57
2.	"Fenwyck's Farfel"	Vince Guaraldi	4:05
3.	"Never Never Land"	Betty Comden; Adolph Green; Jule Styne	4:15
4.	"Chelsea Bridge"	Billy Strayhorn	3:39
5.	"Fascinating Rhythm"	George Gershwin; Ira Gershwin	2:45

Side Two
No.	Title	Writer(s)	Length
1.	"The Lady's in Love with You"	Burton Lane; Frank Loesser	3:52
2.	"Sweet and Lovely"	Gus Arnheim; Charles N. Daniels; Harry Tobias	3:42
3.	"Ossobucco"	Eddie Duran	2:55
4.	"Three Coins in the Fountain"	Sammy Cahn; Jule Styne	4:06
5.	"It's De-Lovely"	Cole Porter	3:23
Total length:			37:39

== Personnel ==
Adapted from album's original vinyl rear cover sleeve.

Vince Guaraldi Trio

- Vince Guaraldi – piano
- Eddie Duran – guitar
- Dean Reilly – double bass

Additional

- Ralph J. Gleason – liner notes

== See also ==
- Vince Guaraldi discography
- List of songs recorded by Vince Guaraldi
- List of cover versions of Vince Guaraldi songs
- Lee Mendelson Film Productions
