= Eliot Zigmund =

American jazz drummer (born 1945)

- Born: April 14, 1945 (age 81); New York City, New York, U.S.
- Genres: Jazz
- Occupations: Musician, professor
- Instrument: Drums
- Years active: 1970–present

Eliot Zigmund (born April 14, 1945) is an American jazz drummer, who has worked extensively as a session musician.

== Biography ==
Zigmund studied at Mannes School of Music and City College of New York, where he graduated in 1969. After moving to California, he found work in the 1970s playing with Ron McClure, Steve Swallow, Art Lande, Mike Nock, Mel Martin, and Vince Guaraldi. He moved back to New York City in 1974, where he played with Bill Evans from 1975 to 1978. He also played with Eddie Gómez, Bennie Wallace, Richard Beirach, Jim Hall, Chet Baker, Stan Getz, Fred Hersch, and Red Mitchell before the end of the 1970s.

He played with Don Friedman from 1979 to 1984, and then joined a trio with Michel Petrucciani until the late 1980s. After this he worked both as a leader in small ensembles and as a sideman with Gary Peacock (1980), Carl Barry (1982), Keith Greko (1985), Eiji Nakayama (1988), and Stefan Karlsson (1995).

Zigmund has also done work as a session player for Neil Sedaka, Dionne Warwick, and The Pointer Sisters, among others.

A resident of Teaneck, New Jersey, Zigmund has taught at William Paterson College and New York University.

== Discography ==
=== As leader ===
- Time Was (SteepleChase, 2017)
- Live at Smalls (SmallsLIVE, 2018)

=== As sideman ===
With Bill Evans

- Crosscurrents (Fantasy, 1978)
- Affinity (Warner Bros, 1979)
- I Will Say Goodbye (Fantasy, 1980)
- You Must Believe in Spring (Warner Bros., 1981)
- From the 70's (Fantasy, 1983)
- The Paris Concert (Fantasy, 1989)
- In His Own Way (West Wind, 1989)
- The Secret Sessions (Milestone, 1996)
- On a Monday Evening (Fantasy, 2017)

With Vince Guaraldi

- It's a Mystery, Charlie Brown (soundtrack) (Lee Mendelson Film Productions, 1974)
- Live on the Air (D&D, 1974)
- It's the Easter Beagle, Charlie Brown (soundtrack) (Lee Mendelson Film Productions, 1974)

With Michel Petrucciani

- Live at the Village Vanguard (Concord Jazz, 1985)
- Live at the Village Vanguard Vol. 2 (Video Artists, 1982)
- Pianism (Blue Note, 1986)

With others

- Joshua Breakstone, No One New (Capri, 2009)
- Don Friedman, Half & Half (Insights, 1986)
- Eddie Gomez, Down Stretch (Trio, 1976)
- Amy London, Bridges (FiveCut, 2014)
- Giovanni Mirabassi, Tribute to Bill (Star Prod 2011)
- Gary Peacock, Shift in the Wind (ECM, 1980)
- Marvin Stamm, Elegance (2001)
- Christina von Bulow, The Good Life (Stunt, 2014)
- Christina von Bulow, On the Brink of a Lovely Song (Storyville, 2018)

== Sources ==
- Kennedy, Garry W. "Eliot Zigmund". The New Grove Dictionary of Jazz. Oxford University Press.
