= Peanuts animated specials =

Short films based on the comic strips

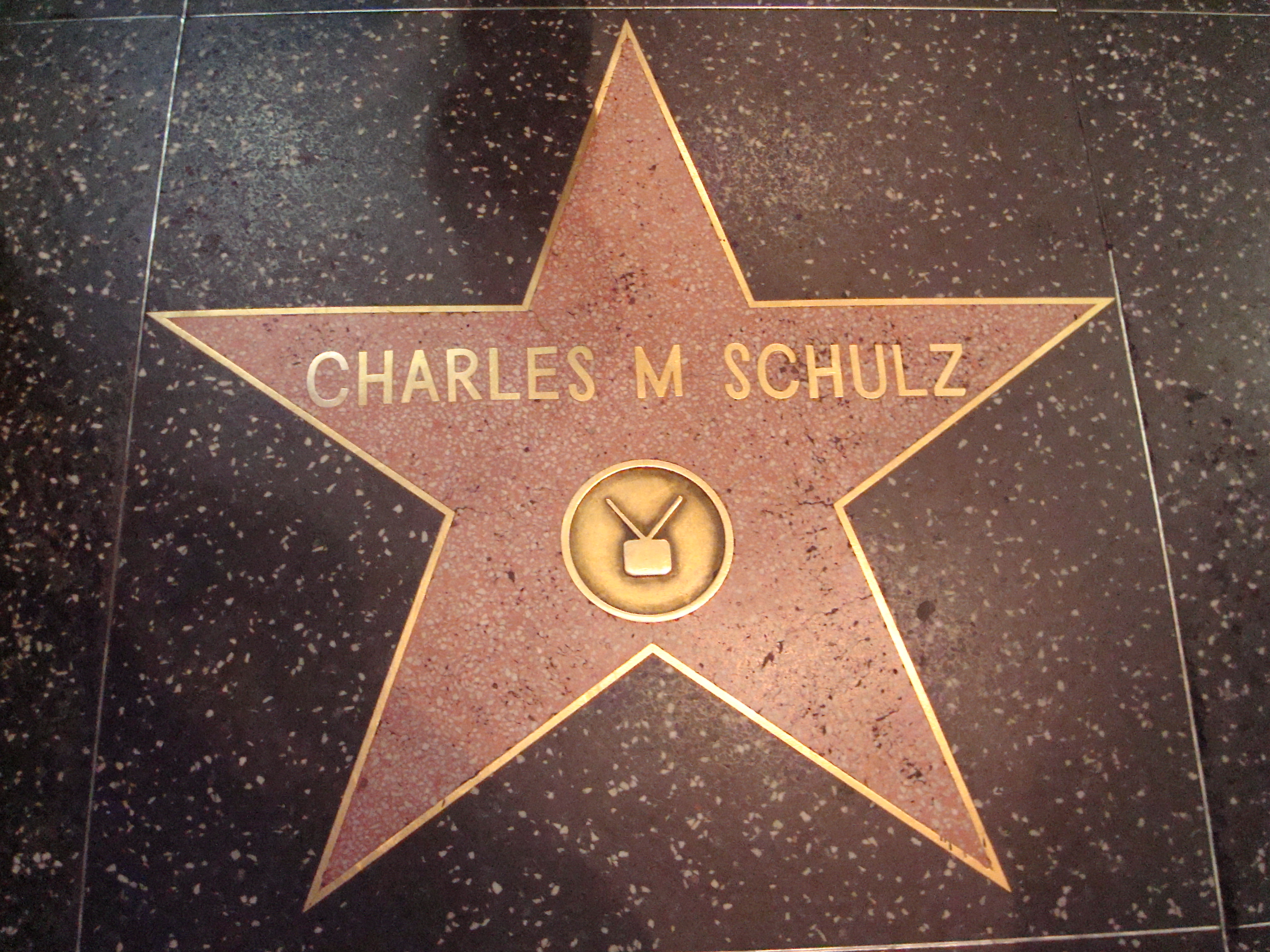
- Charles Schulz's Hollywood Walk of Fame star. It features the 'television receiver' honor, which is for contribution to broadcast television.
- Genre: Comedy
- Based on: Peanuts; by Charles M. Schulz
- Producer: Lee Mendelson; Bill Melendez
- Theme: "Linus and Lucy"
- Composer(s): Vince Guaraldi; Ed Bogas; Desirée Goyette; David Benoit
- Production companies: Bill Melendez Productions; United Media Productions; Lee Mendelson Film Productions; Charles M. Schulz Creative Associates (until 2009); WildBrain Studios; Peanuts Worldwide, LLC; Schulz Studios (since the 2020s)
- Distributed by: Paramount Pictures (formerly); Warner Bros. Domestic Television Distribution (formerly); WildBrain Distribution (formerly); Sony Pictures Television (current)
- Country of origin: United States
- Original language(s): English
- No. of specials: 54
- Years: 1965–present

Peanuts is a comic strip created by American cartoonist Charles M. Schulz in 1950. The characters have appeared in 54 animated specials since 1965, most of them released on television. This article describes the history of these programs, including notable sponsors, directors, and voice actors.

== History ==
In the strip, adult voices are heard and understood in-universe, though conversations are usually only depicted from the children's end. To translate this aspect to the animated medium, adult dialogue was represented by the sound of a trombone with a solotone mute, created by Vince Guaraldi and played by Dean Hubbard.

Thirteen Peanuts-based specials have been made after the death of Charles Schulz. Of these, eight are tributes to Peanuts or other Peanuts specials, and six are completely new specials based on dialogue from the strips and ideas given to ABC by Schulz before his death. He's a Bully, Charlie Brown, was telecast on ABC on November 20, 2006, following a repeat broadcast of A Charlie Brown Thanksgiving. Airing 43 years after the first special, the premiere of He's a Bully, Charlie Brown was watched by nearly 10 million viewers, winning its time slot and beating a Madonna concert special.

In October 2007, Warner Home Video acquired worldwide home video rights to the Peanuts TV specials from Paramount Home Entertainment and other distributors. The deal would also allow Warner Bros. to produce new direct-to-video Peanuts content and short-form digital content for release under the Warner Premiere label.

Accordingly, the streaming rights to Peanuts media are scattered across multiple platforms. The Peanuts Movie, distributed by 20th Century Fox, became part of The Walt Disney Company library and is on Disney+.

== Cast ==
Character	Charlie Brown	Snoopy	Linus Van Pelt	Lucy Van Pelt	Sally Brown	Schroeder	Shermy	Patty	Violet Gray	Pig-Pen	Frieda	Peppermint Patty	Woodstock	Franklin	Marcie
A Charlie Brown Christmas	Peter Robbins	Bill Melendez	Christopher Shea	Tracy Stratford	Cathy Steinberg	Chris Doran	Chris Doran	Karen Mendelson	Sally Dryer	Geoffrey Ornstein	Ann Altieri				
Charlie Brown's All Stars!	Peter Robbins	Bill Melendez	Christopher Shea	Sally Dryer	Cathy Steinberg	Glenn Mendelson	Christopher DeFaria	Lynn Vanderlip	Karen Mendelson	Geoffrey Ornstein	Ann Altieri				
It's the Great Pumpkin...	Peter Robbins	Bill Melendez	Christopher Shea	Sally Dryer	Cathy Steinberg	Glenn Mendelson	Glenn Mendelson	Lisa DeFaria	Ann Altieri	Gabrielle DeFaria Ritter	Ann Altieri				
You're in Love...	Peter Robbins	Bill Melendez	Christopher Shea	Sally Dryer	Cathy Steinberg	Silent		Silent	Ann Altieri	Silent		Gabrielle DeFaria Ritter			
He's Your Dog...	Peter Robbins	Bill Melendez	Christopher Shea	Sally Dryer		Glenn Mendelson		Lisa DeFaria	Ann Altieri			Gabrielle DeFaria Ritter			
It Was a Short Summer...	Peter Robbins	Bill Melendez	Glenn Gilger	Pamelyn Ferdin	Hilary Momberger	John Daschback	David Carey	Lisa DeFaria	Ann Altieri	Gabrielle DeFaria Ritter	Ann Altieri	Christopher DeFaria			
Play It Again...	Chris Inglis	Bill Melendez	Stephen Shea	Pamelyn Ferdin	Hilary Momberger	Danny Hjelm				Chris Inglis	Lynda Mendelson	Christopher DeFaria			
You're Not Elected...	Chad Webber	Bill Melendez	Stephen Shea	Robin Kohn	Hilary Momberger	Brian Kazanjian	Silent	Silent	Linda Ercoli	Silent	Silent	Silent	Bill Melendez		
There's No Time for Love...	Chad Webber	Bill Melendez	Stephen Shea	Robin Kohn	Hilary Momberger			Silent	Silent		Silent	Christopher DeFaria		Todd Barbee	Jimmy Ahrens
A Charlie Brown Thanksgiving	Todd Barbee	Bill Melendez	Stephen Shea	Robin Kohn	Hilary Momberger							Christopher DeFaria	Bill Melendez	Robin Reed	Jimmy Ahrens
It's A Mystery...	Todd Barbee	Bill Melendez	Stephen Shea	Melanie Kohn	Lynn Mortensen					Tom Muller		Donna LeTourneau	Bill Melendez		Jimmy Ahrens
It's the Easter Beagle...	Todd Barbee	Bill Melendez	Stephen Shea	Melanie Kohn	Lynn Mortensen	Todd Barbee						Linda Ercoli	Bill Melendez		Jimmy Ahrens
Be My Valentine...	Duncan Watson	Bill Melendez	Stephen Shea	Melanie Kohn	Lynn Mortensen	Greg Felton	Silent	Silent	Linda Ercoli	Silent	Linda Ercoli	Silent	Bill Melendez	Silent	Silent
You're a Good Sport...	Duncan Watson	Bill Melendez	Liam Martin	Melanie Kohn	Gail Davis	Silent		Silent	Silent		Silent	Stuart Brotman	Bill Melendez	Silent	Jimmy Ahrens
It's Arbor Day...	Dylan Beach	Bill Melendez	Liam Martin	Sarah Beach	Gail Davis	Greg Felton		Silent	Silent		Michelle Muller	Stuart Brotman	Bill Melendez	Silent	Silent
It's Your First Kiss...	Arrin Skelley	Bill Melendez	Daniel Anderson	Michelle Muller	Silent	Silent		Silent	Silent	Silent	Silent	Laura Planting	Silent	Ronald Hendrix	Silent
What a Nightmare...	Liam Martin	Bill Melendez													
You're the Greatest...	Arrin Skelley	Bill Melendez	Daniel Anderson	Michelle Muller	Silent	Silent				Silent	Silent	Patricia Patts	Bill Melendez		Casey Carlson
She's a Good Skate...	Arrin Skelley	Bill Melendez	Daniel Anderson	Laura Planting		Silent						Patricia Patts	Jason Serinus		Casey Carlson
Life Is a Circus...	Michael Mandy	Bill Melendez	Earl Reilly	Kristin Fullerton		Christopher Donahoe						Brent Hauer			Shannon Cohn
It's Magic...	Michael Mandy	Bill Melendez	Earl Reilly	Sydney Penny	Cindi Reilly	Christopher Donahoe		Silent			Silent	Brent Hauer	Bill Melendez	Earl Reilly	Shannon Cohn
Someday You'll Find Her...	Grant Wehr	Bill Melendez	Earl Reilly										Bill Melendez		
A Charlie Brown Celebration	Michael Mandy	Bill Melendez	Earl Reilly	Kristen Fullerton	Cindi Reilly	Christopher Donahoe						Brent Hauer	Bill Melendez	Christopher Donahoe	Shannon Cohn
Is This Goodbye...?	Brad Kesten	Bill Melendez	Jeremy Schoenberg	Angela Lee	Stacy Heather Tolkin	Kevin Brando	Silent	Silent	Silent	Silent		Victoria Vargas		Kevin Brando	Michael Dockery
It's an Adventure...	Michael Catalano	Bill Melendez	Earl Reilly	Angela Lee	Cindi Reilly	Brad Schacter						Brent Hauer	Bill Melendez		Michael Dockery
What Have We Learned...?	Brad Kesten	Bill Melendez	Jeremy Schoenberg		Stacy Heather Tolkin							Brent Hauer	Bill Melendez		Michael Dockery
It's Flashbeagle...	Brett Johnson Brad Kesten (singing)	Bill Melendez	Jeremy Schoenberg David T. Wagner (singing)	Heather Stoneman Jessica Lee Smith (singing)	Fergie	Gary Goren Kevin Brando (singing)				Joe Chemay	Silent	Gini Holtzman	Silent	Silent	Keri Houlihan
Snoopy's Getting Married...	Brett Johnson	Bill Melendez	Jeremy Schoenberg	Heather Stoneman	Fergie Dawnn D. Leary (singing)	Danny Colby		Silent	Fergie	Silent		Gini Holtzman	Bill Melendez	Silent	Keri Houlihan
You're a Good Man...	Brad Kesten Kevin Brando (singing)	Bill Melendez Robert Towers (singing and speaking)	David T. Wagner	Jessica Lee Smith	Tiffany Reinbolt	Jeremy Reinbolt					Silent	Silent	Bill Melendez	Silent	Michael Dockery
Happy New Year...!	Chad Allen	Bill Melendez	Jeremy Miller	Melissa Guzzi	Elizabeth Lyn Fraser	Aron Mandelbaum		Silent	Silent	Silent	Silent	Kristie Baker	Bill Melendez	Silent	Jason Muller
Snoopy! The Musical	Sean Collins	Bill Melendez Cam Clarke (singing and speaking)	Jeremy Miller	Tiffany Billings	Ami Foster	Silent					Silent	Kristie Baker	Bill Melendez	Silent	Silent
It's the Girl in the Red Truck...	Jason Riffle	Silent													
Why, Charlie Brown, Why?	Kaleb Henley	Bill Melendez	Brandon Stewart	Jennifer Banko	Adrienne Stiefel	Silent	Silent	Silent	Silent			Silent	Bill Melendez	Silent	Silent
Snoopy's Reunion	Phil Shafran	Bill Melendez	Josh Keaton		Kaitlyn Walker										
It's Spring Training...	Justin Shenkarow	Bill Melendez	John Christian Graas	Marnette Patterson		Travis Boles	Silent	Elisabeth Moss		Silent				Jessica Nwafor	
It's Christmastime Again...	Jamie E. Smith	Bill Melendez	John Christian Graas	Marnette Patterson	Mindy Ann Martin			Deanna Tello	Deanna Tello		Brittany M. Thornton	Phillip Lucier	Bill Melendez	Sean Mendelson	Lindsay Benesh
You're in the Super Bowl...	Jimmy Guardino	Bill Melendez	John Christian Graas	Molly Dunham						Silent		Haley Peel	Bill Melendez	Silent	Nicole Fisher
It Was My Best Birthday Ever...	Steven Hartman	Bill Melendez	Anthony Burch	Jamie Cronin	Danielle Keaton	Pictured	Silent	Silent		Brandon Taylor	Silent		Bill Melendez	Silent	Silent
It's the Pied Piper...	Quinn Beswick	Bill Melendez	Corey Padnos	Rachel Davey	Ashley Edner	Silent			Silent	Silent		Silent		Silent	Silent
A Charlie Brown Valentine	Wesley Singerman	Bill Melendez	Corey Padnos	Lauren Schaffel	Nicolette Little	Christopher Ryan Johnson				Silent		Emily Lalande		Silent	Jessica D. Stone
Charlie Brown's Christmas Tales	Wesley Singerman	Bill Melendez	Corey Padnos	Serena Berman	Megan Harvey	Christopher Ryan Johnson							Bill Melendez		
Lucy Must Be Traded...	Wesley Singerman	Bill Melendez	Corey Padnos	Serena Berman	Megan Harvey	Christopher Ryan Johnson				Silent	Silent	Daniel Hansen	Bill Melendez		Melissa Montoya
I Want a Dog for Christmas...	Adam Taylor Gordon	Bill Melendez	Corey Padnos	Ashley Rose Orr	Hannah Leigh Dworkin	Nick Price		Silent	Kaitlyn Maggio	Jake Miner			Bill Melendez	Jake Miner	
He's a Bully...	Spencer Robert Scott	Bill Melendez	Benjamin Bryan	Stephanie Patton	Silent	Silent		Silent	Jolean Wejbe	Silent	Silent	Rory Thost	Silent	Silent	Jessica D. Stone
Happiness Is a Warm Blanket...	Trenton Rogers	Andy Beall	Austin Lux	Grace Rolek	Amanda Pace	Trenton Rogers	Andy Pessoa	Ciara Bravo	Blesst Bowden	Shane Baumel	Silent		Andy Beall		
For Auld Lang Syne	Etienne Kellici	Terry McGurrin	Wyatt White	Isabella Leo	Hattie Kragten	Matthew Mucci	Will Bhaneja	Natasha Nathan	Charlie Boyle	Jacob Soley	Maya Misaljevic	Lexi Perri	Rob Tinkler	Caleb Bellavance	Holly Gorski
It's the Small Things...	Tyler Nathan	Terry McGurrin	Wyatt White	Isabella Leo	Hattie Kragten	Matthew Mucci	Will Bhaneja	Natasha Nathan	Charlie Boyle	Jacob Soley	Maya Misaljevic	Lexi Perri	Rob Tinkler	Caleb Bellavance	Holly Gorski
To Mom (and Dad), With Love	Tyler Nathan	Terry McGurrin	Wyatt White	Isabella Leo	Hattie Kragten	Matthew Mucci		Natasha Nathan	Charlie Boyle	Jacob Soley	Maya Misaljevic	Lexi Perri	Rob Tinkler	Caleb Bellavance	Holly Gorski
Lucy's School	Etienne Kellici	Terry McGurrin	Wyatt White	Isabella Leo	Hattie Kragten	Matthew Mucci	Silent	Natasha Nathan	Charlie Boyle	Jacob Soley	Silent	Lexi Perri	Rob Tinkler	Caleb Bellavance	Holly Gorski
One-of-a-Kind Marcie	Etienne Kellici	Terry McGurrin	Wyatt White	Isabella Leo		Silent	Will Bhaneja	Natasha Nathan	Charlie Boyle	Lucien Duncan-Reid	Maya Misaljevic	Lexi Perri	Rob Tinkler	Caleb Bellavance	Arianna McDonald
Welcome Home, Franklin	Etienne Kellici	Terry McGurrin	Wyatt White	Isabella Leo	Hattie Kragten	Cash Allen-Martin	Will Bhaneja	Natasha Nathan	Charlie Boyle	Lucien Duncan-Reid	Maya Misaljevic	Lexi Perri	Rob Tinkler	Caleb Bellavance	Arianna McDonald
A Summer Musical	Etienne Kellici Jayd Deroché (singing)	Terry McGurrin	Wyatt White	Isabella Leo	Hattie Kragten	Silent	Silent	Silent	Silent	Silent	Silent	Lexi Perri	Rob Tinkler	Caleb Bellavance	Arianna McDonald
There's No Place Like Home...	Riley Vargas	Terry McGurrin	Athan Giazitzidis	Jo-Hannah Atchison	Grace Nicolaou-Wood	Silent	River Morales	Ariel Ollivierre	Addison Wagman	Lorenzo Bezzina	Silent	Lexi Perri	Rob Tinkler	Kitai O'Garro	Josephine Nisbett
12 Days of Snoopy	Riley Vargas	Terry McGurrin	Athan Giazitzidis	Jo-Hannah Atchison	Grace Nicolaou-Wood	Asher Waxman	River Morales	Ariel Ollivierre	Addison Wagman	Lorenzo Bezzina	Olivia King	Lexi Perri	Rob Tinkler	Kitai O'Garro	Josephine Nisbett

== See also ==
- Peanuts filmography
