= Snoopy Presents: Lucy's School =

2022 Peanuts animated television special

- Genre: Animated television special
- Based on: Peanuts by Charles M. Schulz
- Written by: Craig Schulz; Bryan Schulz; Cornelius Uliano
- Directed by: Raymond S. Persi
- Voices of: Etienne Kellici; Isabella Leo; Wyatt White; Terry McGurrin; Rob Tinkler
- Music by: Jeff Morrow
- Countries of origin: Canada; United States
- Original language: English

Production
- Executive producers: Craig Schulz; Bryan Schulz; Cornelius Uliano; Paige Braddock; Josh Scherba; Stephanie Betts; Amir Nasrabadi; Anne Loi
- Producers: James Brown; Timothy Jason Smith
- Running time: 38 minutes
- Production companies: WildBrain Studios; Peanuts Worldwide; Schulz Studio

Original release
- Network: Apple TV+
- Release: August 12, 2022

Related
- Snoopy Presents: To Mom (and Dad), With Love (2022); Snoopy Presents: One-of-a-Kind Marcie (2023)

Snoopy Presents: Lucy's School, also known simply as Lucy's School, is a 2022 animated television special based on the Peanuts comic strip by Charles M. Schulz. Directed by Raymond S. Persi and written by Craig Schulz, Bryan Schulz, and Cornelius Uliano, it is the 49th Peanuts animated special and the fourth produced for Apple TV+. The story follows Lucy van Pelt, who opens a school of her own after becoming anxious about attending a new school.

The special was released globally on Apple TV+ on August 12, 2022. It won Best Animation Program at the 2023 Leo Awards and was nominated for Outstanding Animated Special at the second Children's and Family Emmy Awards.

== Plot ==
As summer vacation nears its end, Charlie Brown and his friends learn that they will attend a newly built school in the fall. Most of the children are curious about the change, but Lucy is unsettled by the prospect of unfamiliar teachers, older students, lockers, and being separated from her friends. She hides her anxiety by criticizing the new school and eventually declares that she will open a school of her own.

Lucy recruits the other children as pupils and sets up a classroom. Convinced that teaching will be easy, she presents herself as an authority on every subject. Her lessons quickly become disorganized, however, and her answers are challenged by Linus, Franklin, and Marcie. Lucy grows frustrated when the students ask questions she cannot answer and when they fail to behave as she expects. Her attempts to teach physical education and other subjects are similarly unsuccessful, while Snoopy and Woodstock create further distractions.

After the students lose confidence in her school, Lucy admits that she does not know how to teach them. Linus helps her recognize that she created the school because she was frightened by the coming changes. The others acknowledge that they are nervous as well and reassure Lucy that they will face the new school together. Lucy comes to appreciate the preparation, patience, and encouragement required of teachers.

On the first day of school, the children meet their new teacher, Miss Halverson, who welcomes them and helps ease their fears. Lucy enters the classroom with her friends, now willing to accept the change. The special concludes by recognizing teachers and the influence they have on their students.

== Voice cast ==
- Etienne Kellici as Charlie Brown
- Isabella Leo as Lucy van Pelt
- Wyatt White as Linus van Pelt
- Terry McGurrin as Snoopy
- Rob Tinkler as Woodstock
- Lexi Perri as Peppermint Patty
- Holly Gorski as Marcie
- Caleb Bellavance as Franklin
- Natasha Nathan as Patty
- Charlie Boyle as Violet Gray
- Jacob Soley as Pig-Pen
- Matthew Mucci as Schroeder
- Jacob Mazeral as José Peterson
- Jackson Reid as Thibault
- Hattie Kragten as Sally Brown

== Production and release ==
Apple TV+ announced the special and released its trailer on July 29, 2022. The company described it as a celebration of educators and a story about children confronting the fear of change.

Lucy's School was directed by Raymond S. Persi and written by Craig Schulz, Bryan Schulz, and Cornelius Uliano. Schulz, Bryan Schulz, and Uliano also served as executive producers with Paige Braddock, Josh Scherba, Stephanie Betts, Amir Nasrabadi, and Anne Loi. James Brown and Timothy Jason Smith produced the special for Peanuts Worldwide and WildBrain. Jeff Morrow composed the score.

The special was released globally on Apple TV+ on August 12, 2022, alongside new episodes from the second season of The Snoopy Show. It has a running time of 38 minutes.

== Reception ==
Stephanie Snyder of Common Sense Media awarded the special four out of five stars. She praised its treatment of back-to-school anxiety, empathy toward children experiencing change, and recognition of the work performed by teachers.

=== Accolades ===
Awards and nominations received by Snoopy Presents: Lucy's School
Award	Year	Category	Result	Ref.
Leo Awards	2023	Best Animation Program	Won	
Children's and Family Emmy Awards	2023	Outstanding Animated Special	Nominated	
