= Snoopy Presents: It's the Small Things, Charlie Brown =

2022 Peanuts streaming animated special

- Genre: Animated television special
- Based on: Peanuts by Charles M. Schulz
- Teleplay by: Josh Saltzman; Craig Schulz; Bryan Schulz; Cornelius Uliano
- Story by: Josh Saltzman
- Directed by: Raymond S. Persi
- Voices of: Tyler Nathan; Terry McGurrin; Hattie Kragten; Rob Tinkler; Lexi Perri; Isabella Leo; Wyatt White
- Theme music composer: Ben Folds
- Ending theme: "It's the Small Things, Charlie Brown"
- Composers: Jeff Morrow; Ben Folds
- Countries of origin: Canada; United States
- Original language: English

Production
- Executive producers: Craig Schulz; Bryan Schulz; Cornelius Uliano; Paige Braddock; Josh Scherba; Stephanie Betts; Amir Nasrabadi; Anne Loi
- Producers: James Brown; Tim Smith
- Running time: 38 minutes
- Production companies: WildBrain Studios; Peanuts Worldwide; Schulz Studio

Original release
- Network: Apple TV+
- Release: April 15, 2022

Related
- Snoopy Presents: For Auld Lang Syne (2021); Snoopy Presents: To Mom (and Dad), With Love (2022)

Snoopy Presents: It's the Small Things, Charlie Brown, or simply It's the Small Things, Charlie Brown, is the 47th Peanuts animated television special. It was the second special to be released exclusively on Apple TV+ on April 15, 2022. It revolves around Sally, who has grown a serious attachment to a dandelion that has grown on the local baseball field, which interrupts Charlie Brown's big game. This is the first special written by Craig and Bryan Schulz, who are the son and grandson of Charles M. Schulz, respectively.

== Plot ==
Charlie Brown is determined to win this year's baseball game, but the opposing team is led by Peppermint Patty, who has won every year since she moved into town. While trying to get a head start on practice, Sally says he promised to let her try out for his team when she turned 5 years old, which she now is. He allows her to join their practice session, but she ultimately proves she has no skill at the sport, meaning she can't join the team.

Peppermint Patty and her team unexpectedly show up at their baseball field to intimidate them. Charlie Brown tells his team not to let it get to them, saying they just need to practice more. But just as they are about to restart practice, Sally notices a dandelion on the pitcher's mound and grows immensely attached to it. This annoys the rest of the team, since she refuses to let them use the pitcher's mound as long as the dandelion is there. Charlie Brown tries to compromise by practicing around her, but this proves unsuccessful.

That night, Charlie Brown goes home, expecting Sally to get bored and leave soon. When he shows up at the field the next morning, he is surprised to see her still by the dandelion. The team becomes even more fed up with both her and Charlie Brown for not having better control of the situation. He turns to Lucy and pays her to talk Sally out of protecting the dandelion. Instead, she becomes inspired by her rebellion and rallies behind her cause. She takes things to the street and inspires all the kids in the neighborhood to help the dandelion, including the rest of Charlie Brown's team (excluding him).

As the baseball field becomes a festival dedicated to the dandelion, Charlie Brown tries once again to convince Sally to get over it, but she sings a song about how important the dandelion is to her ("It's The Small Things, Charlie Brown"). Peppermint Patty and her team arrive at the field, but are surprised by what it has turned into. It is then decided that if they can't play on the field, Charlie Brown's team loses by forfeit. Now blinded by his ambition of victory, he tries to dig up the dandelion. Sally opposes him, leading to a scuffle that accidentally kills the dandelion. Sally and the rest of the kids are saddened by this, and they all leave the field. Though the game can finally start, Charlie Brown decides to put it on hold to find his sister. He catches up to her and apologizes, realizing how much the dandelion meant to her and respecting the community she was able to foster with it. The dandelion then blooms in her hands as she accepts his apology.

The kids are all seen caring for the field, planting more flowers for it. The team gets a new name (The Dandelions), and Sally becomes assistant manager to Charlie Brown. Together, they are determined to beat the opposing team, but it abruptly cuts to a score of 0-100.

== Cast ==
- Tyler Nathan as Charlie Brown
- Terry McGurrin as Snoopy
- Hattie Kragten as Sally
- Rob Tinkler as Woodstock
- Lexi Perri as Peppermint Patty
- Isabella Leo as Lucy
- Wyatt White as Linus
- Holly Gorski as Marcie
- Caleb Bellavance as Franklin
- Natasha Nathan as Patty
- Charlie Boyle as Violet
- Jacob Soley as Pig-Pen
- Maya Misaljevic as Frieda
- Matthew Mucci as Schroeder
- Jackson Reid as Thibault
- Will Bhaneja as Shermy
- Jacob Mazeral as Jose Peterson
- Lucas Nguyen as Floyd
- Beatrice Schneider as Lydia
- Maria Nash as Eudora
- Evan Sheppard-Greenhow as 5

== Production ==
On October 19, 2020, Apple signed a deal to acquire the streaming rights to the Peanuts holiday specials for Apple TV+, including orders for new animated specials to be produced for the service. The release date and title for the special were revealed on February 22, 2022, with the trailer following on March 31.

It's the Small Things, Charlie Brown is the second Peanuts special following It's Arbor Day, Charlie Brown (1976) to address Earth Day.

== Reception ==
=== Accolades ===
Award	Date of ceremony	Category	Recipient(s)	Result	Ref(s).
PGA Awards	December 16, 2022	Outstanding Children's Program	Snoopy Presents: It's The Small Things, Charlie Brown	Nominated	
Children's and Family Emmy Awards	December 11, 2022	Outstanding Original Song	"It's The Small Things, Charlie Brown" – Ben Folds	Nominated	
