= Snoopy Presents: To Mom (and Dad), With Love =

2022 Peanuts streaming animated special

- Genre: Animated television special
- Based on: Peanuts by Charles M. Schulz
- Written by: Alex Galatis
- Directed by: Clay Kaytis
- Starring: Tyler Nathan; Terry McGurrin; Lexi Perri; Rob Tinkler; Isabella Leo; Wyatt White; Hattie Kragten; Holly Gorski
- Composer: Jeff Morrow
- Country of origin: Canada; United States
- Original language: English

Production
- Executive producers: Craig Schulz; Bryan Schulz; Cornelius Uliano; Paige Braddock; Josh Scherba; Stephanie Betts; Anne Loi
- Running time: 38 minutes
- Production companies: WildBrain Studios; Peanuts Worldwide; Schulz Studio

Original release
- Network: Apple TV+
- Release: May 6, 2022

Related
- Snoopy Presents: It's The Small Things, Charlie Brown (2022); Snoopy Presents: Lucy's School (2022)

Snoopy Presents: To Mom (and Dad), With Love, or simply To Mom (and Dad), With Love, is the 48th Peanuts animated special. It was the third Peanuts special released exclusively on Apple TV+ on May 6, 2022. The story follows Peppermint Patty, who feels left out on Mother's Day due to being the only kid in town who doesn't have a mother, but this gives her the idea to celebrate her father.

== Plot ==
Mother's Day is fast approaching, and with it, the Peanuts gang starts making plans on how to celebrate the holiday. All except for Peppermint Patty, who has always felt ambivalent towards it due to not having a mother. She opens up to Marcie about this, noting all the activities her friends associate with mothers are things she did with her father. This gives her the idea to celebrate her dad by giving him a Mother's Day card, but she struggles to find a Mother's Day card specifically for fathers. She and Marcie venture around town looking for gifts, but none satisfy Peppermint Patty.

The constant talk of Mother's Day reminds Woodstock of his mother, whom he has not seen since he left the nest, so he and Snoopy set off on a harrowing journey to find her. They attempt to camp in the woods but are scared off by what they believe to be a wild beast. They eventually make it to the nest where he was born, but learn she has moved away, only having left a note.

Linus tries to write a letter to his mother to show his appreciation, but struggles to find the right words. Lucy tries to make a watercolor painting, but does not like the results, so she decides to make her an arts-and-crafts crown. Charlie Brown and Sally brainstorm things to give their mother. Charlie Brown suggests making breakfast in bed, but their test run proves unsuccessful. Sally proposes getting her an ice cream cake instead, which they procure. However, while talking to Linus and Lucy on the street, Peppermint Patty finally has an outburst over constantly hearing about Mother's Day, startling Charlie Brown and making him lose his hold on the ice cream cake, causing it to land on Lucy and ruining her present. Peppermint Patty runs away in shame.

Peppermint Patty bemoans how she feels left out of her friends' celebrating their mothers, knowing she will never have the same feeling. Marcie reassures her that her feelings are valid, but suggests that she does not need to copy everyone else to show her appreciation to her father. Peppermint Patty decides instead to use the day to just spend time with him and thanks Marcie for her help.

Lucy finally makes an arts-and-crafts card for her mother, but Linus suggests she include a message, showing his letter as an example. Lucy is impressed by his letter, so Linus proposes they combine their gifts. He and Lucy read the letter out loud to their mother at breakfast, while Charlie Brown and Sally successfully prepare breakfast in bed, Woodstock is thankful for Snoopy's help in looking for his mother and gives him a flower to show his appreciation, and Peppermint Patty spends the day hanging out with her dad.

== Cast ==
- Tyler Nathan as Charlie Brown
- Terry McGurrin as Snoopy
- Lexi Perri as Peppermint Patty
- Rob Tinkler as Woodstock / Woodstock's Mom / Woodstock's Siblings
- Isabella Leo as Lucy
- Wyatt White as Linus
- Hattie Kragten as Sally
- Holly Gorski as Marcie
- Caleb Bellavance as Franklin
- Natasha Nathan as Patty
- Charlie Boyle as Violet
- Jacob Soley as Pig-Pen
- Maya Misaljevic as Frieda
- Matthew Mucci as Schroeder

== Production ==
On October 19, 2020, Apple signed a deal to acquire the streaming rights to the Peanuts holiday specials for Apple TV+, including orders for new animated specials to be produced for the service. The release date and title for the special were revealed on February 22, 2022, with the trailer following on April 29.

The special premiered on Apple TV+ on May 6, 2022.

== Reception ==
=== Accolades ===
Award	Date of ceremony	Category	Recipient(s)	Result	Ref(s).
Humanitas Prize	September 9, 2022	Children's Teleplay	Snoopy Presents: To Mom (and Dad), With Love	Nominated	
Children's and Family Emmy Awards	December 11, 2022	Outstanding Music Direction and Composition for an Animated Program	Jeff Morrow	Nominated	
