= Snoopy Presents: One-of-a-Kind Marcie =

2023 Peanuts animated special

- Promotional poster
- Genre: Children & Family; Comedy; Slice of life
- Based on: Peanuts by Charles M. Schulz
- Written by: Betsy Walters
- Directed by: Raymond S. Persi
- Voices of: Arianna McDonald; Lexi Perri; Etienne Kellici
- Music by: Jeff Morrow
- Countries of origin: Canada United States
- Original language: English

Production
- Executive producers: Craig Schulz; Bryan Schulz; Cornelius Uliano; Paige Braddock; Josh Scherba; Stephanie Betts; Logan McPherson
- Producer: James Brown
- Running time: 39 minutes
- Production companies: Peanuts Worldwide; WildBrain Studios; Schulz Studio

Original release
- Network: Apple TV+
- Release: August 18, 2023

Related
- Snoopy Presents: Lucy's School (2022); Snoopy Presents: Welcome Home, Franklin (2024)

Snoopy Presents: One-of-a-Kind Marcie, known simply as One-of-a-Kind Marcie, is the 50th Peanuts animated special. It was the fifth Peanuts special released exclusively on Apple TV+ on August 18, 2023. It is the first Peanuts special to center around the character Marcie. The special follows Marcie being unexpectedly elected class president, and her struggle with being thrust into the spotlight and coping with the expectations of her new position. The special was released on Apple TV+ on August 18, 2023 to unanimous critical acclaim; it won the Award for Best Animated Special Production at the 51st Annie Awards.

== Plot ==
Marcie helps Peppermint Patty practice for the upcoming school golf tournament, acting as her caddie, as five younger kids spectate. This practice includes getting a ball out of a bunker by "carrying the sand". Later, at school, Peppermint Patty admires the school's championship cup, prematurely celebrating her own victory, while Marcie comments on the lack of mention of the caddies in the accolades. Franklin then reminds the students to vote in the upcoming student council election, as his term as class president is nearly done. As other students announce their candidacies, Peppermint Patty remarks that Marcie would make a good student council president due to her helpful nature. Marcie finds the prospect unappealing due to the busy, public-facing, and fast-paced nature of the job.

As the day continues, Marcie encounters various problems around the school. Mulling over these problems in her room after school, Marcie resolves to solve the problems herself. However, when she attempts to implement her solutions as the problems arise again the next day, her shyness and fear of public speaking prevent her. She later seeks out Lucy's advice at her psychiatric booth on how to be more assertive. Lucy's advice is unhelpful, and Marcie eventually rushes off to Peppermint Patty's qualifying golf game.

With Marcie's help, Peppermint Patty wins, and they advance to the championship. As Franklin congratulates Peppermint Patty, he also highlights Marcie as her caddie; when asked to make a public statement on the game, Marcie is overcome with anxiety, deferring to Peppermint Patty before running away. She then encounters Charlie Brown, and the two have a conversation about Marcie's inability to assert herself or take charge. She eventually resolves to approach problems in her own way: implementing solutions ahead of time, so as to avoid doing so in the public eye. As the results of the student council election that day are tallied, Marcie is elected class president through write-in votes due to her improvements to the school. Dreading the nature of the job, Marcie runs away in panic, deciding to stay in her room to avoid the job.

As the championship game begins, Peppermint Patty conscripts Charlie Brown to be her caddie in Marcie's absence, but he does a terrible job. Seeing that Peppermint Patty will lose if this continues, Carlin—one of the younger kids spectating their practice earlier—runs to Marcie's house to get her. Marcie resists, as showing up will mean giving a speech. Carlin helps her see that she doesn't need to be a leader if she doesn't want to, and can still help in less obvious ways. Marcie heads to the game, and helps Peppermint Patty turn it in her favor. At the last possible stroke, Peppermint Patty wins by "carrying the sand" once again.

After the game, when asked to give her first speech as class president, Marcie asks for time to prepare what to say. In her speech, she resigns as class president, acknowledging that she is better suited to working in the background. Having received the second-most votes, Pig-Pen is then inaugurated as class president, with Marcie continuing to help from the sidelines.

== Voice cast ==
- Arianna McDonald as Marcie
- Lexi Perri as Peppermint Patty
- Etienne Kellici as Charlie Brown
- Antonina Battrick as Carlin
- Isabella Leo as Lucy / Cry Baby Boobie / Tapioca Pudding
- Wyatt White as Linus
- Caleb Bellavance as Franklin
- Lucien Duncan-Reid as Pig-Pen
- Natasha Nathan as Patty
- Charlie Boyle as Violet
- Maya Misaljevic as Frieda
- Terry McGurrin as Snoopy
- Rob Tinkler as Woodstock
- Will Bhaneja as Shermy / Floyd
- Jackson Reid as Harold Angel / Thibault / Joe Richkid / Larry
- Jacob Mazeral as Jose Peterson
- Emily Mitchell as Ruby
- Joshua Obasi as Milo
- Owen Ross as Leland

Section references:

== Production ==
One-of-a-Kind Marcie was announced on May 18, 2023 for Apple TV+, alongside other Peanuts content. Billed as the first special focusing on Marcie, it was directed by Raymond S. Persi, written by Betsy Walters, and executive produced by Craig Schulz, Bryan Schulz, Cornelius Uliano, Paige Braddock, Josh Scherba, Stephanie Betts, and Logan McPherson, with cognitive scientist Scott Barry Kaufman serving as the special's "introvert consultant". In July, an exclusive preview clip was shown at San Diego Comic-Con, with the trailer being released on August 2. On August 14, a clip was released onto Apple TV's YouTube channel, and on August 17, another clip was released on YouTube via Screen Rant. The special was released on August 18, 2023.

== Reception ==
=== Critical response ===
One-of-a-Kind Marcie received unanimously positive reviews. Common Sense Media's Diondra K. Brown rated the special 4/5 stars, praising its positive messaging and describing it as "a great watch for viewers of all ages." Paste's Gillian Bennett scored the special 8.5/10, commending it for how much it added to Marcie's character in its short run time, describing it as "a pleasant surprise when forty minutes had passed feeling like fifteen." CBR's Sam Stone praised the art and animation style, which he called "gorgeous and vibrant" and "warm and inviting". MovieWeb's Caroline Miller rated the special 4.5/5, recommending it to viewers who "tune into Peanuts for the feel-good energy rather than the sadder or meaner stuff".

=== Accolades ===
Award	Date of ceremony	Category	Recipient(s)	Result	Ref(s).
Annie Awards	February 17, 2024	Best Animated Special Production	Snoopy Presents: One-of-a-Kind Marcie	Won	
Canadian Screen Awards	May 28–31, 2024	Best Animated Program or Series	Snoopy Presents: One-of-a-Kind Marcie	Nominated	
Canadian Screen Awards	May 28–31, 2024	Best Sound in an Animated Program or Series	Gregorio Gomez, Greg Stewart, Angelo Nicoloyannis, John Franco, Bonnie Lambie, and Rick Senechal	Nominated	
Children's and Family Emmy Awards	March 15, 2025	Outstanding Animated Special	Snoopy Presents: One-of-a-Kind Marcie	Nominated	
Children's and Family Emmy Awards	March 15, 2025	Outstanding Younger Voice Performer in an Animated or Preschool Animated Program	Arianna McDonald	Nominated	
Leo Awards	July 7, 2024	Best Animation Program	Snoopy Presents: One-of-a-Kind Marcie	Won	
Leo Awards	July 7, 2024	Best Direction Animation Program	Kaitlin Sutherland and Raymond Persi	Nominated	
Leo Awards	July 7, 2024	Best Sound Animation Program	Gregorio Gomez, Greg Stewart, Angelo Nicoloyannis, Rick Senechal, John Franco, Bonnie Lambie, and Leyon Takasaki-Gort	Nominated	
