= Snoopy Presents: Welcome Home, Franklin =

Peanuts streaming animated special

- Based on: Peanuts by Charles M. Schulz
- Screenplay by: Robb Armstrong; Craig Schulz; Bryan Schulz; Cornelius Uliano
- Story by: Robb Armstrong; Scott Montgomery
- Directed by: Raymond S. Persi
- Voices of: Caleb Bellavance; Etienne Kellici; Isabella Leo; Wyatt White; Lexi Perri; Hattie Kragten; Arianna McDonald; Lucien Duncan-Reid; Cash Allen-Martin; Natasha Nathan; Charlie Boyle; Will Bhaneja; Maya Misaljevic; Jackson Reid; Jacob Mazeral; Terry McGurrin; Robert Tinkler
- Music by: Jeff Morrow
- Countries of origin: Canada; United States
- Original language: English

Production
- Executive producers: Craig Schulz; Bryan Schulz; Cornelius Uliano; Paige Braddock; Josh Scherba; Stephanie Betts; Logan McPherson
- Running time: 39 minutes
- Production companies: WildBrain Studios; Peanuts Worldwide; Schulz Studio

Original release
- Network: Apple TV+
- Release: February 16, 2024

Related
- Snoopy Presents: One-of-a-Kind Marcie (2023); Snoopy Presents: A Summer Musical (2025)

Snoopy Presents: Welcome Home, Franklin or simply Welcome Home, Franklin is the 51st Peanuts animated special. It was the sixth Peanuts special released exclusively on Apple TV+ on February 16, 2024. It is the first special to center on the African-American character of Franklin Armstrong. The character, introduced in the comic strip on July 31, 1968, was the first Black character in the strip. The special was released during Black History Month of 2024.

The plot revolves around Franklin, the son of a military family, moving to a new town and struggling to make friends before ultimately partnering and bonding with Charlie Brown over racing in a Soap Box Derby.

== Plot ==
Franklin Armstrong's family moves from town to town due to his father being in the army. Upon settling in a new one, Franklin decides to once again make friends, only to come across the likes of Linus, Lucy, Pig-Pen, and Snoopy, and becomes unnerved by their character quirks. He heads to the beach, where he has a brief interaction with Charlie Brown; the two appear to become good friends, though Charlie Brown is called away by his mother.

Later, the kids learn of a soapbox derby with the prize being a trophy and a year of free pizza. All the kids pick a partner, with Charlie Brown and Franklin being the last two, thus forcing the two to pick one another. While getting supplies, Franklin is told by Lucy that Charlie Brown is not a great partner, but he pays no mind. The boys quickly become good friends and share their common interests with one another. Franklin reveals that he wants to be an astronaut, while Charlie says he wants to be a baseball player because he would get to go to different cities, something that Franklin is solemnly too familiar with.

Franklin and Charlie Brown test out their soapbox, but the latter nervously toggles with the brakes. This causes them to crash, and the two get into an argument. In the middle of the night, the two go back to their broken soapbox and make up, deciding to fix it to the best of their ability together.

The day of the race comes, and Franklin and Charlie Brown end up doing well, only for a runaway ice cream cart to come and block the road. Charlie Brown and Franklin knock the cart out of the way, but crash, with Lucy and Schroeder coming in first. Charlie Brown is upset that they lost, but Franklin explains that he wanted to win more than anything so that he could be accepted by the gang. Realizing what the whole point of the race was, the boys pick up their soapboxes' remains and head towards the finish line with all the kids except Lucy cheering them on. Everyone thanks the two for their sacrifice as a reluctant Lucy invites everyone to have pizza with her and Schroeder after she gives her respect to Franklin.

Now, having been accepted as part of the gang, Franklin happily enjoys pizza with Charlie Brown and the rest of the Peanuts gang. During the pizza party, he makes an announcement: his dad has been assigned to a new job. Everyone is initially dismayed, thinking that Franklin will have to move again, but Franklin explains that the job will not require him to move and that he can stay and will no longer need to move constantly. He and the Peanuts gang celebrate and resume their pizza party.

== Cast ==
- Caleb Bellavance as Franklin Armstrong
- Etienne Kellici as Charlie Brown
- Isabella Leo as Lucy Van Pelt
- Wyatt White as Linus Van Pelt
- Lexi Perri as Peppermint Patty
- Hattie Kragten as Sally Brown
- Arianna McDonald as Marcie
- Lucien Duncan-Reid as Pig-Pen
- Cash Allen-Martin as Schroeder
- Terry McGurrin as Snoopy
- Robert Tinkler as Woodstock
- Natasha Nathan as Patty
- Charlie Boyle as Violet
- Will Bhaneja as Shermy
- Maya Misaljevic as Frieda
- Jackson Reid as Harold Angel
- Jacob Mazeral as Jose Peterson

== Production ==
As a permanent character of the comic strip, Franklin is also a frequent character in the animated Peanuts television specials and movies. Unlike most characters, however, he did not appear in animation until the 1970s, with his debut being a silent role in the 1972 movie Snoopy Come Home at Snoopy's farewell party. His first speaking role is in the 1973 special There's No Time for Love, Charlie Brown, in which he is voiced by Todd Barbee.

On May 18, 2023, Apple announced they were making two new original Peanuts specials. The release date and title for the special were revealed on January 11, 2024.

In February 2024, a trailer for Snoopy Presents: Welcome Home, Franklin, a special revolving around Franklin's introduction to Charlie Brown and his friends, was released. The special was released on February 16, 2024 on Apple TV+. Franklin's last name is again given as Armstrong. The character was incidentally named after Robb Armstrong, who lists Charles M. Schulz as one of his influences and heroes, saying that he started drawing sketches of Charlie Brown at age five. Schulz gave his Franklin the surname, Armstrong, as part of the 1994 animated television special You're in the Super Bowl, Charlie Brown.

A scene early in the program where Franklin's initial meeting with Charlie Brown occurs at a beach, is a callback to their similar first meeting in the comic strip. Another scene references a retrospectively awkward moment from the 1973 special, A Charlie Brown Thanksgiving, where Franklin is sitting alone on one side of a table while other characters are together on the other side; in the new film, Franklin is invited to join the rest of the gang on the other side of the table.

== Reception ==
=== Critical response ===
Welcome Home, Franklin received praise for putting a more positive spin on a controversial scene from the 1973 special A Charlie Brown Thanksgiving, segregating Franklin from the rest of the Peanuts characters sitting on one side of the dinner table while the rest sit on the opposite side.

=== Accolades ===
Award	Date of ceremony	Category	Recipient(s)	Result	Ref(s).
TCA Awards	July 12, 2024	Outstanding Achievement in Children's Programming	Snoopy Presents: Welcome Home, Franklin	Nominated	
Humanitas Prize	September 12, 2024	Children's Teleplay	Snoopy Presents: Welcome Home, Franklin	Nominated	
Annie Awards	February 8, 2025	Outstanding Achievement for Storyboarding in an Animated Television / Broadcast Production	David Lux	Nominated	
NAACP Image Awards	February 22, 2025	Outstanding Animated Series	Snoopy Presents: Welcome Home, Franklin	Nominated	
Children's and Family Emmy Awards	March 15, 2025	Outstanding Editing for an Animated Program	Mat Garneau and Steven Liu	Nominated	
Children's and Family Emmy Awards	March 15, 2025	Individual Achievement in Animation	David Lux (Storyboard)	Won	
Canadian Screen Awards	May 31, 2025	Best Animated Program or Series	Snoopy Presents: Welcome Home, Franklin	Nominated	
Canadian Screen Awards	May 31, 2025	Best Writing in an Animated Program or Series	Scott Montgomery, Robb Armstrong, Craig Schulz, Bryan Schulz and Cornelius Uliano	Won	
