= Snoopy Presents: There's No Place Like Home, Snoopy =

Peanuts streaming animated special

- Based on: Peanuts by Charles M. Schulz
- Written by: Rob Hoegee
- Directed by: Rob Boutilier; Ridd Sorensen
- Voices of: Riley Vargas; Terry McGurrin
- Music by: Jeff Morrow
- Countries of origin: Canada; United States
- Original language: English

Production
- Executive producers: Josh Scherba; Stephanie Betts; Logan McPherson; Paige Braddock; Chris Bracco; Mark Evestaff
- Producer: Kimberly Small
- Running time: 31 minutes
- Production companies: WildBrain Studios; Peanuts Worldwide; Schulz Studio

Original release
- Network: Apple TV
- Release: July 31, 2026

Related
- Snoopy Presents: A Summer Musical (2025)

Snoopy Presents: There's No Place Like Home, Snoopy or simply There's No Place Like Home, Snoopy is the 53rd Peanuts animated special. It is the eighth Peanuts special released on Apple TV on July 31, 2026. The plot follows Snoopy after his doghouse is accidentally sold during Charlie Brown and Sally's yard sale. With Charlie Brown's help, he sets off to find his house and learns what makes a house feel like home.

== Cast ==
- Riley Vargas as Charlie Brown
- Terry McGurrin as Snoopy
- Grace Nicolaou-Wood as Sally Brown
- Jo-Hannah Atchison as Lucy Van Pelt
- Noah Paisley as Milo
- Robert Tinkler as Woodstock
- Kitai O’Garro as Franklin
- Josephine Nisbett as Marcie
- Lexi Perri as Peppermint Patty
- Athan Giazitzidis as Linus Van Pelt
- Diego Whalen as Rerun Van Pelt
- Lorenzo Bezzina as Pig-Pen
- Essix Uy as Leland
- Romeo Luminati as Austin
- Genevieve Duncan-Reid as Ruby
- Addison Wagman as Violet
- Ariel Ollivierre as Patty

== Production ==
Apple announced this special on May 19, 2026, alongside the second season of Camp Snoopy; both were announced to debut in July 2026. Jeff Morrow was composer for the special, and Allen Stone wrote an original song, "Home, Where Your Heart Found Me." The special was animated using Toon Boom Harmony and was worked on by the core team from The Snoopy Show.
