= The Peanuts Movie: Snoopy's Grand Adventure =

2015 video game

- Developer: Behaviour Santiago
- Publisher: Activision
- Director: David Williams
- Designers: Macarena Francia; Louis Manning
- Programmers: Daniel Córdova; George Laskowsky
- Artists: Marco Montecinos; Felipe Montecinos
- Writer: Jason Cooper
- Composer: Lee Blaske
- Engine: Unity
- Platforms: Nintendo 3DS; PlayStation 4 Wii U Xbox 360; Xbox One
- Release: NA: November 3, 2015; PAL: November 6, 2015
- Genre: Platformer
- Modes: Single-player, multiplayer

The Peanuts Movie: Snoopy's Grand Adventure is a side-scrolling platform video game developed by Behaviour Santiago and published by Activision as a tie-in to the 2015 animated film The Peanuts Movie. The game was released on November 3, 2015 in North America, and November 6, 2015 in Europe and Australia for the Xbox 360 and most eighth-generation platforms, becoming the first Peanuts video game released on a Nintendo platform internationally since Snoopy Tennis in 2001.

== Gameplay ==
The player plays as Snoopy and can play as Woodstock in co-op to help find Charlie Brown and his friends. In order to do this, the player must go through several levels, each one ending at Snoopy's Doghouse. Along the way, the player will collect Jelly Beans, use various costumes, and find members of the Beagle Scouts. The player is able to customize Snoopy and Woodstock.

== Story ==
Charlie Brown and his friends play hide and seek in his backyard while unintentionally leaving a trail of jelly beans. Snoopy finds the trail and follows them in order to locate the gang.

Throughout the game, he goes through hiding spots that the gang has hidden. However, due to Snoopy's crazy imagination, he believes them to be amazing and exciting places like the Amazon, space, Aztec temple, etc. He then finds Peppermint Patty, Linus, Lucy Van Pelt, Franklin, Pig-Pen, Schroeder, and believing him to be the last kid standing. Charlie Brown believes he won, but unfortunately finds that The Little Red Haired Girl won instead as Charlie came out before she came out. Despite the fact that he lost (again), he is happy that she smiled at him and congratulated him. Schroeder then plays the theme for the Peanuts, and everybody dances.

== Reception ==
Reception

Aggregate scores
Aggregator	Score
GameRankings	(PS4) 65.00% (XONE) 63.56% (WiiU) 60.00%
Metacritic	(PS4) 59/100 (XONE) 60/100

Review scores
Publication	Score
Nintendo Life	6/10
Official Xbox Magazine (UK)	4/10
IGN Italy	6.7/10
NF Magazine	6/10

The game received generally "mixed or average" reviews according to the review aggregation website Metacritic. At GameRankings the PS4 version holds a score of 65.00% while the Xbox One version holds a 63.56% score and the Wii U version has a score of 60.00%.
