= Kragten =

Kragten may refer to:

- Hattie Kragten (born 2007), Canadian actress
- Isaac Kragten (born 2002), Canadian actor
