= Lovable loser =

Character archetype

The lovable loser is a character archetype portrayed as a sympathetic, likable, or well-meaning person for whom bad luck continually prevents their various efforts from succeeding, and from obtaining the things they feel will bring them happiness, particularly an idealized true love.

== Description ==
Lovable losers are often defined by ambitions exceeding their capabilities, and by their over-zealous, and sometimes self-defeating, efforts to obtain their desires. They are prone to fall for get-rich-quick schemes, and advertised shortcuts to finding wealth, success, or love, and to act impulsively in the pursuit of these things, but at the same time may be prone to act ethically and selflessly, resisting efforts to lure them into behavior that would actually harm others. They are often depicted as falling into a dynamic where their friends are disdainful of their efforts, or offer bad advice or other counterproductive help.

== Usage ==
=== In fiction ===
Examples of lovable losers in media include Charlie Brown, the main character of the Peanuts comic strip by Charles M. Schulz, whose exploits in futility include an inability to fly a kite without getting it stuck in a tree, never receiving valentines from anyone in his school class, being the pitcher on a winless baseball team, and repeatedly being convinced by Lucy to try to kick a football, only for her to yank it away at the last second; Chandler Bing on Friends, who for most of the show's run was unable to find romance (in contrast with his roommate, Joey Tribbiani, who easily fell into meaningless relationships); and Andy, the main character in The 40-Year-Old Virgin, who must deal with overly forward efforts by his friends and coworkers who want to help him lose his virginity.

At one time it was noted that "[a]lmost every top-rated series has a regular, dependable loser; a patsy who always gets the short end of the stick, a fall guy who is left with egg on his face". It has been argued that "the lovable loser plays a big part in the American dream", because "the lovable loser--as long as he is on the side of the angels--rescues the country from its excesses, and thus represents an indispensable national trait".

=== In real life ===
In sports, the phrase specifically refers to athletes or sports teams that, despite their best efforts, are consistently unable to win. The term was particularly applied to the Chicago Cubs baseball team for a long stretch of their existence, during which a World Series championship eluded the team from 1908 until 2016. A 1961 college football game preview predicting a loss for Indiana University described the team's head coach, Phil Dickens as a "big lovable loser". Golfer Sam Snead, who had close losses in a number of golf tournaments, was characterized as a lovable loser in 1963, although he was a winner of three of the four major golf tournaments, which included three PGA Championships. A 1963 Chicago Tribune headline named the New York Mets lovable losers. The Mets went on to win the World Series six years later. In cycling, French rider Raymond Poulidor has been described as a lovable loser: he earned the nickname "the eternal second" as he never won the Tour de France or wore the yellow jersey, despite scoring three runner-up finishes and five third places, and was eclipsed by his rival and compatriot Jacques Anquetil. Nevertheless, he achieved great popularity with the French public.
