= Craig Schulz =

American producer and screenwriter (born 1953)

- Born: Craig Frederick Schulz; January 22, 1953 (age 73); Minneapolis, Minnesota, U.S.
- Spouse: Judy Davis
- Children: 2
- Father: Charles M. Schulz

Craig Frederick Schulz (born January 22, 1953) is an American producer, screenwriter, motocross racer, pilot, and instructor. He has often worked on adaptations of the Peanuts comic strip, created by his father, Charles M. Schulz.

== Life and career ==
Craig Schulz was born in Minneapolis on January 22, 1953, to Peanuts cartoonist Charles M. Schulz and Joyce Halverson. He has four siblings, including half sister Meredith Hodges. He moved with his family to Sebastopol, California, in 1958, and later to Santa Rosa, California, in 1969.

In 1971, Schulz became a motocross racer, and competed in hundreds of races across the United States. Schulz's father was inspired by his son to create You're a Good Sport, Charlie Brown, which aired in 1975. Schulz later became a flight instructor, and is a certified helicopter pilot. In 1989, he made headlines when he flew his father's private jet to Mexico, escorting detectives to arrest spree killer Ramon Salcido.

Schulz serves as president and CEO of Charles M. Schulz Creative Associates, which manages the licensing for the Peanuts brand. In 2008, Schulz produced a series of online shorts, Peanuts Motion Comics, based on the comic strip. Schulz and Stephan Pastis co-wrote the 2011 special Happiness Is a Warm Blanket, Charlie Brown, the first Peanuts special produced with no direct involvement from Schulz's father; Schulz and Pastis also adapted the special into a graphic novel of the same name. Beginning in 2019, Schulz began producing several new Peanuts specials and shows for Apple TV+, for which he has been nominated for two Daytime Emmy Awards.

In 2011, Schulz appeared as a guest judge on Food Network Challenge, in an episode themed around Charlie Brown Thanksgiving cakes.

Schulz was a producer and co-writer of The Peanuts Movie (2015). In September 2023, Schulz expressed interest in another Peanuts feature film, which was announced in November, with Schulz returning to co-produce and co-write the script.

== Personal life ==
Schulz lives in Santa Rosa, with his wife, Judy. He has two children, and has worked with his son Bryan on Peanuts projects.

== Filmography ==
Year	Title	Producer	Writer	Other	Notes
1963	A Boy Named Charlie Brown			Yes	Documentary
2008	Peanuts Motion Comics			Yes	Creative consultant
2011	Happiness Is a Warm Blanket, Charlie Brown	Yes	Yes		
2015	The Peanuts Movie	Yes	Yes		
2019	Peanuts in Space: Secrets of Apollo 10	Yes			Documentary
2019	Snoopy in Space	Yes			
2021	Who Are You, Charlie Brown?	Yes			Documentary
2021	The Snoopy Show	Yes			
2021	Snoopy Presents: For Auld Lang Syne	Yes			
2022	Snoopy Presents: It's the Small Things, Charlie Brown	Yes	Yes		
2022	Snoopy Presents: To Mom (and Dad), With Love	Yes			
2022	Snoopy Presents: Lucy's School	Yes	Yes		
2023	Snoopy Presents: One-of-a-Kind Marcie	Yes			
2024	Snoopy Presents: Welcome Home, Franklin	Yes	Yes		
2025	Snoopy Presents: A Summer Musical	Yes	Yes		
