= The Peanuts Movie =

2015 animated film by Blue Sky Studios

- Theatrical release poster
- Directed by: Steve Martino
- Screenplay by: Craig Schulz; Bryan Schulz; Cornelius Uliano
- Based on: Peanuts by Charles M. Schulz
- Produced by: Craig Schulz; Bryan Schulz; Cornelius Uliano; Paul Feig; Michael J. Travers
- Starring: Noah Schnapp; Hadley Belle Miller; Mariel Sheets; Alex Garfin; Francesca Angelucci Capaldi; Troy "Trombone Shorty" Andrews; Kristin Chenoweth; Bill Melendez
- Cinematography: Renato Falcão
- Edited by: Randy Trager
- Music by: Christophe Beck
- Production companies: 20th Century Fox Animation; Blue Sky Studios; Feigco Entertainment; Peanuts Worldwide
- Distributed by: 20th Century Fox
- Release dates: November 1, 2015 (New York City); November 6, 2015 (United States)
- Running time: 88 minutes
- Country: United States
- Language: English
- Budget: $99 million
- Box office: $250.1 million

The Peanuts Movie (Note: Also known in some countries as Snoopy and Charlie Brown: The Peanuts Movie) is a 2015 American animated comedy film based on Charles M. Schulz's eponymous comic strip. Directed by Steve Martino from a screenplay by Cornelius Uliano and Craig and Bryan Schulz (Schulz's son and grandson, respectively), the film stars the voices of Noah Schnapp as Charlie Brown and, via archival recordings, Bill Melendez as Snoopy and Woodstock. It was produced by 20th Century Fox Animation and Blue Sky Studios, and distributed by 20th Century Fox. A slice-of-life comedy, the film sees Charlie Brown navigating the trials of his everyday school life as he tries to improve his odds with his love interest, the Little Red-Haired Girl, while Snoopy writes a book portraying a daring and heroic quest in which he is a World War I Flying Ace trying to save his fellow pilot and love interest, Fifi, from the Red Baron and his cronies. It was the fifth full-length Peanuts film and the first since Bon Voyage, Charlie Brown (and Don't Come Back!!).

Development of the film began in 2006 which was six years after the death of Charles Schulz and the final release of the last Peanuts comic strip. Craig Schulz, a son of Charles, pitched a film idea to his son, Bryan Schulz. 20th Century Fox and Blue Sky Studios announced development of a computer-animated film in October 2012, a year after Happiness is a Warm Blanket, Charlie Brown, with Martino directing, due to his faithfulness to the style of Dr. Seuss in Horton Hears a Who! (2008), also produced by Blue Sky. Numerous elements from the comic strip were featured in the film, such as Charlie Brown's skating pond, his house, "the wall" and Lucy's psychiatrist booth, as well as the Snoopy and Woodstock voice tracks from Bill Melendez. The score was composed by Christophe Beck, with additional soundtrack contributions by Meghan Trainor and David Benoit.

The Peanuts Movie premiered in New York City on November 1, 2015, and was released in the United States five days later on November 6. The film received generally positive reviews from critics and grossed $250 million worldwide against a $99 million budget to become the 7th highest-grossing animated film of 2015. It received nominations for the Annie Award for Best Animated Feature, the Critics' Choice Movie Award for Best Animated Feature and was the first Blue Sky Studios film to be nominated for a Golden Globe Award for Best Animated Feature Film.

== Plot ==
The main Peanuts characters as seen in the closing shot of the film (which later turns into a comic strip frame as Schulz signs his signature on the bottom) (L to R): Franklin, Marcie, Peppermint Patty, Linus, Charlie Brown, Snoopy, Lucy, Woodstock, Sally, Schroeder, and Pig-Pen.

Charlie Brown, a clumsy and socially awkward young boy, is often looked down on by his peers, especially Lucy Van Pelt, who views him as a failure; his only means of emotional support are his anthropomorphic dog, Snoopy and Lucy's younger brother, Linus. One day, Charlie Brown is smitten with a new red-haired girl in his class (whom he nicknames the "Little Red-Haired Girl"). Viewing this as an opportunity for a fresh start, Charlie Brown decides to change himself in order to get the Little Red-Haired Girl to notice him. On that same day, Linus brings in a model Red Baron triplane for show and tell. Charlie Brown tries to test it out, but when he touches the propeller, the plane flies everywhere, causing havoc.

Charlie Brown enters a talent show at his school, planning to perform a magic show act. On the day of the show, however, Charlie Brown decides to sacrifice his act in order to help his sister Sally with hers, which gives her a standing ovation, yet causes him to be humiliated in front of the entire school. Later, Charlie Brown practices for a school dance, hoping that he can impress the Little Red-Haired Girl with his moves. At the dance, Charlie Brown attracts praise for his skills until he accidentally causes a sprinkler to be set off, causing the dance to be cut short.

The next day, Charlie Brown is partnered with the Little Red-Haired Girl to write a book report. When she is called away for a week to deal with a family illness, Charlie Brown decides to write the report alone, on the collegiate-level novel War and Peace by Leo Tolstoy, to which he writes a comprehensive report. At the same time, Charlie Brown finds he is the only student to get a perfect score on a standardized test taken earlier that school year. His friends and the other students congratulate him, and his popularity begins to climb.

However, when he goes to accept a medal at a school assembly, Charlie Brown learns that his test papers were accidentally mixed up with Peppermint Patty's, prompting him to reveal the mistake and decline the medal, thus becoming unpopular again. Subsequently, his book report is accidentally shredded by the model plane, causing Charlie Brown and the Little Red-Haired Girl to fail the assignment and making the former give up on his attempts to improve himself.

Meanwhile, Snoopy writes a novel about his World War I Flying Ace persona trying to save his girlfriend Fifi from the Red Baron with help from his bird friend Woodstock, using the key events and situations surrounding Charlie Brown as inspiration to develop his story. Snoopy, in the end, manages to defeat the Red Baron and save Fifi.

On the last day of school, Charlie Brown is surprised when the Little Red-Haired Girl chooses him for a pen pal (as part of a school project during the summer). Linus encourages Charlie Brown to tell the Little Red-Haired Girl how he feels about her before she leaves for the summer. Working up his courage, Charlie Brown meets the Little Red-Haired Girl just as she is about to leave on the bus for summer camp and asks her why she has chosen him in spite of his previous failed attempts to try and impress her. The Little Red-Haired Girl explains to him that she admires his compassion, honesty, and bravery. This causes the other kids, including Lucy, to congratulate Charlie Brown, finally accepting him as a true friend. Meanwhile, the model plane finally runs out of batteries and falls into a lake.

== Voice cast ==
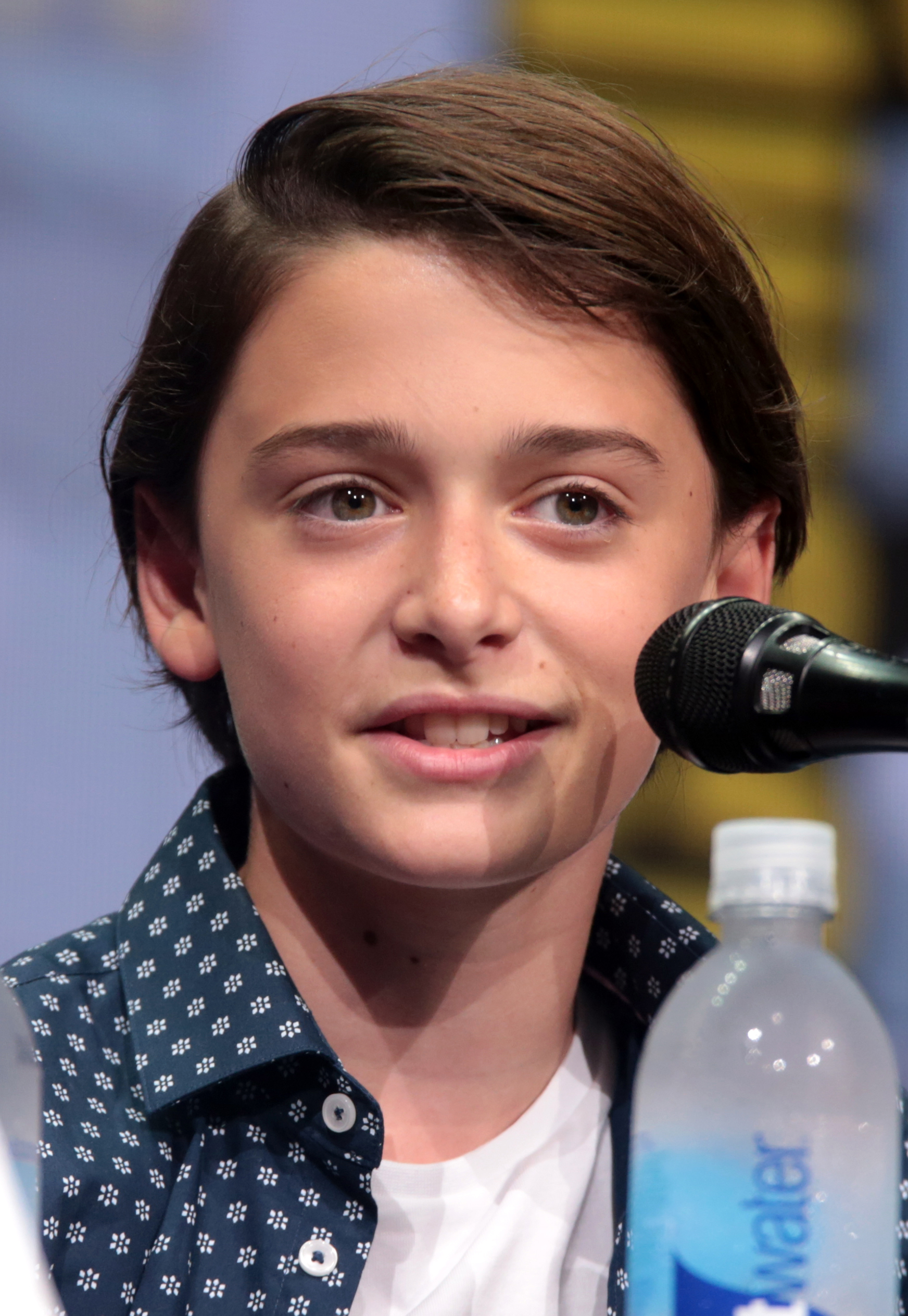
Noah Schnapp voiced Charlie Brown
- Noah Schnapp as Charlie Brown
- Hadley Belle Miller as Lucy
- Mariel Sheets as Sally
- Alex Garfin as Linus
- Francesca Angelucci Capaldi as the Little Red-Haired Girl and Frieda. Describing the Little Red-Haired Girl, Capaldi says: "She's very nice and kind and has a great heart. She really does like Charlie Brown, but he has no idea, because he's shy and awkward."
- Venus Omega Schultheis as Peppermint Patty
- Rebecca Bloom as Marcie
- Marelik "Mar Mar" Walker as Franklin
- Noah Johnston as Schroeder
- Anastasia Bredikhina as Patty
- Madisyn Shipman as Violet
- AJ Tecce as Pig-Pen
- Micah Revelli as Little Kid
- William "Alex" Wunsch as Shermy
- Troy "Trombone Shorty" Andrews as Miss Othmar and the Little Red-Haired Girl's mother. Andrews' trombone provided their "wah-wah" voices, along with the voices for other adult characters in the film.
- Kristin Chenoweth as Fifi, Snoopy's love interest. Chenoweth created "a series of conversational-like sounds" to create Fifi's language, using Melendez's Snoopy recordings as a guide, and making his sounds more feminine. Chenoweth previously starred as Sally in a 1999 Broadway version of the Peanuts musical You're a Good Man, Charlie Brown, for which she earned a Drama Desk Awards and a Tony Award.
- Bill Melendez as Snoopy, Snoopy's Siblings and Woodstock (from archival recordings). Woodstock and his bird friends are part of Snoopy's Beagle Scouts, who serve as the World War I Flying Ace's (Snoopy's) repair crew.

== Production ==
=== Development ===
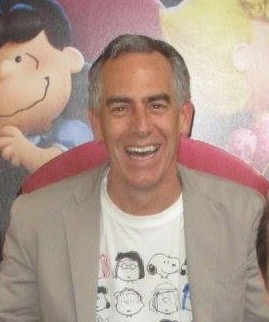
Director Steve Martino presented the film in the work-in-progress session at the 2015 Annecy International Animated Film Festival.

In 2006, six years after the release of the last original Peanuts strip, as well as the death of creator Charles M. Schulz, his son Craig Schulz came up with an idea for a new Peanuts film, which he showed to his screenwriter son Bryan Schulz. "I was happy to show my son," Craig said. "He showed me how to make it bigger—how to blow it up more—and he helped me put in structure." When presenting their film to studios, Craig stipulated that the film remain under Schulz control, saying, "We need[ed] to have absolute quality control and keep it under Dad's legacy... You can't bring people in from the outside and expect them to understand Peanuts." On October 9, 2012, it was announced that 20th Century Fox and Blue Sky Studios were developing an animated feature film based on the strip, with Steve Martino directing from the screenplay by Craig Schulz, Bryan Schulz, and Cornelius Uliano. Craig, Bryan, and Uliano also produced. Craig, stating there is no one "more protective of the comic strip than myself," chose Martino as director because he showed faithfulness to literature in his adaptation of Dr. Seuss' Horton Hears a Who!.

On the film's plot, Martino said: "Here's where I lean thematically. I want to go through this journey... Charlie Brown is that guy who, in the face of repeated failure, picks himself back up and tries again. That's no small task. I have kids who aspire to be something big and great... a star football player or on Broadway. I think what Charlie Brown is—what I hope to show in this film—is the everyday qualities of perseverance... to pick yourself back up with a positive attitude—that's every bit as heroic... as having a star on the Walk of Fame or being a star on Broadway. That's the [story's] core. This is a feature film story that has a strong dramatic drive, and takes its core ideas from the strip." In addition to receiving the rights to use Bill Melendez's voice for Snoopy and Woodstock, Martino was also able to get the rights to archive music from previous Peanuts specials. Classic locations are featured, such as Charlie Brown's skating pond, his house, "the wall" and Lucy's psychiatrist booth, each retaining the "eternal look of the strip." Additionally, despite being outdated technology, rotary phones and typewriters are seen, as well as Lucy's psychiatrist booth still costing a nickel. Adult characters' "wah-wah" voices are represented by a trombone with a plunger mute, as in previous Peanuts media, courtesy of New Orleans jazz musician Trombone Shorty. Because of the robust number of existing Peanuts characters, the film does not introduce any new characters.

On January 8, 2013, Leigh Anne Brodsky became the managing director of Peanuts Worldwide and was set to control all the global deals for the film. In April 2013, Fox announced that the film would be released in 3D. In October 2013, it was announced that Paul Feig would also produce. By April 2015, 75% of the animation was complete, with some footage scheduled to debut at CinemaCon in Las Vegas.

=== Animation ===
Martino and his animators spent over a year looking at Charles M. Schulz's original drawing style to help translate the "hand-drawn warmth... into the cool pixel-precision of CGI" without the fear of something getting lost in translation, such as "how the dot of an eye [conveyed] joy or sorrow so efficiently". While the animators tried to translate the 2D characters into the visual aesthetics of CGI animation, the characters are animated on 2s, more akin to a stop-motion film than the usual traditions of computer animation, believing that its low framerate stylization was more compatible for "the technical needs to fit the style of Charles Schulz."

=== Music and soundtrack ===
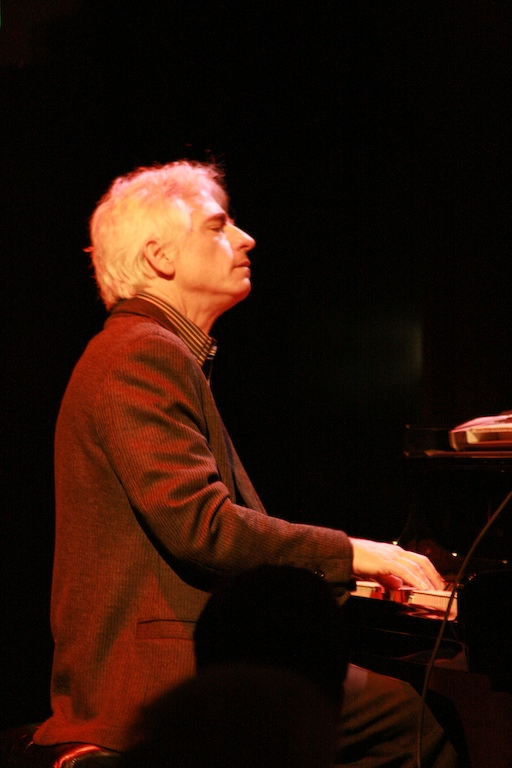
David Benoit, the jazz musician who is best known for his own rendition of Vince Guaraldi's "Linus and Lucy", contributed to the score by Christophe Beck.

In October 2014, it was announced that Christophe Beck would score the film. Beck stated, "With the Peanuts movies, I grew up on those specials from the '60s and '70s, that, of course, rerun to this day. I'm very fond of all that Vince Guaraldi music, so what we did was try to find spots in the film where we could sort of touch down and remind people who were watching the film that it's still a Peanuts movie, and there's still a place for that music in the film. There's a bunch of spots where we quote the Guaraldi music, or we actually re-record his pieces quite faithfully." He also added that the score would be more orchestral than Guaraldi's previous scores, which were mainly a small jazz combo. Jazz pianist David Benoit contributed to Beck's score.

On July 28, 2015, it was announced that Meghan Trainor would write and perform a song for the film, entitled "Better When I'm Dancin'". Epic Records released the soundtrack album on October 23, 2015. The 20-track album features Trainor's "Better When I'm Dancin", Flo Rida's "That's What I Like" featuring Fitz, "Linus and Lucy", "Skating" and "Christmas Time Is Here" by Vince Guaraldi, from the A Charlie Brown Christmas album, and 15 tracks of Beck's original score for the film. An exclusive edition of the soundtrack released at Target features a second Trainor track, "Good to Be Alive". The Japanese edition of the soundtrack includes "Good to Be Alive" and three more tracks from Beck's score. The Japanese release of the film also uses Japanese singer-songwriter Ayaka's "A Song For You" for the trailer and the ending instead of Trainor's, but it was released as a single and did not appear on the Japanese edition of the soundtrack album.

== Release ==
=== Premiere and theatrical release ===
The Peanuts Movie held its premiere in New York City on November 1, 2015, and was released on November 6, 2015, in the United States on 3,897 screens. The release commemorates the 65th anniversary of the comic strip and the 50th anniversary of the TV special A Charlie Brown Christmas. The film was originally scheduled for November 25, 2015, but in November 2012, it was rescheduled to November 6, 2015. The film was released as Snoopy and Charlie Brown: The Peanuts Movie in the United Kingdom on December 21, 2015. The Australian release date was originally set for December 21, 2015 but was postponed to January 8, 2016.

=== Video game ===
A video game based on the film, titled Snoopy's Grand Adventure, was released on November 3, 2015, for Xbox 360, Nintendo 3DS, Wii U, Xbox One, and PlayStation 4, and published by Activision.

=== Home media ===
The Peanuts Movie was released on digital platforms on February 12, 2016, before being released on DVD, Blu-ray, Blu-ray 3D, and 4K Ultra HD a month later on March 8, 2016. The film debuted at the top of the home media sales chart for the week ending on March 13, 2016.

=== Streaming ===
The Peanuts Movie was released on Disney+ on August 7, 2020, following The Walt Disney Company's acquisition of 21st Century Fox in 2019. It was removed on February 1, 2022, due to licensing contracts with HBO Max, but was re-added on October 7. The film switches back and forth between platforms every so often.

== Reception ==
=== Box office ===
The Peanuts Movie grossed $130.2 million in the United States and Canada, and $119.9 million in other territories, for a worldwide total of $250.1 million.

The film grossed $12.1 million on its opening day, earning a total of $44 million for the weekend (with 27% of the gross coming from 3D screenings), finishing second at the box office behind Spectre ($70.4 million). Outside North America, the film opened in the same week as the U.S. and grossed $4.56 million from 12 markets. China ($2.76 million) and Italy ($1.16 million) delivered the biggest openings. After three weekends, it opened to a total of 49 markets where it had the second biggest opening of 2015 in Mexico ($3.1 million) and debuted in the U.K., Ireland and Malta at No. 2 with $5.5 million (including previews) behind Star Wars: The Force Awakens. One of the final markets was Australia where the film opened on New Year's Day 2016, earning $2.6 million in its first week.

=== Critical response ===
The review aggregation website Rotten Tomatoes reported an 87% approval rating and an average rating of 7.1/10 based on 195 reviews, making it the highest-rated film produced by Blue Sky Studios. The site's consensus states: "The Peanuts Movie offers a colorful gateway into the world of its classic characters and a sweetly nostalgic – if relatively unambitious – treat for the adults who grew up with them." On Metacritic, the film has a weighted average score of 67 out of 100 based on 31 critics, indicating "generally favorable reviews". On CinemaScore, audiences gave the film an average grade of "A" on an A+ to F scale.

The Hollywood Reporter's Michael Rechtshaffen found the film to be especially praiseworthy, feeling that Charles Schulz would have been proud of the film, though he criticized the use of Trainor's song. Peter Debruge of Variety gave similar sentiments, especially praising the animation of the film. Alonso Duralde of TheWrap felt the film made a nice transition to 3D, saying, while the film might not reach "the melancholy of earlier films... it nonetheless respects the importance of failure and disappointment that Schulz always included in his storytelling". He did, however, feel that Peanuts purists would take issue with a few things in the film, such as seeing and hearing so much of the Little Red-Haired Girl, who was always off-panel in the comic strips, and Peppermint Patty acknowledging that Snoopy is a dog and not a child with a big nose. Pete Hammond from Deadline Hollywood admitted his trepidation about translating the characters from 2D to 3D, but enjoyed the film overall, only criticizing the amount of fantasy sequences involving Snoopy. Brian Truitt of USA Today gave the film three out of four stars, proclaiming the film "is all about simplicity, and what the plot lacks in nuance and complexity is made up for with relatable characters whom people have spent a lifetime watching. The movie is a testament to Charlie Brown's place in pop culture and a showcase for a new generation bound to fall in love with its perennially insecure star". Neil Genzlinger from The New York Times named the film an NYT Critics' Pick, calling it "the most charming and the most daring experiment in human genetics ever conducted". However, he also showed concern for the modern children's audiences who may or may not only know the Peanuts gang from the holiday specials.

Scott Mendelson from Forbes was more critical of the film, saying there was "nothing objectively wrong with The Peanuts Movie", but as he personally was not a fan of the Peanuts comic strip, that made him "anti-Charlie Brown", loathing each time Charlie Brown failed in the film. Joe McGovern from Entertainment Weekly was also not as receptive, giving the film a grade of C+, and criticizing the animation, stating, "Even if you assume that Schulz always wanted his frozen pond reflecting lustrous light and Snoopy frolicking in a lavish Hayao Miyazaki world, the animation steroids injected into the aesthetic here nonetheless shrivel the great melancholy that's so key to the comic's endurance". Vadim Rizov of Filmmaker Magazine criticized the film's unfaithfulness to the comic, saying "The Peanuts Movie celebrates well-known character quirks, but it completely trashes the spirit of the strip. An unavoidable necessity? I'm forced to conclude this is perhaps the case, but it's still infuriating."

While Christy Lemire of Rogerebert.com praised the film's "immersive authenticity" and "warm-hearted humor", she found the narrative to be a simple "series of vignettes" that settles into a lull. Nancy Churnin of The Dallas Morning News gave the film a positive review, calling it a "terrific" translation of the source material that successfully interweaves Charlie Brown's moral quest with Snoopy's aerial fantasy sequences. The Associated Process, writing for The Denver Post, also gave the film a positive review, lauding it for its "sophisticated animation" and a "wholesome appeal" and noting its success in balancing a "real world" story of childhood hurdles with Snoopy's "high-flying adventure." Nick Schager of IndieWire gave the film a "B" rating, describing it as a "respectful and intermittently funny" tribute that successfully bridges the gap between old and new, though he noted that the narrative is primarily a "series of brief comedic vignettes" that interweaves Charlie Brown's path to confidence with Snoopy's "fanciful quest" against the Red Baron. Matt Greene and Cole Schneider of the Panama City News Herald gave the film contrasting reviews; Greene called it a "truly funny all-ages romp," while Schneider argued that while the plot "remains a slice-of-life," the film's tone was "too happy" compared to the original comic. Sandie Angulo Chen of The Washington Post gave the film a positive review, calling it a "sweet little gift" that masterfully captures the spirit of the original characters while balancing grounded themes of youthful angst with Snoopy's imaginary "Flying Ace" flight scenes.

=== Accolades, awards and nominations ===
Award	Date of ceremony	Category	Recipient	Result	Ref(s)
African-American Film Critics Association	December 7, 2015	Best Animated Film	Steve Martino	Won	
Annie Awards	February 6, 2016	Best Animated Feature	Craig Schulz, Bryan Schulz, Cornelius Uliano, Paul Feig and Michael J. Travers	Nominated	
Annie Awards	February 6, 2016	Outstanding Achievement in Character Animation in a Feature Production	BJ Crawford	Nominated	
Annie Awards	February 6, 2016	Outstanding Achievement in Directing in an Animated Feature Production	Steve Martino	Nominated	
Annie Awards	February 6, 2016	Outstanding Achievement in Voice Acting in an Animated Feature Production	Alex Garfin	Nominated	
Annie Awards	February 6, 2016	Outstanding Achievement in Voice Acting in an Animated Feature Production	Hadley Belle Miller	Nominated	
Austin Film Critics Association Awards	December 29, 2015	Best Animated Film	The Peanuts Movie	Nominated	
Black Reel Awards	February 18, 2016	Outstanding Voice Performance	Marleik "Mar Mar" Walker	Nominated	
Critics' Choice Awards	January 17, 2016	Best Animated Feature	Steve Martino	Nominated	
Chicago Film Critics Association Awards	December 16, 2015	Best Animated Film	The Peanuts Movie	Nominated	
Golden Globe Awards	January 10, 2016	Best Animated Feature Film	Steve Martino	Nominated	
2015 Golden Tomato Awards	12 January 2016	Best Animated Movie	The Peanuts Movie	4th Place	
Houston Film Critics Society Awards	January 9, 2016	Best Animated Feature	The Peanuts Movie	Nominated	
Hollywood Music in Media Awards	November 12, 2015	Original Score - Animated Film	Christophe Beck	Won	
Hollywood Music in Media Awards	November 12, 2015	Original Song - Animated Film	Better When I'm Dancin'	Nominated	
Online Film Critics Society Awards	December 14, 2015	Best Animated Film	Steve Martino, Craig Schulz, Bryan Schulz, Cornelius Uliano, Paul Feig and Michael J. Travers	Nominated	
Golden Reel Awards	February 27, 2016	Best Sound Editing: Sound Effects, Foley, Dialogue & ADR in an Animation Feature Film	Gwendolyn Yates Whittle, MPSE, Randy Thom	Nominated	
Movieguide Awards	February 2016	Best Movie for Families	The Peanuts Movie	Nominated	
Nickelodeon Kid's Choice Awards	March 12, 2016	Favorite Animated Movie	The Peanuts Movie	Nominated	
Producers Guild of America Awards	January 23, 2016	Best Animated Motion Picture	Craig Schulz and Michael J. Travers	Nominated	
San Diego Film Critics Society Awards	December 14, 2015	Best Animated Film	The Peanuts Movie	Nominated	
San Francisco Film Critics Circle Awards	December 12, 2015	Best Animated Feature	The Peanuts Movie	Nominated	
Satellite Awards	February 21, 2016	Best Motion Picture, Animated or Mixed Media	The Peanuts Movie	Nominated	
Saturn Awards	June 22, 2016	Best Comic-to-Film Motion Picture	The Peanuts Movie	Nominated	
St. Louis Gateway Film Critics Association Awards	December 20, 2015	Best Animated Film	Steve Martino	Nominated	
Village Voice Film Poll	January 7, 2016	Best Animated Film	The Peanuts Movie	11th Place	
Village Voice Film Poll	January 7, 2016	Best Film	The Peanuts Movie	Nominated	
Visual Effects Society Awards	February 2, 2016	Outstanding Visual Effects in an Animated Feature	Steve Martino, Michael J. Travers, Nick Bruno, Scott Carroll	Nominated	
Washington D.C. Area Film Critics Association	December 7, 2015	Best Animated Feature	Steve Martino	Nominated	

== Future ==
Although The Peanuts Movie was considered a success, and Fox was reportedly interested in making a sequel and turning The Peanuts Movie into a franchise, the company was only granted the rights to one Peanuts film. Schulz's widow, Jean, indicated in November 2015 that a sequel was not imminent, stating, "This one took eight years, so maybe we'll talk again then." Blue Sky Studios shut down in 2021, meaning they would not produce a sequel.

In August 2023, Craig, Schulz's son and co-producer of the film, stated that another theatrical film was not "off the table". In November 2023, it was announced that a new Peanuts film was officially in development. The plot would revolve around Charlie Brown and his friends on an adventure to the Big City. While not a sequel to The Peanuts Movie, Steve Martino returned to direct, with a script by Karey Kirkpatrick from an original story by Craig Schulz, Bryan Schulz and Cornelius Uliano; while Bonnie Arnold was set to serve as producer. The film, titled Snoopy Unleashed, will be a joint-venture production between WildBrain Studios and Peanuts Worldwide and will be released exclusively on Apple TV.

== See also ==
- Peanuts filmography
