= Terry McGurrin =

Canadian comedian and actor

- Born: Ottawa, Ontario, Canada
- Occupations: Voice actor, comedian, writer, producer
- Years active: 1988–present
- Spouse: Elizabeth Whitmere (m. 2005)

Terry McGurrin is a Canadian comedian, writer, producer, and voice actor from Ottawa, Ontario. He was the story editor for the 2011 YTV show Scaredy Squirrel, in addition to voicing the title character. He is known as the voice of Jonesy Garcia on 6teen. He has also been a story editor and executive producer for the Total Drama series, such as Total Drama World Tour, Total Drama: All-Stars, Total Drama: Pahkitew Island, Total Drama Island (2023) (where he also voices the host, Chris McLean), and its spinoffs The Ridonculous Race (in which he also voices the role of the host, Don) and Total DramaRama. He also wrote episodes of The ZhuZhus, and voiced Drew and Travis in Norman Picklestripes.

McGurrin has also toured extensively as a stand-up comedian and has entertained the Canadian Forces stationed overseas 12 times to date. He participated in the Canadian Improv Games. He has taped three comedy specials that were featured on CTV, has received eight Gemini and Canadian Screen Award nominations, five nominations at the Canadian Comedy Awards, and one nomination at the WGC Screenwriting Awards. In 2014, he won an ACTRA Award for his voice work as Scaredy Squirrel. McGurrin is also the current voice actor of Snoopy starting from 2019's Snoopy in Space.

== Life and career ==
McGurrin was born and raised in Ottawa, Ontario to Helen (née Kelly) and Brian McGurrin. He started his acting career in 1988 in an episode of CBS Summer Playhouse. McGurrin was the voice of Squidguts and Coach Mountain for the first two seasons of the English dub of Medabots, as well as various voices. In 6teen, McGurrin voiced Jonesy Garcia in the series from 2004 to 2010. Earlier, in 2006, he voiced Yubby and Max in Pandalian and Kianu Kole in Stoked.

He later voiced Bolts and the Black Knight in Bolts & Blip, Scaredy Squirrel in the television series of the same name, Dilweed in Numb Chucks, and Don in Total Drama Presents: The Ridonculous Race, in which he also served as the co-developer and the series' producer. In Dot., he voiced Dad. He also voiced Lex Hatcher in the Abby Hatcher series. He also voiced Drew and Travis in Norman Picklestripes and Glen in one episode of Cyberchase. Starting from 2019's Snoopy in Space, McGurrin has been the current voice actor for Snoopy from the Peanuts comic strips created by Charles M. Schulz. McGurrin also reprised his role as Snoopy in The Snoopy Show and the TV specials For Auld Lang Syne, It's the Small Things, Charlie Brown, To Mom (and Dad), With Love, Lucy's School, and more.

As of 2005, McGurrin has been married to Elizabeth Whitmere. He had also done radio commercials for Vonage phone service.

== Filmography ==
=== Television ===
Year	Title	Role	Notes
1996–98	Stickin' Around	Additional Voices	
2001–02	Gutterball Alley	Sketch performer	
2001–03	Medabots	Squidguts, Coach Mountain (seasons 1–2), various voices	Dubbed English ver.
2004–10	6teen	Jonesy Garcia	
2006	Pandalian	Yubby, Max	
2009	Stoked	Kianu Kole	
2010–11	Bolts & Blip	Bolts/Black Knight	
2011–13	Scaredy Squirrel	Scaredy, Philmore	
2012–14	Detentionaire	Stinky/Lou Black	
2014–16	Numb Chucks	Dilweed	
2015	Total Drama Presents: The Ridonculous Race	Don	Also co-developer, producer
2016–18	Dot.	Dad	
2019–22	Abby Hatcher	Lex Hatcher	
2019–21	Snoopy in Space	Snoopy	
2019–21	Norman Picklestripes	Drew and Travis	
2020, 2024	Cyberchase	Glen	2 episodes
2021–23	The Snoopy Show	Snoopy	
2021	Who Are You, Charlie Brown	Snoopy	
2021	Snoopy Presents: For Auld Lang Syne	Snoopy	
2022	Snoopy Presents: It's the Small Things, Charlie Brown	Snoopy	
2022	Snoopy Presents: To Mom (and Dad), With Love	Snoopy	
2022	Snoopy Presents: Lucy's School	Snoopy	
2023	Snoopy Presents: One-of-a-Kind Marcie	Snoopy	
2023– present	Total Drama Island	Chris McLean	Also writer and producer
2024	Snoopy Presents: Welcome Home, Franklin	Snoopy	
2024–present	Camp Snoopy	Snoopy	
2025	Snoopy Presents: A Summer Musical	Snoopy	
2026	Snoopy Presents: There's No Place Like Home, Snoopy	Snoopy	

=== Video games ===
Year	Title	Role	Notes
2001	Heavy Metal: Geomatrix	Lance	
