= Hattie Kragten =

Canadian actress (born 2007)

- Born: October 1, 2007 (age 19); Canada
- Occupation: Actress
- Years active: 2014–present
- Relatives: Isaac Kragten (brother)

Hattie Kragten (born October 1, 2007) is a Canadian actress. She is known for her roles in Snoopy in Space, Abby Hatcher, and as Constance in The Testaments. She portrayed Olive on The Next Step in 2024.

== Filmography ==
=== Films ===
Year	Title	Role	Notes
2017	Christmas Wedding Planner	Barista	
2018	Backstabbing for Beginners	Kate	
2020	The Santa Squad	Rose Church	
2021	Daddy's Perfect Little Girl	Ella Chambers	
2021	Who Are You, Charlie Brown?	Sally Brown (voice)	Documentary

=== Television ===
Year	Title	Role	Notes
2016–2017	Incorporated	Hazel Hendricks	4 episodes; Recurring role
2017	Christmas in Angel Falls	Jenny Wilson	Television film
2017	Magical Christmas Ornaments	Skylar	Television film
2017	Murdoch Mysteries	Georgina Linney	Episode: "Home for the Holidays"
2018	Christmas at Grand Valley	Emma	Television film
2018–2021	Esme & Roy	Lucy Hoozlewoo	5 episodes; Recurring role
2019–2024	PJ Masks	Motsuki (voice)	Recurring role
2019	Odd Squad	New Professor O	Episode: "Odds and Ends"
2019	Frankie Drake Mysteries	Roya	Episode: "School Ties, School Lies"
2019	Xavier Riddle and the Secret Museum	Golda Meir (voice)	Episode: "I Am Golda Meir"
2019–2020	Abby Hatcher	Harriet Bouffant (voice)	Main role
2019–2020	Corn & Peg	Ruby McDougal	Recurring role
2019–2021	Snoopy in Space	Sally Brown (voice)	Main role
2020	Spinning Out	Young Kat	Episode: "Have a Nice Day!"
2020	Odd Squad	Van Computer (voice)	9 episodes; Recurring role
2020	The Solutioneers	Riley	Main role
2021–2023	The Snoopy Show	Sally Brown (voice)	Main role
2021–2023	Go, Dog. Go!	Little Dog (voice)	4 episodes
2021	Odd Squad	Olanda	Episode: "Substitute Agents"
2021	Snoopy Presents: For Auld Lang Syne	Sally Brown (voice)	TV special
2022	Snoopy Presents: It's the Small Things, Charlie Brown	Sally Brown (voice)	TV special
2022	Snoopy Presents: To Mom (and Dad), With Love	Sally Brown (voice)	TV special
2022	Snoopy Presents: Lucy's School	Sally Brown (voice)	TV special
2024	Snoopy Presents: Welcome Home, Franklin	Sally Brown (voice)	TV special
2024	The Next Step	Olive	Main role
2024	Camp Snoopy	Sally Brown (voice)	Main role (season 1)
2025	Snoopy Presents: A Summer Musical	Sally Brown (voice)	TV special
2026	The Testaments	Constance	Recurring Role
