= Franklin (Peanuts) =

Peanuts comic strip character

- Peanuts character
- First appearance: July 31, 1968
- Last appearance: November 5, 1999 (Peanuts comic strip)
- Voiced by: Various (see § Voice actors)

In-universe information
- Full name: Franklin Armstrong (in non-strip media)
- Gender: Male
- Nationality: American

Franklin is a fictional character in the comic strip Peanuts, created by Charles M. Schulz. Introduced on July 31, 1968, Franklin was the first black character in the strip. He is the second person of color to appear in the strip, debuting a year after José Peterson, a polite, biracial athlete of Mexican and Swedish ancestry who was introduced in 1967. Franklin goes to school with Peppermint Patty and Marcie.

In his first appearance, he met Charlie Brown when they were both at the beach. Franklin's father was a soldier fighting in the Vietnam War, to which Charlie Brown replied "My dad's a barber... he was in a war too, but I don't know which one." Franklin later paid Charlie Brown a visit and found some of Charlie Brown's other friends to be quite odd. His last appearance in the Peanuts comic strip was on November 5, 1999, three months before Schulz's death.

While his surname is never confirmed in the comic strip, some animated specials, beginning with You're in the Super Bowl, Charlie Brown, give his full name as Franklin Armstrong. Schulz chose the surname as a nod to African-American cartoonist Robb Armstrong, who would later contribute to Welcome Home, Franklin, a direct-to-Internet special based around the character.

== Publication ==
A Los Angeles schoolteacher named Harriet Glickman wrote to Schulz on April 15, 1968 (11 days after the assassination of Martin Luther King Jr.), urging him to introduce a black character into Peanuts. On April 26, Schulz wrote back, saying that he had thought about this, but was afraid of "patronizing our Negro friends." This began a correspondence between Schulz and Glickman that led to Schulz's creation of Franklin. In an interview in 1997, Schulz discussed receiving a letter from a Southern editor "who said something about, 'I don't mind you having a black character, but please don't show them in school together.' Because I had shown Franklin sitting in front of Peppermint Patty... I didn't even answer him."

Larry Rutman, president of Peanuts’ longtime distributor United Feature Syndicate, attempted to get Schulz to change the character. "Well, Larry, let's put it this way," Schulz recalled responding. "Either you print it just the way I draw it or I quit. How's that?" Franklin's skin color was mentioned in The Charlie Brown Dictionary, a picture dictionary using the Peanuts characters; he was referred to in the definition of "black" in showing a picture of him talking on the telephone, where the color of the telephone is black. The description also says that "black may also refer to Franklin's skin tone, which is also known as a Negro person."

== Personality ==
In his initial appearances, Franklin seemed confused by all the strange things in Charlie Brown's neighborhood, especially Linus and his obsession with the Great Pumpkin. Schulz said of Franklin's first appearance, July 31, 1968, when he met Charlie Brown at the beach, "They'd never met before because they went to different schools," adding, "but they had fun playing ball so Charlie Brown invited Franklin to visit him." Franklin quoted the Old Testament, and had no anxieties or obsessions. Franklin and Charlie Brown also enjoyed sharing stories about their grandfathers.

In the animated films and television specials, Franklin is shown to be a skilled dancer. He leads Marcie in a waltz in Race for Your Life, Charlie Brown, performs an elaborate break-dancing routine in It's Flashbeagle, Charlie Brown, and performs another break-dancing number (while also rapping) in It's Spring Training, Charlie Brown. Franklin also seems to possess some musical ability as he is shown playing instruments from time to time. In the holiday special Happy New Year, Charlie Brown!, he is shown playing the guitar at Peppermint Patty's New Year's party.

== In other media ==
As a permanent character of the comic strip, Franklin is also a frequent character in the animated Peanuts television specials and movies. Unlike most characters, however, he did not appear in animation until the 1970s with his debut being a silent role in the 1972 movie Snoopy Come Home at Snoopy's farewell party. His first speaking role is in the 1973 special There's No Time for Love, Charlie Brown, in which he is voiced by Todd Barbee.

In a Weekend Update commentary on a 1992 episode of Saturday Night Live, Chris Rock, who hyperbolically stated that Franklin had not said a single word for 25 years, related his own childhood experience as the only black student in his grade school class. In another Saturday Night Live cold opening in February 2000, the Saturday after Schulz's death, Tim Meadows portrayed a grown-up Franklin (with facial appliances to make his head look as round as the comic strip), eulogizing Schulz on Nightline, saying, "Charles Schulz understood regardless of race, we're all the same; we have heads as large as our bodies, and our mouths disappear when we turn sideways."

In the 1994 animated television special You're in the Super Bowl, Charlie Brown, Franklin's full name is given as Franklin Armstrong. According to Robb Armstrong, the African-American creator of the comic strip Jump Start, Schulz called him during the special's production and asked if he could make "Armstrong" Franklin's last name, and Robb Armstrong, considering it a "tremendous honor", gave his permission. Since this surname is never mentioned in the comic strip (nor in any other special for three decades), it is generally considered to be outside of Peanuts canon.

Franklin reappeared as a supporting character in 2015's The Peanuts Movie.

In November 2020, BBC Radio 4 broadcast Franklin, a radio play based around Schulz's creation of Franklin.

In February 2024, Snoopy Presents: Welcome Home, Franklin, a special revolving around Franklin's introduction to Charlie Brown and his friends, was released. Robb Armstrong continued his contributions to Franklin's legacy by co-writing the special, which again gives his surname as Armstrong.

== Voice actors ==
- Todd Barbee (1973)
- Robin Reed (1973)
- Duncan Watson (1975)
- Vinnie Dow (1976)
- Tom Muller (1977)
- Ronald Hendrix (1977)
- Rocky Reilly (1981)
- Christopher Donohone (1981–1982)
- Kevin Brando (1983)
- Carl Steven (1985)
- Hakeem Abdul-Samad (1989)
- Grant Gelt (1988)
- Sean Mendelson (1992)
- Charlie Payne (1994)
- Jessica Nwafor (1996)
- Corey Padnos (2000)
- Stephen Scarpulo (2001)
- Andreas Glantschnig (2001)
- Jake Miner (2003)
- Marleik "Mar Mar" Walker (2015)
- Caleel Harris (2016)
- Antonio Watson (2018)
- Christian Dal Dosso (2019–2022)
- Caleb Bellavance (2022–2025)
- Kitai O'Garro (2026–present)
