= Frieda (Peanuts) =

Peanuts comic strip character

- Peanuts character
- First appearance: March 6, 1961
- Last appearance: November 22, 1985 (comic strip)
- Voiced by: Ann Altieri (1963–1969); Lynda Mendelson (1969–1972); Linda Ercoli (1975); Michelle Muller (1976); Roseline Rubens (1980); Mary Tunnell (1983); Kaitlyn Maggio (2003); Jolean Wejbe (2006); Allison Cohen (2008-2009); Francesca Capaldi (2015); Cassidy May Benullo (2016); Maya Misaljevic (2021-present)

In-universe information
- Full name: Frieda Rich (in non-strip media)
- Gender: Female
- Family: Unnamed parents Faron (cat)
- Nationality: American

Frieda /ˈfriːdə/ is a fictional character in the comic strip Peanuts by Charles Schulz. She is known for having naturally curly red hair, of which she is extremely proud.

According to Schulz, Frieda's character was inspired by his longtime friend Frieda Rich, a local artist whom he met while taking classes at the Art Instruction Schools in Minneapolis, Minnesota. She was a regular in Peanuts throughout the 1960s, but as newer characters were phased in towards the end of the decade, she began appearing less often, and she ceased to be a featured character after 1985, making only cameo appearances since then in various television specials. Her full name was revealed in the 2015 film The Peanuts Movie as Frieda Rich.

== Character outline ==
=== Appearance ===
Frieda has red "naturally" curly hair, of which she is quite proud. She was the only girl on Charlie Brown's baseball team to not wear a cap because it would cover up her "naturally" curly hair. She often wears dresses, usually lavender in the TV specials and movies, but colored dark pink in The Peanuts Movie and green in "Peanuts," the TV series. She also wears saddle shoes.

=== Personality and characteristics ===
Frieda made her debut on March 6, 1961, when Linus introduced her to Charlie Brown. She was the eleventh permanent character to join the cast, and the first since Sally was born in 1959. She was initially presented, in both the advance press release and the first few strips, as Linus's schoolmate. She sat behind him in class, and although he considered her a friend, he also confessed that because she was such a chatterbox, he hadn't heard a word their teacher said the whole semester. Her most prominent feature is her "naturally" curly red hair, which she manages to work into every conversation, to the dismay of those around her. This love of her own hair leads people to believe that she is rather vain. In turn, Frieda herself believes that the other girls are jealous of her hair (and often becomes disappointed or depressed when the other girls tell her that they're not jealous of her hair), and also that "people expect more of her" because she has it. Nevertheless, enough people in the neighborhood like her that she got thirty valentines one year. Journalist Christopher Caldwell described her as, "A fetching, kind and charming girl, who throws her deeper goodness away because she wants to be admired for such superficialities as 'being a good conversationalist." She admitted that she used to be an avid reader until she started getting too busy.

Frieda Rich, the character's namesake, was once asked whether she bore any character resemblances to her cartoon counterpart. She replied "I recognize myself," adding as an example that while talking to Schulz once about Universalists and Congregationalists, she had jokingly called herself a "conversationalist," and Schulz borrowed that for the strip.

== Relationships with other characters ==
=== Charlie Brown ===
Frieda was usually nicer to Charlie Brown than most of the other girls in the neighborhood. Unlike Lucy, Patty, and Violet, she seemed to be mindful of his feelings and never teased him or put him down to his face (except for rare moments in the Peanuts specials), though she did get mad at him a few times. She eventually joined Charlie Brown's baseball team as an outfielder, but refused to wear a baseball cap because it would hide her curly hair. She seemed to be one of the few characters that Charlie Brown felt confident enough to stand up to, as he did once when she was badgering Snoopy about chasing rabbits and he told her to mind her own business.

=== Linus van Pelt ===
Linus was the first character in the series that Frieda met. She sat behind him in school, and after they became friends, he introduced her to some of the other kids in the neighborhood. Not much is shown of their friendship beyond those strips that introduce her, but this early in their relationship, they seemed to look out for each other. Linus tried to protect her the first time she unintentionally upset Lucy (see below), and she in turn was one of the few kids who didn't see his need for a security blanket as a bad thing, for which he was so grateful that he kissed her hand.

=== Lucy van Pelt ===
Frieda's relationship with Lucy got off to a rocky start when Frieda, as usual, brought up her naturally curly hair almost as soon as they were introduced. Lucy became visibly offended by this, to the point where Linus (performing the introductions) felt it necessary to beg Lucy not to slug her. Despite Frieda's faux pas the two girls eventually became friends, and when they played baseball for Charlie Brown's team they often spent their time in the outfield chatting instead of paying attention to the game. Frieda is sometimes seen with Lucy's mean girl clique with Patty and Violet, though the only times when she ever participates in meanness is in the TV specials.

=== Schroeder ===
Frieda has made Lucy jealous by leaning on Schroeder's piano. Schroeder seemed to dislike her as much as he disliked Lucy when she didn't know who Beethoven was (and after Frieda claimed that she was hanging around Schroeder because she was a music lover). In one strip and episode of The Charlie Brown and Snoopy Show, Frieda commented to Lucy that Schroeder wasn't very friendly. When Frieda attempted to kiss Schroeder while he was playing his piano, she was surprised when she found she had kissed Snoopy instead, and she ran away disgusted. On another occasion, a jealous Lucy (with encouragement from Snoopy) actually got into a physical altercation with Frieda when the former discovered her leaning on Schroeder's piano, Lucy's usual domain. Lucy ends up winning the fight, as can be seen in the last panel where a battered, injured Lucy triumphantly shakes hands with Snoopy. Schroeder does not have feelings for Frieda. He never gave her any Valentines in any of the official comic strips despite incorrect info circulating online.

=== Snoopy ===
Out of all the characters, Frieda has the most trouble getting along with Snoopy, whom she frequently accuses of being "lazy" and "useless." She has strong pre-conceived notions of what a beagle should be doing with its time; she wants Snoopy to be a working dog and a hunter (especially a hunter of rabbits), and not spend so much time sleeping on top of his doghouse. She often comes over and tries to goad Snoopy into chasing rabbits with her, either by threat or persuasion, which he is always reluctant to do. If he does consent to "hunt," he'll either sandbag it and only pretend to look for the rabbits, or if he does find rabbits he'll frolic and play with them once he's out of Frieda's sight. Once, in a fit of frustration, she reported Snoopy's behavior to the "Head Beagle," which led to him being found guilty of not meeting his rabbit quota and left the neighborhood kids mad at her for turning him in. In the movie Snoopy Come Home, she said at Snoopy's farewell party: "I'm sorry to see you go, Snoopy. I'm sorry we never caught any rabbits."

=== Faron ===
Faron is a male cat that Frieda's mother bought for her. Frieda believed Snoopy was too smug for his own good, and decided that having a cat in the neighborhood would take him down a few notches. Her choice of cat ended up being more comical than intimidating; Faron is seemingly boneless, and she carries him everywhere, draped over her arms. He seemed to be as unpopular with the other neighborhood kids as he was with Snoopy; Frieda tried to find someone to hold Faron for her whenever she needed to go somewhere like the library that wouldn't allow cats inside, but she usually had a lot of trouble finding a willing volunteer. A running gag included Charlie Brown, Linus, and even Snoopy getting trapped into holding Faron while Frieda ran her errands.

Faron was named for country music singer Faron Young, whom Schulz "admired very much," but he only made a few appearances in the strip. Schulz was not satisfied with his own drawing of a cat; also, he wanted to continue exploring Snoopy's fantasy life, and felt like having a cat in the strip brought Snoopy back to being too much of a real dog. Schulz didn't even draw Faron for his last appearance, in which the cat got stuck in a tree.

Faron once spoke English to Snoopy in a thought balloon, making him one of the few non-human or non-dog animals to do so.

== Last appearance ==
Although Frieda was a regular character in the 1960s, her appearances gradually began dwindling. According to Charles Schulz, "I realized that Frieda added relatively little to the strip and had few character traits beyond bragging about her hair and her obsession with getting Snoopy to chase rabbits." After her last major storyline in October 1969 (after reporting Snoopy to the Head Beagle), she only featured in 10 further strips between 1970 and 1985, often with over a year between appearances. Her penultimate appearance was in 1978, after which she disappeared for seven years before her final appearance on November 22, 1985.

Frieda also continued to make appearances in the animated Peanuts specials and the Saturday morning series The Charlie Brown and Snoopy Show, even being mentioned in the lyrics of the latter's theme song. She is also featured as an unseen character in the musical You're a Good Man, Charlie Brown, being mentioned several times, and yelled to at one point after Lucy heard one of Charlie Brown's secrets. Also in this show, her characteristic fondness for hunting rabbits is assumed by Sally. Frieda appeared in 150 strips and appeared for the last time on November 22, 1985. Frieda appears in The Peanuts Movie (2015) directed by Steve Martino. She is voiced by Francesca Capaldi who also voices The Little Red-Haired Girl in the movie. Frieda also makes multiple appearances in the Peanuts TV series.

== Voiced by ==
- Ann Altieri (1963, 1965–1966)
- Lynda Mendelson (1969, 1971–1972)
- Linda Ercoli (1975)
- Michelle Muller (1976)
- Roseline Rubens (1977, 1980)
- Stacy Heather Tolkin (1983)
- Mary Tunnell (1983)
- Stacy Ferguson (1985)
- Brittany M. Thornton (1992)
- Seren Piper (1994)
- Kaitlyn Maggio (2003)
- Jolean Wejbe (2006)
- Allison Cohen (2008–2009)
- Francesca Angelucci Capaldi (2015)
- Cassidy May Benullo (2016)
- Maya Misaljevic (2021–present)
