= Patty (Peanuts) =

Peanuts comic strip character

- Patty in a red dress.
- First appearance: October 2, 1950
- Last appearance: April 17, 1995 (comic strip; original); November 27, 1997 (comic strip; reprint)
- Voiced by: Karen Mendelson (1963, 1965); Lisa DeFaria (1966-1969); Lynn Vanderlip (1966); Sally Dryer (1969); Linda Ercoli (1972-1975); Lynn Mortensen (1974); Linda Jenner (1974); Michelle Stacy (1975-1977); Roseline Rubens (1980); Angela Lee (1983); Stacy Ferguson (1984-1986); Deanna Tello (1992); Kaitlyn Maggio (2003); Jolean Wejbe (2006); Leigh Bourke (2008-2009); Ciara Bravo (2011); Anastasia Bredikhina (2015); Natasha Nathan (2021-present)

In-universe information
- Gender: Female
- Nationality: American

Patty is a fictional character featured in the long-running syndicated daily and Sunday comic strip Peanuts, created by Charles M. Schulz. Patty was formerly a major character whose role was reduced in later years; she never developed a distinct personality like Lucy or Sally. She is sometimes confused with Peppermint Patty, a different and later character with a similar name. Patty appeared in the first Peanuts strip, with Shermy and Charlie Brown, on October 2, 1950.

Patty is best known as a girl who thinks highly of herself; because of her self-opinion, she often torments the hapless Charlie Brown. She usually accompanies her best friend Violet and sometimes the abrasive Lucy.

Patty has appeared in numerous Peanuts television specials, cinematic films, theatrical plays, and video games.

In the 2015 film The Peanuts Movie, her full name is given as Patty Swanson. This name never appeared in the comic strip or in any official Peanuts media during Schulz's lifetime; thus, the name is not canon. (Patty Swanson was in fact the name of the real person who partially inspired Peppermint Patty and had also served as the inspiration for the earlier Patty's name.)

== History ==
An early conception of the character was created by Schulz for his comic strip Li'l Folks (a precursor to Peanuts). Schulz then reused the character for Peanuts, and there he named her Patty.

Patty was featured in the first Peanuts comic strip, on October 2, 1950. In subsequent strips, Patty's character developed and she appeared regularly, but she eventually became less and less prominent until her succeeding appearances were reduced to mere cameos. By 1966, Schulz recycled the Patty name for a new character: Patricia "Peppermint Patty" Reichardt. Although the original Patty would make cameo appearances throughout the run of Peanuts, she had ceased being a featured character by about 1975.

She continued to make cameo or background appearances until the early 1990s. Her last appearance was a rerun of a 1992 strip which was republished on November 27, 1997. Schulz claimed he drew Patty in the March 2, 1994, strip in which she wants Snoopy to chase rabbits with her (a role previously usually taken by Frieda), although some fans have stated that the girl in the strip in question does not resemble Patty.

Both before and after she receded into the background, Patty usually appeared either with her best friend Violet or with the rest of Charlie Brown's baseball team.

=== Other media ===
Patty made her television debut in the 1965 classic A Charlie Brown Christmas. She appeared in many of the succeeding specials and theatrical animated films, the most recent of the specials being Happiness Is a Warm Blanket, Charlie Brown. Patty had a major part in the original version of the stage musical You're a Good Man, Charlie Brown. She also appeared in The Peanuts Movie, a computer-generated movie based on the strip.

== Character outline ==
As the only female character in the strip's very earliest days, Patty often acted as a sort of hen, looking out for the younger characters; however, she also set the tone for the strong female characters in the Peanuts universe. In her (and the strip's) second appearance, Patty is shown walking down the sidewalk reciting "Little girls are made of sugar and spice and everything nice." She then punches Charlie Brown in the face and, without missing a beat, continues "That's what little girls are made of!"

Patty's name was first mentioned on October 26, 1950, 24 days after her first appearance. She was apparently the oldest child in the strip (possibly along with Violet and Shermy), as she attended school when Charlie Brown did not (strip of September 18, 1951). Eventually, she, along with Violet, became best known for their social snobbery and combined cruelty to Charlie Brown, although Violet was generally the more dominant of the two (thus Patty's role, in her later appearances, was reduced to that of a yes-girl). Patty is also known for asking Pig-Pen why he is constantly so dirty. In the 2015 film The Peanuts Movie, Patty shows a crush towards Pig-Pen.

Patty's hair color is light brown (sometimes red, black, or blonde) and she customarily wears a checked dress with a matching bow in her hair, usually colored orange (colored light green in The Peanuts Movie), and Mary Janes shoes.

Patty's birthday is December 4. However, the strip from October 20, 1954, seemingly contradicts this; this strip states that her birthday is October 21. She plays outfield on Charlie Brown's baseball team; though in an early strip she was seen as catcher before Schroeder was introduced. It is Patty who first introduces Charlie Brown to Schroeder, who she said lived next door to her.

== Voiced by ==
- Karen Mendelson (1963, 1965)
- Lisa DeFaria (1966–1969)
- Lynn Vanderlip (1966)
- Sally Dryer (1969)
- Linda Ercoli (1972–1975)
- Lynn Mortensen (1974)
- Linda Jenner (1974)
- Roseline Rubens (1980)
- Angela Lee (1983)
- Stacy Ferguson (1984–1986)
- Deanna Tello (1992)
- Kaitlyn Maggio (2003)
- Jolean Wejbe (2006)
- Leigh Bourke (2008–2009)
- Ciara Bravo (2011)
- Anastasia Bredikhina (2015)
- Natasha Nathan (2021–present)

== Portrayals ==
Patty appeared as one of six characters in the original 1967 off-Broadway production of You're a Good Man, Charlie Brown (played by Karen Johnson). The character in the original musical was actually a composite of Patty, Frieda (who forces Snoopy to chase rabbits), and possibly Violet. By the time the show was revived on Broadway in the late 1990s, the composite Patty was replaced with Sally, since Patty had ceased making regular appearances in the strip decades earlier.
