= Peppermint Patty =

Peanuts comic strip character

- Peanuts character
- First appearance: August 22, 1966
- Created by: Charles M. Schulz
- Voiced by: Various (See below)

In-universe information
- Full name: Patricia “Patty” Reichardt
- Gender: Female
- Family: Unnamed father
- Nationality: American

Peppermint Patty is a fictional character featured in Charles M. Schulz's comic strip Peanuts. Her full name, very rarely used in the strip, is Patricia Reichardt. She is often confused with Patty, a character introduced earlier in the Peanuts Comics. She is one of a small group in the strip who live across town from Charlie Brown and his school friends (although in The Peanuts Movie, Snoopy in Space, and The Snoopy Show she, Marcie, and Franklin live in the same neighborhood and attend the same school). She has freckles and brown hair, and generally displays the characteristics of a tomboy. She made her first appearance on August 22, 1966. The following year she made her animated debut in the TV special You're in Love, Charlie Brown and began (in the comics) coaching a baseball team that played against Charlie Brown, and thereafter had other adventures with him. Uniquely, she refers to Charlie Brown and Lucy as "Chuck" and "Lucille", respectively. In most of her appearances, she is attracted to Charlie Brown, based on her reactions.

== History ==
Charles M. Schulz modeled Peppermint Patty after a favorite cousin, Patricia Swanson, who served as a regular inspiration for Peanuts. Schulz had also named his earlier character Patty after Swanson, and he coined his well-known phrase "Happiness Is a Warm Puppy" during a conversation with her in 1959. Swanson's roommate Elise Gallaway served as the model for Peppermint Patty's best friend Marcie. In later years, especially after lesbian groups began identifying with Peppermint Patty, Schulz downplayed the fact that the character was based on Swanson to protect her privacy.

In one interview, Schulz stated that he coined Peppermint Patty's name after noticing a dish of peppermint patties in his house and deciding the name was so good that he should use it before another artist thought of the same joke. He created the character design to fit the name. Peppermint Patty debuted in the strip of August 22, 1966. (Note: This has led to some confusion over whether Peppermint Patty is named for simple peppermint candies or the actual York Peppermint Patty. In 1966, the York patties had been in existence for a quarter-century but were only offered for sale in the eastern US, where the California-based Schulz was unlikely to come across one. They were not rolled out nationally until 1975.) In 1972, Schulz introduced the character's last name, Reichardt, which he borrowed from the last name of his secretary, Sue Reichardt, whose favorite character was Peppermint Patty.

Peppermint Patty was first voiced by Gabrielle DeFaria in the CBS television specials, then by various other child performers both male—such as Christopher DeFaria (1969-1973), Stuart Brotman (1975-1977) and Brent Hauer (1980-1983)—and female—including Donna Forman Le Tourneau (1974), Linda Ercoli (1974), Victoria Vargas (1983), Gini Holtzman (1984–1985) and Kristie Baker (1986-1988).

== Theme song ==
Jazz pianist Vince Guaraldi composed the eponymous theme song for Peppermint Patty in 1967, making its first appearance in the television special You're in Love, Charlie Brown. In his book Vince Guaraldi at the Piano, Guaraldi historian and biographer Derrick Bang wrote that the upbeat melody "aptly conveyed her character's feisty, tomboyish nature and just-under-the-radar feminism." Producer Lee Mendelson commented that Schulz was particularly fond of the theme Guaraldi wrote for the character.

Various renditions of Peppermint Patty's theme song appeared in nearly every television special Guaraldi scored that the character appeared in, including He's Your Dog, Charlie Brown (1968), It Was a Short Summer, Charlie Brown (1969), Play It Again, Charlie Brown (1971), There's No Time for Love, Charlie Brown, A Charlie Brown Thanksgiving (both 1973), It's the Easter Beagle, Charlie Brown (1974) and You're a Good Sport, Charlie Brown (1975). Unique variations of the song were commercially released on the albums Oh Good Grief! (1968) and The Charlie Brown Suite & Other Favorites (recorded 1969, released 2003). It also was covered by George Winston on Linus and Lucy: The Music of Vince Guaraldi (1996) and David Benoit on It's a David Benoit Christmas! (2020).

== Appearance ==
Peppermint Patty has chin-length hair that she describes as "mousy-blah", most often depicted as a medium brown (though the color has sometimes appeared as orange-red or auburn, as in The Peanuts Movie), and has freckles. She wears a green, striped collared shirt, black or dark blue shorts (long pants in The Peanuts Movie) with two vertical white stripes on each side, and she almost always wears sandals (brown in the comic strip and merchandise; green in animated appearances except in The Peanuts Movie) with her toes showing. In one series of strips where she is forbidden to wear the sandals in school, it is revealed they were a gift from her father because she was "a rare gem".

== Character traits ==
Peppermint Patty is noted for her somewhat dull and slow-minded temperament, resulting in embarrassments and inconveniences. For a long time, she was unaware that Snoopy was a dog, referring to him as "a funny-looking kid with a big nose". This was a recurrent gag in the strip until an incident (featured in a series of strips from March 1974) in which Peppermint Patty declares she is through with school and plans to spend the rest of her days staying in "Chuck's guest cottage" (Snoopy's dog house). By the end of this story arc, Marcie angrily informs Peppermint Patty that the "funny-looking kid" is actually a beagle, leaving Peppermint Patty in stunned shock for several strips. In a later phone call to Charlie Brown, Peppermint Patty finally accepts the truth: "Let's just say my pride had the flu, okay, Chuck?"

Peppermint Patty also thinks that a school for gifted children means that enrolling will result in her receiving gifts. She confuses a dog obedience school with a human private school, going so far as to enroll and graduate with the other dogs. Only later, when she tries to use that diploma to escape having to attend regular school, does she discover her mistake. Although initially angry with Snoopy, who had recommended the school to her, she forgives him after he rescues her from a fight with a cat named "World War II" (whom she mistook for Snoopy in a cat suit) that lives next door to Charlie Brown.

She is widely known for receiving a D− grade on every school assignment or exam (in 1999, the final full year of Peanuts, her teacher presents her with a certificate naming her to the "D-Minus Hall of Fame"). In one comic strip, Peppermint Patty gets a Z−, which she calls "sarcasm". In a series of strips in 1984, Peppermint Patty is held back a grade for failing all of her classes—only to be allowed to return to her old class when her old desk in front of Marcie starts to emit snoring noises, leading both students and faculty to suspect that a "snoring ghost" haunts the classroom.

Peppermint Patty's bad grades are possibly exacerbated by her tendency to sleep during class due to being too insecure to sleep until her father returns home from working late. In one series of strips, Marcie suggests that Patty's unrequited love for Charlie Brown (see below) causes her to fall asleep. At Marcie's urging, Patty also goes to a sleep disorder treatment center to be tested for narcolepsy; it is reaffirmed that staying up too late at night, and not narcolepsy, causes Patty to sleep in class.

Peppermint Patty hires Snoopy twice to serve as her watchdog so she can sleep better at night, but both attempts are unsuccessful. The first time, Snoopy is unable to abandon her waterbed in the guest room to catch the burglars who are stealing from the house, and the second time, a girl poodle distracts him and becomes his fiancée (the engagement is called off on the day of the wedding), leading Patty to angrily call Charlie Brown late at night and order him to come to her house to replace Snoopy as watchdog. Besides guard duties, Peppermint Patty also retains Snoopy's services in other ways, including as an attorney and as a figure skating coach.

Her full name, Patricia Reichardt, is first mentioned in the January 15, 1972, strip when she, with Snoopy acting as her attorney, openly challenges the school's new dress code that forbids shorts and sandals.

Peppermint Patty is the most "tomboyish" girl in the comic strip; she is a star athlete, especially in baseball where her team regularly trounces Charlie Brown's. In the first series of strips in which Peppermint Patty appeared in 1966, she actually joins "Chuck's" team as its new pitcher, relegating Charlie Brown to the outfield. However, she quits in disgust after only one game; despite tossing a no-hitter and slamming five home runs, her new team loses, 37–5, because of their somewhat porous defense. On another occasion, she lets Charlie Brown throw the last pitch of the game, having pitched a no-hit game leading 50–0, only to see him lose the game 51–50.

Peppermint Patty lives with and is particularly close to her father, even though he apparently has to travel a lot. He refers to her as his "rare gem", a nickname Patty loves. No siblings are ever mentioned. She has often lamented her lack of a mother to help her prepare for skating competitions and such:

Peppermint Patty: "Skating mothers are like stage mothers and swimming mothers. They grumble and complain and gossip and fuss, but you really need them!"
Marcie: "How do they get that way, sir?"
Peppermint Patty: "Early rising and too much coffee."

Peppermint Patty mentions her mother throughout the television special He's Your Dog, Charlie Brown, but Schulz repeatedly stated that the situations presented in the cartoon adaptations are not canonical to the strip.

Peppermint Patty's mother is the subject of the 2022 Apple TV+ special Snoopy Presents: To Mom (and Dad), With Love. Unhappy because everyone else has a mother to celebrate Mother's Day with, she decides to celebrate her father instead, because he raised her by himself.

== Relationships with other characters ==
Peppermint Patty's closest friend, Marcie, calls her "sir". This trait follows one of Marcie's prototype characters, a girl named Sophie for whom Patty was a summer camp counselor. For a long time, this was a major annoyance to Peppermint Patty, who would continually snap at Marcie, "Stop calling me Sir!" Eventually, she got used to it; Peppermint Patty's final use of the catchphrase occurred in 1988. Marcie also called her "Priscilla" in A Charlie Brown Thanksgiving; however, this is a continuation of a reference Linus had just made to Longfellow's poem The Courtship of Miles Standish in which Standish asks John Alden to speak to Priscilla Mullins on his behalf (just as Peppermint Patty has asked Marcie to speak to Charlie Brown).

Not until a few years after she was introduced into the strip did it become apparent that Peppermint Patty had a crush on Charlie Brown, although it is pursued and received with varying degrees of projection, enthusiasm, and obliviousness, especially on the part of Charlie Brown. Peppermint Patty frequently plays lovers' games with Charlie Brown, and gets frustrated or even angry when he does not take the bait; he does like Peppermint Patty, but only as a friend (though their friendship is occasionally strained by her strong personality and bossiness toward him). Originally, Peppermint Patty played reverse psychology; she would often say, "You kind of like me, don't you, Chuck?" when it was clear that it was Peppermint Patty who had the crush on Charlie Brown, while he not only did not have a crush on her, he also did not quite know what to make of her. His true love was the unattainable Little Red-Haired Girl, and having a girl actually like him was unexplored territory, although Peppermint Patty once angrily expressed her jealousy to Charlie Brown for his affection of that girl. Peppermint Patty frequently denied having a crush on Charlie Brown at first, writing him off as too wishy-washy and because she "could strike him out on three straight pitches", and during a game of Ha-Ha Herman crudely insulting him when she thought he was not listening. However, to her credit, she was shown to be visibly upset when Marcie pointed out that he had overheard her comments and apologized to him the very next day. Yet it was still obvious to Marcie that Peppermint Patty liked Charlie Brown as more than a friend, wishy-washy or not.

In one Sunday strip on July 22, 1979 (drawn as part of a storyline in which Charlie Brown was in the hospital), Peppermint Patty essentially admitted her feelings for Charlie Brown and, in the same strip, Marcie admitted loving "Chuck," so far as to affirming her willingness to marry Charlie Brown. Even this strip ended in a denial of sorts; Peppermint Patty brought Marcie up to the front desk of the hospital and tried to have her admitted as a patient, saying, "I think she's sicker than he is!"

Peppermint Patty often tries to talk to Charlie Brown about matters of the heart (often depicted with both characters sitting under a tree) and even calls him often on the phone (usually taking up the majority of the conversation), but Charlie Brown usually manages to somehow evade the issue, often by simply playing dumb. Peppermint Patty often grumbles, "I hate talking to you, Chuck!" whenever she tries to confide in him and he does not tell her what she wants to hear.

Peppermint Patty also developed a crush on Pig-Pen for a while in 1980, after Charlie Brown set them up on a date for a Valentine's Day dance. Later though, Peppermint Patty calls him and asks what the next time Pig-pen can dance with her, he says next year, which quickly breaks the romance up. Also, in the movie Bon Voyage, Charlie Brown, and don't come back!, both she and Marcie were shown as being attracted to Pierre, the son of their host family in Paris. Pierre only returned Marcie's affections, however, a fact to which Peppermint Patty remained oblivious even when they were holding hands right in front of her.

Peppermint Patty has a strong friendship with Snoopy, treating him like one of the children even after being told that he is a dog.

== Voiced by ==
- Gabrielle DeFaria Ritter (1967–1968)
- Christopher DeFaria (1969, 1971–1973)
- Donna Forman Le Tourneau (1974)
- Linda Ercoli (1974)
- Stuart Brotman (1975–1977)
- Laura Planting (1977, 1979)
- Patricia Patts (1979–1980)
- Brent Hauer (1980–1983)
- Victoria Vargas (1983)
- Kevin Brando (1983–1984)
- Gini Holtzman (1984–1985)
- Kristie Baker (1985–1986, 1988)
- Jason Muller (1988–1989)
- Nicole Buda (1989)
- Phillip Lucier (1992)
- Haley Peel (1994)
- Brittan Reese (1995–1997)
- Rachel Davey (2000)
- Emily Lalande (2002)
- Daniel Hansen (2003)
- Rory Thost (2006)
- Venus Omega Schultheis (2015)
- Lily Zager (2016)
- Riley Pettway (2018–2019)
- Isis Moore (2019–2021)
- Lexi Perri (2021–present)

== Family ==
Peppermint Patty's mother is never seen or mentioned. In the strip of September 27, 1973, Peppermint Patty simply says she doesn't have a mother. The fate of her mother is never revealed in the strip.

Peppermint Patty's father often calls Patty "a rare gem". In the cartoons his voice, like those of all adults, is heard as "wah-wahs" (made by musician Dean Hubbard).
