= Marcie =

Peanuts comic strip character

- Peanuts character
- First appearance: July 20, 1971 (First depicted); October 11, 1971 (First named)
- Voiced by: Jimmy Ahrens (1973–1976, 1977) Casey Carlson (1979–1981) Shannon Cohn (1981–1982) Michael Dockery (1983, 1985) Keri Houlihan (1984–1986, 1988) Jason Mendelson (1986) Tani Taylor Powers (1988) Marie Cole (1989) Lindsay Benesh (1992) Nicole Fisher (1994–1997) Ashley Edner (2000) Jessica D. Stone (2002) Melissa Montoya (2003) Jessica Gordon (2006) Rebecca Bloom (2015) Taylor Autumn Bertman (2016) Vasi Chris (2018-2019) Holly Gorski (2019–present) Arianna McDonald (2023) Josephine Nisbett (2026–present)

In-universe information
- Gender: Female
- Nationality: American

Marcie /ˈmɑːrsi/ is a fictional character featured in the long-running syndicated daily and Sunday comic strip Peanuts by Charles M. Schulz.

Marcie is a studious girl who is sometimes depicted as being terrible at sports. She is friends with the tomboyish and athletic Peppermint Patty. Marcie usually calls Peppermint Patty "sir", which annoys her. Marcie has a mostly unrequited crush on the character Charlie Brown.

Marcie has appeared outside the comic strip in numerous Peanuts television specials, cinematic films, theatrical plays, and video games.

== History ==
Marcie made her first appearance in the daily strip from July 20, 1971, but her name wasn't mentioned until the strip from October 11. The character was modeled after Elise Gallaway, the roommate of Patty Swanson, Charles M. Schulz's cousin and the inspiration for the Peppermint Patty character.

Schulz never gave Marcie a surname in the comic strip. In the 1994 animated special You're In the Super Bowl, Charlie Brown, Marcie's surname is given as "Johnson".

Marcie is spotlighted in her first special, Snoopy Presents: One-of-a-Kind Marcie, which premiered August 18, 2023, on Apple TV+.

=== Appearance ===
Marcie wears round glasses with opaque lenses and wears her dark brown (sometimes black) hair in a short bob style. In the animated specials, she also wears an orange T-shirt (colored red in the Apple TV+ specials and The Peanuts Movie). She and Peppermint Patty are the only girls in the strip to wear a T-shirt and shorts.

=== Personality ===
Marcie is best friends with Peppermint Patty, constantly addressing her as "sir" (she called her "sir" in her first line in the strip). Originally, Peppermint Patty kept telling Marcie to stop calling her that but eventually grows accustomed to it. Initially, Peppermint Patty addresses Marcie as "dorky" and, when talking to others, refers to her as "my weird friend from camp". While Peppermint Patty refers to Charlie Brown as "Chuck", Marcie usually calls him "Charles". Marcie is very intelligent and does well in school (a contrast with Peppermint Patty), but sometimes says that she is pressured by her parents' expectation of her to do well in school, and even that despite her young age, they have already chosen her college.

== Voice actors ==
Marcie has been played by many voice actors in animated Peanuts productions.

- Jimmy Ahrens (1973–1977)
- Casey Carlson (1977–1981)
- Shannon Cohn (1980–1982)
- Michael Dockery (1983, 1985)
- Keri Houlihan (1984–1986, 1988)
- Jason Mendelson (1986)
- Tani Taylor Powers (1988)
- Marie Cole (1989)
- Lindsay Benesh (1992)
- Nicole Fisher (1994–1997)
- Ashley Edner (2000)
- Jessica D. Stone (2002)
- Melissa Montoya (2003)
- Jessica Gordon (2006)
- Rebecca Bloom (2015)
- Taylor Autumn Bertman (2016)
- Vasi Chris (2018–2019)
- Holly Gorski (2019–2023)
- Molly Lewis (2023–present) (television)
- Arianna McDonald (2023–2025) (specials)
- Josephine Nisbett (2026–present) (specials)
