= Charlie Brown =

Peanuts comic strip character

- Peanuts character
- First appearance: October 2, 1950
- Last appearance: February 13, 2000 (comic strip); February 6, 2000 (final new drawing appearance)
- Created by: Charles M. Schulz
- Voiced by: See Voice actors

In-universe information
- Full name: Charles Brown
- Species: Human
- Gender: Male
- Family: Sally Brown (younger sister); Unnamed parents Silas Brown (paternal grandfather); Unnamed paternal grandmother Unnamed aunt Unnamed uncle Snoopy (pet)
- Nationality: American

Charles "Charlie" Brown is a fictional character and the principal protagonist of the American comic strip Peanuts, created by Charles M. Schulz and syndicated in daily and Sunday newspapers in numerous countries worldwide. Depicted as a "lovable loser", Charlie Brown is a popular and widely recognized cartoon character. Charlie Brown is characterized as a person who frequently suffers, and as a result, is usually nervous and lacks self-confidence. He shows both pessimistic and optimistic attitudes: on some days, he is apprehensive to even get out of bed because he cannot face the world, but on others, he hopes to accomplish things and is determined to do his best. Charlie Brown is easily recognized by his round head and trademark zigzag patterned shirt. His catchphrase is "Good grief".

Schulz said that Charlie Brown "has to be the one who suffers, because he is a caricature of the average person. Most of us are much more acquainted with losing than we are with winning." Despite this, Charlie Brown does not always suffer, as he has experienced some happy moments and victories through the years, and he has sometimes uncharacteristically shown self-assertiveness despite his frequent nervousness. Schulz also said: "I like to have Charlie Brown eventually be the focal point of almost every story." Charlie Brown is the only Peanuts character to have appeared regularly in the strip throughout its entire 50-year run.

Lee Mendelson, who produced most of the Peanuts television specials, has said of Charlie Brown that "He was, and is, the ultimate survivor in overcoming bulliness—Lucy or otherwise."

Charlie Brown is eight years old for most of the strip's floating timeline. Initially, he suggests he lives in an apartment, with his grandmother occupying the one above his; a few years into the strip, he moves to a house with a backyard. His father is a barber and his mother a housewife. He is always referred to as "Charlie Brown" and never simply "Charlie" by most of the other characters in the strip, including his sister, Sally (who also refers to him as "big brother") and Snoopy, his dog (who sometimes calls him "the round-headed kid"), with the exception of Peppermint Patty and Marcie who address him as "Chuck" and "Charles" respectively.

== History ==
=== 1940s–1950s ===
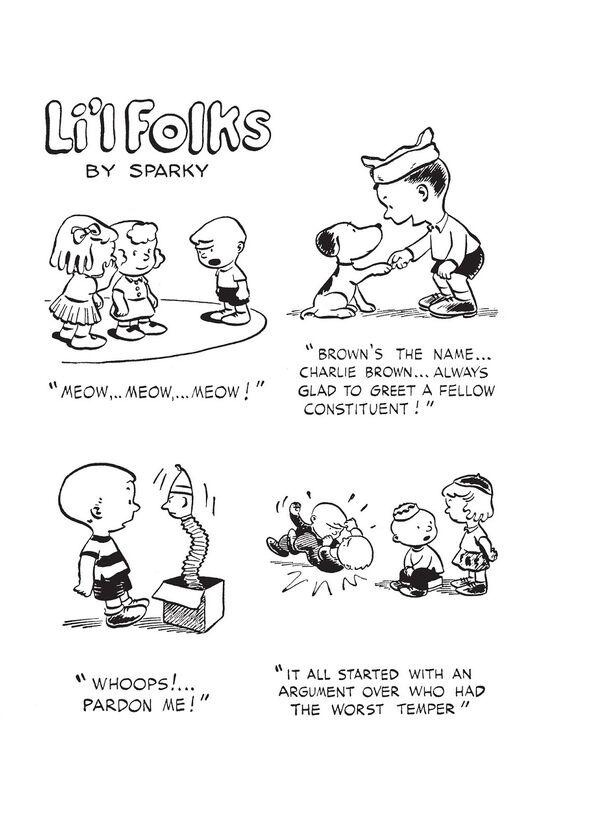
First appearance of a "Charlie Brown" from the May 30, 1948 strip of Li'l Folks.

The character's name was first used on May 30, 1948, in an early Schulz comic strip titled Li'l Folks. The character made his official debut in the first Peanuts comic strip on October 2, 1950. The strip features Charlie Brown walking by, as two other children named Shermy and Patty look at him. Shermy refers to him as "Good Ol' Charlie Brown" as he passes by, but then immediately reveals his hatred toward him once he is gone on the last panel. In the very early days of the strip, Charlie Brown was explicitly identified as being four years old; he would age very slowly over the next several years, being old enough to attend elementary school by the 1960s. During the strip's early years, Charlie Brown was much more impish and lighthearted and not the dour defeatist he would soon become. He was something of a smart-aleck and would often play pranks and jokes on the other characters. On December 21, 1950, his signature zig-zag pattern first appeared on his formerly plain T-shirt. By April 25, 1952, his T-shirt was changed to a polo shirt with a collar and the zig-zag. On the March 6, 1951 strip, Charlie Brown first appears to play baseball, as he was warming up before telling Shermy that they can start the game; however, he was the catcher and not yet the pitcher and manager of his team.

Charlie Brown's relationships with other Peanuts characters initially differed significantly from their later states, and their concepts were grown up through this decade until they reached their more-established forms. An example is his relationship with Violet Gray, to whom he was introduced in the February 7, 1951, strip. The two constantly remained on fairly good terms, a bit different from their later somewhat tepid relationship. In the August 16, 1951, strip, she called Charlie Brown a "blockhead", being the first time Charlie Brown was referred by that insult. The strip for November 14 of that year featured the first appearance of the famous football gag, with Violet in the role that would later be filled by Lucy van Pelt.

On May 30, 1951, Charlie Brown is introduced to Schroeder. As Schroeder is still a baby, Charlie Brown cannot converse with him. On June 1 of the same year, Charlie Brown stated that he felt like a father to Schroeder; in fact, for quite some time, he sometimes acted like a father to him, trying to teach him words and reading stories to him. On September 24 of that year, he taught Schroeder how to play the piano, the instrument which would later become Schroeder's trademark. On that year's October 10 strip, he told Schroeder the story of Beethoven and set in motion the piano player's obsession with the composer. Charlie Brown placed the Beethoven bust on Schroeder's piano on November 26, 1951. Later, Schroeder and Charlie Brown were portrayed as being about the same age, and Schroeder became Charlie Brown's closest friend after Linus Van Pelt. Schroeder became the catcher on Charlie Brown's baseball team for the first time in the April 12, 1952, strip.

In early 1959, Charlie Brown (and other Peanuts characters) made his first animated appearances after they were sponsored by the Ford Motor Company in commercials for its automobiles, as well as for intros to The Tennessee Ernie Ford Show.

=== 1960s ===
In the 1960s, the Peanuts comic strip entered what most readers consider to be its Golden Age, reaching its peak in popularity, becoming well known in numerous countries, with the strip reaching 355 million readers.

In 1965, the Coca-Cola Company approached Lee Mendelson about sponsoring a Peanuts Christmas television special. The next day Mendelson called Schulz and proposed a Christmas special featuring Charlie Brown and the Peanuts characters, in which he would collaborate with both Schulz and Melendez. Titled A Charlie Brown Christmas, the special was first broadcast by the CBS network on December 9, 1965. The special's primary goal is showing "the true meaning of Christmas". Before A Charlie Brown Christmas was broadcast, several of those involved in the special's creation were worried that it might be poorly received, with its unorthodox soundtrack and overt religious message; however, it turned out to be a huge success, with the number of homes watching the special an estimated 15,490,000, placing it at number two in the ratings, behind Bonanza on NBC. The special's music score made an equally pervasive impact on viewers who would later perform jazz, among them David Benoit and George Winston. A Charlie Brown Christmas was honored with both an Emmy and Peabody Award.

The success of A Charlie Brown Christmas was followed by the creation of a second CBS television special, Charlie Brown's All-Stars, which was originally broadcast on June 8, 1966. A third CBS Peanuts special was broadcast on October 27, 1966: the Halloween-themed It's the Great Pumpkin, Charlie Brown.

The stage adaptation of a concept album titled You're a Good Man, Charlie Brown, based on Charlie Brown, Snoopy, Lucy, Linus, Schroeder, and Patty, went into rehearsal in New York City on February 10, 1967. Before its opening, the musical had no actual libretto; it was several vignettes with dialogue adapted from Peanuts strips and a musical number for each one. On March 7, 1967, the musical premiered off-Broadway at Theatre 80 in the East Village, featuring Gary Burghoff as Charlie Brown.

On December 4, 1969, A Boy Named Charlie Brown, the first feature-length animated film based on Peanuts was released. The film was a box office success, earning 6 million dollars at the box office, against its $1 million budget. The film was generally well received by critics.

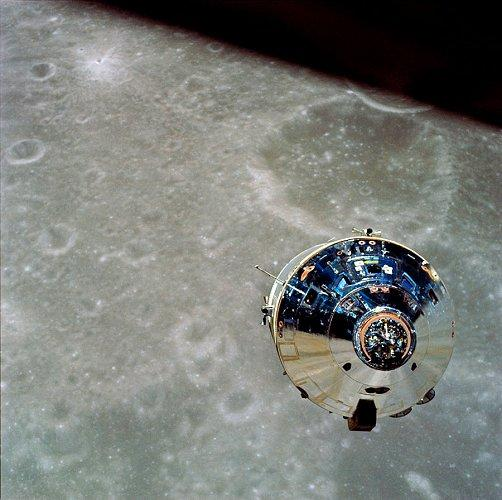
The Command Module of Apollo 10 which was named after Charlie Brown

Charlie Brown and Snoopy reached new heights on May 18, 1969, when they became the names of the command module and lunar module, respectively, for the Apollo 10 mission. While not included in the official mission logo, Charlie Brown and Snoopy became semi-official mascots for the mission. Charles Schulz drew an original picture of Charlie Brown in a spacesuit; this drawing was hidden aboard the craft to be found by the astronauts once they were in orbit. Its current location is on a display at the Kennedy Space Center.

=== 1970s ===
During the 1970s, Charlie Brown appeared in twelve Peanuts television specials that were produced as a result of the success of the earlier TV specials. Charlie Brown also appeared in two animated feature films (Snoopy Come Home and Race for Your Life, Charlie Brown, released on August 9, 1972, and August 24, 1977, respectively).

=== 1980s ===
Fourteen more Peanuts television specials were produced in the 1980s, two of which were musicals (one is the animated version of You're A Good Man, Charlie Brown).

Another full-length animated Peanuts film, titled Bon Voyage, Charlie Brown (and Don't Come Back!!) was released on May 30, 1980.

=== 1990s ===
Six television specials featuring Charlie Brown were produced during this decade.

Within the comic strip, Charlie Brown began to date Peggy Jean. The relationship lasted for roughly nine years.

=== Final comic strip appearance ===
Charlie Brown made his final appearance in the very last original Peanuts strip, which was published on February 13, 2000—the day following Schulz's death. Despite ending its original run in 2000, repeats of the comic strip are still being published as of 2026.

=== Post-comic strip appearances ===
After the comic strip ended, Charlie Brown continued to appear in more television specials. On November 20, 2006, the special He's a Bully, Charlie Brown beat a Madonna concert special with its 10 million views, although Peanuts was no longer in its heyday. As of 2016, the latest of Charlie Brown's original television appearances is Happiness Is a Warm Blanket, Charlie Brown, which premiered March 31, 2011.

=== The Peanuts Movie ===
An animated film starring Charlie Brown, The Peanuts Movie, was released on November 6, 2015. The film was directed by Steve Martino, produced by Blue Sky Studios, and distributed by 20th Century Fox. The director said of the character: "We've all been Charlie Brown at one point in our lives".

The film received largely positive reviews from critics and audiences alike, and grossed $246 million worldwide against its $99 million budget, making it a box office success.

== Inspiration ==
Charlie Brown's traits and experiences are inspired by those of Schulz, who admitted in interviews that he had often felt shy and withdrawn in his life. In an interview on Charlie Rose in May 1997, Schulz observed: "I suppose there's a melancholy feeling in a lot of cartoonists, because cartooning, like all other humor, comes from bad things happening." Furthermore, both Charlie Brown's and Schulz's fathers were barbers, and their mothers housewives. Charlie Brown and some of his friends, such as Linus and Frieda, were named after good friends of Schulz, and Peppermint Patty was inspired by Patricia Swanson, one of Schulz's cousins on his mother's side. Schulz devised the character's name when he saw peppermint candies in his house. Even Charlie Brown's unrequited love for the Little Red-Haired Girl was inspired by Schulz's own love for Donna Mae Johnson, an Art Instruction Inc. accountant. When Schulz finally proposed to her in June 1950, shortly after he had made his first contract with his syndicate, she turned him down and married another man.

== Personality ==
Charlie Brown is characterized as a shy, meek, kind, naive boy with many anxieties.

Charlie Brown is normally referred to by his full name (with the exceptions of Peppermint Patty who calls him "Chuck", Marcie, Eudora, Violet and Emily who call him 'Charles', Peggy Jean who calls him "Brownie Charles", and Sally Brown who calls him "Big Brother", though on extremely rare occasions, Lucy, Violet, Patty and Frieda did call him just "Charlie"). Charlie Brown's catchphrase is "good grief". Like Schulz, Charlie Brown is the son of a barber. The character is an example of "the great American un-success story" in that he fails in almost everything he does with an almost continuous streak of bad luck; but still keeps trying with huge efforts and work, resulting in either more losses or (very rarely) great victories. Some of these victories are hitting a game-winning home run off a pitch by a minor character named Royanne in a strip from 1993, and his victory over Joe Agate (another minor character) in a game of marbles in a strip from 1995. Although Charlie Brown is often unlucky within the strip's storylines, in some ways Charles M. Schulz created through the ever-persevering character "the most shining example of the American success story in the comic strip field."

Charlie Brown cares very deeply for his family and friends, even if he was maltreated by them. His care for his sister is shown on a strip from May 26, 1959, when he reacts to the birth of his sister Sally by exclaiming "A BABY SISTER?! I'M A FATHER! I mean my DAD's a father! I'm a brother! I have a baby sister! I'm a brother!" Two strips later, Charlie Brown continues the celebration of her birth by handing over chocolate cigars to his friends. When Charlie Brown was maltreated by his companions (most often Lucy, Violet and Patty), he does not usually take out his anger on them, but often retaliates and even manages to turn the tables. An example is a strip from 1951, which features Violet and Patty telling Charlie Brown that they are not going to invite him to their party, with Charlie Brown replying that he does not wish to go to their "dumb ol' party" anyway, leading the two girls to invite him.

Christopher Caldwell has stated that "What makes Charlie Brown such a rich character is that he's not purely a loser. The self-loathing that causes him so much anguish is decidedly not self-effacement. Charlie Brown is optimistic enough to think he can earn a sense of self-worth, and his willingness to do so by exposing himself to humiliations is the dramatic engine that drives the strip. The greatest of Charlie Brown's virtues is his resilience, which is to say his courage. Charlie Brown is ambitious. He manages the baseball team. He's the pitcher, not a scrub. He may be a loser, but he's, strangely, a leader at the same time. This makes his mood swings truly bipolar in their magnificence: he vacillates not between kinda happy and kinda unhappy, but between being a "hero" and being a "goat"."

=== Birthday and age ===
Charlie Brown's age is neither normally specified nor consistently given. His birthday occurs in the strip published on October 30, 1950. He is four years old in a strip published November 3, 1950, making his birth year around 1946. He aged slowly over the next two decades of the strip's floating timeline, being six years old as of November 17, 1957, and "eight-and-a-half years old" by July 11, 1979. Other references continue to peg Charlie Brown as being approximately eight years old. A strip published on April 3, 1971, suggests he was born around 1963 (setting up the gag that when he is 21, it will be 1984).

== Voice actors ==
- Peter Robbins (1963–1969)
- Chris Inglis (1971)
- Chad Webber (1972–1973)
- Todd Barbee (1973–1974)
- Duncan Watson (1975–1977)
- Dylan Beach (1976)
- Arrin Skelley (1977–1980)
- Liam Martin (1978)
- Michael Mandy (1980–1982)
- Grant Wehr (1981)
- Brad Kesten (1983–1985)
- Michael Catalano (1983)
- Brett Johnson (1984–1985)
- Kevin Brando (1984–1985; singing voice)
- Chad Allen (1986)
- Sean Collins (1988)
- Jason Riffle (1988)
- Erin Chase (1988–1989)
- Susan Sheridan (1988; Nationwide Building Society commercial)
- Kaleb Henley (1990)
- Phillip Shafran (1991)
- Justin Shenkarow (1992)
- Jamie E. Smith (1992)
- Jimmy Guardino (1993)
- Steven Hartman (1995–1997)
- Quinn Beswick (2000)
- Miles Purinton (2002)
- Wesley Singerman (2002–2003)
- Adam Taylor Gordon (2003)
- Spencer Robert Scott (2006)
- John Adam Plenge (2007)
- Alex Ferris (2008–2010)
- Trenton Rogers (2011)
- Tony Terraciano (2013–2015; MetLife commercials)
- Noah Schnapp (2015)
- Kelly Jean Badgley (2015; Teleflora commercial)
- Aiden Lewandowski (2016)
- Gaston Scardovi-Mounier (2018–2019)
- Ethan Pugiotto (2019–2022)
- Tyler James Nathan (2021–2023)
- Etienne Kellici (2021, 2022, 2023–2025)
- Jayd Deroché (2025, singing voice)
- Riley Vargas (2026–present)

== Reception ==
Charlie Brown, along with Snoopy, was ranked eighth on TV Guide's 50 Greatest Cartoon Characters of All Time.

=== Shrine of the Eternals ===
Charlie Brown was inducted into the Baseball Reliquary's Shrine of the Eternals in 2017. Similar in concept to the National Baseball Hall of Fame, criteria for inclusion in the Shrine of the Eternals differs in that statistical achievement is not a primary consideration for induction, and fictional characters are eligible for induction. Charlie Brown was the first fictional character inducted to the Shrine.
