= The Snoopy Show =

Animated streaming television series (2021–2023)

- Genre: Comedy
- Based on: Peanuts by Charles Schulz
- Developed by: Rob Boutilier; Mark Evestaff; Alex Galatis
- Directed by: Rob Boutilier; Steve Evangelatos; Behzad Mansoori-Dara; Mélanie Daigle; Ridd Sorensen
- Voices of: Terry McGurrin; Rob Tinkler; Ethan Pugiotto; Tyler Nathan; Etienne Kellici; Isabella Leo; Hattie Kragten; Wyatt White; Milo Toriel-McGibbon; Holly Gorski; Isis Moore; Jacob Soley; Christian Dal Dosso; Caleb Bellavance; Matthew Mucci
- Composer: Jeff Morrow
- Countries of origin: Canada; United States
- Original language: English
- No. of seasons: 3
- No. of episodes: 39 (117 segments) (list of episodes)

Production
- Executive producers: Josh Scherba; Anne Loi; Stephanie Betts; Paige Braddock; Craig Schulz; Mark Evestaff
- Producer: Kimberly Small
- Running time: 22 minutes (7 minutes per segment)
- Production companies: WildBrain Studios; Schulz Studio

Original release
- Network: Apple TV+
- Release: February 5, 2021 – December 1, 2023

The Snoopy Show is an animated television series inspired by the Peanuts comic strip by Charles M. Schulz. Developed by Rob Boutilier, Mark Evestaff, and Alex Galatis, and produced by WildBrain, it debuted on February 5, 2021, on Apple TV+. It is the second Peanuts animated series produced for the streaming service, following Snoopy in Space. Each episode consists of three 7-minute segments. Season 2 premiered with the first half on March 11, 2022 while the next half of the season premiered on August 12, 2022. A holiday special was released on December 2, 2022. Season 3 was released on June 9, 2023. A second holiday special was released on December 1, 2023. Well known writers that worked on the show were Bobby Gaylor, Tom Ruegger, Kevin Burke and Chris "Doc" Wyatt.

== Cast and characters ==
- Terry McGurrin as Snoopy
- Robert Tinkler as Woodstock and Spike
- Ethan Pugiotto (S1E1-S2E3, S2E7, S2E13), Tyler James Nathan (S2E4-S2E12) and Etienne Kellici (S3) as Charlie Brown
- Isabella Leo as Lucy van Pelt and Patty
- Hattie Kragten as Sally Brown and Violet
- Wyatt White as Linus van Pelt and Shermy
- Milo Toriel-McGibbon (S1-2) and Kingston Crooks (S3) as Rerun van Pelt
- Holly Gorski (S1E1-S3E1) and Molly Lewis (S3E2-S3E13) as Marcie
- Isis Moore (S1-2) and Lexi Perri (S3) as Peppermint Patty
- Jacob Soley as Pig-Pen
- Christian Dal Dosso (S1-S2E4, S2E7, S2E13) and Caleb Bellavance (S2E5-S3E13) as Franklin
- Matthew Mucci as Schroeder
- Katie Griffin as Belle
- Cory Doran as Marbles
- Mark Edwards as Andy
- Seán Cullen as Bird Bud #1 and Olaf
- Julie Lemieux as Bird Bud #2
- David Berni as Bird Bud #3
- Maya Misaljevic as Frieda
- Will Bhaneja as Shermy
- Natasha Nathan as Patty
- Charlie Boyle as Violet Gray

== Episodes ==
Season	Segments	Episodes	Originally released	
Season	Segments	Episodes	First released	Last released
1	39	13	February 5, 2021	July 9, 2021
2	39	13	March 11, 2022	December 2, 2022
3	39	13	June 9, 2023	December 1, 2023

== Production ==
The show was formally announced on October 1, 2020, alongside the release of a teaser trailer. A second trailer for the series followed in January 2021, prior to the series' premiere date. In order to create this show, the producers needed to follow several rules:

- No adults are to be seen or heard.
- Never show the interior of Snoopy's doghouse.
- No technology produced beyond the 1970s can be featured.

Rob Boutilier serves as the series' Supervising Director, with Ridd Sorensen, Behzah Mansoori-Dara, Mélanie Daigle, and Steve Evangelatos also directing episodes. In addition to co-writing the second and third episodes, Alex Galatis serves as the Executive Story Editor. Josh Scherba, Anne Loi, Stephanie Betts, Paige Braddock, Craig Schulz, and Mark Evestaff (who also co-wrote the second episode) executive produce.

== Reception ==
On review aggregator Rotten Tomatoes, The Snoopy Show holds an approval rating of 100% based on 6 reviews, with an average score 8.33/10. On Metacritic, the series has a weighted average score of 73 out of 100, based on 5 critics, indicating "generally favorable reviews". The Michigan Daily praised the show, calling it "so darn wholesome". Common Sense Media gave the show a 4/5.

=== Accolades ===
Year	Award	Category	Nominee(s)	Result	Ref.
2021	Leo Awards	Best Animation Series	The Snoopy Show	Won	
2021	Leo Awards	Best Direaction Animation Series	Steve Evangelatos, Behzad Mansoori, Ridd Sorensen and Rob Boutilier ("Happiness Is A Dancing Dog")	Nominated	
2021	Leo Awards	Best Sound Animation Series	Todd Araki, Marcel Duperreault, Jason Fredrickson, Adam McGhie and Andrew Downton ("Better Off Beagle")	Nominated	
2022	Canadian Screen Awards	Best Animated Program or Series	The Snoopy Show	Nominated	
2022	Canadian Screen Awards	Best Sound in an Animated Program or Series	Todd Araki, Jason Fredrickson, Adam McGhie, Marcel Duperreault and Andrew Downton ("Happiness Is a Dancing Dog")	Nominated	
2022	Canadian Screen Awards	Best Directing in an Animated program or series	Behzad Mansoori-Dara and Rob Boutilier ("Good Luck, Chuck")	Nominated	
2022	Leo Awards	Best Animation Series	The Snoopy Show	Won	
2022	Leo Awards	Best Direaction Animation Series	Rob Boutilier, Ridd Sorensen, Behzad Mansoori, Steve Evangelatos ("Beagle Appreciation Day")	Nominated	
2022	Leo Awards	Best Sound Animation Series	Todd Araki, Andrew Downton, Marcel Duperreault, Jason Fredrickson, Adam McGhie ("Beagle Appreciation Day")	Nominated	
2022	Leo Awards	Best Character Animation in an Animation Series	Katie Winchester ("The Beagle Is In")	Won	
2022	Leo Awards	Best Character Animation in an Animation Series	Eileen Lin ("Happiness is the Gift of Giving")	Nominated	
2023	Canadian Screen Awards	Best Animated Program or Series	The Snoopy Show	Won	
2023	Canadian Screen Awards	Best Performance in an animated program or series	Hattie Kragten	Nominated	
2023	Canadian Screen Awards	Best Sound in an Animated Program or Series	Todd Araki, Andrew Downton, Marcel Duperreault, Jason Fredrickson and Adam McGhie ("Happiness Is Your Favourite Thing")	Nominated	
2023	Canadian Screen Awards	Best Original Music, Animation	Jeff Morrow	Nominated	
2023	Canadian Screen Awards	Best Writing in an Animated program or series	Scott Montgomery ("Snoopy Swap")	Nominated	
