= Dog Sees God: Confessions of a Teenage Blockhead =

2005 play

- Original language: English
- Written by: Bert V. Royal
- Characters: CB; CB's Sister; Van; Matt; Beethoven; Tricia York; Marcy; Van's Sister
- Subject: Imagining characters from the comic strip Peanuts as teenagers
- Genre: Drama, satire, parody

Premiere
- Date: August 2004
- Place: SoHo Playhouse as part of FringeNYC

Dog Sees God: Confessions of a Teenage Blockhead is a 2004 American play written by Bert V. Royal.

An "unauthorized continuation," the play reimagines characters from the comic strip Peanuts as degenerate teenagers. Substance abuse, eating disorders, teen violence, rebellion, sexual relations and identity are among the issues covered in this homage to the works of Charles M. Schulz.

== Characters ==
- CB (Charlie Brown) is the main character in the play. He is intensely saddened over the death of his dog, and is forced to question both his sexuality and his social status when he unwittingly falls for his classmate Beethoven.
- Beethoven (Schroeder) has embraced his life as an outcast prior to events in the play. A bit of a recluse, Beethoven takes solace in playing the piano, but when he and CB become romantically involved, he's subjected to a world of unwanted attention.
- CB's Sister (Sally) is in the midst of "an eternal identity crisis," often trying on bold and fringe personalities and philosophies, from wiccan to punk to pirate throughout the course of the show. Her unrequited crush on Beethoven leads to her heartbreak when his relationship with her brother is publicly revealed.
- Van (Linus), always the philosopher in childhood, is now a pothead with a worldview to match. He numbs his frequently intellectual and thoughtful mind with marijuana and as a result is often depicted as the least connected and emotionally unaffected throughout the events of the play.
- Matt (Pig-Pen) has become CB's best friend and a self-aggrandizing alpha male whose childhood neglect has left him a compulsive germaphobe, with an increasingly short-fuse. His good looks just barely mask the rampant misogyny, homophobia, and rage that ultimately comes to a boiling point when his close bond with CB is threatened by CB's feelings for Beethoven, the most frequent target of Matt's malice and ridicule.
- Tricia (Peppermint Patty), a party girl, fancies herself the most popular girl in school, but is still attached at the hip to her sidekick Marcy. She is deeply image obsessed. Her own delusions and desperation to be perceived as "pretty" and "popular" become more and more transparent over the course of the play.
- Marcy (Marcie), Tricia's sidekick. Her role as Tricia's follower is as apparent as ever while the intellect she held in her youth has been seemingly neglected and pushed aside to make room for more important things like boys and mixology. At the start of the play she is pursuing a romantic relationship with CB, but following his public outing with Beethoven, she switches her attention to Matt. Ultimately, destined to end up alone... at Tricia's side.
- Van's Sister (Lucy) is mysteriously and noticeably absent throughout the first half of the play, before it is ultimately revealed has been institutionalized for setting the Little Red-Haired Girl's hair on fire in biology class. She was CB's on-again, off-again girlfriend before being taken away and, in the play, serves as his moral confidante and guides him as he attempts to break his status quo.
- Pen Pal does not appear in person, but has a key part in the play. This character additionally alludes to being a representation of God; he/she/it has a clear picture of an afterlife and signs letters with the initials CS (Charles Schulz)
- Frieda is never seen, but referred to numerous times as having an eating disorder. She is depicted as a nemesis to Tricia who hates her and openly comments crass criticism on her weight and beliefs. It is revealed through Van that this animosity is completely one sided as Frieda never talks about Tricia.
- Rerun, Shermy, and Franklin are all mentioned as being guests at Marcy’s party.

== Plot ==
CB and CB's sister have a funeral for their dog, who recently contracted rabies and was put down after killing "a little yellow bird" and nearly biting CB. The funeral ends in failure as they argue over who should say a prayer for him. After the funeral, CB approaches Van and asks him what happens to humans when they die. He answers that they get reincarnated. When CB asks Matt the same question, Beethoven walks by and Matt calls him a fag.

At lunch, Marcy and Tricia tell their friends about an upcoming party at Marcy's house. Later on, CB goes to Beethoven's practice room to listen to his piano playing, but ends up monologuing over his dead dog. An irritated Beethoven tells CB about how he cannot go through his day without someone bullying him in some sort, including CB himself. CB claims that he never meant any harm, but Beethoven counters that people "messing around" with him is just a front for harassment and violence. CB makes a truce with Beethoven and invites him to the party to re-establish their friendship. They share a kiss.

Beethoven arrives at the party to everyone's surprise. Matt insults Beethoven again, but CB comes to Beethoven's defense and kisses him, this time in front of everyone. After abruptly leaving the party with CB, Beethoven demands an explanation for what happened. CB explains he revealed his feelings not out of obligation to Beethoven, but because he truly wanted to do so. The morning after, Matt, Tricia, and Marcy all wake up together, half-naked and wondering what happened between them the night before. CB goes to visit Van's sister, who was institutionalized for setting the Little Red-Haired Girl's hair on fire. CB tells her the whole story, also revealing to her that he and Beethoven had sex after the party.

A few days later, Matt, Tricia, Marcy, and Van eat lunch together and are all stunned at what happened at the party. Matt vows to make Beethoven pay for "fucking with [his] best friend's head." Meanwhile, CB and Beethoven argue over whether or not they should be in a relationship. CB leaves disappointed but hopeful for the future between them. Matt then enters and threatens Beethoven to stay away from CB. Beethoven refuses, calls him by his old nickname, Pig-Pen, and implies he knows Matt's "secret": that Matt has repressed homosexual feelings for CB. This angers Matt, who slams the piano top over Beethoven's hands, breaking them. During class later on, CB's friends take turns sharing fond memories of Beethoven, who had committed suicide (Matt, meanwhile, was suspended from school for a week). However, knowing they all bullied Beethoven, CB berates them for pretending that they actually cared about him.

CB receives a letter from his pen pal. In the letter, he tells CB that he must keep strong, even in rough times. It also mentions a boy "who plays piano just like [CB's] friend" that moved in near the pen pal, that "he's had a tough life, but things are better for him, now," and that he found a dog who likes to sing along to the piano (like CB's dog did, alluding that Beethoven is now caring for CB's dog in the afterlife). The letter is signed "CS", an allusion to Peanuts creator Charles M. Schulz.

== Intellectual property ==
Dog Sees God is a parody, and has not been authorized or approved in any manner by the Charles M. Schulz Estate or United Features Syndicate, which have no responsibility for its content.

== Development and production history ==
Dog Sees God was first presented as a reading on May 3, 2004, at the Barrow Street Theatre. It was directed by Anthony Barrile and produced by Sorrel Tomlinson. It had its world premiere at the 2004 New York International Fringe Festival, where it was presented at the SoHo Playhouse, directed by Susan W. Lovell and produced by Sorrel Tomilinson of File 14 Productions. It had another reading on May 9, 2005, at the Westside Theater, directed by Trip Cullman and produced by DeDe Harris and Sorrel Tomlinson.

Dog Sees God received its off-Broadway premiere by Martian Entertainment and Dede Harris at the Century Center for the Performing Arts, opening on December 15, 2005. Presented by Bert V. Royal, the play was directed by the Trip Cullman; the set design was by David Korins; the costume design was by Jenny Mannis; the lighting design was by Brian MacDevitt; the sound design was by Darron L. West; The fight direction was by Rick Sordelet; the general manager was Roy Gabay; the production stage manager was Lori Ann Zepp; the assistant stage manager was Tammy Scozzafava; and the production manager was Randall Etheredge. In February 2006, Eliza Dushku (who played Van's Sister) along with several other members of the cast quit the show and attempts were made to tie their leaving to a lawsuit between the producers. Charges of abuse against one of the producers were later dismissed as "plainly devoid of merit and undertaken as a vindictive campaign to harass".

The Los Angeles premiere of the play was presented by the Havok Theatre Company and ran from June 7 - July 20, 2008 at the Hudson Backstage Theatre. It was directed by Nick DeGruccio. Christine Lakin won an LA Weekly Theatre Award for Best Female Comedy Performance for her role in the play as Tricia.

The UK premiere production took place at the Taurus Bar on the famous Canal Street in Manchester in March 2008, thanks to author Bert V. Royal helping them secure the UK rights, which at that time did not exist (after this production the UK rights were set up). The show was a sell out and quickly transferred to the larger venue, The Lowry in Salford, in January 2009. The production gained rave reviews and now looks set to move in to return in 2012. The play was produced by Award Nominated Vertigo Theatre Productions and directed by Craig Hepworth.

The Canadian premiere production took place at Six Degrees in Toronto, Ontario, in March 2009. The show was produced by Michael Rubinoff and Lindsay Rosen, and directed by Lezlie Wade, with set and costume design by Jessica Poirier-Chang and lighting by Renee Brode. The Toronto Star gave it a 3 1/2-out-of-4-stars review, saying "What seems to be a comedic deconstruction of the famous Peanuts cartoon characters turns out to be one of the most interesting and moving plays I've seen this year, with some absolutely stunning performances. Director Lezlie Wade manages the transition skilfully and, by the end, there were totally unexpected tears rolling down my face."

A 20th anniversary production was presented by Second Wind Entertainment in June 2024 at the Hudson MainStage Theatre in Los Angeles. The production featured an updated script from Royal, and was directed by Ryan Warren.

A reading of the updated script was held in November 2025 in New York City with plans to return to the New York stage. The presentation was directed by Ryan Warren, cast by Zachary Spiegel, and general managed by Evan Bernardin. The reading came as the show celebrates the 20th Anniversary of its Off-Broadway debut.

== Cast ==
Character	Off-Broadway				Los Angeles (2008)	United Kingdom (2008)	Canada (2009)	Los Angeles (2024)	New York reading (2025)
Character	First reading (2004)	FringeNYC (2004)	Second reading (2005)	Premiere (2005)	Los Angeles (2008)	United Kingdom (2008)	Canada (2009)	Los Angeles (2024)	New York reading (2025)
CB	Alexander Chaplin	Michael Gladis	Patrick Fugit	Eddie Kaye Thomas	Joseph Porter	Rick Carter	Jake Epstein	Marcus Wells	Jack Dylan Grazer
CB's Sister	Karen DiConcetto	Karen DiConcetto	Alison Pill	America Ferrera	Andrea Bowen	Abby Simmons Louise Allen	Tatiana Maslany	Ellee Jo Trowbridge	Julia Lester
Van	Daniel Franzese	Tate Ellington Daniel Franzese	John Gallagher Jr.	Keith Nobbs	Erin Dinsmore	Stuart Reeve	Adamo Ruggiero	Anthony Turpel	Milo Manheim
Matt	Marcus Chait	Jay Sullivan	Mark Webber	Ian Somerhalder	Nick Ballard	Greg Kelly Mike Gates	Mike Lobel	Colin McCalla	Colin McCalla
Beethoven	Daniel Letterle	Benjamin Schrader	Logan Marshall Green	Logan Marshall Green	Wyatt Fenner	Craig Hepworth	Ben Lewis	Mateo Gonzales	Deandre Sevon
Tricia	Mary Catherine Garrison	Bridget Barkan	Michelle Trachtenberg	Kelli Garner	Christine Lakin	Adele Stanhope	Siobhan Murphy	Isabella Coben	Bebe Wood
Marcy	Melissa Picarello	Stelianie Tekmitchov	Anna Paquin	Ari Graynor	Lauren Robyne	Emma Salt	Alex Saslove	Addyson Bell	Dylan Mulvaney
Van's Sister	Jennifer Esposito	Melissa Picarello	Carly Jibson	Eliza Dushku	Megan McNulty	Emma Willcox	Paula Brancati	Natalie Bourgeois	Elizabeth Gillies
Other characters		Clay Black and Andrew Fleischer (understudies)					Lindsay Clark (female swing)		

== Awards ==
In 2004, it was one of the breakout hits at the New York International Fringe Festival, winning the Excellence Award for Best Overall Production, as well as Theatermania's Play Award of 2004, the GLAAD Media Award for Best Off-Off-Broadway production, Broadway.com's 2006 Audience Award for Favorite Off-Broadway Production and the 2006 HX Award for Best Play.

== Sequel ==
On July 24, 2014, it was announced on the official Facebook page that a sequel to the play was in the works. This sequel was to focus on Matt, and was going to be titled The Gospel According to Matt: Confessions of a Teenage Dirtbag.
