= Snoopy Presents: For Auld Lang Syne =

2021 Peanuts streaming animated special

- Official release poster
- Based on: Peanuts by Charles M. Schulz
- Teleplay by: Alex Galatis; Scott Montgomery; Clay Kaytis
- Story by: Alex Galatis; Scott Montgomery
- Directed by: Clay Kaytis
- Starring: Etienne Kellici; Isabella Leo; Wyatt White; Terry McGurrin; Rob Tinkler; Hattie Kragten; Lexi Perri; Holly Gorski; Caleb Bellavance
- Composer: Jeff Morrow
- Country of origin: Canada; United States
- Original language: English

Production
- Executive producers: Craig Schulz; Bryan Schulz; Cornelius Uliano; Paige Braddock; Josh Scherba; Stephanie Betts; Amir Nasrabadi; Anne Loi
- Producer: James Brown
- Running time: 38 minutes
- Production companies: WildBrain Studios; Peanuts Worldwide; Schulz Studio

Original release
- Network: Apple TV+
- Release: December 10, 2021

Related
- Happy New Year, Charlie Brown (1986); Happiness Is a Warm Blanket, Charlie Brown (2011); Snoopy Presents: It's The Small Things, Charlie Brown (2022)

Snoopy Presents: For Auld Lang Syne, or simply For Auld Lang Syne, is the 46th Peanuts animated special. It is the first Peanuts special produced for Apple TV+, the first Peanuts special since Happiness Is a Warm Blanket, Charlie Brown ten years prior, the first Peanuts holiday special since I Want a Dog for Christmas, Charlie Brown eighteen years prior, and the second special about New Year's Eve. It revolves around Lucy, who throws a New Year's Eve party to cheer herself up after her grandmother fails to show up for Christmas. The special was released exclusively on Apple TV+ on December 10, 2021. It was nominated for Best Animated Special Production at the 49th Annie Awards.

== Plot ==
On the first week of December, Lucy begins Christmas preparations for the arrival of her grandmother, whom she loves dearly. Meanwhile, Charlie Brown tries to finish his New Year's resolutions, which, in typical fashion, he fails to do any of. Lucy compacts them to two specific ones: build a snowman (which he immediately fails at) and do something "remotely" creative. Elsewhere, Snoopy celebrates the arrival of his siblings. Spike, only having a childhood photo of him and the others, tries to take a new current photo, but is constantly stymied by bad luck.

On Christmas Eve, Lucy is distraught to learn that her grandmother is not coming this year (her reason is unknown) and solemnly worries that she is unloved. In an effort to feel better, she decides to throw a New Year's Eve party at an old abandoned theater, which she manages to rent with the numerous nickels Charlie Brown has paid her over the years. She invites everyone and has Charlie Brown be in charge of decorations, with the other kids also helping out. Snoopy's family gets invited to play live music at the party; however, when Spike's camera is accidentally destroyed, Spike decides to leave, saddening the dogs.

The party does not go the way Lucy wants, as everyone finds her rules boring. Soon, everyone becomes miserable as Lucy tries to get Linus to save the party, but he instead snaps back at Lucy for trying to make it about herself instead of her friends. As everyone leaves, Charlie Brown accidentally knocks down the decorations, essentially failing his second resolution. Snoopy and his siblings find Spike at the bus stop afterwards and apologize for what happened before. As Lucy misses the New Year hour, Charlie Brown meets with Linus and learns why Lucy was upset to begin with, empathizing with her.

Linus finds Lucy in her bedroom and reminds her that he loves her no matter what. Charlie Brown arrives to give words of encouragement and reveals that he brought everyone from the party after explaining the situation. Everyone pretends to restart the countdown as Lucy finally has a party that satisfies everyone, Franklin takes a good photo of Snoopy and his siblings together, and Lucy helps Charlie Brown with another New Year's resolution by immediately crossing it off: Being a good friend. The party ends with all the kids singing Auld Lang Syne in unison. Sometime later, Lucy talks to her grandmother on the phone about her plans to come and visit them for her birthday, which she is looking forward to.

== Cast ==
- Etienne Kellici as Charlie Brown
- Terry McGurrin as Snoopy
- Rob Tinkler as Woodstock, Spike, and Olaf
- Lexi Perri as Peppermint Patty
- Isabella Leo as Lucy
- Wyatt White as Linus
- Hattie Kragten as Sally
- Holly Gorski as Marcie
- Caleb Bellavance as Franklin
- Natasha Nathan as Patty
- Charlie Boyle as Violet
- Jacob Soley as Pigpen
- Matthew Mucci as Schroeder
- Jackson Reid as Thibault and Maynard
- Will Bhaneja as Shermy
- Jacob Mazeral as José Peterson
- Lucas Nguyen as Floyd
- Katie Griffin as Belle
- Mark Edwards as Andy
- Cory Doran as Marbles
- Harley Ruznisky as Tapioca Pudding
- Maya Misaljevic as Frieda

== Production ==
On October 19, 2020, Apple had signed a deal to acquire the streaming rights to the Peanuts holiday specials for Apple TV+, including orders for new specials to be produced for the service. On October 4, 2021, Apple had announced the release date and title for the special, with the trailer following on November 29.

== Reception ==
The special was well received by critics and fans. Common Sense Media rated the film 4 out of 5, adding: "Peanuts New Year's movie is cute but not iconic." Joel Keller from Decider.com also rated it highly, saying, "Shifting the perspective to the usually confident Lucy, and showing a moment where she has a lack of confidence, is refreshing and welcome." Chuck Wilson from The Village Voice also praised the special, saying, "Kaytis and co-writers Alex Galatis and Scott Montgomery transform Lucy from a character of nostalgia into a girl as self-reflective and searching as any young person watching the special might be. Her crisis of self is sure to resonate, and that’s a triumph not only for Kaytis and company but for the late Charles Schulz, who gave his characters the gifts of grace and intelligence but also melancholy and doubt."

=== Accolades ===
Award	Date of ceremony	Category	Recipient(s)	Result	Ref(s).
Annie Awards	March 12, 2022	Best Animated Special Production	Snoopy Presents: For Auld Lang Syne	Nominated	
Leo Awards	July 6, 2022	Best Animation Program	James Brown, Josh Scherba, Stephanie Betts, Anne Loi, Amir Nasrabadi, Paige Braddock, Craig Schulz, Bryan Schulz, Cornelius Uliano	Nominated	
Leo Awards	July 6, 2022	Best Art Direction Animation Program	Renee Chio O'Shea	Nominated	
Leo Awards	July 6, 2022	Best Sound Animation Program	Gregorio Gomez, Greg Stewart, Angelo Nicoloyannis, John Franco, Ian Mackie, Rick Senechal, Sean Szutka	Nominated	
Leo Awards	July 6, 2022	Best Character Animation Program	Justin Smith-Fischer	Won	
Young Artist Awards	October 2, 2022	Best Performance in a Voice Acting Role: Youth Actor	Wyatt White	Won	
