= He's a Bully, Charlie Brown =

2006 animated television special

- Title card
- Genre: Animated television special
- Created by: Charles M. Schulz
- Written by: Charles M. Schulz; Justine Fontes
- Directed by: Bill Melendez; Larry Leichliter
- Voices of: Spencer Robert Scott; Stephanie Patton; Taylor Lautner; Rory Thost; Jessica Gordon; Jimmy Bennett; Benjamin Bryan; Katie Fischer; Sierra Marcoux; Jolean Wejbe; Paul Butcher, Jr.; Bill Melendez
- Theme music composer: Vince Guaraldi
- Opening theme: "Linus and Lucy"
- Ending theme: "Linus and Lucy"
- Composers: Vince Guaraldi; David Benoit
- Country of origin: United States
- Original language: English

Production
- Executive producers: Charles M. Schulz; Sander Schwartz
- Editors: Janet Leimenstoll; Jacob H. Trmrian
- Running time: 21 minutes
- Production companies: Mendelson/Melendez Productions; United Media

Original release
- Network: ABC
- Release: November 20, 2006

Related
- I Want a Dog for Christmas, Charlie Brown (2003); Happiness Is a Warm Blanket, Charlie Brown (2011)

He's a Bully, Charlie Brown is the 44th prime-time animated television special based on the comic strip Peanuts by Charles M. Schulz. It was originally aired on the ABC network on November 20, 2006. The special is primarily based on a story from the Peanuts comic strips originally appearing in April 1995. He's a Bully, Charlie Brown was an idea Schulz had pitched, and worked on before his death on February 12, 2000. Schulz's working title for the special was It's Only Marbles, Charlie Brown. Animation was produced by Toon-Us-In.

It is the final special to be produced by and feature Bill Melendez as the voice of Snoopy and Woodstock, as he died on September 2, 2008 and is also the final special to be co-produced by Lee Mendelson before his death of lung cancer on December 25, 2019. It was also the final new special to air on ABC as the next special Happiness Is a Warm Blanket, Charlie Brown aired on Fox. This is also the final Peanuts special from the 2000s, and the final special to be in standard definition as well as the final special to be produced by United Media before the company was shut down in 2011.

== Plot ==
As summer approaches, Charlie Brown prepares for camp with Snoopy, Linus, Marcie, and other children, while Peppermint Patty stays behind to attend summer school, much to her dismay. Before camp, Rerun van Pelt discovers a jar of marbles once owned by his grandfather and decides to bring them to camp to learn the game. At camp, the children encounter Joe Agate, who begins bullying them.

Joe tricks Rerun into a game of marbles under the guise of teaching him, then wins all his marbles by falsely claiming the game was for keeps. Rerun, upset, tells Charlie Brown, who isolates himself to practice marbles under Snoopy's tutelage. Meanwhile, back home, Peppermint Patty grows jealous, believing Marcie has a romantic interest in Charlie Brown. She arrives at camp but learns Charlie Brown has been absent, training to confront Joe.

On the final day of camp, Charlie Brown challenges Joe at the trading post. He exposes Joe's unfair tactics of preying on beginners and falsely claiming games are for keeps. In an intense match, Joe initially wins but is forced to restart after Snoopy provides Charlie Brown with spare marbles. Charlie Brown eventually defeats Joe, winning all the marbles, including Joe's prized shooter. Charlie Brown announces he will return the marbles to their rightful owners, including Rerun. Joe concedes defeat and leaves. Marcie celebrates by kissing Charlie Brown on the cheek, sparking Peppermint Patty's jealousy.

Back home, Peppermint Patty questions Marcie about camp. Marcie teasingly mentions a "Moonlight Walk" with Charlie Brown but reveals he walked into a tree while Snoopy and Woodstock enjoy campfire activities relaxing by their tents.

== Voice cast ==
- Spencer Robert Scott as Charlie Brown
- Stephanie Patton as Lucy van Pelt
- Taylor Lautner as Joe Agate, the bully
- Rory Thost as Peppermint Patty
- Jessica D. Stone as Marcie
- Jimmy Bennett as Rerun van Pelt
- Sierra Marcoux/Katie Fischer as Sally
- Benjamin Bryan as Linus van Pelt
- Bill Melendez as Snoopy, Woodstock
- Jolean Wejbe as Violet
- Paul Butcher as Roy

Patty, Frieda, Schroeder, and Pig-Pen also appear in this special, but do not speak.

== Production notes ==
The storyline He's a Bully, Charlie Brown was an amalgamation of several different series of Peanuts strips; the "Joe Agate" storyline originally appeared in the strip in 1995, and the story involving Peppermint Patty sneaking away from summer school to see Charlie Brown at camp was an adaptation of a series of strips from 1989.

This was the first and only Peanuts special to use CGI for one sequence, when the school bus pulled up to the camp.

=== Music score ===
As with all Peanuts specials starting with It's Christmastime Again, Charlie Brown, jazz pianist David Benoit performed and arranged the music score consisting of variations of songs originally performed by jazz pianist Vince Guaraldi. Guaraldi composed music scores for the first fifteen Peanuts television specials and one feature film (A Boy Named Charlie Brown) before his death in February 1976. This was the final Peanuts special to be scored by Benoit and include Guaraldi's music.

All songs written by Vince Guaraldi, except where noted.

1. "Linus and Lucy"
2. "Air Music" (aka "Surfin' Snoopy")
3. "Happiness Is"
4. "Peppermint Patty"
5. "Linus and Lucy" (reprise)
6. "The Masked Marvel"
7. "Oh, Good Grief" (Vince Guaraldi, Lee Mendelson)
8. "The Masked Marvel" (reprise)
9. "Happiness Is" (reprise)
10. "You're in Love, Charlie Brown"
11. "Pebble Beach"
12. "The Masked Marvel" (second reprise)
13. Medley: "The Masked Marvel"/"Linus and Lucy"
14. "Happiness Is" (second reprise)
15. "Linus and Lucy" (second reprise)
16. "Oh, Good Grief" (reprise) (Vince Guaraldi, Lee Mendelson)
17. "Linus and Lucy" (third reprise, end credits)

== Reception ==
This special aired on ABC on November 20, 2006, following a repeat broadcast of 1973's A Charlie Brown Thanksgiving. The show won their time slot with 9.4 million viewers, beating out a Madonna special on NBC.

== Home media ==
The special released on DVD as a bonus special in the remastered deluxe edition of You're Not Elected, Charlie Brown on October 7, 2008, by Warner Home Video. On October 6, 2015, Warner Home Video released the special on its own DVD with It Was a Short Summer, Charlie Brown and an episode from The Charlie Brown and Snoopy Show as bonus specials. The special began streaming on September 9, 2022, on Apple TV+ as part of The Peanuts Classics Collection.

On October 7, 2025, it was re-released on the DVD and Blu-Ray collection Peanuts: 75th Anniversary Ultimate TV Specials Collection along with 39 other Peanuts specials.
