= Happiness Is a Warm Blanket, Charlie Brown =

2011 Peanuts special

- Genre: Animation
- Based on: Peanuts by Charles M. Schulz
- Written by: Stephan Pastis; Craig Schulz
- Directed by: Andy Beall; Frank Molieri
- Voices of: Austin Lux; Amanda Pace; Trenton Rogers; Grace Rolek; Shane Baumel; Blesst Bowden; Ciara Bravo; Andy Pessoa; Andy Beall
- Music by: Mark Mothersbaugh
- Country of origin: United States
- Original language: English

Production
- Executive producers: Craig Schulz; Stephan Pastis; Paige Braddock; Linda M. Steiner
- Producer: Margaret M. Dean
- Animator: Yearim Productions Co., Ltd.
- Editor: Mike Mangan
- Running time: 45 minutes
- Production companies: Warner Premiere; Peanuts Worldwide; Warner Bros. Animation; Wildbrain Entertainment; Schulz Productions

Original release
- Network: Teletoon
- Release: October 1, 2011

Related
- He's a Bully, Charlie Brown (2006); The Peanuts Movie (2015) Snoopy Presents: For Auld Lang Syne (2021)

Happiness Is a Warm Blanket, Charlie Brown is the 45th Peanuts animated television special, released in 2011. It was the final network TV special based on the comic strip, before the franchise moved to Apple TV+ in 2020. The special is the first one produced without Lee Mendelson or Bill Melendez on the production team, following Melendez's death in 2008. It is also the first special without the direct involvement of Peanuts creator Charles M. Schulz, Lee Mendelson Productions or Bill Melendez Productions. In addition, it is the first Peanuts special produced by Warner Bros. Animation and Wildbrain Entertainment in part under Warner Bros. Television, which holds the home media distribution rights to the Peanuts specials, and the first to be produced in high-definition.

The special was released on DVD on March 29, 2011, and first aired on television on October 1, 2011, on Teletoon in Canada. The special premiered in the United States on Thanksgiving Day, November 24, 2011, at 8:30PM ET/PT on Fox, the first Peanuts special to air on the network; with this airing, Peanuts specials have aired on all four major networks. The first half of the film's original Fox broadcast in 2011 competed directly with a Peanuts special that aired at the same time on ABC ("The Mayflower Voyagers" from This Is America, Charlie Brown). The special aired again on November 23, 2012 (the day after Thanksgiving, so as not to directly compete with the other Peanuts specials) and December 20, 2013.

The program special is particularly notable in that the characters/animation are drawn in a 1950s/early-1960s style, and it uses only characters from that time period (including Violet, Shermy, and Patty), except for the inclusion of one later character, Woodstock, and intermediate-era characters Frieda, Faron, 5, 4, and 3 appearing briefly as extras; and even pays homage to the first Peanuts strip, from October 2, 1950 (when Charlie Brown has a flashback sequence).

The title recalls the 1960s Peanuts phrase "Happiness Is a Warm Puppy," which became a cultural reference.

== Plot ==
Linus Van Pelt is criticized by the other kids, except Charlie Brown, for always having his blanket with him, but Linus ignores them, loving it no matter what and insisting on never outgrowing it. Snoopy agrees with this and tries to take it for himself, but fails. One day, Lucy Van Pelt informs Linus that their grandmother is coming in a week, and if Linus doesn't get rid of his blanket, it will be cut up into pieces by their grandmother.

Charlie Brown suggests that Linus find a substitute for the blanket, which though only works to some extent. Lucy tries various attempts to make Linus let go of his blanket, such as locking it in the closet for the day, turning it into a kite and letting go of the string, causing it to fly away and get lost before it is eventually found, and burying it outside, but all the attempts fail, and Linus is still obsessed with it.

Throughout the special, the other characters also have various problems of their own: "Pig-Pen" is also criticized by Patty and Violet for being dirty, and Lucy constantly fails to get Schroeder's attention. Days later, Snoopy drags Linus and his blanket across the neighborhood, which all the children follow as they get affected in their path. After all the other children, except Charlie Brown, criticize Linus to his limit, he finally snaps and delivers a monologue about how everyone needs some kind of security, while pointing out their own securities that are like his blanket (Sally Brown's being "Sweet Baboo"s, Schroeder's being Beethoven, Lucy's being Schroeder, and Snoopy's being suppertime, "24 hours a day"). Later, Grandma Van Pelt arrives, and Linus gives her a washcloth as a decoy of his blanket. Linus tries to get his blanket back after Snoopy steals it, shouting "AUGH!"

== Voices ==
- Austin Lux as Linus van Pelt
- Amanda Pace as Sally Brown
- Trenton Rogers as Charlie Brown/Schroeder
- Grace Rolek as Lucy van Pelt
- Shane Baumel as "Pig-Pen"
- Blesst Bowden as Violet Gray
- Ciara Bravo as Patty
- Andy Pessoa as Shermy
- Andy Beall as Snoopy

Frieda, Faron, 5, 3, and 4 have cameo appearances but are silent.

== Production ==
The film was announced on the NBC broadcast of the 84th annual Macy's Thanksgiving Day Parade when a Snoopy balloon (in his flying ace outfit) passed by. One of the hosts of the broadcast, Meredith Vieira announced the film by saying "Snoopy fans will be happy to know that next year, a new Peanuts animation will be flying your way."

The last Peanuts special had been in 2006. Craig Schulz, son of the strip's creator, said the intention was to use 1960s style animation. Yearim Productions in South Korea animated the film. Schulz also said the majority of the script used the actual strips, supplemented by work by Pearls Before Swine creator Stephan Pastis. Pastis had the idea to focus on Linus' blanket.

After the death of Bill Melendez, the voices of Snoopy and Woodstock were provided by director Andrew Beall, however, in later Peanuts animated productions, some recordings of Melendez were used.

The film was scored by Devo frontman Mark Mothersbaugh.

One of the voice actors that appeared on the special is Shermy's voice actor, Andy Pessoa, who was at the time voicing Rafael "Raf" Esquivel on Transformers: Prime.

== Home media ==
Happiness Is a Warm Blanket, Charlie Brown was released on Blu-ray and DVD March 29, 2011 by Warner Home Video and includes the following special features:

- Deconstructing Schulz: From Comic Strip to Screenplay
- Happiness Is...Finding the Right Voice
- 24 Frames a Second: Drawing and Animating a Peanuts Movie
- Deleted Scene featuring an introduction by director Andy Beall

On October 7, 2025, it was re-released on the DVD and Blu-Ray collection Peanuts: 75th Anniversary Ultimate TV Specials Collection along with 39 other Peanuts specials.
