= I Want a Dog for Christmas, Charlie Brown =

2003 Peanuts television special

- Genre: Animated TV special
- Created by: Charles M. Schulz
- Directed by: Bill Melendez; Larry Leichliter
- Voices of: Jimmy Bennett; Adam Taylor Gordon; Ashley Rose Orr; Corey Padnos; Hannah Leigh Dworkin; Nick Price; Jake Miner; Kailtyn Maggio; Bill Melendez
- Theme music composer: Vince Guaraldi
- Opening theme: "Linus and Lucy"
- Ending theme: "Re-Run's Theme"
- Composer: David Benoit
- Country of origin: United States
- Original language: English

Production
- Executive producer: Lee Mendelson
- Producer: Bill Melendez
- Running time: 45 minutes
- Production companies: United Media; Mendelson-Melendez

Original release
- Network: ABC
- Release: December 9, 2003

Related
- Lucy Must Be Traded, Charlie Brown (2003); He's a Bully, Charlie Brown (2006)

I Want a Dog for Christmas, Charlie Brown is the 43rd prime-time animated television special based upon the comic strip Peanuts by Charles M. Schulz. The special first aired on ABC on December 9, 2003 (A Veteran’s Day Salute). The special is about Linus and Lucy's younger brother, Rerun, wanting a pet dog for Christmas.

== Plot ==
After unfair treatment by his older siblings Linus and Lucy and getting in trouble at school, Rerun thinks that having a pet dog will cheer him up. He writes a letter to Santa Claus asking for a dog, but is later discouraged by the expensive costs of owning a pet and his mother's objections. Watching Snoopy dance to Schroeder's music, Rerun asks Charlie Brown if Snoopy has any siblings, and Charlie Brown shows him pictures of Snoopy's brothers and sisters. Rerun asks Charlie Brown if he can play with Snoopy sometime.

Rerun has fun playing with Snoopy, but in the following days, Snoopy is busy and refuses to play. Rerun again searches for a dog, and Lucy argues that Rerun would not know how to take care of a dog if he got one. Rerun learns by watching Snoopy, who gets a letter from his brother Spike, who lives in the desert. Rerun wants Spike as a pet and has Snoopy write him a letter.

After Spike visits, Rerun has fun with him, but his mother, though she comments Rerun has done a good job caring for him, does not allow Spike to stay only because he looked so bad upon his arrival that she feels bad for him. Charlie Brown tries to get Spike re-adopted, but fails and has to send him back to the desert. Noticing that Rerun is upset over Spike leaving, Lucy signs him up for a Christmas play, in which he forgets his line. Rerun then asks to play with Snoopy, who wants to be pulled on a sled; Rerun comments, "Maybe a dog is too much trouble."

== Voice cast ==
- Jimmy Bennett as Rerun van Pelt
- Ashley Rose Orr as Lucy van Pelt
- Corey Padnos as Linus van Pelt
- Adam Taylor Gordon as Charlie Brown
- Hannah Leigh Dworkin as Sally Brown
- Nick Price as Schroeder
- Jake Miner as Franklin, Pig-Pen
- Kaitlyn Maggio as Little Pigtailed Girl, Violet
- Bill Melendez as Snoopy, Spike, Woodstock

Shermy, Patty and Eudora also appear, but they are silent.

== Production notes ==
This special is the second time Snoopy's brothers Marbles, Olaf, and Andy appear in a Peanuts special, the first being 1991's Snoopy's Reunion. His sister Belle is also mentioned, but not seen.

The scene in which Lucy fattens Spike up was previously used in the "Snoopy's Brother Spike" episode of The Charlie Brown and Snoopy Show, with several lines being near-identical to the original episode.

== Reception ==
I Want a Dog for Christmas, Charlie Brown drew 10.2 million viewers on the night it premiered in 2003, losing the evening's ratings battle to a reairing of Rudolph the Red-Nosed Reindeer, which topped that night with 13.7 million viewers on CBS.

Anita Gates of The New York Times gave mixed opinions, who wrote that the special "feels like a hodgepodge of four-frame strips strung together in an unsuccessful attempt to create a unified story," understanding that Bill Melendez and Lee Mendelson had made a commitment to create new specials working from material only from the strip. She wrote that the "one-two-three-punch-line" structure of the strips poorly translated into animation, but otherwise felt the special kept "the bittersweet charm" of Charles Schulz's work.

== Soundtrack ==
The music score for I Want a Dog for Christmas, Charlie Brown is a mix of classic Peanuts melodies composed by Vince Guaraldi and new themes composed by David Benoit. All songs composed by Guaraldi (except where noted) and performed and arranged by Benoit.

1. "Re-Run's Theme / Linus and Lucy" (David Benoit / Vince Guaraldi)
2. "Re-Run's Theme" (David Benoit)
3. "Linus and Lucy" (opening)
4. "Oh, Good Grief" (Vince Guaraldi, Lee Mendelson)
5. "Pebble Beach"
6. "Spike's Theme" (slow) (David Benoit)
7. "Re-Run's Theme" (David Benoit)
8. "Christmas Time Is Here"
9. "Skating"
10. "Re-Run's Theme" (David Benoit)
11. "Piano Sonata No. 8"
12. "Christmas Is Coming"
13. "Red Baron" (alternate)
14. "Re-Run's Theme" (slow) (David Benoit)
15. "Re-Run's Theme" (David Benoit)
16. "Charlie Brown Theme"
17. "Re-Run's Theme" (slow) (David Benoit)
18. "Piano Sonata No. 23" Ludwig van Beethoven
19. "Christmas Time Is Here"
20. "Re-Run's Theme" (with "Jingle Bells") (David Benoit, James Lord Pierpont)
21. "Oh, Good Grief" (Vince Guaraldi, Lee Mendelson)
22. "Red Baron" (alternate)
23. "Spike's Theme" (David Benoit)
24. "Piano Sonata No. 18"
25. "Re-Run's Theme" (David Benoit)
26. "Spike's Theme" (David Benoit)
27. "Linus and Lucy"
28. "Re-Run's Theme" (David Benoit)
29. "Blue Charlie Brown"
30. "Spike's Theme" (David Benoit)
31. "Christmas Time Is Here"
32. "Re-Run's Theme" (David Benoit)
33. "Re-Run's Theme" (closing) (David Benoit)

No official soundtrack for I Want a Dog for Christmas, Charlie Brown was released. However, a version of "Re-Run's Theme" was commercially released by Benoit on Jazz For Peanuts: A Retrospective Of The Charlie Brown Television Themes (2008).

== Home media ==
It was released to DVD and VHS by Paramount on October 26, 2004, and Warner Home Video released it as a remastered deluxe edition on DVD on October 6, 2009, which also included Happy New Year, Charlie Brown! as a bonus feature. This special was re-released as part of the box set Snoopy's Holiday Collection on October 1, 2013. The special continued to air on ABC until 2019. As of 2020, the special will be among the collection of Peanuts productions available only to Apple TV+ subscribers; it was released on that platform on December 2, 2022.

On October 7, 2025, it was re-released on the DVD and Blu-Ray collection Peanuts: 75th Anniversary Ultimate TV Specials Collection along with 39 other Peanuts specials.
