= Snoopy in Space =

Web television series

- Based on: Peanuts by Charles M. Schulz
- Developed by: Mark Evestaff; Betsy Walters
- Composer: Jeff Morrow
- Countries of origin: Canada; United States
- Original language: English
- No. of seasons: 2
- No. of episodes: 24

Production
- Executive producers: Josh Scherba; Anne Loi; Stephanie Betts; Paige Braddock; Craig Schulz; Mark Evestaff
- Producer: Kimberly Small
- Running time: 8 minutes
- Production companies: WildBrain Studios (Note: Known as DHX Studios Vancouver for the first season); Peanuts Worldwide; Schulz Studio

Original release
- Network: Apple TV+
- Release: November 1, 2019 – November 12, 2021

Snoopy in Space is an animated television series inspired by the Peanuts comic strip by Charles M. Schulz. Developed by Mark Evestaff and Betsy Walters, and produced by WildBrain Studios, the show debuted on November 1, 2019 on Apple TV+.

There are two main plots over each of the seasons. In the first season, Snoopy becomes a NASA astronaut, taking trips to the ISS and the moon and braving the dark void of space, with Charlie Brown, Linus, Marcie, Franklin, Peppermint Patty, Sally, Rerun, and Lucy at mission control. In the second season, Snoopy and the others return to Houston to search for signs of life on other planets.

== Cast and characters ==
- Terry McGurrin as Snoopy
- Robert Tinkler as Woodstock
- Ethan Pugiotto (season 1) and Tyler Nathan (season 2) as Charlie Brown
- Hattie Kragten as Sally Brown
- Christian Dal Dosso as Franklin
- Isabella Leo as Lucy van Pelt
- Wyatt White as Linus van Pelt
- Holly Gorski as Marcie
- Isis Moore as Peppermint Patty
- Milo Toriel-McGibbon as Rerun van Pelt
- Nicole Byer as C.A.R.A.
- Julie Lemieux, Seán Cullen, and David Berni as Bird Buds

== Episodes ==
=== Series overview ===
Season	Episodes	Originally released
1	12	November 1, 2019
2	12	November 12, 2021

=== Season 1 (2019) ===
No. overall	No. in season	Title	Directed by	Written by	Original release date
1	1	"Mission 1: The Application"	Rob Boutilier	Betsy Walters	November 1, 2019
Inspired by the neighborhood kids, Snoopy sets out to become a NASA astronaut.
2	2	"Mission 2: Training"	Behzad Mansoori-Dara	Betsy Walters	November 1, 2019
Snoopy meets C.A.R.A (NASA's Computerized Astronaut Recruitment Advisor).
3	3	"Mission 3: The Graduation"	Ridd Sorensen	Betsy Walters	November 1, 2019
After his true identity is revealed, Snoopy must prove his worth to NASA.
4	4	"Mission 4: Welcome to the ISS"	Rob Boutilier	Carly DeNure	November 1, 2019
Snoopy blasts off for the ISS and is surprised to see a familiar face on board.
5	5	"Mission 5: I Never Promised You a Space Garden"	Behzad Mansoori-Dara	Mark Edwards	November 1, 2019
Snoopy and Woodstock struggle to tend to the ISS garden.
6	6	"Mission 6: Space Sleepwalking"	Ridd Sorensen	Miles Smith	November 1, 2019
A peaceful night on the ISS is interrupted when Snoopy realizes Woodstock's missing.
7	7	"Mission 7: The Journey on Orion"	Rob Boutilier	Mark Edwards	November 1, 2019
Snoopy returns to Earth and earns a chance for a bigger mission: a trip to the Moon!
8	8	"Mission 8: Crater Crash"	Behzad Mansoori-Dara	Carly DeNure	November 1, 2019
Snoopy and Woodstock's fun antics lead to peril while measuring Moon craters.
9	9	"Mission 9: Searching for Moon Rocks"	Ridd Sorensen	Miles Smith	November 1, 2019
After getting lost, Woodstock gets an idea while he and Snoopy collect rocks.
10	10	"Mission 10: You're a Good Moon, Charlie Brown"	Rob Boutilier	Betsy Walters	November 1, 2019
Snoopy and Woodstock return from the Moon-----and leave behind a surprise.
11	11	"Mission 11: The Next Mission"	Behzad Mansoori-Dara	Betsy Walters	November 1, 2019
As Snoopy completes his mission report, he dreams about his next adventure.
12	12	"Mission 12: Mars or Bust"	Ridd Sorensen	Betsy Walters	November 1, 2019
Charlie Brown plots to help Snoopy with his dreams of traveling to Mars.

=== Season 2 (2021) ===
No. overall	No. in season	Title	Directed by	Written by	Original release date
13	1	"Mission 13: The Search Begins"	Ridd Sorensen	Betsy Walters	November 12, 2021
14	2	"Mission 14: A New Mission"	Behzad Mansoori-Dara	Scott Montgomery	November 12, 2021
15	3	"Mission 15: Robots"	Steve Evangelatos	Carly DeNure	November 12, 2021
16	4	"Mission 16: Mars"	Ridd Sorensen	Betsy Walters	November 12, 2021
17	5	"Mission 17: Europa"	Behzad Mansoori-Dara	Joselyn Geddie	November 12, 2021
18	6	"Mission 18: Venus"	Steve Evangelatos	Scott Montgomery	November 12, 2021
19	7	"Mission 19: Hera"	Ridd Sorensen	Carly DeNure	November 12, 2021
20	8	"Mission 20: Exoplanets"	Behzad Mansoori-Dara	Scott Montgomery	November 12, 2021
21	9	"Mission 21: The Discovery"	Steve Evangelatos	Betsy Walters	November 12, 2021
22	10	"Mission 22: Operation Asteroid"	Ridd Sorensen	Jocelyn Geddie	November 12, 2021
23	11	"Mission 23: The Big Picture"	Behzad Mansoori-Dara	Betsy Walters	November 12, 2021
24	12	"Mission 24: A New Voyage"	Steve Evangelatos	Scott Montgomery	November 12, 2021

== Production ==
In December 2018, DHX Media announced that it would be producing new Peanuts material for Apple's then-unnamed streaming service, starting with the animated Snoopy in Space. Months prior, Peanuts Worldwide announced a partnership with NASA to promote STEM to students through new content.

The Snoopy character had a history with the space agency dating back to the 1969 Apollo 10 mission. In the buildup to the show's release, Apple TV began streaming a documentary by Morgan Neville titled Peanuts in Space: Secrets of Apollo 10. Starring Ron Howard and Jeff Goldblum, the short was released in May 2019. Through the NASA partnership, the series uses live-action footage from the NASA archives.

Snoopy in Space debuted alongside the launch of Apple TV+ on November 1, 2019. DHX released the show's soundtrack to stream on Apple Music the same day.

The show was the last DHX show to be produced under the DHX Media name, before the studio would change its name to WildBrain to build upon its multi-channel network of the same name, which was subsequently renamed to "WildBrain Spark".

In October 2020, it was announced that a second season was in production. The second season premiered on November 12, 2021.

== Promotion ==
A teaser for the series was released on July 17, 2019. The full trailer was released on September 27, 2019.

As part of the general NASA partnership with Peanuts Worldwide, McDonald's Happy Meals featured space-themed Snoopy toys and books over the summer of 2019. An astronaut Snoopy character balloon also flew in the 2019 Macy's Thanksgiving Day Parade. Space Foundation began hosting STEM lessons prior to the show's release. Apple Store locations launched Snoopy in Space-themed events alongside the series' debut.

== Reception ==
On review aggregator Rotten Tomatoes, Snoopy in Space holds an approval rating of 100% based on 6 reviews, with an average score 8/10. In a positive review for Common Sense Media, Mandie Caroll praised the show's handling of the educational aspects, though she warned that older fans might miss the "gloomy" situations of traditional Peanuts stories. Decider's Joel Keller felt that the deeper aspects of Peanuts were missing, but still recommended the series to fans of Snoopy and space exploration. iMore's Lory Gil also noticed the lack of bite compared to earlier Peanuts specials, though she felt it still offered a good update for modern audiences.

=== Accolades ===
Year	Award	Category	Nominee(s)	Result	Ref.
2020	Annie Award	Outstanding Achievement for Storyboarding in an Animated Television / Broadcast Production	Riccardo Durante	Nominated	
2020	Daytime Emmys Award	Outstanding Short Format Children's Program	Snoopy in Space	Nominated	
2021	Canadian Screen Awards	Animated Program or Series	Snoopy in Space	Nominated	
2021	Canadian Screen Awards	Sound in an Animated Program or Series	Jeff Davis, Fanny Riguidel, Stefan Seslija and Melanie Eng ("Mission 6: Space Sleepwalking")	Nominated	
