= Happy New Year, Charlie Brown! =

1986 television special

- Genre: Animation
- Created by: Charles M. Schulz
- Written by: Charles M. Schulz
- Directed by: Bill Melendez; Sam Jaimes
- Voices of: Chad Allen; Jeremy Miller; Melissa Guzzi; Elizabeth Lyn Fraser; Aron Mandelbaum; Jason Muller; Kristie Baker; Bill Melendez
- Music by: Ed Bogas; Desirée Goyette
- Country of origin: United States
- Original language: English

Production
- Executive producers: Lee Mendelson; Charles M. Schulz
- Producer: Bill Melendez
- Camera setup: Nick Vasu
- Running time: 24 minutes
- Production companies: United Media Productions; Bill Melendez Productions; Lee Mendelson Film Productions

Original release
- Network: CBS
- Release: January 1, 1986

Related
- You're a Good Man, Charlie Brown (1985); Snoopy! The Musical (1988); Snoopy Presents: For Auld Lang Syne (2021)

Happy New Year, Charlie Brown! is the 30th prime-time animated television special based upon the comic strip Peanuts, by Charles M. Schulz. It aired on the CBS network on January 1, 1986, at 8:30 p.m. The special focuses on Charlie Brown's difficulty finishing a book report over the holidays. The special is dedicated to longtime Peanuts animator Bernard Gruver, following his death on June 14, 1985. Another New Year's special, Snoopy Presents: For Auld Lang Syne, was released on Apple TV+ on December 10, 2021.

== Plot ==
While all the kids are happy that they get time off for Christmas break, Charlie Brown dreads how his teacher at the last minute assigned a book report on War and Peace by Leo Tolstoy. There is one major distraction on his mind; the big New Year's party all his friends are attending, with Peppermint Patty continuously urging him to attend. When Charlie Brown tries inviting the Little Red-Haired Girl, his hand is caught in the mail slot.

With the party on his mind, he attempts to try to find another way to write the report, even going to a bookstore to find an audiobook and computer game of it, all to no avail. While at the party, he tries to finish the book on the front porch of the house, but falls asleep and misses the clock's striking of midnight. He is further devastated upon learning Linus ended up dancing with the Little Red-Haired Girl, who showed up after all.

At the end of the special, Charlie Brown finishes War and Peace and hands his book report to the teacher. He gets a D−, the lowest grade without failing. Despite the poor grade, Charlie Brown is proud that he made an honest effort and avoided an outright failure. However, the teacher announces that the entire class will be made to read and report on Fyodor Dostoevsky's Crime and Punishment, overwhelming him even more.

== Cast ==
- Chad Allen as Charlie Brown
- Jeremy Miller as Linus van Pelt
- Melissa Guzzi as Lucy van Pelt
- Kristie Baker as Peppermint Patty
- Elizabeth Lyn Fraser as Sally Brown
- Aron Mandelbaum as Schroeder
- Jason Muller as Marcie
- Bill Melendez as Snoopy, Woodstock
- Desirée Goyette as singer ("Slow Slow Quick Quick")

== Ratings ==
Happy New Year, Charlie Brown ranked No. 20 in the Nielsen ratings during the week it premiered. Its competition included the Orange Bowl, which ranked No. 14.

== Home media ==
The special was released on VHS by Kartes Video Communications in 1987 and by Paramount Home Video re-released on September 28, 1994. Paramount would re-release the VHS in clamshell packaging on October 1, 1996. Warner Home Video re-released the special on DVD on October 6, 2009 as a bonus feature for the Remastered Deluxe Edition of I Want a Dog for Christmas, Charlie Brown.

It was re-released as part of the box set Snoopy's Holiday Collection on October 1, 2013.

On October 7, 2025, it was re-released on the DVD and Blu-Ray collection Peanuts: 75th Anniversary Ultimate TV Specials Collection along with 39 other Peanuts specials.
