= Andy Pessoa =

American actor (born 1995)

- Born: October 30, 1995 (age 30); Kearney, Nebraska, U.S.
- Occupations: Actor, voice actor
- Years active: 2005–present

Andrew Stephan Pessoa (born October 30, 1995) is an American actor. His first leading role was in the 2006 independent short film Fishy, which was directed by Laurie Epstein. Other projects include Adventures in Odyssey, Transformers: Prime, and Bucket & Skinner's Epic Adventures.

== Background ==
Andy Pessoa was born in Kearney, Nebraska, as fourth son to David and Stephanie Pessoa. He has three brothers: Samuel, Joshua (1990-2008), and Jeremy. He currently resides in Los Angeles, California. Besides Los Angeles, cities in which Andy has lived include: Norton, Kansas; Bloomington, Minnesota; Cannon Falls, Minnesota; Arlington, Texas, and Los Alamitos, California. Andy relocated to California and began acting in early 2005.

== Filmography ==
=== Film ===
Year	Title	Role	Notes
2006	Fishy	Billy	Short film
2007	If I Had Known I Was a Genius	Gifted Kid #2	
2007	Let's Play	Jimmy	Short film
2008	Wish	Noah	Short film
2008	Lower Learning	Walter	
2009	Nine	Italian Boy	Voice
2011	Happiness Is A Warm Blanket, Charlie Brown	Shermy	Voice
2012	The Amazing Spider-Man	Gordon	

=== Television ===
Year	Title	Role	Notes
2006	It's Always Sunny in Philadelphia	Duck's team kid	Episode: "The Gang Gives Back"
2006	Hannah Montana	Young Oliver Oken	2 episodes
2006	Two and a Half Men	Andy	Episode: "Apologies for the Frivolity"
2006	Medium	Ian Bankova	Episode: "Four Dreams"
2007	Scrubs	Bobby	Episode: "My Friend With Money"
2008	My Name Is Earl	Young Kenny	4 episodes
2008	Wizards of Waverly Place	Alfred	2 episodes
2009	Chuck	Young Morgan Grimes	Episode: "Chuck Versus the Best Friend"
2009	Zeke and Luther	Garrett "Stinky Cast" Delfino	6 episodes
2010	Sym-Bionic Titan	Gabriel	Voice, episode: "Shadows of Youth"
2011	Transformers: Prime	Raf Esquivel	Voice
2011	Bucket & Skinner's Epic Adventures	A.V. Kid	2 episodes
2012	Key & Peele	Daniel Rosenberg	Episode: "Pilot"
2022–24	Monster High	Wailon	Voice

=== Radio ===
Year	Title	Role	Notes
2010	Adventures in Odyssey	Barrett Jones	9 episodes

=== Video games ===
Year	Title	Role	Notes
2012	The Lord of the Rings: Aragorn's Quest	Merry Gamgee	
2012	Transformers: Prime – The Game	Raf Esquivel	
2016	King's Quest	Gart	
