= Linus Maurer =

American cartoonist

- Born: January 15, 1926 Sleepy Eye, Minnesota, US
- Died: January 29, 2016 (aged 90) Sonoma, California, US
- Area: Cartoonist
- Notable works: Old Harrigan (1960s); Abracadabra (1970s); Namesake of Linus van Pelt

Linus Albert Maurer (January 15, 1926 – January 29, 2016) was an American cartoonist, illustrator and puzzle designer. He worked as the editorial cartoonist for the Sonoma Index-Tribune, a California newspaper, for more than 25 years. Maurer also authored and created several syndicated comic strips, including "Old Harrigan" during the 1960s and "Abracadabra" during the 1970s, which were published nationwide. Additionally, Maurer created and authored newspaper puzzles, including "Challenger," a number puzzle which was published by King Features Syndicate twenty times per month.

Linus Maurer was the namesake for the character Linus Van Pelt, in Charles M. Schulz's Peanuts comic strip. Maurer and Schulz had been classmates at Minneapolis College of Art and Design (MCAD) and remained lifelong friends. Both men also worked together at the Art Instruction Schools Inc. in Minneapolis while Schulz was creating Peanuts. Schulz would name Linus van Pelt, who is known for his blue security blanket in the Peanuts comic strip, after his friend and colleague. He would later write in a book marking the 50th anniversary of Peanuts, "Linus came from a drawing that I made one day of a face almost like the one he now has...I experimented with some wild hair, and showed the sketch to a friend of mine who sat near me at art instruction, whose name was Linus Maurer. It seemed appropriate that I should name the character Linus." Schulz and Maurer continued to meet for coffee at Snoopy's Home Ice skating rink in Santa Rosa, California, until Schulz died in 2000.

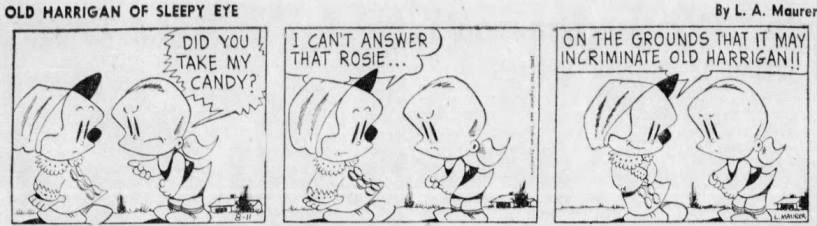
August 11, 1955 installment of Maurer's comic strip "Old Harrigan of Sleepy Eye"

Following MCAD, Maurer moved to New York City, where he worked as an illustrator for AT&T and IBM. In 1962, he relocated to San Francisco to accept a position as the art director with the McCann Erickson ad agency. He also worked as an art director at Wells Fargo in San Francisco as well. He eventually left the corporate world and opened his own office in the city's Ghirardelli Square. He created several comic strips during the 1960s and 1970s, including "Old Harrigan," "Abracadabra" and "In the Beginning."

Maurer moved from San Francisco to the Sonoma Valley following the death of his wife. He worked as an editorial cartoonist for more than 25 years in Sonoma.

Maurer suffered from heart disease and Parkinson's disease during his later years, but continued to draw until shortly before his death. He died in Sonoma, California, on January 29, 2016, at the age of 90. He was predeceased by his wife and survived by his partner of 26 years, Mary Jo Starsiak. Both Maurer and Starsiak were widowers when they first met in Sonoma, California.
