= Bert V. Royal =

American dramatist

- Born: Bert V. Royal Jr. October 14, 1977 (age 48); Aurora, Colorado, U.S.
- Occupations: Screenwriter, playwright, casting director
- Writing career
- Period: 2004–present
- Notable works: Dog Sees God: Confessions of a Teenage Blockhead (2005); Easy A (2010)

Bert V. Royal Jr. (born October 14, 1977) is an American screenwriter, playwright, and former casting director. He is best known as the writer of the play Dog Sees God: Confessions of a Teenage Blockhead, which premiered Off-Broadway in 2005, and the 2010 teen film Easy A.

== Early life ==
Royal grew up in Green Cove Springs, Florida. He did not attend high school, and instead was homeschooled. He later attended St. Johns River State College's Florida School of the Arts, where he majored in acting, but quit after two years because he felt he could not act.

== Career ==
Royal moved from Florida to New York City at the age of 21 after receiving an internship at the Public Theater. He first worked in casting, where he was involved in the casting of Third Watch and Chappelle's Show, but quit after five years to become a writer. His first successful script was for Dog Sees God: Confessions of a Teenage Blockhead, a play centering on the Peanuts comic strip characters as teenagers. Royal submitted the script to the 2004 New York International Fringe Festival and produced by Sorrel Tomlinson, where it won the award for Best Overall Production and was then picked up by producers Dede Harris and Tomlinson to become an Off-Broadway production, premiering in December 2005. Dog Sees God won the 2004 GLAAD Media Award for Best Off-Broadway Play and the 2006 HX Award for Best Off-Broadway Play, among other awards.

Following the 2007–2008 Writers Guild of America strike, Royal wrote the spec script for the high school comedy film Easy A. He sold the script to Screen Gems almost immediately and the film commenced principal photography nine months later. After Easy A was released in September 2010, Royal wrote a television pilot set in Jacksonville, Florida, which was picked up and shot by MTV. As of 2010, he is writing a television series for CBS Television Studios and an adaptation of the 2002 Japanese horror film 2LDK.

== Personal life ==
Royal is gay and has said that Brandon, a gay character in Easy A, was based on himself. He lives in the Los Angeles Toluca Lake neighborhood.
