= Bernard Gruver =

American cartoonist (1923–85)

- Born: June 25, 1923; Long Beach, California
- Died: June 14, 1985 (aged 61); Sherman Oaks, California

Bernard Gruver (June 25, 1923 – June 14, 1985) was best known as one of the original animators of the Peanuts cartoon series. He also was an animation professor at the University of Southern California School of Cinematic Arts. He died of pneumonia following treatment for leukemia in 1985. Happy New Year, Charlie Brown was dedicated to him.
