= Regina Company =

American manufacturer (established 1892 or 1894)

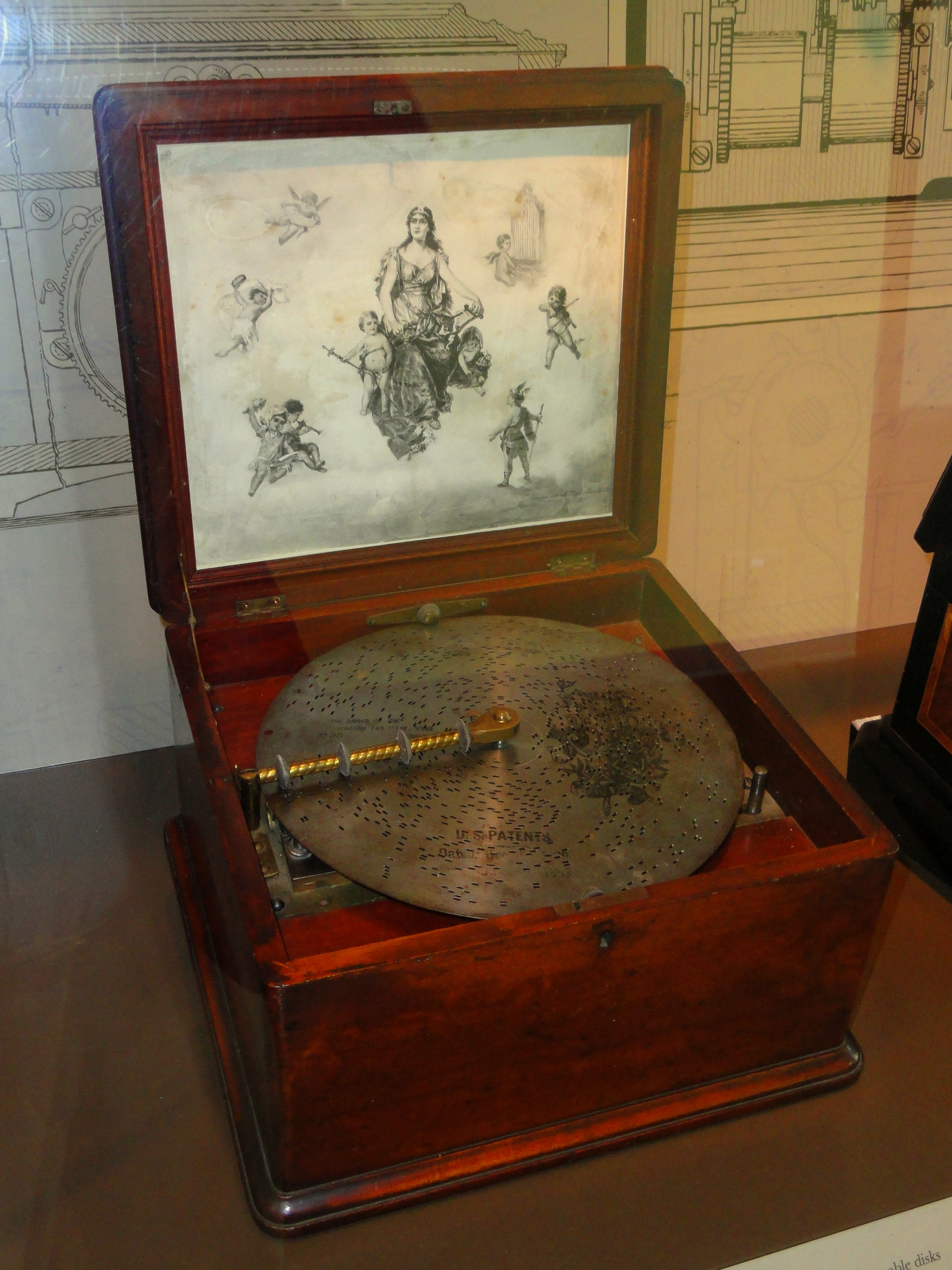
Regina Music Box (ca.1890)

The Regina Company was a manufacturer of mechanical musical instruments before it became a major vacuum maker.

== History ==
In 1889, Gustave Brachhausen, the foreman of the Symphonion music box company based in Leipzig, created the polyphon Musikwerke in partnership with a Symphonion engineer Paul Riessner. Three years later, at the age of 35, Brachhausen expanded his enterprise to America by establishing the Regina Music Box Company. After sailing to America in September 1892, he leased some space in Jersey City, and with financing from Knauth, Nachod & Kuhne in Leipzig, Brachhausen set up shop in partnership with Riessner and Johannas J. Korner.

Initially, Regina imported their boxes from Polyphon, selling 11 and 15.5-inch models. Gradually, the movements were imported and assembled into American-made boxes. After a year of immediate success, Brachhausen purchased a 25,000-square foot building at 54 Cherry Street in Rahway, New Jersey. In a few years, Regina was manufacturing their products entirely in America, as Brachhausen accumulated patents. Regina established a nationwide distribution network by offering a 50% wholesale price to department stores and other retailers. He also lured one of Symphonion's arrangers, Octave Felicien Chaillet, to America, where he composed and arranged thousands of discs for Regina. In 1897, Brachhausen patented an automatic disc changer, and Regina established a service for installing and maintaining their coin-operated music boxes.

Regina boxes were seen as strong profit drivers partially because they created a steady revenue stream, as consumers would buy new discs to play on boxes they had already purchased. For a machine that cost $500, this was a relatively novel idea. Regina shipped 100,000 music boxes between 1892 and 1921, with sales topping out over $2 million a year. The company had 325 employees, and even as Symphonion established an American branch, Regina thrived as the market leader. Competition from the phonograph jeopardized the company in the early years of the 20th century, and in 1902, it dropped "Music Box" from its name and started to diversify. Its first vacuum cleaner was a two-person hand-pumped pneumatic model which sold poorly. In 1903, Knauth and company overtook the company to protect its investment, relegating Brachhausen to factory manager. New products continued to flood the market from the Regina company, everything from player pianos to copying presses. Eventually, the company went bankrupt in 1922.

The company introduced canister vacuum models in 1928 and its Brush 'n' Beat upright in 1965. During World War II, the company made bomb fuses. In 1946, Regina's stick vacuum, the ElectrikBroom, made its debut; reaching its peak sales in the 1960s and 1970s and retaining profitability until production ceased in 1994. Options added during this time were the Pile Dial in 1963, 2-speeds in 1965, 3-speeds in 1970, and the Power Team brush roll model in 1982. Motor amps and the cord length also changed over the years. Sears offered its own private label version. Regina introduced its twin disc floor polisher & scrubber in 1950--which Sears branded for a time, as well. In late 1961 the hood styles were updated and a new machine was added to the line which added a 2-quart rug shampooing component; the single-speed versions were phased out and the 2-speed and 3-speed versions were added in 1966--allowing users to select levels for polishing/buffing/sanding, scrubbing and liquid waxing. A 90-ounce dispenser capacity option was availed in 1971 and a 120-ounce size in 1972. A semi-commercial version with a 3-wire cord was first produced in 1977. The styling would remain in production until 1984 when the Steemer-Power Scrubber/Carpet Cleaner was launched. Other notable vacuum cleaners by Regina were the Duo-Vac in 1974, a combination canister and upright; the Housekeeper upright in 1986; and the Ultra Housekeeper in 1993.

In the 1980s, CEO Donald D. Sheelen led a group of employees who purchased Regina for $38 Million in a leveraged buyout. Don Sheelen's inventions cross the vacuum sphere from the basic vacuum cleaner to the steam cleaner. During the 1990s, the Peanuts character Pig-Pen appeared in commercials. The “tools on board” idea, “cyclonic” vacuum technology, and the modern easy to use steam cleaner were all the brainchild of Don Sheelen. The Regina Company was eventually acquired by Philips Electronics in 1995. Oreck bought the company in 1997, and in 2000, it was sold to the Royal Corporation, the owners of the Dirt Devil brand, which sold the vacuums under the Home Depot brand for a few years. In 2020 Regina Vacuum LLC relaunched the Regina brand, offering a vacuum cleaner and air purifier.

== Major musical products ==
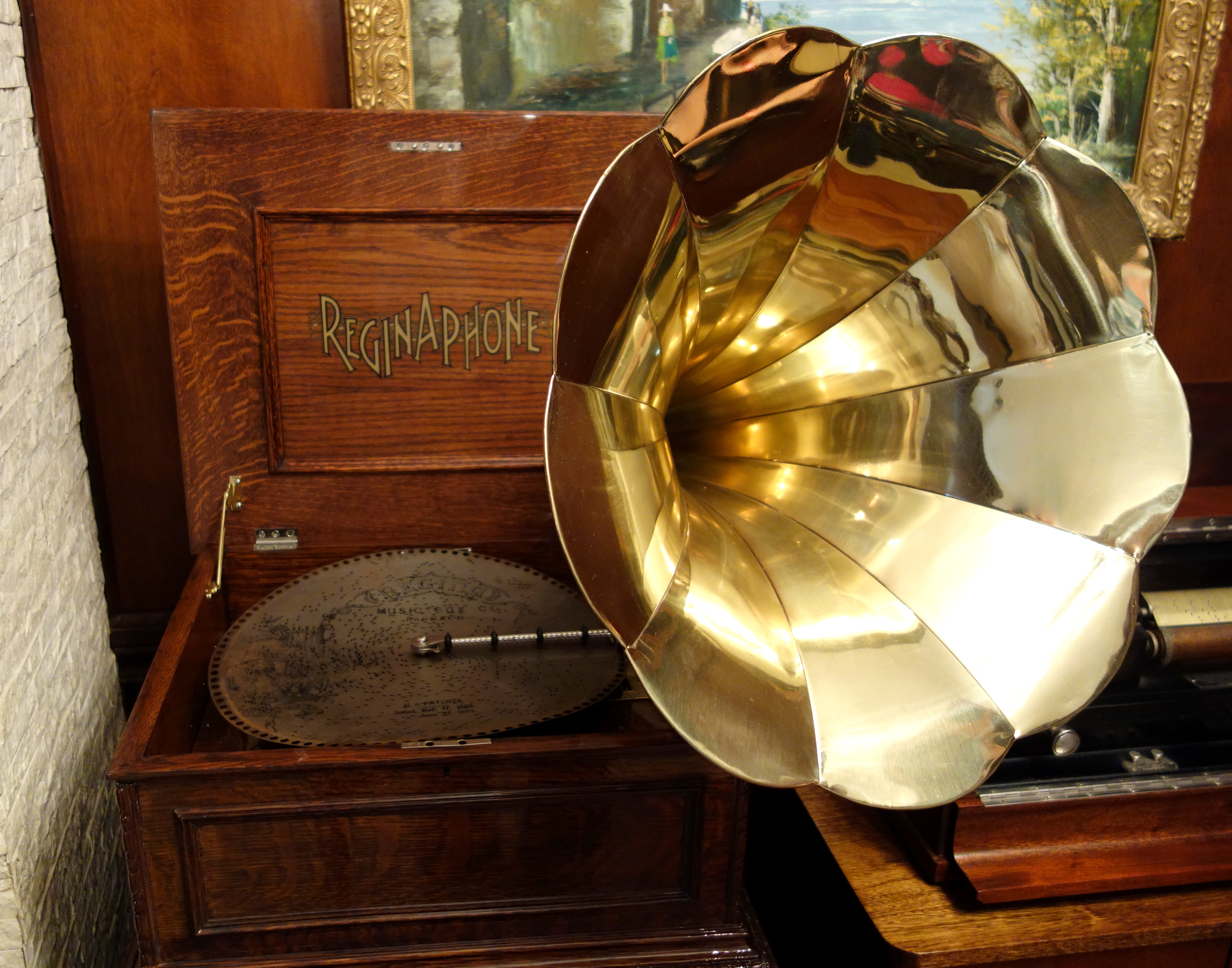
Reginaphone

Regina Music Box – Regina's music boxes were their original product, and they had an 80–90% share of the market at the company's peak. Regina music boxes use a flat metal disc, as opposed to a cylinder. Sizes ranged from 8.5 to 27 inches. The boxes were renowned for the rich tone, and they used a double set of tuned teeth.

Music boxes by Regina and other manufacturers can be seen and heard at the Musical Museum, Brentford, England.

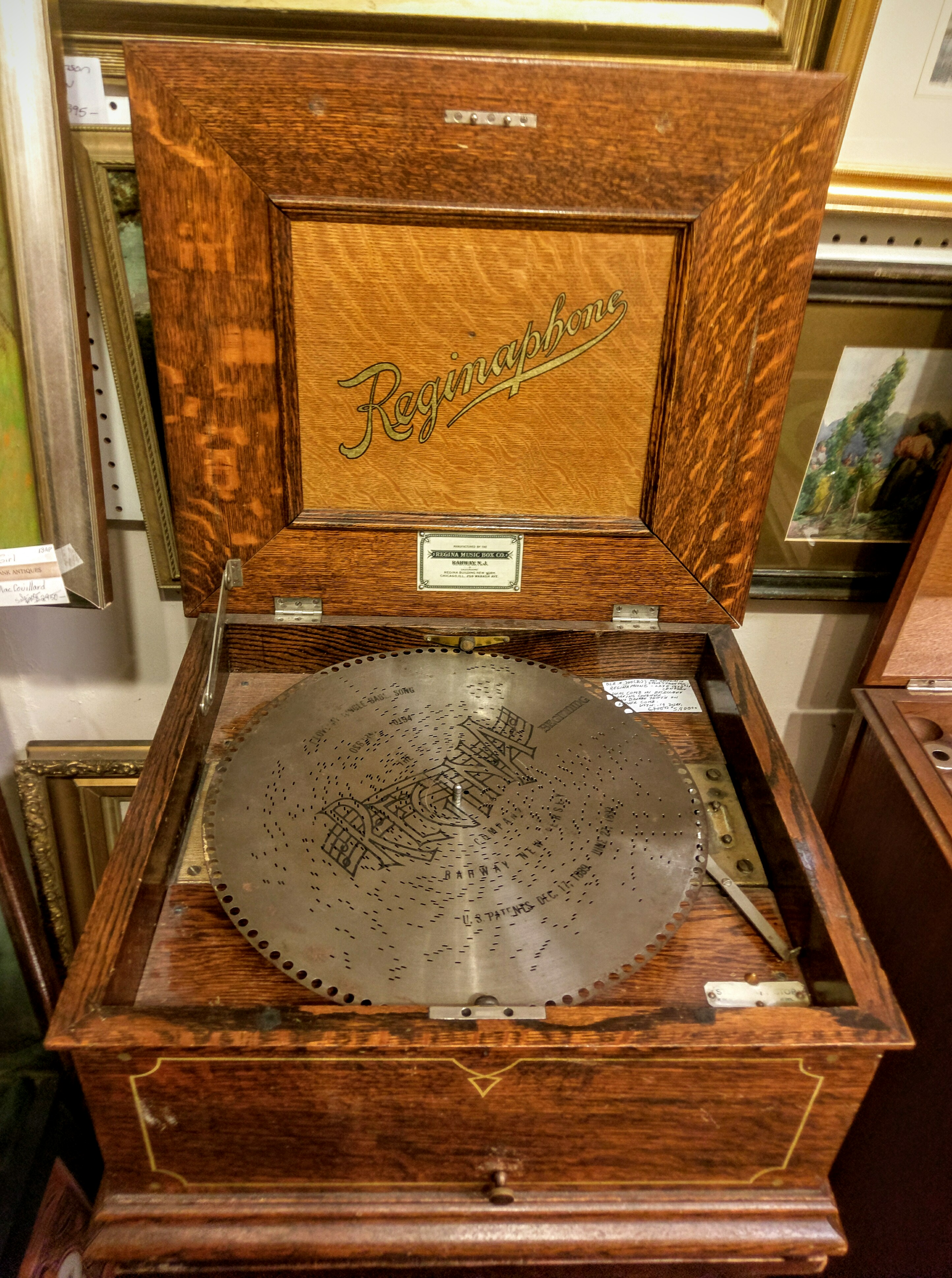
A Reginaphone

Reginaphone – A response to the competition posed by the phonograph, the Reginaphone was a hybrid machine that played both music box discs and phonographs. Regina used a phonograph mechanism manufactured by the American Graphophone Company, which evolved into Columbia Records.

Coin Piano – Regina sold player pianos which were manufactured by other companies, sometimes putting German-made mechanisms into their own cases. One model was branded the "Reginapiano".

Concerto – The concerto used a 32-inch music box disc to control a player piano.

Phonograph – Regina branded several lines of phonographs, including the Hexaphone, Corona Talking Machine and Princess Phonographs.

== See also ==
- Music box
- Player piano
