= Jimmy Bennett =

American actor (born 1996)

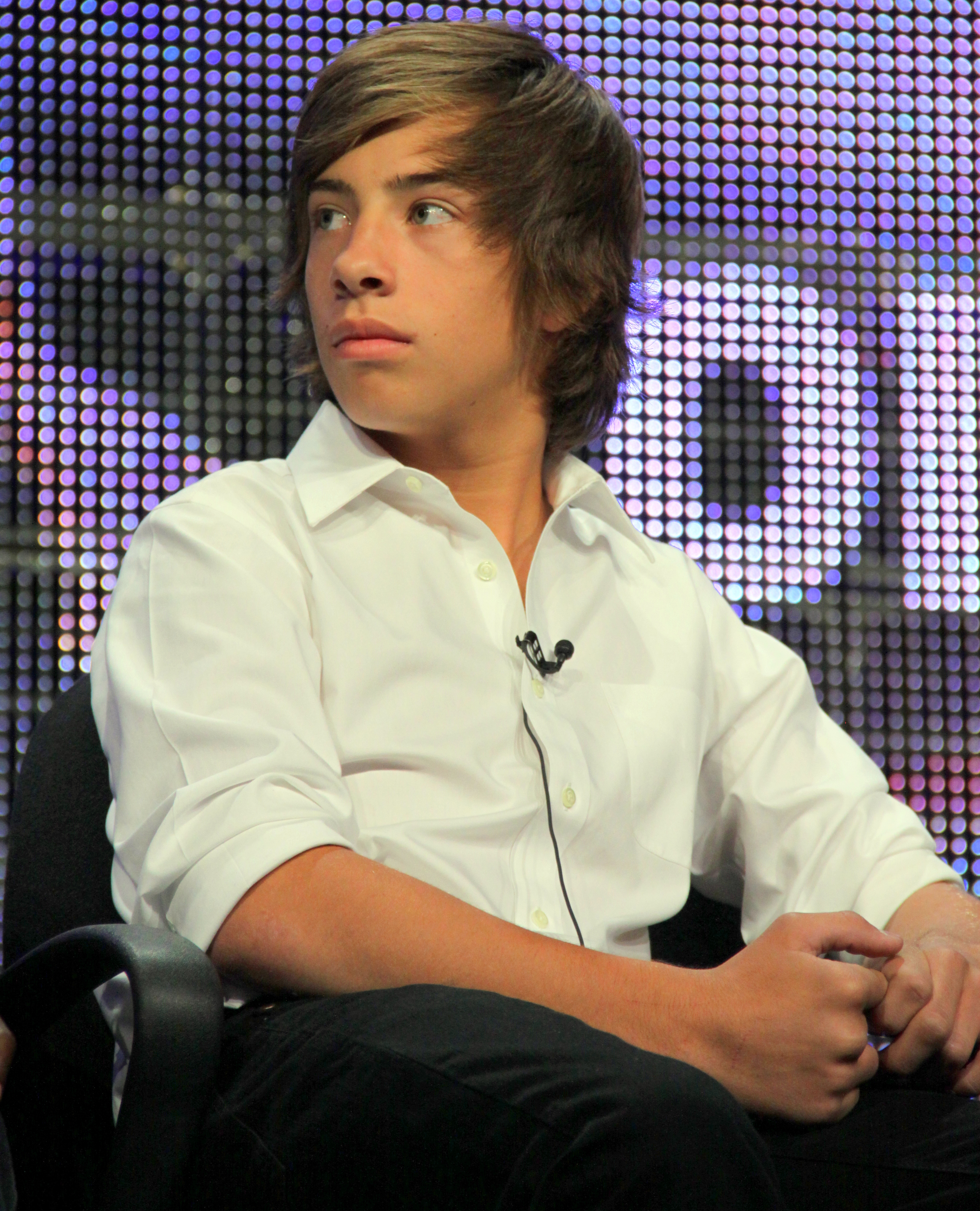
- Bennett at the Television Critics Association in 2010
- Born: James Michael Bennett; February 9, 1996 (age 30); Seal Beach, California, U.S.
- Occupation: Actor
- Years active: 2002–2022

James Michael Bennett (born February 9, 1996) is an American actor. He is known for his roles as a child actor in Daddy Day Care, Hostage, The Amityville Horror, Poseidon, Evan Almighty, Orphan, Shorts, and as young James T. Kirk in the 2009 film Star Trek. He also starred on the ABC series No Ordinary Family as JJ Powell, a teenager gifted with vast intelligence after a plane crash.

== Early life ==
Bennett was born on February 9, 1996, in Seal Beach, California, and lives with his parents and sister in Huntington Beach, California, where the family ran a hard rock–themed crêpe restaurant. Bennett also plays guitar and sings on his official YouTube channel. He also wrote and performed the song "Summer Never Ends", which can be heard at the end of Shorts.

== Career ==
Bennett appeared in nearly 30 television advertisements, as well as in episodes of the television series The Guardian and Strong Medicine, before being cast in the role of "Tony", the boy who wants to be the Flash, in the Eddie Murphy comedy Daddy Day Care. He had smaller roles in the films Anchorman: The Legend of Ron Burgundy and Arthur Hailey's Detective, and also appeared in Judging Amy, CSI: Crime Scene Investigation and Everwood, and lent his voice to characters in the animated films The Jungle Book 2, Winnie the Pooh: Springtime with Roo, Pooh's Heffalump Halloween Movie, I Want a Dog for Christmas, Charlie Brown and The Polar Express. He has been nominated for Young Artist Awards five times.

In August 2011, Bennett released his debut single "Over Again" and the accompanying music video.

== Sexual assault allegations against Asia Argento ==
According to documents obtained by The New York Times, a $380,000 settlement was made between Bennett and actress Asia Argento after Bennett claimed that Argento sexually assaulted him in a California hotel room in 2013, when he was 17 and Argento was 37. Bennett said that after the encounter he began to feel "extremely confused, mortified, and disgusted".

Bennett's lawyer wrote that in the years after the incident, Bennett was so traumatized that his job performance, income, and mental health declined. They first met when Bennett played Argento's son in the 2004 film The Heart Is Deceitful Above All Things when Bennett was 7 years old and she was 28. He notified Argento that he intended to sue in November 2017, shortly after she went public with rape accusations against Harvey Weinstein. Argento countered that Bennett "sexually attacked" her, and that her partner Anthony Bourdain had arranged to pay $380,000 as part of the settlement.

Following Argento's denials, a photograph of her topless in bed with Bennett was published, as well as her alleged admission of sex with him in text messages to model Rain Dove. In the screenshots, Argento reputedly stated: "I had sex with him it felt weird. I didn't know he was a minor until the shakedown letter." Dove confirmed in a statement that they had provided the texts to police in response to Argento's apparent admission to "sexual engagement with a minor ... which is an illegal act that can qualify as statutory rape," as well as "receiving continued nude images without reporting/blocking the account/written rejection/or action."

In August 2018, actress Rose McGowan spoke out in support of Bennett. She wrote to Argento: "You were my friend. I loved you. I really hope you find your way through this process to rehabilitation and betterment. Do the right thing. Be honest. Be fair. Let justice stay its course. [...] be the person you wish Harvey could have been."

In a letter published online in September, Argento's attorney admitted there was a sexual encounter, but claimed Bennett "sexually attacked" Argento. As of September 2018, Bennett and his lawyer Gordon Sattro were working with a Los Angeles County Sheriff's investigation regarding the claims of sexual assault against Argento.

== Filmography ==
Film roles
Year	Title	Role	Notes
2003	The Jungle Book 2	Hathi Jr.	Voice
2003	Daddy Day Care	The Flash/Tony	
2004	Winnie the Pooh: Springtime with Roo	Roo	Voice
2004	The Heart Is Deceitful Above All Things	Young Jeremiah	
2004	Anchorman: The Legend of Ron Burgundy	Tommy	
2004	The Polar Express	Billy the Lonely Boy	Voice
2005	Hostage	Tommy Smith	
2005	The Amityville Horror	Michael Lutz	
2005	Pooh's Heffalump Halloween Movie	Roo	Voice
2006	Firewall	Andy Stanfield	
2006	Poseidon	Conor James	
2006	Shark Bait	Young Pi	Voice
2007	Evan Almighty	Ryan Baxter	
2007	South of Pico	Mark Weston	
2008	Diminished Capacity	Dillon	
2008	Snow Buddies	Buddha	Voice
2008	Trucker	Peter	
2009	Star Trek	Young James T. Kirk	
2009	Orphan	Daniel "Danny" Coleman	
2009	Shorts	Toby Thompson	
2009	Alabama Moon	Moon Blake	
2009	Stolen	John Wakefield	
2010	Bones	Bones White	
2011	Ghild	Ralph Gullivan	Short film
2013	Movie 43	Nathan	Segment: "Middleschool Date"
2014	Camouflage	Kevin	
2015	Bad Asses on the Bayou	Ronald	
2015	A Girl Like Her	Brian Slater	
2017	Heartthrob	Dustin	

Television roles
Year	Title	Role	Notes
2002	Strong Medicine	Willy	Episode: "Admissions"
2002	The Guardian	Matty Butler	Episode: "Monster"
2003	Judging Amy	Cory Sinkler	Episode: "Just Say Oops"
2003	I Want a Dog for Christmas, Charlie Brown	Rerun Van Pelt	Voice, television special
2004	CSI: Crime Scene Investigation	Henry Turner	Episode: "Paper or Plastic?"
2004–2005	Everwood	Sam Feeney	3 episodes
2005	Detective	Ivan Tempone	Television film
2006	He's a Bully, Charlie Brown	Rerun van Pelt	Voice, television special
2007	Gilmore Girls	Macon	Episode: "Santa's Secret Stuff"
2010–2011	No Ordinary Family	James "JJ" Powell Jr.	Main cast; 20 episodes
2011	Breaking In		Episode: "21.0 Jump Street"
2012	Perception	Alex Willingham	2 episodes
2014	Garfunkel and Oates	Braden	Episode: "Maturity"
2015	Murder in the First	Alfie Rentman	2 episodes
2016	From Dusk till Dawn: The Series	Fanglorious Bandmate	1 episode
2017	Bosch	Mojo	4 episodes
2022	Pachinko	Andrew Holmes	Episode: "Chapter Seven"

Video game roles
Year	Title	Role	Notes
2004	The Polar Express	Billy the Lonely Boy	
2005	Winnie the Pooh's Rumbly Tumbly Adventure	Roo	
2006	Kingdom Hearts II	Roo	English dub
2007	Kingdom Hearts II: Final Mix+	Roo	English dub

Music Video Appearance
Title	Year	Performer	Album	Ref.
"Stingray Affliction"	2014	Issues	Issues	
"Downfalls High"	2021	Machine Gun Kelly	Tickets To My Downfall	

== Awards and nominations ==
Year	Award	Category	Work	Result
2004	Young Artist Award	Best Performance in a Feature Film – Young Actor Age Ten or Younger	Daddy Day Care	Nominated
2004	Young Artist Award	Best Performance in a Feature Film – Young Ensemble Cast	Daddy Day Care	Nominated
2005	Young Artist Award	Outstanding Young Ensemble in a New Medium	The Polar Express	Won
2007	Young Artist Award	Best Performance in a Feature Film – Young Actor Age Ten or Younger	Firewall	Nominated
2008	Young Artist Award	Best Performance in a Feature Film – Supporting Young Actor (Comedy or Musical)	Evan Almighty	Nominated
2010	Young Artist Award	Best Performance in a Feature Film – Leading Young Actor	Alabama Moon	Nominated
2010	Young Artist Award	Best Performance in a Feature Film – Young Ensemble Cast	Shorts	Won
2014	Golden Raspberry Award	Worst Screen Combo (shared with the entire cast)	Movie 43	Nominated
