= List of The Snoopy Show episodes =

The Snoopy Show is an animated streaming television series inspired by the Peanuts comic strip by Charles M. Schulz. Developed by Rob Boutilier, Mark Evestaff, and Alex Galatis, and produced by WildBrain, it debuted on February 5, 2021, on Apple TV+. Each episode consists of three 7-minute segments. Season 2 premiered with the first half on March 11, 2022 while the next half of the season premiered on August 12, 2022. A holiday special was released on December 2, 2022. Season 3 was released on June 9, 2023.

During the course of the series, 39 episodes of The Snoopy Show were released over three seasons, between February 5, 2021, and December 1, 2023.

== Series overview ==
Season	Segments	Episodes	Originally released	
Season	Segments	Episodes	First released	Last released
1	39	13	February 5, 2021	July 9, 2021
2	39	13	March 11, 2022	December 2, 2022
3	39	13	June 9, 2023	December 1, 2023

== Episodes ==
=== Season 1 (2021) ===
No. overall	No. in season	Title	Directed by	Written by	Original release date
1	1	"A Snoopy Tale"	Steve Evangelatos	Miles Smith	February 5, 2021
1	1	"When Snoopy Met Woodstock"	Behzad Mansoori-Dara	Laurie Elliott	February 5, 2021
1	1	"Happiness Is a Dancing Dog"	Ridd Sorensen	Craig Brown	February 5, 2021
Snoopy writes a book about his younger days; reveals the origin of his friendship with Woodstock; and gets the dancing bug.
2	2	"Nest Friends"	Steve Evangelatos	Alex Galatis	February 5, 2021
2	2	"Mission: Lunch Possible"	Behzad Mansoori-Dara	Mark Evestaff & Betsy Walters	February 5, 2021
2	2	"Too Dog Hot"	Ridd Sorensen	Laurie Elliott	February 5, 2021
Snoopy invites Woodstock to move in with him; embarks on a mission to bring Sally's sandwich to school; and tries to cool off on a hot day.
3	3	"Frightfully Snoopy"	Steve Evangelatos	Josh Saltzman	February 5, 2021
3	3	"Dress-Up Snoopy"	Behzad Mansoori-Dara	Bob Gaylor	February 5, 2021
3	3	"Trick Snoopy"	Ridd Sorensen	Alex Galatis	February 5, 2021
Snoopy goes to a scary movie with Woodstock; advises Charlie Brown on his Halloween costume; and gives tricks to kids instead of treats.
4	4	"Happiness Is a Snow Day"	Steve Evangelatos	Craig Brown	February 5, 2021
4	4	"Sled Alert"	Behzad Mansoori-Dara	Scott Montgomery	February 5, 2021
4	4	"Snowman Showman"	Ridd Sorensen	Betsy Walters	February 5, 2021
Snoopy shows Marcie how to enjoy a snow day; helps Rerun retrieve a runaway sled; and builds a snowman with Woodstock.
5	5	"Happy Bird-Day"	Steve Evangelatos	Mark Edwards	February 5, 2021
5	5	"Never Bargain with a Beagle"	Behzad Mansoori-Dara	Carly DeNure	February 5, 2021
5	5	"Daisy Crazy"	Ridd Sorensen	Michael Hanley	February 5, 2021
Snoopy forgets Woodstock's birthday; uses chores as payment at Lucy's yard sale; and replaces a daisy for Charlie Brown.
6	6	"Birdie Love"	Steve Evangelatos	Scott Montgomery	February 5, 2021
6	6	"By-the-Book Beagle"	Behzad Mansoori-Dara	Jeremy Winkels	February 5, 2021
6	6	"Not So Funny Business"	Ridd Sorensen	Aaron Eves	February 5, 2021
Woodstock protects a badminton birdie; Snoopy decides to pen a prize-winning novel; and he feels guilty when Rerun is injured while they’re playing.
7	7	"Abraca-Snoopy"	Steve Evangelatos	Jeff Sager	July 9, 2021
7	7	"All's Fair, Snoopy"	Behzad Mansoori-Dara	Scott Montgomery	July 9, 2021
7	7	"Suppertime Blues"	Ridd Sorensen	Shawn Kalb	July 9, 2021
Snoopy puts on a magic show that affects Woodstock; avoids going to the vet for his cold; and discovers the difficulties of making dinner.
8	8	"The Dog-Tor Is In"	Steve Evangelatos	Kirsten Rasmussen	July 9, 2021
8	8	"Babysitter Beagle"	Behzad Mansoori-Dara	Ashley Botting	July 9, 2021
8	8	"Keep on Tricyclin'"	Ridd Sorensen	Andrew Shenkman	July 9, 2021
Snoopy sets up a therapy booth to rival Lucy’s; co-parents a lost egg with Woodstock; and teaches Rerun how to ride a tricycle.
9	9	"Beagle to the Rescue"	Steve Evangelatos	Scott Montgomery	July 9, 2021
9	9	"Surf's Up, Snoopy!"	Behzad Mansoori-Dara	Craig Brown	July 9, 2021
9	9	"Helicopter Beagle"	Ridd Sorensen	Mark Edwards	July 9, 2021
Snoopy comes to the rescue of his least favorite neighbor; gets stranded on a sandbar; and chauffeurs an injured Woodstock.
10	10	"Balloon Beagle"	Steve Evangelatos	Aaron Eves	July 9, 2021
10	10	"Above Par Beagle"	Behzad Mansoori-Dara	Scott Montgomery	July 9, 2021
10	10	"Happiness Is a Good Book"	Ridd Sorensen	Bobby Gaylor	July 9, 2021
Snoopy loses Sally’s balloon; creates chaos trying to win at mini golf; and has a hard time being quiet at the library.
11	11	"My Fair Beagle"	Steve Evangelatos	Betsy Walters	July 9, 2021
11	11	"Snoopy Saves the Earth"	Behzad Mansoori-Dara	Scott Montgomery	July 9, 2021
11	11	"Photo Safari Snoopy"	Ridd Sorensen	Jocelyn Geddie	July 9, 2021
Snoopy gets enrolled at Lucy’s etiquette school; drops the ball protecting a prop for the kids’ Earth Day play; and sets up a unique photo safari.
12	12	"Happiness Is Being with Family"	Steve Evangelatos	Carly DeNure	July 9, 2021
12	12	"Follow the Leader, Snoopy"	Behzad Mansoori-Dara	Scott Montgomery	July 9, 2021
12	12	"Snoopy's Slumber Party"	Ridd Sorensen	Kirsten Rasmussen	July 9, 2021
Snoopy invites his family over for dinner; leads the Beagle Scouts on a quest to find his brother Spike; and lets Olaf, another brother, sleep over.
13	13	"Snoopy Stays Over"	Steve Evangelatos	Andrew Shenkman	July 9, 2021
13	13	"Good Luck, Chuck"	Behzad Mansoori-Dara	Scott Montgomery	July 9, 2021
13	13	"Joe Motocross at Your Service"	Ridd Sorensen	Jocelyn Geddie	July 9, 2021
Snoopy finds out Lucy’s definition of fun; coaches Charlie Brown in a potato sack race; and lets his imagination run wild thanks to Sally’s new bike.

=== Season 2 (2022) ===
No. overall	No. in season	Title	Directed by	Written by	Original release date
14	1	"Chips Fall Where They May"	Steve Evangelatos	Craig Brown	March 11, 2022
14	1	"Which Nest is Best?"	Behzad Mansoori-Dara	Aaron Eves	March 11, 2022
14	1	"The Mess Express"	Ridd Sorensen	Laurie Elliott	March 11, 2022
Charlie Brown finds an extraordinary potato chip; Woodstock moves into a new nest; and Snoopy gets distracted cleaning his doghouse.
15	2	"Better Feathers"	Steve Evangelatos	Kirsten Rasmussen	March 11, 2022
15	2	"Blanket Blues"	Behzad Mansoori-Dara	Carly DeNure	March 11, 2022
15	2	"Once Upon a Cloud"	Ridd Sorensen	Betsy Walters	March 11, 2022
Snoopy gives Woodstock a makeover; loses Linus’ beloved blanket; and heads to the skies for wild adventures.
16	3	"Bunny Wunny Buddy"	Steve Evangelatos	Laurie Elliott	March 11, 2022
16	3	"Hearts for My Sweet Baboo"	Behzad Mansoori-Dara	Betsy Walters	March 11, 2022
16	3	"Three Cheers for Snoopy"	Ridd Sorensen	Kirsten Rasmussen	March 11, 2022
Snoopy takes a liking to a new stuffed bunny; plays cupid on Sally’s behalf; and learns to keep his cool when he loses.
17	4	"Happy Birthday Rerun"	Steve Evangelatos	Bobby Gaylor	March 11, 2022
17	4	"Woodstock Flies South"	Behzad Mansoori-Dara	Betsy Walters	March 11, 2022
17	4	"Pogo Champ Lucy"	Ridd Sorensen	Carly DeNure	March 11, 2022
Lucy throws Rerun a birthday party; Snoopy stops at nothing to keep Woodstock from flying south for the winter; and Snoopy turns out to be a pogo stick pro.
18	5	"You Busted My Bust"	Steve Evangelatos	Julie Prescott	March 11, 2022
18	5	"Hide and Go Snoopy"	Behzad Mansoori-Dara	Christopher Gentile	March 11, 2022
18	5	"King Snoopy"	Ridd Sorensen	Art Roche	March 11, 2022
Schroeder wants to honor Beethoven properly; Woodstock stumbles upon a toy paradise; and Snoopy lets a day for beagles go to his head.
19	6	"Snoopy Makes a Speech"	Steve Evangelatos	Jordan Gershowitz	March 11, 2022
19	6	"How to be a Beagle Scout"	Behzad Mansoori-Dara	Scott Montongomery	March 11, 2022
19	6	"Happiness is a Rainy Day"	Ridd Sorensen	Jarrett Krosoczka	March 11, 2022
Snoopy is asked to speak before the Head Beagle; tries to escape the modern world with his Beagle Scouts; and discovers rainy days can be fun.
20	7	"Snoopy's Summertime Fun"	Steve Evangelatos	Andrew Shenkman	August 12, 2022
20	7	"Snoopy Plays Ball"	Behzad Mansoori-Dara	Mark Edwards	August 12, 2022
20	7	"Don't Worry, be Crabby"	Ridd Sorensen	Craig Brown	August 12, 2022
Snoopy wants to have as much fun as he can before summer ends; Snoopy freshens up a game of fetch; and Lucy wakes up in a bad mood.
21	8	"Birthday Beagle"	Steve Evangelatos	Tom Ruegger	August 12, 2022
21	8	"Beagle with a Job"	Behzad Mansoori-Dara	Mike Hollingsworth	August 12, 2022
21	8	"Legal Beagle"	Ridd Sorensen	Scott Montgomery	August 12, 2022
Charlie Brown plans a surprise party for Snoopy’s birthday; Snoopy proves he’s not lazy; and Snoopy takes Charlie Brown to court over a bad dinner.
22	9	"The Snoopy Report"	Steve Evangelatos	Scott Montgomery	August 12, 2022
22	9	"Seventh Inning Snoopy"	Behzad Mansoori-Dara	Thomas Krajewski	August 12, 2022
22	9	"The Cactus Crew"	Ridd Sorensen	Kevin Burke and Chris "Doc" Wyatt	August 12, 2022
A newsletter gets the inside scoop on Charlie Brown; the gang learns to have fun from the cheap seats; and Spike invites Snoopy to the desert.
23	10	"Bouncing Baby Beagle"	Steve Evangelatos	Mike Hollingsworth	August 12, 2022
23	10	"Snoopy on the Mound"	Behzad Mansoori-Dara	Thomas Krajewski	August 12, 2022
23	10	"Snoopy Swap"	Ridd Sorensen	Scott Montgomery	August 12, 2022
Sally takes care of Snoopy for the weekend; Charlie Brown quits the baseball team; and Peppermint Patty uses Snoopy as a stand-in.
24	11	"Scarecrow Snoopy"	Steve Evangelatos	Art Roche	August 12, 2022
24	11	"Handyman Snoopy"	Behzad Mansoori-Dara	Scott Montgomery	August 12, 2022
24	11	"Happiness is Your Favorite Thing"	Ridd Sorensen	Tom Ruegger	August 12, 2022
Lucy hires Snoopy to protect her garden; Snoopy offers construction services to the neighborhood; and Snoopy’s old dog bowl is sorely missed.
25	12	"Too Much Togetherness"	Steve Evangelatos	Scott Montgomery	August 12, 2022
25	12	"Snoopy Goes for Gold"	Behzad Mansoori-Dara	Carly DeNure	August 12, 2022
25	12	"Happiness is a Song in Your Heart"	Ridd Sorensen	Betsy Walters	August 12, 2022
Charlie Brown wants more attention from Snoopy; Sally’s class pet makes Snoopy jealous; and Lucy believes musicals cause nothing but trouble.
26	13	"Twas The Nest Before Christmas"	Steve Evangelatos	Scott Montgomery	December 1, 2022
26	13	"Happiness is the Gift of Giving"	Behzad Mansoori-Dara	Carly DeNure	December 1, 2022
26	13	"Do Not Open Until"	Ridd Sorensen	Betsy Walters	December 1, 2022
Snoopy adapts a Christmas poem to help Sally sleep; Charlie Brown makes gifts for his pals; and Snoopy can’t wait to open his presents.

=== Season 3 (2023) ===
No. overall	No. in season	Title	Directed by	Written by	Original release date
27	1	"Happiness Is a Day at the Beach"	Ridd Sorensen	Deborah Chantson	June 9, 2023
27	1	"The Dog Ate My Homework"	Behzad Mansoori-Dara & Mélanie Daigle	Scott Montgomery	June 9, 2023
27	1	"License to Beagle"	Steve Evangelatos	Carly DeNure	June 9, 2023
Snoopy and Woodstock search for pirate treasure; the Flying Ace steals Sally's map; and Snoopy's expired dog licence presents opportunities.
28	2	"Secret Agent Snoopy"	Ridd Sorensen	Betsy Walters	June 9, 2023
28	2	"Woodstock Gets the Hiccups"	Behzad Mansoori-Dara & Mélanie Daigle	Jiro Okada	June 9, 2023
28	2	"Happiness Is a Hug That Lasts"	Steve Evangelatos	Tally Knoll	June 9, 2023
Secret Agent Snoopy looks for Charlie Brown; the Beagle Scouts come to Woodstock's aid; and a hug from Snoopy goes into overtime.
29	3	"Beagle Air"	Ridd Sorensen	Art Roche	June 9, 2023
29	3	"The Leprechaun Beagle"	Behzad Mansoori-Dara & Mélanie Daigle	Jocelyn Geddie	June 9, 2023
29	3	"Marcie's Quiet Spot"	Steve Evangelatos	Scott Montgomery	June 9, 2023
Snoopy and Marcie help Peppermint Patty with her report; Rerun mistakes Snoopy for a leprechaun; and Marcie’s quiet spot is discovered.
30	4	"Five Star Beagle"	Ridd Sorensen	Scott Montgomery	June 9, 2023
30	4	"Spike Comes for a Visit"	Mélanie Daigle	Thomas Krajewski	June 9, 2023
30	4	"Rejection Letter Blues"	Steve Evangelatos	Craig Brown	June 9, 2023
Lucy gives Snoopy a test; Spike and Snoopy forget to agree where to meet up; and Snoopy turns the tables on rejection letters.
31	5	"Snoopy Quits the Ball Team"	Ridd Sorensen	Jocelyn Geddie	June 9, 2023
31	5	"Chez Marcie"	Behzad Mansoori-Dara & Mélanie Daigle	Scott Montgomery	June 9, 2023
31	5	"Scary Moon"	Steve Evangelatos	Kirsten Rasmussen	June 9, 2023
Snoopy quits the baseball team; Peppermint Patty feels left out of Marcie and Snoopy’s playdate; and Snoopy fears a falling moon.
32	6	"Battle of the Blanket"	Ridd Sorensen	Art Roche	June 9, 2023
32	6	"Charlie Brown Hits a Homerun"	Mélanie Daigle	Scott Montgomery	June 9, 2023
32	6	"Party Crashers"	Steve Evangelatos	Tally Knoll	June 9, 2023
Linus wants to thwart Snoopy’s blanket-stealing ways; Charlie Brown finally hits a home run; and a bill that Woodstock sends Snoopy for breaking a vase during a wild party results in the two of them ending their friendship.
33	7	"Happiness Is a Good Skate"	Ridd Sorensen	Taylor Annisette	June 9, 2023
33	7	"The Beagle Games"	Mélanie Daigle	Jiro Okada	June 9, 2023
33	7	"Run for it, Marcie"	Steve Evangelatos	Scott Montgomery	June 9, 2023
Snoopy needs ice to practise his quadruple axel; competes in the Alpine Beagle Games; and fills in for Marcie on the track.
34	8	"Grandpa Always Says"	Ridd Sorensen	Scott Montgomery	June 9, 2023
34	8	"Snoopy on the Mend"	Mélanie Daigle	Carly DeNure	June 9, 2023
34	8	"It was a Dark and Stormy Summer"	Steve Evangelatos	Betsy Walters	June 9, 2023
Franklin considers getting a dog; an injured Snoopy doesn’t want Charlie Brown’s help; and Peppermint Patty seeks writing advice.
35	9	"Snoopy on the Move"	Ridd Sorensen	Aaron Eves	June 9, 2023
35	9	"Referee Snoopy"	Mélanie Daigle	Scott Montgomery	June 9, 2023
35	9	"Interview with a Beagle"	Steve Evangelatos	Jocelyn Geddie	June 9, 2023
Snoopy moves his doghouse to avoid the cat next door; referees neighbourhood conflicts; and is interviewed by Peppermint Patty.
36	10	"Sally's Comet"	Ridd Sorensen	Thomas Krajewski	June 9, 2023
36	10	"Lights, Camera, Beagle"	Mélanie Daigle	Scott Montgomery	June 9, 2023
36	10	"The Masked Marble"	Steve Evangelatos	Nicole Stamp	June 9, 2023
Sally asks Snoopy to keep her awake so she can see a comet; Charlie Brown tries recording team practice; and Snoopy’s a poor sport at marbles.
37	11	"Befuddled Beagle"	Ridd Sorensen	Kimberly Small	June 9, 2023
37	11	"Sally Goes Camping"	Mélanie Daigle	Daniel Fernandes	June 9, 2023
37	11	"Carnival Snoopy"	Steve Evangelatos	Scott Montgomery	June 9, 2023
A puzzle frustrates Snoopy; Sally gets a lesson on summer-camp fun; and Snoopy’s height falls short of the best carnival rides.
38	12	"Dear Snoopy"	Ridd Sorensen	Art Roche	June 9, 2023
38	12	"Joe School"	Mélanie Daigle	Betsy Walters	June 9, 2023
38	12	"Forever Snoopy"	Steve Evangelatos	Scott Montgomery	June 9, 2023
Snoopy starts an advice column; gets permission at last to go to school; and reminisces about his favorite things.
39	13	"Happiness is Holiday Traditions"	Ridd Sorensen	Carly DeNure	December 1, 2023
39	13	"Window Wonderland"	Mélanie Daigle	Scott Montgomery	December 1, 2023
39	13	"Spike’s Old-Fashioned Christmas"	Steve Evangelatos	Betsy Walters	December 1, 2023
Snoopy searches for the perfect tree topper; Woodstock gets trapped in a window display; and Snoopy and Woodstock visit Spike for Christmas.
