= Shane Baumel =

American actor (born 1997)

- Born: Shane R. Baumel; February 12, 1997 (age 29); Long Beach, California, U.S.
- Occupation: Actor
- Years active: 2003–2011

Shane R. Baumel (born February 12, 1997) is an American former actor. He made his film debut playing Crispin in Daddy Day Care. He also had a role in Wild Hogs, starring Tim Allen, and appeared on TV a few times, in shows such as The Emperor's New School, as the voice of Tipo. He has additionally appeared in the 2004 TV movie "A Boyfriend for Christmas" and in Adventures in Odyssey, a Christian radio drama, as the voice of Everett Meltsner.

== Filmography ==
=== Film ===
Year	Title	Role	Notes
2003	Daddy Day Care	Crispin	
2004	A Boyfriend for Christmas	Neal Grant	
2006	The Bondage	Young Charlie	
2006	Curious George	Kid	Voice
2006	Ice Age: The Meltdown	Additional Voices	Voice
2006	Over the Hedge	Spike	Voice
2006	The Ant Bully	Red Teammate #6	Voice
2006	Hammy's Boomerang Adventure	Spike	Voice
2006	Happy Feet	Additional Voices	Voice
2007	Wild Hogs	Toby	
2008	Surviving Sid	Whiny Beaver Boy	Voice
2009	Cloudy with a Chance of Meatballs	Additional Voices	Voice
2010	Yogi Bear	Additional Voices	Voice
2011	Happiness Is A Warm Blanket, Charlie Brown	Pig-Pen	Voice

=== Television ===
Year	Title	Role	Notes
2003	The Bernie Mac Show	Billy	
2005	Phil of the Future	Phil, age 5	Episode: "Maybe-Sitting"
2005	The King of Queens	Brandon	Episode: "Catching Hell"
2006	The New Adventures of Old Christine	Kid	2 Episodes
2006-07	The Emperor's New School	Tipo	Voice, 19 episodes
2007	Andy Barker, P.I.	Boy	

=== Video games ===
Year	Video games	Role	Notes
2006	Over the Hedge	Spike	
2006	The Ant Bully	Ant Kid	
