= Rerun Van Pelt =

Peanuts comic strip character

- Peanuts character
- Rerun on the back of his mother's bicycle in It's Arbor Day, Charlie Brown (1976)
- First appearance: May 23, 1972 (birth and first mention); March 26, 1973 (official debut)
- Last appearance: January 30, 2000 (comic strip)
- Voiced by: Vinnie Dow (1976); Jason Muller (1983 and 1985); Tim Deters (2002) (as Timmy Deters); Jimmy Bennett (2003 and 2006) (credited as James Bennett); Finn Carr (2016); Daniel Thornton (2016, as a baby); Milo Toriel-McGibbon (2019)

In-universe information
- Gender: Male
- Family: Linus Van Pelt (older brother); Lucy Van Pelt (older sister); Unnamed parents; Unnamed blanket-hating grandmother; Marian (aunt); Felix Van Pelt (paternal grandfather)
- Nationality: American

Rerun Van Pelt is Linus and Lucy's younger brother in Charles M. Schulz's comic strip Peanuts. Lucy, who had wanted a sister, disparagingly called the situation a "rerun" of the birth of her brother Linus, so Linus nicknames the child "Rerun". Despite Lucy's initial disappointment, she becomes a warm and protective older sister.

Rerun was a minor character in the strip when he was introduced in 1972. In the 1980s, he mostly appeared in sequences riding on the back of his mother's bicycle. However, in the late 1990s (the final years of the strip) he became a major presence, as Schulz felt that his main cast was "too old" for some of the themes he wanted to explore. In a 1997 interview in Comics Journal, Schulz admitted, "Lately, Rerun has almost taken over the strip."

Rerun made his first appearance in animation in the 1976 special It's Arbor Day, Charlie Brown, voiced by Vinnie Dow. He returned in the 1983–1985 series The Charlie Brown and Snoopy Show, voiced by Jason Mendelson, the four-year-old son of producer Bill Mendelson. Rerun was the main character in the 2003 special I Want a Dog for Christmas, Charlie Brown, with a storyline drawn from the strip's Rerun-heavy final years. He also has an important role in the 2006 special He's a Bully, Charlie Brown.

== Description ==
Rerun bears a strong physical resemblance to Linus. In appearances from the 1970s and 1980s, Rerun is virtually identical to Linus, though he is smaller, wore a plain T-shirt (it appears that he got many hand-me-downs from Linus, as he wore a long-sleeved shirt with Linus's shirt design), and his hair sprang up. Rerun's appearance evolved in the 1990s, as he aged beyond infancy. Rerun was mostly shown wearing overalls, and his hair was shown as shorter and flatter. While he continued to share Linus's facial features, Rerun's head also grew rounder and larger in proportion to his body. In his early TV appearances, he wears a green or white shirt with black shorts and saddle shoes. In I Want A Dog For Christmas, Charlie Brown, he wears an orange striped shirt under light blue overalls.

== Development ==
Rerun started as a minor character in the Peanuts universe, only becoming a main character in the last decade of the comic strip. Rerun was first mentioned in the strip on May 23, 1972, during a storyline in which Lucy throws her younger brother Linus out of the house, only to relent when she learns that yet another little brother had just been born.

Initially, toddler Rerun was shown playing cards with an equally confused Snoopy, and learning to tie his shoes from Lucy.

For many years, Rerun was only seen perched in a seat on the back of his mother's bicycle, wryly commenting on his mother's riding skills and habits. Schulz, a careful observer of ordinary life, was inspired by the sight of young children strapped down for transport. "You look at these little kids hanging on to their elders..." he said, "and you wonder what goes through their minds." Rerun was "a kind of interpreter to those silent thoughts and impressions. The absence of parents and adults in the comic strip means that Rerun must face his trials alone. One critic writes, "Mrs. Van Pelt exposes Rerun to the harsher truths of the outside world. He has to fend for himself in fighting off dogs, handle burdens like her purchases, and deal with setbacks in life, such as potholes. Perhaps she wants to prepare Rerun for the cruelties and failures that Charlie Brown's gang frequently encounters. After all, his older brother, Linus, basically hides under a blanket."

In 1976, Rerun made his first animated appearance in the special It's Arbor Day, Charlie Brown, in a sequence on the back of his mother's bicycle. He was rarely used in the 1980s; by that time, Schulz had run out of ideas about how to use him. "Rerun is still around," Schulz said in a 1984 interview promoting It's Flashbeagle, Charlie Brown. "He rides on the back of his mom's bicycle now and then, and we're going to use him on some of the Saturday morning television shows but I just... run out of ideas on certain subjects, and lately I haven't been able to think of anything where he is on the back of his mom's bicycle. But he's still around."

In the 1990s, Schulz began using Rerun as an opportunity to explore the grandparent/grandchild relationship. Rerun attends his first day of school on September 11, 1996, having spent the previous week hiding under the bed. Rerun ages to 5 years old at this point, still younger than most of the strip's other characters. In a 1997 interview, Schulz said, "We had a few grandchildren who had to start preschool and kindergarten, and I see little kids at the arena, too. I began to get some ideas and so he was the perfect one to have start kindergarten. He's different from Lucy and Linus. He's a little more outspoken. And I think he's going to be a little on the strange side... [laughs] the way he is already. I just had him expelled from school for another day recently, just because he spoke up... He's perfect for that. The other kids are too old for this, really."

One of Rerun's major concerns at this time is his desire for a dog; he sees Snoopy as an ideal companion, but the dog has no particular regard for him.

Rerun's real name is never revealed. In the September 11, 1996 strip when he first starts school, it is suggested that even he himself doesn't know what it is—he tells his (off-screen) teacher "Yes ma'am, my name is 'Rerun'...I don't know...That's what they all call me."

In the final years of the strip — also the final years of Schulz's life — Schulz used Rerun as a way to express his ambivalence about his own talents and limitations. In a sequence in January 1999, the Peanuts characters visit an art museum. In one single-panel wordless strip, the other children gaze at a large oil painting of a landscape, while Rerun, alone at the far right, looks at a small line drawing of the dog from Patrick McDonnell's comic strip Mutts. Despite this symbolic assertion that comic strips are equivalent to other forms of art, the next day's strip finds Rerun back in school, struggling with his own watercolor. "I think I learned something very important," he tells his classmate. "I'll never be Andrew Wyeth." One critic says that "here, Rerun is parroting Schulz's own self-deprecating attitude toward his own medium, comic art."

Ever the enigma, Rerun draws a curtain over Peanuts' final installment of the annual ritual of Lucy pulling the football away just as Charlie Brown tries to place-kick it. In the 1999 Sunday strip, Rerun tells Lucy that their mother wants her to come home for lunch, and she leaves him to hold the football. Charlie Brown rushes toward the ball — but the audience never sees whether he successfully kicks it or not. Lucy returns and asks Rerun what happened, and he replies, "You'll never know". As one critic remarks, "Rerun's presence disrupts the repetitive force of the gag", replacing certainty in this climactic strip with "inexhaustible possibility".

== In adaptations ==
=== Television ===
Rerun's animated debut is in the animated television special It's Arbor Day, Charlie Brown, and his first major appearance in the strip was adapted in the first produced episode of The Charlie Brown and Snoopy Show. Rerun only made one other appearance in a television special before 2000, Happy New Year, Charlie Brown! from 1986, where his attempts to blow up balloons for the New Year's party ended in failure, as he blew them up as cubes rather than spheres (a scenario adapted from a comic strip story involving Linus from December 1954, when Linus was roughly the same age). Rerun was mentioned, but not seen, in the 1985 special Snoopy's Getting Married, Charlie Brown when Charlie Brown informed Snoopy that he could not back out of his wedding, because Rerun had already been chosen as ring-bearer.

Rerun was given a speaking role in the 2002 special Charlie Brown's Christmas Tales. He was the main character in the 2003 special I Want a Dog for Christmas, Charlie Brown, with a storyline drawn from the strip's Rerun-heavy final years. He also has an important role in the 2006 special He's a Bully, Charlie Brown.

He was not seen or mentioned in the 2015 film The Peanuts Movie, although a drawing of him can be seen during the credits.

Various actors have voiced the animated Rerun since 1976, including Vinny Dow, Jason Mendelson, Timmy Deters, and Jimmy Bennett.

=== Voiced by ===
- Vinnie Dow (1976)
- Jason Mendelson (1983–1986) (as Jason Muller)
- Tim Deters (2002) (as Timmy Deters)
- Jimmy Bennett (2003, 2006) (as James Bennett)
- Finn Carr (2016)
- Milo Toriel-McGibbon (2019)
- Kingston Crooks (2023)
- Diego Whalen (2026)

=== Stage ===
Neither of the Broadway productions of You're a Good Man, Charlie Brown and Snoopy! The Musical (aside from a cameo in the animated adaptation) featured Rerun. However, various local and regional productions have included Rerun as a character.
