= Shermy =

Peanuts comic strip character

Shermy Plepler
- Peanuts character
- First appearance: October 2, 1950
- Last appearance: June 15, 1969 (comic strip)
- Voiced by: Various voice actors (see below)

In-universe information
- Gender: Male
- Family: Unnamed sister, Unnamed mother, Unnamed father
- Nationality: American

Shermy is a fictional character from the comic strip Peanuts, by Charles Schulz. Schulz named him after a friend from high school. When Peanuts made its debut on October 2, 1950, Shermy sat on the curb with another early character, Patty, and spoke the first lines of dialogue, ending with "Good ol' Charlie Brown ... How I hate him!" which is ironic, considering how he became one of Charlie Brown's closest friends, along with Linus van Pelt and Schroeder.

Shermy famously played a shepherd in the holiday television special, A Charlie Brown Christmas.

As Peanuts matured, however, Shermy became an extraneous character who was used less and less frequently, until his final appearance in 1969. In a television interview, Schulz said that in the 1950 debut of the strip, it was solely Charlie Brown, Snoopy, and a few minor characters, then showed the first strip, in which the "minor characters" he spoke of were clearly Patty and Shermy. Shermy's name first was mentioned on December 18, 1950, making him the last of the original characters to have their name revealed. In Schulz's Peanuts-precursor strip Li'l Folks, a character resembling Shermy went by the name Charlie Brown.

== Personality and characteristics ==
Shermy was named after Sherman Plepler, a good friend of Schulz from high school. He was often portrayed as Charlie Brown's superior at the things that mattered to Charlie Brown, especially athletics. Shermy's first line in the strip was commenting to Patty, "Good ol' Charlie Brown. ... How I hate him!" The relationship between Shermy and Charlie Brown became more neutral, and eventually friendlier, as the strip progressed. Simultaneously, though, Shermy's role fairly quickly declined in prominence; even as early as 1952, Shermy was seen significantly less frequently than the other characters in the then-small cast. (Only eight characters appeared in Peanuts through 1953: Charlie Brown, Shermy, Patty, Snoopy, Violet, Schroeder, Lucy and Linus.) Nevertheless, by default, Shermy served as Charlie Brown's closest friend until Linus grew old enough to fill that role.

Shermy's major physical characteristic was his short, black hair, which he had styled in a crew cut on April 18, 1953, and kept that way thereafter. Shermy sometimes made reference to the fact he seemed doomed to have that look; he complained to Charlie Brown he got a new hairstyle one weekend only to shortly come down with an illness that kept him from attending school. By the time the illness subsided, Shermy's hair had returned to its normal look, to which Shermy exclaims "I wasted a good haircut!" in not getting to model it at school. Apparently Schulz was not a big fan of this look, as he once commented that he "disliked" the way he drew Shermy's hair, a possible reason for the character being removed. Shermy sometimes was said to play the position of first base on Charlie Brown's baseball team and was referred to as the designated hitter in the Sunday strip from March 13, 1977. In at least one early strip (September 29, 1951), Shermy is implied to be the original owner of Snoopy, several years before Charlie Brown was established as the dog's owner in 1958. Shermy was sometimes shown as being in a relationship with Patty, who seemed mainly interested in him for his collection of comic books. (an example is present in the strip from November 29, 1950)

Shermy's disappearance from the strip was faster and more complete than those of Patty and Violet, who were mostly gone from the series by the late 1960s; as early as late 1952, his appearances were becoming noticeably rare because of the success of newly introduced characters Lucy and Linus. And in later strips, he is seen as the bystander of jokes and sometimes consults Charlie Brown at the wall when he is feeling low. In 1968, his remaining role as straight man was effectively overtaken by Franklin.

== Movies and television specials ==
Shermy appears in multiple animated Peanuts TV specials (although he becomes more of a minor character after the 1960s), beginning with A Charlie Brown Christmas in 1965, where he has one line of dialogue. Upon being cast as a shepherd in the gang's Christmas pageant, he laments being typecast: "Every Christmas it's the same: I always end up playing a shepherd." His appearances also include (sometimes with dialogue and sometimes without) Charlie Brown's All-Stars, It's the Great Pumpkin, Charlie Brown, You're in Love, Charlie Brown, It Was a Short Summer, Charlie Brown, You're Not Elected, Charlie Brown, Be My Valentine, Charlie Brown, It's Your First Kiss, Charlie Brown, Is This Goodbye, Charlie Brown?, Why, Charlie Brown, Why?, It's Spring Training, Charlie Brown, It Was My Best Birthday Ever, Charlie Brown, and I Want a Dog for Christmas, Charlie Brown with the latter eight being produced several years after he had disappeared from the comic strip. Shermy is mentioned briefly in the musical You're a Good Man, Charlie Brown in the song "The Doctor Is In," but does not appear or have a speaking part; and he makes appearances in three feature films, including A Boy Named Charlie Brown, as well as a cameo appearance in Snoopy Come Home.

Shermy is seen several times in The Charlie Brown and Snoopy Show and mentioned by name in Episode 13 from television (as seen on the "Go Snoopy Go!" DVD). Interestingly enough, despite being one of Charlie Brown's best friends, he was largely only seen hanging out or even interacting with Charlie Brown in It Was a Short Summer, Charlie Brown (although he is somewhat nicer than everyone else when he is quitting the baseball team in Charlie Brown's All-Stars, where he says, "Sorry, Charlie Brown, but I guess I'll quit too, I'm the kind who needs to win now and then. With you it's different. I think you get sort of a neurotic pleasure out of losing all the time," but that technically does not count) in which he tells Charlie Brown about the canoe race and tells him he only got a few feet from the dock, and then Charlie Brown talks to him at the boys' camp while they wonder who can beat the girls' camp in a challenge.

In the 2008 Peanuts Motion Comics videos, Shermy appears in a couple episodes, without dialogue, as well as WildBrain's Peanuts animations.

Shermy returned to the animated specials in the 2011 Direct-to-DVD Happiness Is A Warm Blanket, Charlie Brown, which includes a scene based on the very first Peanuts strip, where Shermy notes how much he hates Charlie Brown to Patty. He also plays a supporting role in the 2015 animated film The Peanuts Movie, where his last name is revealed to be Plepler. It is shown in the same movie that he has a younger sister, and there was no mention of one in the strips or TV specials.

=== Voiced by ===
- Chris Doran (1963, 1965)
- Gabrielle DeFaria Ritter (1966) (as Gail De Faria)
- Glenn Mendelson (1966)
- David Carey (1969)
- Ronald Hendrix (1977)
- Michael Dockery (1983)
- Carl Steven (1985)
- Jake Miner (2003)
- Jake D. Smith (2008–2009) (as Jake Smith)
- Andy Pessoa (2011)
- William Wunsch (2015) (as William "Alex" Wunsch)
- Will Bhaneja (2021–present)

== Final appearance ==
Shermy's last actual appearance in a Peanuts strip came on June 15, 1969. Schulz expressed no regrets at dropping Shermy from the cast, remarking many years later that it had gotten to the point by then where he used Shermy only in situations where he "needed a character with very little personality."
