= Pig-Pen =

Peanuts comic strip character

- Peanuts character
- Pig-Pen
- First appearance: July 13, 1954
- Last appearance: September 8, 1999 (comic strip)
- Voiced by: Various voice actors See below

In-universe information
- Gender: Male
- Family: Unnamed parents
- Nationality: American

Pig-Pen is a fictional character in the comic strip Peanuts by Charles M. Schulz, syndicated in daily and Sunday newspapers in numerous countries all over the world. While amiable, he is a young boy who is, except on rare occasions, extremely dirty and attracts a permanent cloud of dust.

== History ==
"Pig-Pen" is a nickname. In a 2000 Gallup Poll, Pig-Pen was found to be the fifth most popular Peanuts character. In strips up through 1980, Schulz spelled the character's name "Pig-Pen", with a hyphen; since 1981, the name has been spelled "Pigpen". He is also mocked by other characters because of his dirtiness.

Pig-Pen is known for his perpetually filthy overalls and the cloud of dirt and dust that surrounds him everywhere he goes. When he takes a deep breath (to sing, for example), the dust rises briefly around him. He has proudly referred to his personal cloud as "the dust of countless ages". He cannot seem to rid himself of the dust for more than the very briefest of periods — indeed, in spite of his best efforts, it appears that he cannot stay clean. He is referred to in an early strip as the only person who can get dirty while walking in a snowstorm. Nevertheless, on rare occasions he has briefly appeared clean, and hence unrecognizable. Once this was in order to impress Violet, of whom he was a bit fond. On another occasion (September 6, 1954), he managed to keep one side of his body clean and presented this clean side to Patty, causing her to believe that he was completely clean. In The Peanuts Movie (2015), Patty seems to have a crush on Pig-Pen and he seems to return these feelings.

Once, after bathing and dressing in clean clothes, Pig-Pen stepped outside his house and instantaneously became dirty and disheveled, whereupon he declared to Charlie Brown, "You know what I am? I'm a dust magnet!" On another occasion, Pig-Pen decided it was important to have clean hands, but after failing to wash them, realized that he had "reached a point of no return."

One notable exception is an earlier strip where he gets caught in a brief but heavy rainfall, and while trying to seek shelter, the storm ends, revealing him to be clean. He responds with disdain, stating that, "In one minute the rain has washed away what took me all day to accomplish".

Though Pig-Pen is proud of his uncleanliness, Charlie Brown is the only other Peanuts character to unconditionally accept Pig-Pen for who he is, even defending his uncleanliness in one strip (which was re-used in A Charlie Brown Christmas and Peanuts):

Don't think of it as dust. Just think of it as the dirt and dust of far-off lands blowing over here and settling on "Pig-Pen!" It staggers the imagination! He may be carrying the soil that was trod upon by Solomon or Nebuchadnezzar or Genghis Khan!

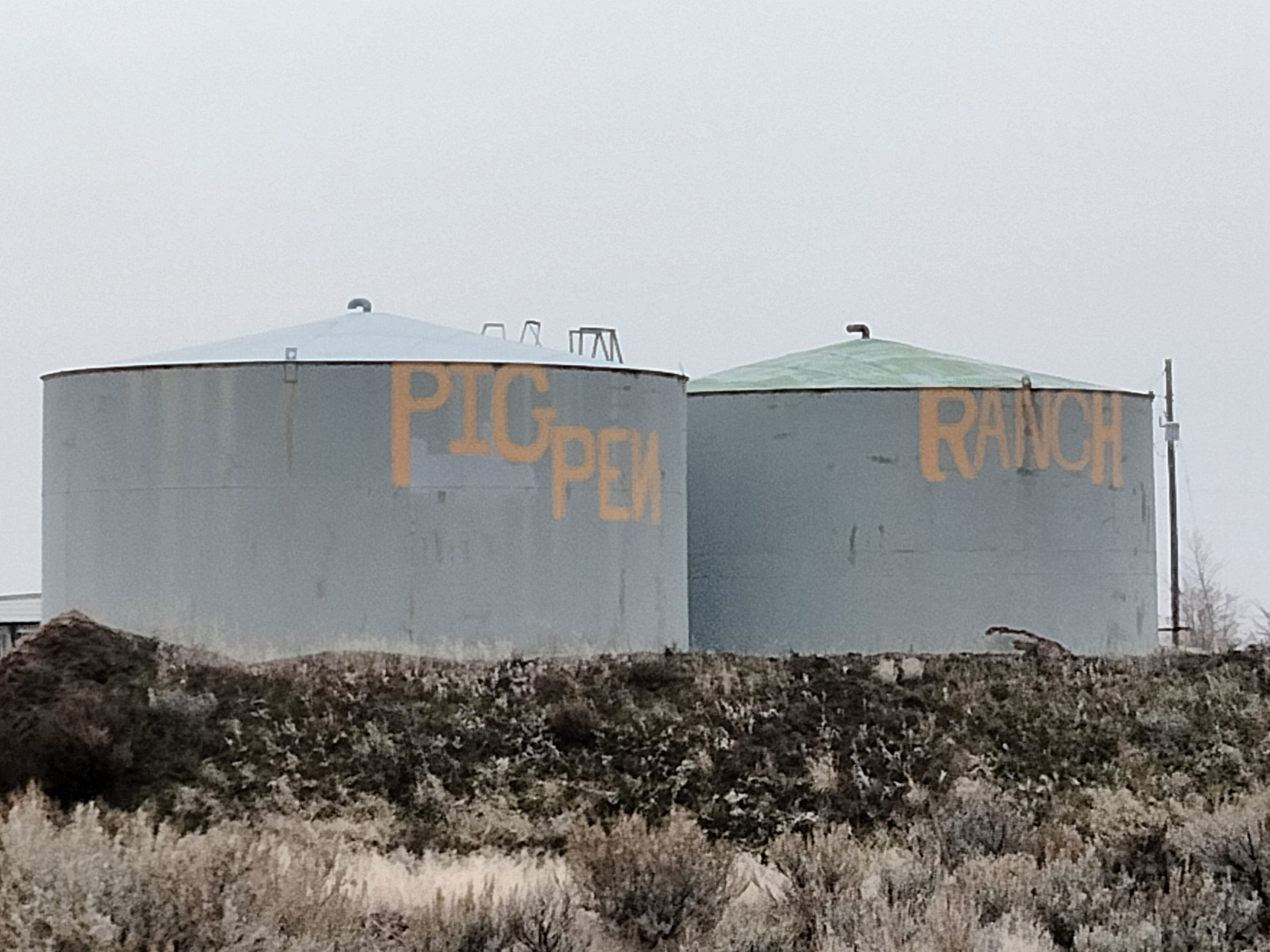
Pig Pen Ranch in Oasis, Idaho, immediately northwest of Red Baron Airport Airpark

Charles Schulz admitted that he came to regret Pig-Pen's popularity, given the character's essentially one-joke nature; he utilized the character very rarely in the later years of the strip's run; Pig-Pen was featured in just over 100 of the 17,897 Peanuts comic strips that Schulz created (though still appearing commonly in the TV specials and movies of the franchise). Like most of Schulz's characters, Pig-Pen has (both with and without lines) appeared in many of the animated Peanuts television specials beginning in the 1960s, as well as all five movies. One time, his clean self was shown in a miniseries titled This Is America, Charlie Brown, where he is an astronaut aboard a futuristic space station, demonstrating how personal hygiene would apply in zero gravity. True to form, the clean Pig-Pen is immediately dirtied again when dirt is attracted to him magnetically. In the 1990s, he appeared (in an animated overlay against a live-action backdrop) in a series of television commercials for Regina vacuum cleaners where all the dirt is sucked off his body and filthy trousers by one of the company's products, arguably one of the few times where Pig-Pen remains clean. In 2015, Pig-Pen appeared in a commercial for All laundry detergent for a tie-in with The Peanuts Movie. In the commercial, Snoopy, dressed as a magician, puts a cloth over Pig-Pen and instantly makes him clean, causing Snoopy to get dirty. This is also one of the few times where he remains clean.

Geoffrey Ornstein first voiced Pig-Pen in the 1965 television special A Charlie Brown Christmas. Although he also later played the role in Charlie Brown's All Stars!, other various actors have voiced him ever since.

He last appeared in the Peanuts comic strip on September 8, 1999.

Pig-Pen is evidently a talented musician, as he is shown playing the double bass, notably in A Charlie Brown Christmas, and later in the 1971 special Play It Again, Charlie Brown he easily takes to a set of drums brought out by Snoopy.

He plays third base on Charlie Brown's baseball team, and is likely the best player; in a March 1997 strip, when asked by Lucy why he doesn't look as neat as the others, he answers that his previous year's batting average was .712, adding "Neatness doesn't bat .712".

== Voiced by ==
- Geoffrey Ornstein (1963–1966)
- Gabrielle DeFaria Ritter (1966–1969)
- Christopher DeFaria (1969)
- Chris Inglis (1971)
- Tom Muller (1974)
- Carl Steven (1984–1986)
- Jacob Ferry (1994)
- Brandon Taylor (1997)
- Corey Padnos (2000)
- Jake Miner (2003)
- Shane Baumel (2011)
- A.J. Tecce (2015)
- Sage Correa (2016)
- Zach Atkinson (2018)
- Jacob Soley (2021–2023)
- Lucien Duncan-Reid (2023–present)
