= Lucy Van Pelt =

Peanuts comic strip character

- Peanuts character
- First appearance: March 3, 1952
- Last appearance: December 13, 1999 (comic strip)
- Created by: Charles Schulz
- Voiced by: Various voice actresses See below

In-universe information
- Gender: Female
- Family: Linus Van Pelt and Rerun Van Pelt (younger brothers); Unnamed blanket-hating grandmother; Unnamed parents; Marian (aunt); Felix Van Pelt (paternal grandfather)
- Nationality: American

Lucille "Lucy" Van Pelt is a fictional character in the syndicated comic strip Peanuts, written and drawn by Charles Schulz. She is the older sister of Linus and Rerun. Lucy is characterized as a "fussbudget", crabby, bossy and opinionated girl who bullies most other characters in the strip, particularly Linus and Charlie Brown.

== Personality ==
Lucy often mocks and intimidates others, especially Charlie Brown and her younger brother, Linus. She is often the antagonist in a number of the comics. She has moments of tenderness, such as when Linus replies to her despondency over the unfairness of life by saying "Well, for one thing, you have a little brother who loves you," whereupon Lucy hugs her little brother and bursts into tears.

She often torments, teases, and belittles Charlie Brown, but she is genuinely fond of him; their true friendship is obvious throughout the strip. In one storyline, where Linus and Lucy's family move away (temporarily, as it turned out), both Lucy and Charlie Brown become very emotional when they say goodbye to each other. In some strips, Charlie Brown gets the better of Lucy. In one, she lectures him about putting his hands in a bowl of popcorn that they're sharing after licking his fingers. The last panel of the strip shows him walking away from her as she sits there with a surprised expression on her face with the bowl of popcorn dumped on her head. Like her brother, she loves sinking into her bean bag chair.

Lucy has an unrequited crush on musical prodigy Schroeder, in part because Schroeder cares about nothing but Beethoven and playing the piano. Kevin Wong from the blog Kotaku wrote of the relationship: "Over the years, the reader empathized less with Schroeder and more with Lucy, even though she was the initial aggressor in this dysfunctional dynamic. At least she had some skin in the game—she opened herself to rejection every time she leaned on Schroeder’s piano. Schroeder was never open, and at times, he even seemed to take pleasure in his cruel reactions to her flirtations." By 1966, Lucy’s relationship with Schroeder bordered on masochistic. She persisted in her efforts to win him over, despite his indifference. During a multi-day, extended storyline during which Lucy and Linus moved away, Schroeder realized he missed her. He couldn’t play his piano without her there. Like Charlie Brown in the storyline, the reader is irritated at Schroeder for his prior callousness and emotional constipation.

=== Psychiatric booth ===
Lucy operates a psychiatric booth, parodying the lemonade stand operated by many young children in the United States. Here, she offers advice and psychoanalysis for five cents, most often to an anxious or depressed Charlie Brown; however, the "advice" is usually worthless. Her advice ranges from street smart popular psychology to hilarious obvious truths to insightful investigation. One example is when, while treating Snoopy, Lucy asks him how he related, during his childhood, to the other (if you allow the expression) "dogs" in his family. Needless to say, Snoopy was quick to disallow the expression. Another is when she asks him to give her his paw and recite to himself: "I am loved. I am needed. I am important." Snoopy reacts by thinking "I am blushing!" A sign on the front of the booth declares that "The Doctor is" in or out, depending on which side of the "In/out" placard is displayed. In A Charlie Brown Christmas, Lucy reverses the placard from displaying its "Out" side to reveal the words "Real In".

=== Baseball ===
On Charlie Brown's baseball team Lucy plays right field (or occasionally center field), and is characterized as a bad player, who, when temporarily kicked off the team, turns to heckling the games. Lucy has a knack for coming up with a nonsensical excuse for every fly ball she misses, such as "The moons of Saturn got in my eyes" or "I think there were toxic substances coming from my glove, and they made me dizzy." Other times, she finds an excuse to have one-sided conversations with Charlie Brown at the pitcher's mound, often over something trivial, which usually result in Charlie Brown blowing his top and yelling at her to "Get back in right field where you belong!"

== History ==
The third new character in Peanuts after Violet and Schroeder, Lucy made her debut on March 3, 1952. Originally based on Schulz's adopted daughter Meredith, Lucy was a goggle-eyed toddler who continually annoyed her parents and the older kids. Her future irascibility was hinted at in a 1953 strip when she tells Charlie Brown that she'd just been expelled from nursery school.

Over the next two years, she aged up so that by 1954, she appeared to be about the same age as Charlie Brown. (The early strips with toddler-age Lucy were not reprinted until after Charles Schulz's death.) Within a few months of her introduction, Schulz altered Lucy's eyes to have the same appearance as that of the other characters, except for small extra lines around them which were also later sported by her two siblings.

Lucy has short, black hair and wears a blue dress with blue socks and saddle shoes until the late 1970s when Schulz began showing the strip's female characters in pants and shirts in order to keep their outfits more contemporary. By the late 1980s, she had switched to this look permanently.

Lucy was named for Louanne Van Pelt (1929–2015), a former neighbor of Schulz in Colorado Springs, Colorado. According to David Michaelis of Time, she was modeled after Schulz's first wife, Joyce.

In a 1967 interview with Psychology Today, Schulz said his favorite characters were Snoopy, Linus, and Charlie Brown. "Lucy is not a favorite, because I don't especially like her, that's all. But she 'works', and a central comic-strip character is not only one who fills his role very well, but who will provide ideas by the very nature of his personality." Also in the article, Schulz added that Lucy was mean, because supposedly weak people dominating strong people is funny: "There is nothing funny about a little boy being mean to a little girl. That is simply not funny! But there is something funny about a little girl being able to be mean to a little boy ... You have to give (Lucy) credit though; she has a way of cutting right down to the truth. This is one of her good points. She can cut through a lot of the sham and she can really feel what's wrong with Charlie Brown which he can't see himself."

== Annual football strips ==
Lucy frequently pulls the football away from Charlie Brown right as he is about to kick it. The first occasion on which she did this was November 16, 1952. (Violet unintentionally did the same thing a year before because she was afraid Charlie Brown would accidentally kick her), Unlike subsequent stunts, Lucy first pulled the ball away because she did not want Charlie Brown to get it dirty (he took a second try in the same strip, only to trip over it at the end).

The football strips became an annual tradition, and Schulz did one nearly every year for the rest of the strip's run, becoming a core part of Peanuts lore. The most controversial example is in the animated special It's Your First Kiss, Charlie Brown. During an actual football game with many spectators, Lucy pulls the ball away on Charlie Brown four times keeping him from making any scoring plays and causing the team to lose the Homecoming game by one point. Although clearly innocent, he is blamed for the loss even by Lucy herself. In the Peanuts specials, this first happens in It's the Great Pumpkin, Charlie Brown. In A Charlie Brown Thanksgiving, Lucy says that "the biggest, most important tradition of all is the kicking off of the football", readying Charlie Brown to kick the football before she once again pulls it out from under him.

Charlie Brown did in fact manage to kick the football a few times. For example, he did in the September 12, 1956 strip, but only because Schroeder was holding the ball. In a special It's Magic, Charlie Brown when Snoopy turned Charlie Brown invisible, he was able to kick the football while Lucy was practicing her teeing, and never noticed him until he kicked the ball.

In a July–August 1979 story when Charlie Brown checked himself into the hospital due to feeling ill, Lucy was so distraught at Charlie Brown in that state that she vowed that she would let Charlie Brown kick the football. When Charlie Brown was released, he kept her to that vow. Unfortunately, when he made his place kick, he missed the ball and hit her hand instead.

== Voiced by ==
- Karen Mendelson (1963)
- Tracy Stratford (1963, 1965)
- Sally Dryer (1966–1968)
- Pamelyn Ferdin (1969–1971)
- Robin Kohn (1972–1973)
- Melanie Kohn (1974–1975, 1977)
- Sarah Beach (1976)
- Lynn Mortensen (1976)
- Michelle Muller (1977–1979)
- Laura Planting (1980)
- Kristen Fullerton (1980)
- Sydney Penny (1981)
- Angela Lee (1983)
- Heather Stoneman (1984–1985)
- Jessica Lee Smith (1984–1985)
- Melissa Guzzi (1986)
- Tiffany Billings (1986–1988)
- Ami Foster (1988)
- Erica Gayle (1988–1989)
- Jennifer Banko (1990)
- Marne Patterson (1992)
- Molly Dunham (1993)
- Jamie Cronin (1995–1997)
- Rachel Davey (2000)
- Lauren Schaffel (2002)
- Serena Berman (2002–2003)
- Ashley Rose Orr (2003)
- Stephanie Patton (2006)
- Michelle Creber (2008–2009)
- Grace Rolek (2011)
- Scarlett Sperduto (2012–2013; Metlife Commercials)
- Hadley Belle Miller (2015)
- Bella Stine (2016)
- Merrit Grove (2018–2019)
- Isabella Leo (2019–2025)
- Jo-Hannah Atchison (2026–present)
