= Linus Van Pelt =

Peanuts comic strip character

- Peanuts character
- First appearance: Peanuts; July 14, 1952 September 19, 1952 (debut)
- Last appearance: February 13, 2000 (comic strip)
- Created by: Charles M. Schulz
- Voiced by: Various voice actors See below

In-universe information
- Gender: Male
- Family: Rerun Van Pelt (younger brother); Lucy Van Pelt (older sister); Unnamed blanket-hating grandmother; Unnamed parents; Marian (aunt); Felix Van Pelt (paternal grandfather)
- Nationality: American

Linus Van Pelt is a fictional character in Charles M. Schulz’s comic strip Peanuts. He is the best friend of Charlie Brown, the younger brother of Lucy Van Pelt, and the older brother of Rerun Van Pelt. His first appearance was on September 19, 1952, but he was not mentioned by name until three days later. He was first referred to two months earlier, on July 14. Linus spoke his first words in 1954, the same year he was first shown with his security blanket. Linus is named after Schulz's friend Linus Maurer.

The character's creator, Charles M. Schulz, said of the character, "Linus, my serious side, is the house intellectual; bright, well-informed which, I suppose, may contribute to his feelings of insecurity." Lee Mendelson, producer of the majority of the Peanuts television specials, has said that Linus is his favorite character: "He made sucking your thumb and holding a security blanket OK. I think he's one of the most original fictional characters of all time—blending childish behavior with great wisdom."

== Personality ==
Though young, Linus is intelligent and wise and acts as the strip's philosopher and theologian, often quoting the Gospels. He generally plays second base on the Peanuts gang's baseball team.

Juvenile aspects of his character are also displayed; for example, Linus is almost always depicted holding his blue security blanket, for which he is often mocked by other characters, and he often sucks his thumb. Linus is the only member of his group who believes in the Great Pumpkin, an alternative Santa Claus–like figure who, according to Linus, appears every Halloween, arising from the most "sincere" pumpkin patch and bearing gifts. He occasionally temporarily convinced other characters that the Great Pumpkin is real, only to stubbornly maintain his faith when they lose theirs.

In the strip from June 9, 1986, Linus claims that his birthday is in October. However, Lucy gives him a chair for his birthday in the November 22, 1964, Sunday news-strip cartoon.

== Appearance ==
Linus has brown hair and hazel eyes and normally wears a red striped shirt, black shorts, red socks, and dark brown tennis shoes. On February 5, 1962, Linus began wearing eyeglasses after being diagnosed with myopia; however, after the Sunday strip of September 9, 1962, the glasses were not seen again. In an earlier strip of July 17, 1962, Linus had told Charlie Brown that his ophthalmologist said that he may not have to wear his glasses all the time, which thus explains their eventual disappearance. In a 1985 interview, Schulz said he stopped putting glasses on Linus because it interfered with his expression lines.

== Relationships ==
Linus looked for an opening to knock out Lucy in a boxing match, but...

...Linus is the loser as Lucy landed the knockout punch instead.

Linus's older sister Lucy often bullies him, to which he responds by either giving in or taking revenge. He is Charlie Brown's best friend; Linus became sympathetic towards Charlie Brown and often gave him advice after listening to Charlie Brown's various insecurities.

Upon the introduction of Charlie Brown's little sister, Sally Brown, in 1959, Linus had the desire to marry her. As the strip progressed, he outgrew this idea and rejects her overtures relentlessly (albeit less harshly than Schroeder does to Lucy and less confusedly than Charlie Brown does to Peppermint Patty). Meanwhile, Sally proceeded to fall in love with Linus, often calling him her "Sweet Babboo", much to his displeasure. Linus, in turn, has a crush on his school teacher, Miss Othmar.

== Voiced by ==
- Christopher Shea (1965–1968)
- Glenn Gilger (1969)
- Stephen Shea (1971–1975)
- Liam Martin (1975–1977)
- Daniel Anderson (1977–1980)
- Rocky Reilly (1980–1983)
- Jeremy Schoenberg (1983–1985)
- David T. Wagner (1984–1985)
- Jeremy Miller (1985–1988)
- Brandon Stewart (1988–1990)
- Josh Keaton (1991)
- John Christian Graas (1992, 1994)
- Anthony Burch (1995–1997)
- Corey Padnos (2000–2003)
- Benjamin Bryan (2006)
- Quinn Lord (2008–2009)
- Tyler Kohanek (2009)
- Austin Lux (2011)
- Alexander Garfin (2015)
- Jude Perry (2016)
- Felix Helden (2018–2019)
- Wyatt White (2019–2025)
- Athan Giazitzidis (2026–present)
