= List of programs previously broadcast by CBS =

This is a list of television programs once broadcast by the American television network CBS that have ended their runs on the network.

== Drama ==
Title	Premiere date	Finale	Notes	Seasons
Studio One	November 7, 1948	September 29, 1958		10
City Hospital	March 25, 1952	October 1, 1953		1
The Public Defender	March 11, 1954	June 23, 1955		1
The Telltale Clue	July 8, 1954	September 23, 1954		1
Lassie	September 12, 1954	March 8, 1971	Seasons 1–17 only Moved to first-run syndication for Seasons 18–19	17
Climax!	October 7, 1954	June 26, 1958		4
Gunsmoke	September 7, 1955	March 31, 1975		20
Alfred Hitchcock Presents	October 2, 1955	July 3, 1964	Seasons 1–5, 8–9 only Moved to NBC for seasons 6–7, 10	7
The 20th Century Fox Hour	October 5, 1955	June 12, 1957		2
Have Gun – Will Travel	September 14, 1957	April 20, 1963		6
Perry Mason	September 21, 1957	May 22, 1966		9
Armstrong Circle Theatre	November 27, 1957	June 5, 1963	Seasons 8–14 only Seasons 1–7 aired on NBC	7
Wanted Dead or Alive	September 6, 1958	March 29, 1961		3
The Texan	September 29, 1958	September 19, 1960		2
Yancy Derringer	October 2, 1958	June 4, 1959		1
Rawhide	January 9, 1959	December 7, 1965		8
Hotel de Paree	October 2, 1959	June 3, 1960		1
The Twilight Zone	October 2, 1959	June 19, 1964		5
Mr. Lucky	October 14, 1959	June 18, 1960		1
Diagnosis: Unknown	July 5, 1960	September 20, 1960		1
Route 66	October 7, 1960	March 20, 1964		4
The Defenders	September 16, 1961	May 13, 1965		4
Window on Main Street	October 2, 1961	May 23, 1962		1
The Investigators	October 5, 1961	December 28, 1961		1
The Lloyd Bridges Show	September 11, 1962	May 28, 1963		1
The Alfred Hitchcock Hour	September 20, 1962	July 3, 1964	Seasons 1–2 only Moved to NBC for season 3	2
The Nurses	September 27, 1962	May 11, 1965	Renamed The Doctors and the Nurses on September 26, 1963	3
Vacation Playhouse	July 22, 1963	August 28, 1967		5
For the People	January 31, 1965	May 9, 1965		1
Our Private World	May 5, 1965	September 10, 1965		1
Lost in Space	September 15, 1965	March 6, 1968		3
The Wild Wild West	September 17, 1965	April 4, 1969		4
The Loner	September 18, 1965	March 12, 1966		1
Daktari	January 11, 1966	January 15, 1969		4
Jericho	September 15, 1966	January 19, 1967		1
Mission: Impossible	September 17, 1966	March 30, 1973		7
Coronet Blue	May 29, 1967	September 4, 1967		1
Cimarron Strip	September 7, 1967	March 7, 1968		1
Gentle Ben	September 10, 1967	August 31, 1969		2
Mannix	September 16, 1967	April 13, 1975		8
The Prisoner	June 1, 1968	September 21, 1968		1
Premiere	July 1, 1968	September 9, 1968		1
Hawaii Five-O	September 20, 1968	April 5, 1980		12
Lancer	September 24, 1968	June 23, 1970		2
Medical Center	September 24, 1969	September 6, 1976		7
Storefront Lawyers	September 16, 1970	April 14, 1971	Renamed Men at Law on February 3, 1971	1
Cannon	September 14, 1971	March 3, 1976		5
Bearcats!	September 16, 1971	December 30, 1971		1
O'Hara, U.S. Treasury	September 17, 1971	March 10, 1972		1
Cade's County	September 19, 1971	April 9, 1972		1
The Waltons	September 14, 1972	June 4, 1981		9
Barnaby Jones	January 28, 1973	April 3, 1980		8
The New Perry Mason	September 16, 1973	January 20, 1974		1
Hawkins	October 2, 1973	September 3, 1974		1
Shaft	October 9, 1973	February 19, 1974		1
Kojak	October 24, 1973	March 18, 1978		5
Apple's Way	February 10, 1974	January 12, 1975		2
Sons and Daughters	September 11, 1974	November 6, 1974		1
Planet of the Apes	September 13, 1974	December 20, 1974		1
Switch	September 9, 1975	August 20, 1978		3
Kate McShane	September 10, 1975	November 12, 1975		1
Three for the Road	September 14, 1975	November 30, 1975		1
The Blue Knight	December 10, 1975	October 20, 1976		2
Sara	February 13, 1976	May 7, 1976		1
Delvecchio	September 9, 1976	March 13, 1977		1
Spencer's Pilots	September 17, 1976	November 19, 1976		1
Executive Suite	September 20, 1976	February 11, 1977		1
Code R	January 21, 1977	June 10, 1977		1
The Andros Targets	January 31, 1977	May 16, 1977		1
Hunter	February 18, 1977	May 27, 1977		1
Nashville 99	April 1, 1977	April 22, 1977		1
The Fitzpatricks	September 5, 1977	January 10, 1978		1
Rafferty	September 5, 1977	November 28, 1977		1
Logan's Run	September 16, 1977	February 6, 1978		1
The New Adventures of Wonder Woman	September 16, 1977	September 11, 1979	Seasons 2–3 only Season 1 aired on ABC	2
The Amazing Spider-Man	September 19, 1977	July 6, 1979		2
Lou Grant	September 20, 1977	September 13, 1982		5
The Incredible Hulk	March 10, 1978	May 12, 1982		5
Dallas	April 2, 1978	May 3, 1991		14
The Paper Chase	September 9, 1978	April 24, 1979	Season 1 only Moved to Showtime for seasons 2–4	1
Kaz	September 10, 1978	April 22, 1979		1
The American Girls	September 23, 1978	November 11, 1978		1
The White Shadow	September 27, 1978	March 16, 1981		3
The Dukes of Hazzard	January 26, 1979	February 8, 1985		7
Trapper John, M.D.	September 23, 1979	September 4, 1986		7
California Fever	September 25, 1979	December 11, 1979		1
Big Shamus, Little Shamus	September 29, 1979	October 6, 1979		1
Paris	September 29, 1979	January 15, 1980		1
Salem's Lot	November 17, 1979	November 24, 1979	Miniseries	1
Young Maverick	November 28, 1979	January 30, 1980		1
Knots Landing	December 27, 1979	May 13, 1993		14
Scruples	February 25, 1980	February 27, 1980	Miniseries	1
Hagen	March 15, 1980	April 24, 1980		1
Palmerstown, U.S.A.	March 20, 1980	June 9, 1981	Renamed Palmerstown on March 17, 1981	2
Enos	November 12, 1980	May 20, 1981		1
Secrets of Midland Heights	December 6, 1980	January 24, 1981		1
Magnum, P.I.	December 11, 1980	May 8, 1988		8
Riker	March 14, 1981	April 11, 1981		1
Nurse	April 2, 1981	May 21, 1982		2
Jessica Novak	November 5, 1981	November 26, 1981		1
Shannon	November 11, 1981	April 7, 1982		1
Simon & Simon	November 24, 1981	December 31, 1988		8
Falcon Crest	December 4, 1981	May 17, 1990		9
Q.E.D.	March 23, 1982	April 27, 1982		1
Cagney & Lacey	March 25, 1982	May 16, 1988		7
Seven Brides for Seven Brothers	September 19, 1982	March 23, 1983		1
Bring 'Em Back Alive	September 24, 1982	May 31, 1983		1
Tucker's Witch	October 6, 1982	June 9, 1983		1
Wizards and Warriors	February 26, 1983	May 14, 1983		1
The Mississippi	March 25, 1983	March 6, 1984		1
Zorro and Son	April 6, 1983	June 1, 1983		1
Emerald Point N.A.S.	September 26, 1983	March 12, 1984		1
Cutter to Houston	October 1, 1983	December 31, 1983		1
Scarecrow and Mrs. King	October 3, 1983	May 28, 1987		4
Whiz Kids	October 5, 1983	June 2, 1984		1
Airwolf	January 22, 1984	March 29, 1986	Seasons 1–3 only Moved to USA Network for season 4	3
Mickey Spillane's Mike Hammer	January 28, 1984	May 13, 1987	Renamed The New Mike Hammer on September 22, 1986	3
George Washington	April 8, 1984	April 11, 1984	Miniseries	1
Cover Up	September 22, 1984	April 6, 1985		1
Murder, She Wrote	September 30, 1984	May 19, 1996		12
Crazy Like a Fox	December 30, 1984	May 3, 1986		2
Otherworld	January 26, 1985	March 16, 1985		1
Detective in the House	March 15, 1985	April 19, 1985		1
Space	April 14, 1985	April 18, 1985	Miniseries	1
Hometown	August 22, 1985	October 15, 1985		1
The Equalizer	September 18, 1985	August 24, 1989		4
T. J. Hooker	September 25, 1985	June 28, 1986	Season 5 only Seasons 1–4 aired on ABC	1
The Twilight Zone	September 27, 1985	July 17, 1987	Seasons 1–2 only Moved to first-run syndication for season 3	2
Bridges to Cross	April 24, 1986	June 12, 1986		1
The Wizard	September 9, 1986	March 12, 1987		1
George Washington II: The Forging of a Nation	September 21, 1986	September 22, 1986	Miniseries	1
Kay O'Brien	September 25, 1986	November 13, 1986		1
Downtown	September 27, 1986	April 22, 1987		1
Echoes in the Darkness	November 1, 1986	November 2, 1986	Miniseries	1
Fresno	November 16, 1986	November 20, 1986	Miniseries	1
Shell Game	January 8, 1987	February 12, 1987		1
I'll Take Manhattan	March 1, 1987	March 22, 1987	Miniseries	1
Spies	March 2, 1987	April 14, 1987		1
Houston Knights	March 11, 1987	June 10, 1988		2
CBS Summer Playhouse	June 12, 1987	August 22, 1989		3
The Oldest Rookie	September 16, 1987	January 13, 1988		1
Wiseguy	September 16, 1987	December 8, 1990		4
Tour of Duty	September 24, 1987	April 28, 1990		3
Beauty and the Beast	September 25, 1987	August 4, 1990		3
Jake and the Fatman	September 26, 1987	May 6, 1992		5
The Law & Harry McGraw	September 27, 1987	February 10, 1988		1
Leg Work	October 3, 1987	November 7, 1987		1
High Mountain Rangers	January 2, 1988	April 9, 1988		1
Blue Skies	June 13, 1988	August 1, 1988		1
Paradise	October 27, 1988	May 10, 1991	Renamed Guns of Paradise on January 4, 1991	3
Dirty Dancing	October 29, 1988	January 21, 1989		1
Almost Grown	November 27, 1988	February 20, 1989		1
TV 101	November 29, 1988	March 25, 1989		1
Dolphin Cove	January 21, 1989	March 11, 1989		1
Lonesome Dove	February 5, 1989	February 8, 1989	Miniseries	1
Hard Time on Planet Earth	March 1, 1989	June 21, 1989		1
Rescue 911	April 18, 1989	August 27, 1996		7
Jesse Hawkes	April 22, 1989	May 27, 1989		1
Wolf	September 13, 1989	June 28, 1990		1
Island Son	September 16, 1989	March 15, 1990		1
Peaceable Kingdom	September 20, 1989	November 15, 1990		1
Top of the Hill	September 21, 1989	November 30, 1989		1
Snoops	September 22, 1989	July 6, 1990		1
Max Monroe: Loose Cannon	January 5, 1990	April 19, 1990		1
Grand Slam	January 28, 1990	March 14, 1990		1
The Bradys	February 9, 1990	March 9, 1990		1
Northern Exposure	July 12, 1990	July 26, 1995		6
E.A.R.T.H. Force	September 16, 1990	September 29, 1990		1
The Trials of Rosie O'Neill	September 17, 1990	May 30, 1992		2
The Flash	September 20, 1990	May 18, 1991		1
WIOU	October 24, 1990	March 20, 1991		1
Over My Dead Body	November 2, 1990	June 20, 1991		1
Broken Badges	November 24, 1990	June 20, 1991		1
Sons and Daughters	January 4, 1991	March 1, 1991		1
The Antagonists	March 21, 1991	May 30, 1991		1
Dark Justice	April 5, 1991	September 28, 1993		3
Sweating Bullets	April 8, 1991	October 18, 1993		3
Golden Years	July 16, 1991	August 22, 1991	Miniseries	1
P.S. I Luv U	September 15, 1991	January 4, 1992		1
Palace Guard	October 18, 1991	November 1, 1991		1
Silk Stalkings	November 7, 1991	June 10, 1993	Seasons 1–2 only Moved to USA Network for seasons 3–8	2
Hearts Are Wild	January 10, 1992	March 13, 1992		1
Tequila and Bonetti	January 17, 1992	April 18, 1992		1
The Human Factor	April 16, 1992	May 28, 1992		1
Intruders	May 17, 1992	May 19, 1992	Miniseries	1
Raven	June 19, 1992	April 30, 1993		2
2000 Malibu Road	August 23, 1992	September 9, 1992		1
Middle Ages	September 3, 1992	October 1, 1992		1
Angel Street	September 15, 1992	October 3, 1992		1
The Hat Squad	September 16, 1992	January 23, 1993		1
Picket Fences	September 18, 1992	June 26, 1996		4
In the Heat of the Night	October 28, 1992	May 16, 1995	Seasons 6–7 only Seasons 1–5 aired on NBC	2
Sinatra	November 8, 1992	November 9, 1992	Miniseries	1
Dr. Quinn, Medicine Woman	January 1, 1993	May 16, 1998		6
Walker, Texas Ranger	April 21, 1993	May 19, 2001		9
Angel Falls	August 26, 1993	September 30, 1993		1
Harts of the West	September 25, 1993	June 18, 1994		1
Diagnosis: Murder	September 29, 1993	May 11, 2001		8
South of Sunset	October 27, 1993			1
Return to Lonesome Dove	November 14, 1993	November 17, 1993	Miniseries	1
Second Chances	December 2, 1993	February 19, 1994		1
Burke's Law	January 7, 1994	July 28, 1995		2
The Road Home	March 5, 1994	April 16, 1994		1
Christy	April 3, 1994	August 2, 1995		2
Due South	April 26, 1994	May 15, 1996	Seasons 1–2 only Moved to CTV for seasons 3–4	2
Hotel Malibu	August 4, 1994	September 8, 1994		1
One West Waikiki	August 4, 1994	May 25, 1996		2
Under Suspicion	September 16, 1994	March 10, 1995		1
Chicago Hope	September 18, 1994	May 4, 2000		6
Touched by an Angel	September 21, 1994	April 27, 2003		9
Under One Roof	March 14, 1995	April 18, 1995		1
Central Park West	September 13, 1995	June 28, 1996		1
Courthouse	September 13, 1995	November 15, 1995		1
The Client	September 17, 1995	April 16, 1996		1
American Gothic	September 22, 1995	July 11, 1996		1
New York News	September 28, 1995	November 30, 1995		1
Streets of Laredo	November 12, 1995	November 14, 1995	Miniseries	1
Nash Bridges	March 29, 1996	May 4, 2001		6
Undue Influence	September 15, 1996	September 17, 1996	Miniseries	1
Promised Land	September 17, 1996	May 20, 1999		3
Moloney	September 19, 1996	May 22, 1997		1
Mr. & Mrs. Smith	September 20, 1996	November 8, 1996		1
Early Edition	September 28, 1996	May 27, 2000		4
EZ Streets	October 27, 1996	April 2, 1997		1
Titanic	November 17, 1996	November 19, 1996	Miniseries	1
JAG	January 3, 1997	April 29, 2005	Seasons 2–10 only Season 1 aired on NBC	9
Orleans	January 7, 1997	April 10, 1997		1
Feds	March 5, 1997	April 9, 1997		1
The Last Don	May 11, 1997	May 14, 1997	Miniseries	1
Brooklyn South	September 22, 1997	April 29, 1998		1
Dellaventura	September 23, 1997	January 13, 1998		1
The Magnificent Seven	January 3, 1998	July 3, 2000		2
L.A. Doctors	September 21, 1998	May 10, 1999		1
Buddy Faro	September 25, 1998	December 4, 1998		1
Martial Law	September 26, 1998	May 13, 2000		2
To Have & to Hold	September 30, 1998	December 9, 1998		1
Turks	January 21, 1999	April 23, 1999		1
Sons of Thunder	March 9, 1999	April 17, 1999		1
Judging Amy	September 19, 1999	May 3, 2005		6
Family Law	September 20, 1999	May 27, 2002		3
Now and Again	September 24, 1999	May 5, 2000		1
City of Angels	January 16, 2000	December 21, 2000		2
That's Life	October 1, 2000	January 26, 2002		2
CSI: Crime Scene Investigation	October 6, 2000	September 27, 2015		15
The Fugitive	October 6, 2000	May 25, 2001		1
The District	October 7, 2000	May 21, 2004		4
Kate Brasher	February 24, 2001	April 14, 2001		1
Big Apple	March 1, 2001	April 19, 2001		1
Wolf Lake	September 19, 2001	October 24, 2001		1
The Education of Max Bickford	September 23, 2001	June 2, 2002		1
The Guardian	September 25, 2001	May 4, 2004		3
The Agency	September 27, 2001	May 17, 2003		2
Citizen Baines	September 29, 2001	November 3, 2001		1
First Monday	January 15, 2002	May 3, 2002		1
CSI: Miami	September 23, 2002	April 8, 2012		10
Presidio Med	September 24, 2002	January 24, 2003		1
Without a Trace	September 26, 2002	May 19, 2009		7
Hack	September 27, 2002	March 13, 2004		2
Robbery Homicide Division	September 27, 2002	December 7, 2002		1
Queens Supreme	January 10, 2003	January 24, 2003		1
The Brotherhood of Poland, New Hampshire	September 24, 2003	November 19, 2003		1
Joan of Arcadia	September 26, 2003	April 22, 2005		2
Cold Case	September 28, 2003	May 2, 2010		7
Century City	March 16, 2004	March 30, 2004		1
CSI: NY	September 22, 2004	February 22, 2013		9
Dr. Vegas	September 24, 2004	October 29, 2004		1
Clubhouse	September 26, 2004	November 6, 2004		1
NUMB3RS	January 23, 2005	March 12, 2010		6
Elvis	May 8, 2005	May 11, 2005	Miniseries	1
Threshold	September 16, 2005	November 22, 2005		1
Criminal Minds	September 22, 2005	February 19, 2020	Seasons 1–15 only Moved to Paramount+ for season 16–present	15
Ghost Whisperer	September 23, 2005	May 21, 2010		5
Close to Home	October 4, 2005	May 11, 2007		2
Love Monkey	January 17, 2006	February 7, 2006		1
The Unit	March 7, 2006	May 10, 2009		4
Smith	September 19, 2006	October 3, 2006		1
Jericho	September 20, 2006	March 25, 2008		2
Shark	September 21, 2006	May 20, 2008		2
3 lbs	November 14, 2006	November 28, 2006		1
Cane	September 25, 2007	December 18, 2007		1
Moonlight	September 28, 2007	May 16, 2008		1
Viva Laughlin	October 18, 2007	October 21, 2007		1
Comanche Moon	January 13, 2008	January 16, 2008	Miniseries	1
Swingtown	June 5, 2008	September 5, 2008		1
Flashpoint	July 11, 2008	August 19, 2011	Seasons 1–4 only Moved to Ion Television for season 5	4
The Mentalist	September 23, 2008	February 18, 2015		7
The Ex List	October 3, 2008	October 24, 2008		1
Eleventh Hour	October 9, 2008	April 2, 2009		1
Harper's Island	April 9, 2009	July 11, 2009		1
NCIS: Los Angeles	September 22, 2009	May 21, 2023		14
The Good Wife	September 22, 2009	May 8, 2016		7
Medium	September 25, 2009	January 21, 2011	Seasons 6–7 only Seasons 1–5 aired on NBC	2
Three Rivers	October 4, 2009	July 3, 2010		1
Miami Medical	April 2, 2010	July 2, 2010		1
Hawaii Five-0	September 20, 2010	April 3, 2020		10
The Defenders	September 22, 2010	March 11, 2011		1
Blue Bloods	September 24, 2010	December 13, 2024		14
Criminal Minds: Suspect Behavior	February 16, 2011	May 25, 2011		1
CHAOS	April 1, 2011	July 16, 2011		1
Unforgettable	September 20, 2011	September 14, 2014	Seasons 1–3 only Moved to A&E for season 4	3
Person of Interest	September 22, 2011	June 21, 2016		5
A Gifted Man	September 23, 2011	March 2, 2012		1
NYC 22	April 15, 2012	August 11, 2012		1
Vegas	September 25, 2012	May 10, 2013		1
Elementary	September 27, 2012	August 15, 2019		7
Made in Jersey	September 28, 2012	December 29, 2012		1
Golden Boy	February 26, 2013	May 14, 2013		1
Under the Dome	June 24, 2013	September 10, 2015		3
Hostages	September 23, 2013	January 6, 2014		1
Intelligence	January 7, 2014	March 31, 2014		1
Reckless	June 29, 2014	September 13, 2014		1
Extant	July 9, 2014	September 9, 2015		2
Madam Secretary	September 21, 2014	December 8, 2019		6
Scorpion	September 22, 2014	April 16, 2018		4
NCIS: New Orleans	September 23, 2014	May 23, 2021		7
Stalker	October 1, 2014	May 18, 2015		1
Battle Creek	March 1, 2015	May 24, 2015		1
CSI: Cyber	March 4, 2015	March 13, 2016		2
Zoo	June 30, 2015	September 21, 2017		3
Limitless	September 22, 2015	April 26, 2016		1
Code Black	September 30, 2015	July 18, 2018		3
Supergirl	October 26, 2015	April 18, 2016	Season 1 only Moved to The CW for seasons 2–6	1
Criminal Minds: Beyond Borders	March 16, 2016	May 17, 2017		2
Rush Hour	March 31, 2016	August 20, 2016		1
BrainDead	June 13, 2016	September 11, 2016		1
American Gothic	June 22, 2016	September 7, 2016		1
Bull	September 20, 2016	May 26, 2022		6
MacGyver	September 23, 2016	April 30, 2021		5
Pure Genius	October 27, 2016	January 26, 2017		1
Ransom	January 1, 2017	May 25, 2019		3
Training Day	February 2, 2017	May 20, 2017		1
Doubt	February 15, 2017	August 12, 2017		1
Salvation	July 12, 2017	September 17, 2018		2
SEAL Team	September 27, 2017	October 31, 2021	Seasons 1–5A only Moved to Paramount+ for seasons 5B–7	5
Wisdom of the Crowd	October 1, 2017	January 14, 2018		1
S.W.A.T.	November 2, 2017	May 16, 2025		8
Instinct	March 18, 2018	August 25, 2019		2
Magnum P.I.	September 24, 2018	May 6, 2022	Seasons 1–4 only Moved to NBC for season 5	4
God Friended Me	September 30, 2018	April 26, 2020		2
The Code	April 9, 2019	July 22, 2019		1
The Red Line	April 28, 2019	May 19, 2019		1
Blood & Treasure	May 21, 2019	August 6, 2019	Season 1 only Moved to Paramount+ for season 2	1
All Rise	September 23, 2019	May 24, 2021	Seasons 1–2 only Moved to OWN for season 3	2
Evil	September 26, 2019	January 30, 2020	Season 1 only Moved to Paramount+ for seasons 2–4	1
FBI: Most Wanted	January 7, 2020	May 20, 2025		6
Tommy	February 6, 2020	May 7, 2020		1
Manhunt: Deadly Games	September 21, 2020	November 7, 2020		1
The Equalizer	February 7, 2021	May 4, 2025		5
Clarice	February 11, 2021	June 24, 2021		1
NCIS: Hawaiʻi	September 20, 2021	May 6, 2024		3
FBI: International	September 21, 2021	May 20, 2025		4
CSI: Vegas	October 6, 2021	May 19, 2024		3
Good Sam	January 5, 2022	May 4, 2022		1
So Help Me Todd	September 29, 2022	May 16, 2024		2
East New York	October 2, 2022	May 14, 2023		1
True Lies	March 1, 2023	May 17, 2023		1
Watson	January 26, 2025	May 3, 2026		2

== Comedy ==
Title	Premiere date	Finale	Notes	Seasons
Detective's Wife	July 7, 1950	September 29, 1950		1
The George Burns and Gracie Allen Show	October 12, 1950	September 15, 1958		8
The Jack Benny Program	October 28, 1950	April 21, 1964	Seasons 1–14 only Moved to NBC for season 15	14
I Love Lucy	October 15, 1951	May 6, 1957		6
My Little Margie	May 16, 1952	July 23, 1953	Seasons 1–2 only Moved to NBC for seasons 3–4	2
Our Miss Brooks	October 3, 1952	May 11, 1956		4
Private Secretary	February 1, 1953	March 17, 1957		5
Willy	September 18, 1954	June 16, 1955		1
Father Knows Best	October 3, 1954	May 23, 1960	Seasons 1, 5–6 only Moved to NBC for seasons 2–4	3
December Bride	October 4, 1954	May 7, 1959		5
Ethel and Albert	June 20, 1955	September 26, 1955	Season 3 only Seasons 1–2 aired on NBC; Moved to ABC for season 4	1
It's Always Jan	September 10, 1955	April 28, 1956		1
The Phil Silvers Show	September 20, 1955	September 11, 1959		4
The Bob Cummings Show	September 22, 1955	June 6, 1957	Seasons 2–3 only Seasons 1, 4–5 aired on NBC	2
The Honeymooners	October 4, 1955	September 22, 1956		1
Hey, Jeannie!	September 8, 1956	March 16, 1957	Season 1 only Moved to first-run syndication for season 2	1
Mr. Adams and Eve	January 4, 1957	July 8, 1958		2
Bachelor Father	September 15, 1957	June 7, 1959	Seasons 1–2 only Moved to NBC for Seasons 3–4 and ABC for season 5	2
The Eve Arden Show	September 17, 1957	March 25, 1958		1
Leave It to Beaver	October 4, 1957	July 16, 1958	Season 1 only Moved to ABC for seasons 2–6	1
The Danny Thomas Show	October 7, 1957	April 27, 1964	Seasons 5–11 only Seasons 1–4 aired on ABC	7
The Lucy–Desi Comedy Hour	November 28, 1957	April 1, 1960		3
The Ann Sothern Show	October 6, 1958	March 30, 1961		3
Hennesey	September 28, 1959	September 17, 1962		3
The Many Loves of Dobie Gillis	September 29, 1959	June 5, 1963		4
The Betty Hutton Show	October 1, 1959	June 30, 1960		1
Dennis the Menace	October 4, 1959	July 7, 1963		4
The Comedy Spot	June 28, 1960	September 18, 1962	Renamed Comedy Spotlight on July 25, 1961	3
New Comedy Showcase	August 1, 1960	September 19, 1960		1
Pete and Gladys	September 18, 1960	September 10, 1962		2
The Tom Ewell Show	September 22, 1960	May 23, 1961		1
The Andy Griffith Show	October 3, 1960	April 1, 1968		8
My Sister Eileen	October 5, 1960	April 12, 1961		1
Angel	October 6, 1960	June 14, 1961		1
Bringing Up Buddy	October 10, 1960	June 28, 1961		1
'Way Out	March 31, 1961	July 14, 1961		1
Ichabod and Me	September 26, 1961	June 5, 1962		1
Father of the Bride	September 29, 1961	May 25, 1962		1
Mister Ed	October 1, 1961	February 6, 1966	Seasons 2–6 only Season 1 aired in first-run syndication	5
The Dick Van Dyke Show	October 3, 1961	June 1, 1966		5
Oh! Those Bells	March 8, 1962	May 31, 1962		1
The Beverly Hillbillies	September 26, 1962	March 23, 1971		9
The Real McCoys	September 30, 1962	June 30, 1963	Season 6 only Seasons 1–5 aired on ABC	1
The Lucy Show	October 1, 1962	March 11, 1968		6
Vacation Playhouse	July 22, 1963	August 28, 1967		5
Petticoat Junction	September 1, 1963	April 4, 1970		7
The New Phil Silvers Show	September 28, 1963	April 25, 1964		1
My Favorite Martian	September 29, 1963	May 1, 1966		3
The Cara Williams Show	September 23, 1964	April 21, 1965		1
The Munsters	September 24, 1964	May 12, 1966		2
Gomer Pyle, U.S.M.C.	September 25, 1964	May 2, 1969		5
Gilligan's Island	September 26, 1964	April 17, 1967		3
The Joey Bishop Show	September 27, 1964	March 30, 1965	Season 4 only Seasons 1–3 aired on NBC	1
My Living Doll	September 27, 1964	March 17, 1965		1
Hazel	September 13, 1965	April 11, 1966	Season 5 only Seasons 1–4 aired on NBC	1
Green Acres	September 15, 1965	April 27, 1971		6
My Three Sons	September 16, 1965	April 13, 1972	Seasons 6–12 only Seasons 1–5 aired on ABC	7
Hogan's Heroes	September 17, 1965	March 28, 1971		6
The Smothers Brothers Show	September 17, 1965	April 22, 1966		1
It's About Time	September 11, 1966	April 2, 1967		1
Family Affair	September 12, 1966	March 4, 1971		5
Mr. Terrific	January 9, 1967	August 28, 1967		1
Good Morning World	September 5, 1967	March 19, 1968		1
He & She	September 6, 1967	March 13, 1968		1
Premiere	July 1, 1968	September 9, 1968		1
Here's Lucy	September 23, 1968	March 18, 1974		6
Mayberry R.F.D.	September 23, 1968	September 6, 1971		3
The Doris Day Show	September 24, 1968	March 12, 1973		5
The Good Guys	September 25, 1968	January 23, 1970		2
Blondie	September 26, 1968	January 9, 1969		1
The Queen & I	January 16, 1969	April 24, 1969		1
The Governor & J.J.	September 23, 1969	December 30, 1970		2
Get Smart	September 26, 1969	May 15, 1970	Season 5 only Seasons 1–4 aired on NBC	1
To Rome with Love	September 28, 1969	September 1, 1971		2
The Tim Conway Show	January 30, 1970	June 19, 1970		1
Arnie	September 19, 1970	March 6, 1972		2
The Mary Tyler Moore Show	September 19, 1970	March 19, 1977		7
The New Andy Griffith Show	January 8, 1971	May 21, 1971		1
All in the Family	January 12, 1971	April 8, 1979		9
Comedy Playhouse	August 1, 1971	September 5, 1971		1
The Chicago Teddy Bears	September 17, 1971	December 10, 1971		1
The New Dick Van Dyke Show	September 18, 1971	March 18, 1974		3
Funny Face	September 18, 1971	December 11, 1971		1
Me and the Chimp	January 13, 1972	April 27, 1972		1
The New Bill Cosby Show	September 11, 1972	March 5, 1973		1
Maude	September 12, 1972	April 22, 1978		6
The Bob Newhart Show	September 16, 1972	April 1, 1978		6
Bridget Loves Bernie	September 16, 1972	March 3, 1973		1
M*A*S*H	September 17, 1972	February 28, 1983		11
The Sandy Duncan Show	September 17, 1972	December 31, 1972		1
Anna and the King	September 17, 1972	December 31, 1972		1
Calucci's Department	September 14, 1973	December 28, 1973		1
Roll Out	October 5, 1973	January 4, 1974		1
Good Times	February 8, 1974	August 1, 1979		6
Rhoda	September 9, 1974	December 9, 1978		5
Friends and Lovers	September 14, 1974	January 4, 1975		1
The Jeffersons	January 18, 1975	July 2, 1985		11
We'll Get By	March 14, 1975	May 30, 1975		1
Joe and Sons	April 18, 1975	January 13, 1976		1
Big Eddie	August 23, 1975	November 7, 1975		1
Phyllis	September 8, 1975	March 13, 1977		2
Doc	September 13, 1975	October 30, 1976		1
One Day at a Time	December 16, 1975	May 28, 1984		9
Popi	January 20, 1976	August 24, 1976		1
Alice	August 31, 1976	March 19, 1985		9
All's Fair	September 20, 1976	April 30, 1977		1
Ball Four	September 22, 1976	October 27, 1976		1
Busting Loose	January 17, 1977	November 16, 1977		1
Loves Me, Loves Me Not	March 20, 1977	April 27, 1977		1
Szysznyk	August 1, 1977	January 25, 1978		1
A Year at the Top	August 5, 1977	September 2, 1977		1
The Betty White Show	September 22, 1977	January 2, 1978		1
The Tony Randall Show	September 24, 1977	March 25, 1978	Season 2 only Season 1 aired on ABC	1
We've Got Each Other	October 1, 1977	January 7, 1978		1
On Our Own	October 9, 1977	August 27, 1978		1
Baby... I'm Back!	January 30, 1978	April 24, 1978		1
Husbands, Wives & Lovers	March 10, 1978	June 30, 1978		1
Another Day	April 8, 1978	April 29, 1978		1
The Ted Knight Show	April 8, 1978	May 13, 1978		1
Flying High	August 28, 1978	January 23, 1979		1
WKRP in Cincinnati	September 18, 1978	April 21, 1982		4
In the Beginning	September 20, 1978	October 18, 1978		1
Billy	February 26, 1979	April 28, 1979		1
Flatbush	February 26, 1979	March 12, 1979		1
The Bad News Bears	March 24, 1979	July 26, 1980		2
Hanging In	August 8, 1979	August 29, 1980		1
Working Stiffs	September 15, 1979	October 20, 1979		1
The Last Resort	September 19, 1979	March 17, 1980		1
Struck by Lightning	September 19, 1979	October 3, 1979		1
Archie Bunker's Place	September 23, 1979	April 4, 1983		4
House Calls	December 17, 1979	September 13, 1982		3
Flo	March 24, 1980	July 21, 1981		2
Ladies' Man	October 27, 1980	February 21, 1981		1
Private Benjamin	April 6, 1981	January 10, 1983		3
The Two of Us	April 6, 1981	February 24, 1982		2
Checking In	April 9, 1981	April 30, 1981		1
Park Place	April 9, 1981	April 30, 1981		1
Mr. Merlin	October 7, 1981	March 22, 1982		1
Making the Grade	April 5, 1982	May 10, 1982		1
Report to Murphy	April 5, 1982	May 31, 1982		1
Filthy Rich	August 9, 1982	July 15, 1983		1
Gloria	September 26, 1982	April 10, 1983		1
Square Pegs	September 27, 1982	March 7, 1983		1
Newhart	October 25, 1982	May 21, 1990		8
Ace Crawford, Private Eye	March 15, 1983	April 12, 1983		1
Gun Shy	March 15, 1983	April 19, 1983		1
Goodnight, Beantown	April 2, 1983	January 18, 1984		1
AfterMASH	September 26, 1983	May 31, 1985		2
Domestic Life	January 4, 1984	February 1, 1984		1
Empire	January 4, 1984	April 15, 1984		1
Maggie Briggs	March 4, 1984	April 15, 1984		1
Mama Malone	March 7, 1984	July 21, 1984		1
Kate & Allie	March 19, 1984	May 22, 1989		6
E/R	September 16, 1984	February 27, 1985		1
Charles in Charge	October 3, 1984	April 3, 1985	Season 1 only Moved to first-run syndication for seasons 2–5	1
Dreams	October 3, 1984	October 31, 1984		1
The Lucie Arnaz Show	April 2, 1985	June 11, 1986		1
Charlie & Co.	September 18, 1985	May 16, 1986		1
George Burns Comedy Week	September 18, 1985	December 25, 1985		1
Stir Crazy	September 18, 1985	January 7, 1986		1
Foley Square	December 11, 1985	April 8, 1986		1
Mary	December 11, 1985	April 8, 1986		1
Fast Times	March 5, 1986	April 23, 1986		1
Tough Cookies	March 5, 1986	April 23, 1986		1
Leo & Liz in Beverly Hills	April 25, 1986	June 6, 1986		1
Together We Stand	September 22, 1986	April 24, 1987	Renamed Nothing Is Easy on February 8, 1987	1
Designing Women	September 29, 1986	May 24, 1993		7
Better Days	October 1, 1986	October 29, 1986		1
My Sister Sam	October 6, 1986	April 12, 1988		2
The Cavanaughs	December 1, 1986	July 27, 1989		2
The Popcorn Kid	March 23, 1987	April 24, 1987		1
Roxie	April 1, 1987	April 8, 1987		1
Take Five	April 1, 1987	April 8, 1987		1
CBS Summer Playhouse	June 12, 1987	August 22, 1989		3
Frank's Place	September 14, 1987	March 22, 1988		1
Everything's Relative	October 3, 1987	November 7, 1987		1
Eisenhower and Lutz	March 14, 1988	June 20, 1988		1
Coming of Age	March 15, 1988	July 27, 1989		1
Trial and Error	March 15, 1988	March 29, 1988		1
Annie McGuire	October 26, 1988	December 28, 1988		1
The Van Dyke Show	October 26, 1988	December 7, 1988		1
Raising Miranda	November 5, 1988	December 31, 1988		1
Murphy Brown	November 14, 1988	December 20, 2018		11
Heartland	March 20, 1989	June 12, 1989		1
Live-In	March 20, 1989	May 29, 1989		1
Doctor Doctor	June 12, 1989	July 6, 1991		3
Major Dad	September 17, 1989	April 16, 1993		4
The Famous Teddy Z	September 18, 1989	May 12, 1990		1
The People Next Door	September 18, 1989	October 16, 1989		1
City	January 29, 1990	June 8, 1990		1
His & Hers	March 5, 1990	August 22, 1990		1
Normal Life	March 21, 1990	July 18, 1990		1
Sydney	March 21, 1990	June 25, 1990		1
Bagdad Cafe	March 30, 1990	July 27, 1991		1
Sugar and Spice	March 30, 1990	May 25, 1990		1
Lenny	September 10, 1990	March 9, 1991		1
Uncle Buck	September 10, 1990	March 9, 1991		1
The Family Man	September 11, 1990	July 17, 1991		1
The Hogan Family	September 15, 1990	July 20, 1991	Season 6 only Seasons 1–5 aired on NBC	1
Evening Shade	September 21, 1990	May 23, 1994		4
You Take the Kids	December 15, 1990	January 12, 1991		1
Sunday Dinner	June 2, 1991	July 7, 1991		1
Good Sports	January 10, 1991	July 13, 1991		1
The Royal Family	September 18, 1991	May 13, 1992		1
Teech	September 18, 1991	October 16, 1991		1
Brooklyn Bridge	September 20, 1991	August 6, 1993		2
Princesses	September 27, 1991	October 25, 1991		1
Davis Rules	December 30, 1991	May 13, 1992	Season 2 only Season 1 aired on ABC	1
Grapevine	June 15, 1992	July 27, 1992		1
Frannie's Turn	September 13, 1992	October 10, 1992		1
Hearts Afire	September 14, 1992	February 1, 1995		3
Bob	September 18, 1992	December 27, 1993		1
The Golden Palace	September 18, 1992	May 14, 1993		1
Love & War	September 21, 1992	February 1, 1995		3
Good Advice	April 2, 1993	September 6, 1994		2
A League of Their Own	April 10, 1993	August 13, 1993		1
Dudley	April 16, 1993	May 14, 1993		1
The Boys	August 18, 1993	September 17, 1993		1
The Building	August 20, 1993	September 17, 1993		1
The Trouble with Larry	August 25, 1993	September 8, 1993		1
It Had to Be You	September 19, 1993	October 15, 1993		1
Dave's World	September 20, 1993	June 20, 1997		4
Family Album	September 24, 1993	November 12, 1993		1
The Nanny	November 3, 1993	June 23, 1999		6
Tom	March 2, 1994	June 13, 1994		1
704 Hauser	April 11, 1994	May 9, 1994		1
Muddling Through	July 9, 1994	September 7, 1994		1
The Boys Are Back	September 11, 1994	January 28, 1995		1
Daddy's Girls	September 21, 1994	October 12, 1994		1
The 5 Mrs. Buchanans	September 24, 1994	March 25, 1995		1
Cybill	January 2, 1995	July 13, 1998		4
Double Rush	January 4, 1995	April 12, 1995		1
Women of the House	January 4, 1995	August 18, 1995	The first eight episodes only The remaining five episodes were released on Lifetime	1
The George Wendt Show	March 8, 1995	April 12, 1995		1
Bless This House	September 11, 1995	January 17, 1996		1
Almost Perfect	September 17, 1995	October 30, 1996		1
Can't Hurry Love	September 18, 1995	February 26, 1996		1
If Not for You	September 18, 1995	October 9, 1995		1
Bonnie	September 22, 1995	April 7, 1996		1
High Society	October 30, 1995	February 26, 1996		1
Everybody Loves Raymond	September 13, 1996	May 16, 2005		9
Cosby	September 16, 1996	April 28, 2000		4
Pearl	September 16, 1996	June 25, 1997		1
Ink	October 21, 1996	May 19, 1997		1
Temporarily Yours	March 5, 1997	April 9, 1997		1
George and Leo	September 15, 1997	March 16, 1998		1
The Gregory Hines Show	September 15, 1997	February 27, 1998		1
Family Matters	September 19, 1997	July 17, 1998	Season 9 only Seasons 1–8 aired on ABC	1
Meego	September 19, 1997	October 24, 1997		1
Step by Step	September 19, 1997	June 26, 1998	Season 7 only Seasons 1–6 aired on ABC	1
Style & Substance	January 5, 1998	September 2, 1998		1
The Closer	February 23, 1998	May 4, 1998		1
The Simple Life	June 3, 1998	July 8, 1998		1
The Brian Benben Show	September 21, 1998	October 12, 1998		1
The King of Queens	September 21, 1998	May 14, 2007		9
Maggie Winters	September 30, 1998	February 3, 1999		1
Becker	November 2, 1998	January 28, 2004		6
Payne	March 15, 1999	April 28, 1999		1
Ladies Man	September 20, 1999	June 27, 2001		2
Work with Me	September 29, 1999	October 20, 1999		1
Love & Money	October 8, 1999	July 18, 2000		1
Grapevine	February 28, 2000	March 27, 2000		1
Yes, Dear	October 2, 2000	February 15, 2006		6
Bette	October 11, 2000	March 7, 2001		1
Welcome to New York	October 11, 2000	January 17, 2001		1
Some of My Best Friends	February 28, 2001	April 1, 2001		1
The Ellen Show	September 24, 2001	January 11, 2002		1
Baby Bob	March 18, 2002	June 20, 2003		2
Still Standing	September 30, 2002	March 8, 2006		4
My Big Fat Greek Life	February 24, 2003	April 13, 2003		1
Charlie Lawrence	June 15, 2003	June 22, 2003		1
Two and a Half Men	September 22, 2003	February 19, 2015		12
The Stones	March 17, 2004	March 31, 2004		1
Listen Up	September 20, 2004	April 25, 2005		1
Center of the Universe	October 27, 2004	January 19, 2005		1
How I Met Your Mother	September 19, 2005	March 31, 2014		9
Out of Practice	September 19, 2005	March 29, 2006		1
Courting Alex	January 23, 2006	March 29, 2006		1
The New Adventures of Old Christine	March 13, 2006	May 12, 2010		5
The Class	September 18, 2006	March 5, 2007		1
Rules of Engagement	February 5, 2007	May 20, 2013		7
The Big Bang Theory	September 24, 2007	May 16, 2019		12
Welcome to The Captain	February 4, 2008	March 3, 2008		1
Worst Week	September 22, 2008	June 6, 2009		1
Gary Unmarried	September 24, 2008	March 17, 2010		2
Accidentally on Purpose	September 21, 2009	April 21, 2010		1
Mike & Molly	September 20, 2010	May 16, 2016		6
$#*! My Dad Says	September 23, 2010	February 17, 2011		1
Mad Love	February 14, 2011	May 16, 2011		1
2 Broke Girls	September 19, 2011	April 17, 2017		6
How to Be a Gentleman	September 29, 2011	June 23, 2012		1
Rob	January 12, 2012	March 1, 2012		1
Partners	September 24, 2012	November 12, 2012		1
Mom	September 23, 2013	May 13, 2021		8
The Crazy Ones	September 26, 2013	April 17, 2014		1
We Are Men	September 30, 2013	October 14, 2013		1
The Millers	October 3, 2013	July 18, 2015		2
Friends with Better Lives	March 31, 2014	May 26, 2014		1
Bad Teacher	April 24, 2014	July 26, 2014		1
The McCarthys	October 30, 2014	July 11, 2015		1
The Odd Couple	February 19, 2015	January 30, 2017		3
Life in Pieces	September 21, 2015	June 27, 2019		4
Angel from Hell	January 7, 2016	July 23, 2016		1
Kevin Can Wait	September 19, 2016	May 7, 2018		2
Man with a Plan	October 24, 2016	June 11, 2020		4
The Great Indoors	October 27, 2016	May 8, 2017		1
Superior Donuts	February 2, 2017	May 14, 2018		2
Me, Myself & I	September 25, 2017	July 21, 2018		1
Young Sheldon	September 25, 2017	May 16, 2024		7
9JKL	October 2, 2017	February 5, 2018		1
Living Biblically	February 26, 2018	July 21, 2018		1
Happy Together	October 1, 2018	January 14, 2019		1
The Neighborhood	October 1, 2018	May 11, 2026		8
Fam	January 10, 2019	April 11, 2019		1
Bob Hearts Abishola	September 23, 2019	May 6, 2024		5
Carol's Second Act	September 26, 2019	March 12, 2020		1
The Unicorn	September 26, 2019	March 18, 2021		2
Broke	April 2, 2020	June 25, 2020		1
B Positive	November 5, 2020	March 10, 2022		2
United States of Al	April 1, 2021	May 19, 2022		2
How We Roll	March 31, 2022	May 19, 2022		1
Poppa's House	October 21, 2024	April 28, 2025		1
DMV	October 13, 2025	May 11, 2026		1

== Animation ==
=== Adult animation ===
Title	Premiere date	Finale	Notes	Seasons
Where's Huddles?	July 2, 1970	September 1, 1970		1
Fish Police	February 28, 1992	March 13, 1992		1
Family Dog	June 23, 1993	July 28, 1993		1
Creature Comforts	June 4, 2007	June 18, 2007		1

=== Children's animation ===
Title	Premiere date	Finale	Notes	Seasons
The Alvin Show	October 4, 1961	March 28, 1962		1
Tom and Jerry	September 25, 1965	September 17, 1972		1
Famous Classic Tales	November 1, 1970	November 23, 1984		1

== Unscripted ==
=== Docuseries ===
Title	Premiere date	Finale	Notes	Seasons
The FBI Declassified	October 6, 2020	August 18, 2021		1
The Real CSI: Miami	June 26, 2024	September 4, 2024		1
FBI True	November 7, 2023	February 14, 2024	Season 4 only Seasons 1–3, 5–present are released on Paramount+	1

=== Game shows ===
Title	Premiere date	Finale	Notes	Seasons
What's My Line?	February 2, 1950	September 3, 1967		25
Beat the Clock	March 23, 1950	September 16, 1958	Seasons 1–8 only Moved to ABC for seasons 9–11	8
I've Got a Secret	June 19, 1952	April 3, 1967		15
Bank on the Stars	June 20, 1953	August 8, 1953	Season 1 only Moved to NBC for season 2	1
Name That Tune	July 6, 1953	October 19, 1959	Seasons 3–10 only Seasons 1–2 aired on NBC	8
To Tell the Truth	December 18, 1956	September 6, 1968		11
For Love or Money	May 29, 1958	January 30, 1959		1
College Bowl	1959	1963	Seasons 3–6 only Seasons 1–2, 7–14 aired on NBC	4
Password	October 2, 1961	September 15, 1967	Seasons 1–5 only Moved to ABC for seasons 6–9	5
The Amateur's Guide to Love	March 27, 1972	June 23, 1972		1
Gambit	September 4, 1972	December 10, 1976		5
The Joker's Wild	September 4, 1972	June 13, 1975	Seasons 1–3 only Moved to first-run syndication for seasons 4–12	3
The $10,000 Pyramid	March 26, 1973	March 29, 1974	Season 1 only Moved to ABC for seasons 2–3	1
Hollywood's Talking	March 26, 1973	June 22, 1973		1
Match Game	July 2, 1973	April 20, 1979	Seasons 8–13 only Seasons 1–7 aired on NBC	6
Tattletales	February 18, 1974	March 31, 1978		5
Now You See It	April 1, 1974	June 13, 1975		2
Musical Chairs	June 16, 1975	October 31, 1975		1
Spin-Off	June 16, 1975	September 5, 1975		1
Give-n-Take	September 8, 1975	November 28, 1975		1
I've Got a Secret	June 15, 1976	July 6, 1976		1
Double Dare	December 13, 1976	April 29, 1977		1
Pass the Buck	April 3, 1978	June 30, 1978		1
Tic-Tac-Dough	July 3, 1978	September 1, 1978	Season 5 only Seasons 1–4 aired on NBC; Moved to first-run syndication for seasons 8–13	1
Whew!	April 23, 1979	May 30, 1980		2
All-New Beat the Clock	September 17, 1979	February 1, 1980	Renamed to The All-New All-Star Beat The Clock on November 5, 1979	2
Tattletales	January 18, 1982	June 1, 1984		
The New $25,000 Pyramid	September 20, 1982	September 2, 1988		6
Child's Play	September 20, 1982	September 16, 1983		2
Press Your Luck	September 19, 1983	September 26, 1986		4
Body Language	June 4, 1984	January 3, 1986		2
Card Sharks	January 6, 1986	March 31, 1989	Seasons 4–7 only Seasons 1–3 aired on NBC; Moved to first-run syndication for season 8	4
Blackout	January 4, 1988	April 1, 1988		1
Family Feud	July 4, 1988	March 25, 1993	Seasons 18–23 only Seasons 1–10 aired on ABC; Seasons 11–18, 24–30 aired in first-run syndication	6
Now You See It	April 3, 1989	July 14, 1989		1
Wheel of Fortune	July 17, 1989	January 11, 1991	Seasons 15–16 only Seasons 1–14, 17 aired on NBC; Moved to first-run syndication for season 18–present	2
The Hollywood Game	June 19, 1992	July 10, 1992		1
Wheel 2000	September 13, 1997	February 7, 1998	Also known as Wheel of Fortune 2000	1
Winning Lines	January 8, 2000	February 18, 2000		1
Gameshow Marathon	May 31, 2006	June 29, 2006		1
Power of 10	August 7, 2007	January 23, 2008		1
Million Dollar Password	June 1, 2008	June 14, 2009		2
Game Show in My Head	January 3, 2009	January 24, 2009		1
Candy Crush	July 8, 2017	September 2, 2017		1
TKO: Total Knock Out	July 11, 2018	September 21, 2018		1
Million Dollar Mile	March 27, 2019	August 3, 2019		1
Game On!	May 27, 2020	July 22, 2020		1
Lingo	January 11, 2023	September 20, 2024		2
Superfan	August 9, 2023	September 20, 2023		1
Loteria Loca	October 2, 2023	December 24, 2023		1
Raid the Cage	October 13, 2023	June 25, 2025		2
After Midnight	January 17, 2024	June 13, 2025		2

=== Reality ===
Title	Premiere date	Finale	Notes	Seasons
Candid Camera	September 10, 1960	November 11, 1967		7
That's My Line	August 9, 1980	April 11, 1981		2
Top Cops	August 18, 1990	December 8, 1993		4
Kids Say the Darndest Things	May 16, 1997	June 23, 2000		3
Unsolved Mysteries	November 13, 1997	June 11, 1999	Seasons 10–11 only Seasons 1–9 aired on NBC; Moved to Lifetime for seasons 12–13	2
Candid Camera	February 27, 1998	July 21, 2001	Seasons 1–3 only Moved to Pac TV for seasons 4–6	3
Cupid	July 9, 2003	September 17, 2003		1
The Will	January 8, 2005			1
Fire Me...Please	June 7, 2005	July 5, 2005		1
The Cut	June 9, 2005	September 7, 2005		1
Rock Star	July 11, 2005	September 13, 2006		2
Tuesday Night Book Club	June 13, 2006	June 21, 2006		1
Armed & Famous	January 10, 2007	January 24, 2007		1
Pirate Master	May 31, 2007	August 28, 2007		1
Kid Nation	September 19, 2007	December 12, 2007		1
Greatest American Dog	July 10, 2008	September 10, 2008		1
There Goes the Neighborhood	August 9, 2009	September 13, 2009		1
Live to Dance	January 4, 2011	February 9, 2011		1
Same Name	July 24, 2011	August 14, 2011		1
Dogs in the City	May 30, 2012	July 11, 2012		1
3	July 26, 2012	July 29, 2012		1
The Job	February 8, 2013	February 15, 2013		1
Brooklyn DA	May 28, 2013	July 6, 2013		1
The American Baking Competition	May 29, 2013	July 10, 2013		1
The Briefcase	May 27, 2015	June 26, 2015		1
Hunted	January 22, 2017	March 1, 2017		1
Celebrity Big Brother	February 7, 2018	February 23, 2022		3
Celebrity Undercover Boss	May 11, 2018	June 22, 2018		1
Whistleblower	July 13, 2018	June 28, 2019		2
The World's Best	February 3, 2019	March 13, 2019		1
Love Island	July 9, 2019	August 15, 2021	Seasons 1–3 only Moved to Peacock for season 4–present	3
Tough as Nails	July 8, 2020	July 30, 2023		5
Kids Say the Darndest Things	May 5, 2021	May 23, 2021	Season 2 only Season 1 aired on ABC	1
Secret Celebrity Renovation	July 9, 2021	September 20, 2024		3
House Calls with Dr. Phil	August 18, 2021	September 15, 2021		1
Beyond the Edge	March 16, 2022	May 18, 2022		1
Come Dance with Me	April 15, 2022	June 24, 2022		1
The Challenge: USA	July 6, 2022	October 19, 2023		2
The Real Love Boat	October 5, 2022	October 26, 2022	The first four episodes only The remaining eight episodes were released on Paramount+	1
Buddy Games	September 14, 2023	November 2, 2023		1
Big Brother Reindeer Games	December 11, 2023	December 21, 2023		1
The Summit	September 29, 2024	December 4, 2024		1

=== Variety ===
Title	Premiere date	Finale	Notes	Seasons
The Ed Sullivan Show	June 20, 1948	June 6, 1971		24
Arthur Godfrey's Talent Scouts	December 6, 1948	January 1, 1958		10
Arthur Godfrey and His Friends	January 12, 1949	April 28, 1959		10
Joey Faye's Frolics	April 5, 1950	April 12, 1950		1
The Garry Moore Show	June 26, 1950	January 8, 1967		16
The Steve Allen Show	December 25, 1950	September 11, 1952	Moved to daytime television in March 1951; returned to prime time for a six-episode summer run in 1952	2
The Jackie Gleason Show (1952)	September 20, 1952	June 22, 1957		4
The Larry Storch Show	July 11, 1953	September 12, 1953		1
The Red Skelton Show	September 22, 1953	April 17, 1970	Seasons 3–19 only Seasons 1–2, 20 aired on NBC	17
The Jackie Gleason Show (1961)	February 3, 1961	March 24, 1961		1
The Danny Kaye Show	September 25, 1963	June 28, 1967		4
The Entertainers	September 25, 1964	March 27, 1965		1
The Smothers Brothers Comedy Hour	September 5, 1967	June 8, 1969		3
The Carol Burnett Show	September 11, 1967	March 29, 1978		11
Hee Haw	June 15, 1969	February 23, 1971	Seasons 1–2 only Seasons 3–26 aired in first-run syndication	2
The Merv Griffin Show	August 18, 1969	February 11, 1972	Seasons 6–8 only Season 1 aired on NBC. Seasons 2–5, 9–23 aired in first-run syndication	3
The Tim Conway Comedy Hour	September 20, 1970	December 13, 1970		1
The Sonny & Cher Comedy Hour	August 1, 1971	May 29, 1974		4
Tony Orlando and Dawn	July 3, 1974	December 28, 1976	Renamed The Tony Orlando and Dawn Rainbow Hour on September 21, 1976	3
Cher	February 16, 1975	January 4, 1976		2
The Sonny and Cher Show	February 1, 1976	March 11, 1977		2
The Jacksons	June 16, 1976	March 9, 1977		1
Mary	September 24, 1978	October 8, 1978		1
The Mary Tyler Moore Hour	March 4, 1979	June 10, 1979		1
The Tim Conway Show	March 22, 1980	March 7, 1981		2
The Pat Sajak Show	January 9, 1989	April 13, 1990		1
Late Show with David Letterman	August 30, 1993	May 20, 2015		23
The Late Late Show with Tom Snyder	January 9, 1995	March 26, 1999		5
The Late Late Show with Craig Kilborn	March 25, 1999	August 27, 2004		6
Star Search	January 8, 2003	March 13, 2004	Season 13 only Seasons 1–12 aired in first-run syndication	1
The Late Late Show with Craig Ferguson	January 3, 2005	December 19, 2014		10
The Talk	October 18, 2010	December 20, 2024		15
The Late Late Show with James Corden	March 23, 2015	April 27, 2023		9
The Late Show with Stephen Colbert	September 8, 2015	May 21, 2026		11

== Soap operas ==
Title	Premiere date	Finale	Notes	Seasons
The First Hundred Years	December 4, 1950	June 27, 1952		2
The Egg and I	September 3, 1951	August 1, 1952		1
Search for Tomorrow	September 3, 1951	March 26, 1982	Seasons 1–30 only Moved to NBC for seasons 31–35	30
Love of Life	September 24, 1951	February 1, 1980		29
Guiding Light	June 30, 1952	September 18, 2009		57
Valiant Lady	October 12, 1953	August 16, 1957		4
The Brighter Day	January 4, 1954	September 28, 1962		8
The Secret Storm	February 1, 1954	February 8, 1974		20
Woman with a Past	February 1, 1954	July 2, 1954		1
Portia Faces Life	April 5, 1954	July 1, 1955		2
The Road of Life	December 13, 1954	July 1, 1955		1
As the World Turns	April 2, 1956	September 17, 2010		54
The Edge of Night	April 2, 1956	November 28, 1975	Seasons 1–19 only Moved to ABC for seasons 20–28	19
Full Circle	June 27, 1960	March 10, 1961		1
The Clear Horizon	July 11, 1960	June 15, 1962		2
Love Is a Many Splendored Thing	September 18, 1967	March 23, 1973		6
Where the Heart Is	September 8, 1969	March 23, 1973		4
Capitol	March 29, 1982	March 20, 1987		5

== Film presentations ==
- CBS Thursday Night Movie (1965–75)
- The New CBS Tuesday Night Movies (1971–74)
- The CBS Late Movie (1972–84)
- Walt Disney (1981–83)

== News programming ==
- See It Now (1951–58)
- Person to Person (1953–61)
- The Morning Show (1954–56)
- Good Morning! with Will Rogers, Jr. (1956)
- Air Power (1956–57)
- Eyewitness to History (1960–1963)
- Calendar (1961–1963)
- The First Hundred Years (1963–79)
- CBS Morning News (1963–87)
- In the News (1971–86)
- 30 Minutes (1978–82)
- CBS News Nightwatch (1982–92)
- West 57th (1985–89)
- The Morning Program (1987)
- CBS This Morning (1987–1999; 2012–2021)
- Saturday Night with Connie Chung (1989–1990)
- Street Stories (1992–93)
- Up to the Minute (1992–2015)
- Eye to Eye with Connie Chung (1993–95)
- CBS News Saturday Morning (1997–99)
- Public Eye with Bryant Gumbel (1997–98)
- The Early Show (1999–2012)
- The Saturday Early Show (1999–2021)
- 60 Minutes II (1999–2005)
- CBS This Morning Saturday (2012–21)
- Person to Person (2012)
- CBS Overnight News (2015–24)
- Pink Collar Crimes (2018)

== Saturday mornings ==
=== Series ===
- Ace Ventura: Pet Detective (September 16, 1995 – August 30, 1997)
- The Adventures of Hyperman (October 14, 1995 – August 17, 1996)
- The Adventures of Raggedy Ann and Andy (September 17, 1988 – September 8, 1990)
- Aladdin (September 17, 1994 – August 24, 1996)
- All Grown Up! (March 13, 2004 – September 11, 2004)
- All In with Laila Ali (September 28, 2013 – September 26, 2015; 2020–22)
- The All-New Dennis the Menace (September 18, 1993 – September 03, 1994)
- The All New Popeye Hour (September 9, 1978 – September 5, 1983)
- The Alvin Show (1962–65)
- The Amazing Chan and the Chan Clan (September 9 – December 30, 1972)
- Anatole (October 3, 1998 – September 9, 2000)
- The Archie Show (September 14, 1968 – January 4, 1969)
- Archie's TV Funnies (September 11, 1971 – September 1, 1973)
- Ark II (September 18, 1976 – August 25, 1979)
- As Told by Ginger (September 14, 2002 – November 23, 2002)
- Back to the Future (September 14, 1991 – August 28, 1993)
- The Backyardigans (September 18, 2004 – September 9, 2006)
- Bailey Kipper's P.O.V. (September 21, 1996 – September 6, 1997)
- Bailey's Comets (September 8, 1973 – April 13, 1974)
- The Batman/Tarzan Adventure Hour (September 10, 1977 – September 2, 1978)
- The Beagles (September 10, 1966 – September 2, 1967)
- Beakman's World (September 18, 1993 – September 26, 1998)
- Beethoven (September 10, 1994 – September 09, 1995)
- Benji, Zax & the Alien Prince (September 17 – December 17, 1983)
- The Berenstain Bears (September 14, 1985 – September 5, 1987)
- Best Friends Furever (2019–20)
- Bill & Ted's Excellent Adventures (September 15, 1990 – August 31, 1991)
- Birdz (October 3, 1998 – January 2, 1999)
- The Biskitts (September 17, 1983 – September 8, 1984)
- Blackstar (September 12 – December 5, 1981)
- Blaster's Universe (September 11, 1999 – September 9, 2000)
- Blue's Clues (September 16, 2000 – September 9, 2006)
- Bob the Builder (September 22, 2001 – September 7, 2002)
- The Brothers García (March 13, 2004 – September 11, 2004)
- The Bugs Bunny/Road Runner Hour (September 14, 1968 – September 4, 1971; September 6, 1975 – September 7, 1985)
- Busytown Mysteries (September 19, 2009 – September 21, 2013)
- Cadillacs and Dinosaurs (September 18, 1993 – March 19, 1994)
- Cake (September 16, 2006 – September 12, 2009)
- The California Raisin Show (September 16, 1989 – September 1, 1990)
- Captain Kangaroo (October 3, 1955 – December 8, 1984)
- Captain Midnight (September 9, 1954 – January 21, 1956)
- Care Bears: Adventures in Care-a-lot (September 15, 2007 – September 12, 2009)
- CBS Storybreak (March 30, 1985 – October 26, 1991; September 18, 1993 – September 26, 1998)
- ChalkZone (February 1, 2003 – September 11, 2004)
- The Charlie Brown and Snoopy Show (September 17, 1983 – October 12, 1985)
- Chicken Soup for the Soul's Hidden Heroes (October 3, 2015 – June 24, 2017)
- Clue Club (September 4 – December 11, 1976)
- Conan and the Young Warriors (March 5 – September 03, 1994)
- CyberCOPS (March 27 – September 4, 1993)
- Dance Revolution (September 16, 2006 – September 8, 2007)
- Danger Rangers (September 17, 2011 – September 15, 2012)
- Dastardly and Muttley in Their Flying Machines (September 13, 1969 – January 3, 1970)
- Dennis the Menace (January 2 – August 27, 1988)
- Did I Mention Invention? (2022–23)
- Dink, the Little Dinosaur (September 16, 1989 – August 31, 1991)
- DinoSquad (November 3, 2007 – September 12, 2009)
- The Doodlebops (September 17, 2011 – September 21, 2013)
- The Doodlebops' Rockin Road Show (April 3, 2010 – September 3, 2011)
- Dora the Explorer (September 16, 2000 – September 9, 2006)
- Drak Pack (September 6 – December 20, 1980)
- The Dukes (February 5 – October 29, 1983)
- Dumb Bunnies (October 3, 1998 – March 27, 1999)
- Dungeons & Dragons (September 17, 1983 – September 5, 1987)
- Far Out Space Nuts (September 6, 1975 – September 2, 1976)
- Fat Albert and the Cosby Kids (September 9, 1972 – November 13, 1982)
- Fievel's American Tails (September 19, 1992 – September 11, 1993)
- The Flintstone Comedy Hour (September 9, 1972 – January 26, 1974)
- Flip! (1988)
- Flying Rhino Junior High (1998–2000)
- Frankenstein Jr. and The Impossibles (September 10, 1966 – January 17, 1967)
- Franklin (October 3, 1998 – January 30, 1999; September 16, 2000 – September 7, 2002)
- Fudge (September 13 – December 27, 1997)
- Galaxy High School (September 13, 1986 – August 20, 1988)
- Game Changers with Kevin Frazier (2013–16)
- Garfield and Friends (September 17, 1988 – October 7, 1995)
- The Get Along Gang (September 15, 1984 – June 28, 1986)
- The Ghost Busters (September 6 – December 13, 1975)
- Gilligan's Planet (September 18 – December 11, 1982)
- Go, Diego, Go! (September 17, 2005 – September 9, 2006)
- Harlem Globetrotters (September 12, 1970 – May 20, 1973)
- The Harlem Globetrotters Popcorn Machine (September 7, 1974 – August 30, 1975)
- The Heckle and Jeckle Cartoon Show (October 14, 1956 – 1966)
- Hello Kitty's Furry Tale Theater (September 19, 1987 – September 10, 1988)
- Help!... It's the Hair Bear Bunch! (September 11, 1971 – January 8, 1972)
- The Herculoids (September 9, 1967 – January 6, 1968)
- Hey Arnold! (September 14, 2002 – September 11, 2004)
- Hey Vern, It's Ernest! (September 17, 1988 – September 2, 1989)
- Hong Kong Phooey (1975–1980)
- Horseland (September 16, 2006 – September 12, 2009; February 5, 2011 – September 15, 2012)
- Hulk Hogan's Rock 'n' Wrestling (September 14, 1985 – June 27, 1987)
- Inspector Gadget (November 2, 1991 – August 29, 1992)
- The Inspectors (October 3, 2015 – May 25, 2019)
- Jamie's 15-Minute Meals (September 28, 2013 – September 20, 2014)
- Jason of Star Command (September 9, 1978 – December 1, 1979)
- Jeannie (September 8 – December 22, 1973)
- The Jetsons (1964–65; 1969–71)
- Josie and the Pussycats (September 12, 1970 – December 23, 1972)
- Kidd Video (September 19 – December 26, 1987)
- Kipper (September 16, 2000 – September 15, 2001)
- The Kwicky Koala Show (September 12 – December 26, 1981)
- Lamp Unto My Feet (1948–79)
- Land of the Lost (June 22 – September 7, 1985; June 20 - September 5, 1987)
- LazyTown (September 18, 2004 – September 9, 2006)
- Liberty's Kids (September 22, 2012 – September 21, 2013)
- The Lion King's Timon & Pumbaa (September 16, 1995 – September 6, 1997)
- Little Bear (September 16, 2000 – September 15, 2001)
- Little Bill (September 16, 2000 – September 7, 2002, August 2, 2003 – March 6, 2004; September 18, 2004 – September 9, 2006)
- The Little Mermaid (September 19, 1992 – September 9, 1995)
- Little Muppet Monsters (September 14 – 28, 1985)
- The Lone Ranger (September 10, 1966 – September 6, 1969)
- Madeline (September 16, 2006 – September 8, 2007)
- Marsupilami (September 18, 1993 – September 10, 1994)
- The Mask: Animated Series (September 16, 1995 – September 6, 1997)
- Meatballs & Spaghetti (September 18, 1982 – March 5, 1983)
- Mighty Mouse: The New Adventures (September 19, 1987 – August 26, 1989)
- Mighty Mouse Playhouse (December 10, 1955 – September 2, 1967)
- Miss Spider's Sunny Patch Friends (September 18, 2004 – September 10, 2005)
- Moby Dick and Mighty Mightor (September 9, 1967 – January 6, 1968)
- The Monkees (September 1969 – September 1972)
- Mother Goose and Grimm (September 14, 1991 – March 20, 1993)
- Muppet Babies (September 15, 1984 – September 5, 1992)
- Mythic Warriors: Guardians of the Legend (October 3, 1998 – September 9, 2000)
- The New Adventures of Batman (February 12, 1977 – May 28, 1977)
- The New Adventures of Mighty Mouse and Heckle & Jeckle (September 8, 1979 – April 8, 1980)
- The New Adventures of Superman (September 10, 1966 – September 5, 1970)
- The New Adventures of Zorro (September 12 – December 5, 1981)
- The New Ghostwriter Mysteries (1997–98)
- The New Scooby-Doo Movies (September 9, 1972 – October 27, 1973)
- Noonbory and the Super Seven (August 15, 2009 – September 11, 2010)
- Oswald (September 22, 2001 – November 23, 2002)
- Pandamonium (September 18 – December 11, 1982)
- Partridge Family 2200 A.D. (September 7 – March 8, 1975)
- The Pebbles and Bamm-Bamm Show (September 11, 1971 – January 1, 1972)
- Pee-wee's Playhouse (September 13, 1986 – August 3, 1991)
- Pelswick (September 14, 2002 – November 23, 2002)
- The Perils of Penelope Pitstop (September 13, 1969 – January 17, 1970)
- Pole Position (September 15, 1984 – August 23, 1986)
- Popeye and Son (September 19 – December 12, 1987)
- Project G.e.e.K.e.R. (September 14, 1996 – August 30, 1997)
- Pryor's Place (September 15, 1984 – June 15, 1985)
- The Puppy's Great Adventures (September 13 – November 8, 1986)
- Raw Toonage (September 19, 1992 – September 11, 1993)
- Really Wild Animals (September 16, 1995 – August 24, 1996)
- Rescue Heroes (September 11, 1999 – September 9, 2000)
- Richie Rich (January 11 – August 30, 1986; November 15 - December 27, 1986)
- Riders in the Sky (September 14, 1991 – August 29, 1992)
- Rude Dog and the Dweebs (September 16 – December 16, 1989)
- Rugrats (February 1, 2003 – August 2, 2003)
- Rupert (January 9 - September 25, 1999)
- Sabrina: The Animated Series (September 15, 2006 – October 27, 2007; September 19, 2009 – January 29, 2011)
- Sabrina the Teenage Witch (September 12, 1970 – August 31, 1974)
- Sabrina's Secret Life (September 18, 2010 – January 29, 2011)
- Santo Bugito (September 16, 1995 – August 17, 1996)
- Saturday Supercade (September 17, 1983 – December 1, 1984)
- Scooby-Doo, Where Are You! (September 13, 1969 – October 31, 1970; 1974–76)
- Secrets of the Cryptkeeper's Haunted House (September 14, 1996 – September 6, 1997)
- The Secrets of Isis (September 6, 1975 – October 23, 1976)
- Shazam! (September 7, 1974 – October 16, 1976)
- The Shazam!/Isis Hour (September 6, 1975 – October 23, 1976)
- Shazzan (September 9, 1967 – January 20, 1968)
- Shirt Tales (1984–85)
- The Skatebirds (September 10, 1977 – January 21, 1978)
- Space Academy (September 10, 1977 – September 1, 1979)
- Space Ghost (September 10, 1966 – September 16, 1967)
- Speed Buggy (September 8, 1973 – January 29, 1983)
- The Sports Illustrated for Kids Show (1997–98)
- Strawberry Shortcake (September 15, 2007 – September 12, 2009; April 3 – September 11, 2010)
- Superman (September 17, 1988 – September 9, 1989)
- Sushi Pack (November 3, 2007 – September 12, 2009)
- Sylvester & Tweety (1976–77)
- Sylvester & Tweety, Daffy & Speedy (1981–82)
- Tales from the Cryptkeeper (October 3–31, 1998; September 11, 1999 – September 9, 2000)
- Tarzan and the Super 7 (September 9, 1978 – September 6, 1980)
- The Tarzan/Lone Ranger Adventure Hour (September 12, 1981 – September 11, 1982)
- Tarzan, Lord of the Jungle (September 11, 1976 – November 3, 1979)
- Teen Wolf (September 13, 1986 – September 2, 1989)
- Teenage Mutant Ninja Turtles (September 8, 1990 – August 23, 1997)
- Tennessee Tuxedo and His Tales (September 28, 1963 – January 29, 1966)
- Tom and Jerry (September 25, 1965 – September 17, 1972)
- The Tom and Jerry Comedy Show (September 6 – December 13, 1980)
- Trollkins (September 12 – December 5, 1981)
- Trollz (September 16, 2006 – October 27, 2007; February 5 – September 15, 2011)
- The Twisted Tales of Felix the Cat (September 16, 1995 – August 23, 1997)
- Underdog (1966–67)
- The U.S. of Archie (September 7 – December 21, 1974)
- Valley of the Dinosaurs (September 7 – December 21, 1974)
- Wacky Races (September 14, 1968 – January 4, 1969)
- What's New, Mr. Magoo? (September 10 – December 24, 1977)
- The Weird Al Show (September 13, 1997 – September 26, 1998)
- Wheel 2000 (September 13, 1997 – September 26, 1998)
- Where's Waldo? (September 14, 1991 – September 5, 1992)
- The Wild Thornberrys (September 14, 2002 – March 6, 2004)
- Wildfire (September 13, 1986 – September 5, 1987)
- The Wuzzles (September 14, 1985 – September 6, 1986)

=== Interstitials ===
- Amby & Dexter
- I Can Do It!
- In the Know (1970–71)
- In the News (1971–86)
- Just Ask!
- Just for Me Stories
- LazyTown Shorts
- Maggie and the Ferocious Beast
- Mighty Bug 5
- Miss Spider's Bug Facts
- Nick Jr. Playful Parent
- Nick Jr. Presents
- Nick Jr. Show and Tell
- Nick Jr. Sings
- Nickelodeon Election Connection
- Stickin' Around (1994–95)
- Tinpo (2007–09)
- What's the Buzz with Philomena Fly
- What's on Your Plate?

== Specials ==
- The Walt Disney Christmas Show (December 25, 1951)
- The Ford 50th Anniversary Show (June 15, 1953)
- General Foods 25th Anniversary Show: A Salute to Rodgers and Hammerstein (March 28, 1954)
- The Wizard of Oz (1956; 1959–67; 1976–98)
- Miss USA/Miss Universe (1960–2002)
- The Good Years (January 12, 1962)
- Julie and Carol at Carnegie Hall (June 11, 1962)
- The Lucille Ball Comedy Hour (April 19, 1964)
- My Name Is Barbra (April 28, 1965)
- National Drivers Test (May 24, 1965)
- A Charlie Brown Christmas (December 9, 1965)
- An Evening with Carol Channing (February 18, 1966)
- Carol + 2 (March 22, 1966)
- Color Me Barbra (March 30, 1966)
- Charlie Brown's All Stars! (June 8, 1966)
- It's the Great Pumpkin, Charlie Brown (October 27, 1966)
- How the Grinch Stole Christmas! (December 18, 1966)
- Inside Pop: The Rock Revolution (April 25, 1967)
- You're in Love, Charlie Brown (June 12, 1967)
- The Belle of 14th Street (October 11, 1967)
- The Tennessee Ernie Ford Special (December 3, 1967)
- He's Your Dog, Charlie Brown (February 14, 1968)
- A Happening in Central Park (September 15, 1968)
- The Ann-Margret Show (December 1, 1968)
- Dick Van Dyke and the Other Woman (April 13, 1969)
- 21st Primetime Emmy Awards (June 8, 1969)
- Archie and his New Pals (September 13, 1969)
- Make Room for Granddaddy (September 14, 1969)
- It Was a Short Summer, Charlie Brown (September 27, 1969)
- Sinatra: Featuring Don Costa and His Orchestra (November 5, 1969)
- Frosty the Snowman (December 7, 1969)
- Horton Hears a Who! (March 19, 1970)
- Raquel! (April 26, 1970)
- The 5th Dimension Special: An Odyssey in the Cosmic Universe of Peter Max (May 21, 1970)
- The Cat in the Hat (March 10, 1971)
- Singer Presents Burt Bacharach (March 14, 1971)
- The Doris Mary Anne Kappelhoff Special (March 14, 1971)
- Play It Again, Charlie Brown (March 28, 1971)
- Aesop's Fables (October 31, 1971)
- Julie and Carol at Lincoln Center (December 7, 1971)
- The Lorax (February 14, 1972)
- Oh, Nurse! (March 17, 1972)
- The Singles (March 17, 1972)
- The Living End (March 17, 1972)
- 24th Primetime Emmy Awards (May 14, 1972)
- You're Not Elected, Charlie Brown (October 29, 1972)
- Don Rickles: Alive and Kicking (December 12, 1972)
- The Flintstones on Ice (February 11, 1973)
- Grammy Awards (March 3, 1973 — February 1, 2026)
- There's No Time for Love, Charlie Brown (March 11, 1973)
- The Lily Tomlin Show (March 16, 1973)
- Mitzi... The First Time (March 28, 1973)
- The Nancy Dussault Show (May 8, 1973)
- Two's Company (May 8, 1973)
- The Ted Bessell Show (May 8, 1973)
- Dr. Seuss on the Loose (October 15, 1973)
- Lily (November 2, 1973)
- Barbra Streisand...and Other Musical Instruments (November 2, 1973)
- A Charlie Brown Thanksgiving (November 20, 1973)
- It's a Mystery, Charlie Brown (February 1, 1974)
- Mitzi... A Tribute to the American Housewife (February 4, 1974)
- Really, Raquel (March 8, 1974)
- It's the Easter Beagle, Charlie Brown (April 9, 1974)
- Sandy in Disneyland (April 10, 1974)
- The Perry Como Sunshine Show (April 10, 1974)
- Young Love (May 24, 1974)
- Perry Como's Summer of '74 (September 12, 1974)
- Sandy Duncan Special (November 13, 1974)
- Happy Anniversary and Goodbye (November 19, 1974)
- 'Twas the Night Before Christmas (December 8, 1974)
- The Perry Como Christmas Show (December 17, 1974)
- Rikki-Tikki-Tavi (January 9, 1975)
- The Don Rickles Show - Mr. Warmth (January 19, 1975)
- Be My Valentine, Charlie Brown (January 28, 1975)
- Como Country: Perry and His Nashville Friends (February 17, 1975)
- The Hoober-Bloob Highway (February 19, 1975)
- Doris Day Today (February 19, 1975)
- Lucy Gets Lucky (March 1, 1975)
- Love Nest (March 14, 1975)
- The White Seal (March 24, 1975)
- Mitzi and a Hundred Guys (March 24, 1975)
- Perry Como's Springtime Special (March 27, 1975)
- Black Bart (April 4, 1975)
- 27th Primetime Emmy Awards (May 19, 1975)
- Perry Como's Lake Tahoe Holiday (October 26, 1975)
- You're a Good Sport, Charlie Brown (October 28, 1975)
- Rickles (November 19, 1975)
- Merry Christmas, Fred, from the Crosbys (December 3, 1975)
- Three for Two (December 3, 1975)
- Perry Como's Christmas in Mexico (December 15, 1975)
- Happy Anniversary, Charlie Brown (January 9, 1976)
- Mowgli's Brothers (February 11, 1976)
- Mitzi... Roarin' in the 20's (March 14, 1976)
- It's Arbor Day, Charlie Brown (March 16, 1976)
- Pinocchio (March 27, 1976)
- What Now, Catherine Curtis? (March 30, 1976)
- Bugs and Daffy's Carnival of the Animals (November 22, 1976)
- CBS Salutes Lucy: The First 25 Years (November 28, 1976)
- The George Burns Special (December 1, 1976)
- Bing Crosby's White Christmas (December 1, 1976)
- Johnny Cash Christmas Special (December 6, 1976)
- America Salutes Richard Rodgers: The Sound of His Music (December 9, 1976)
- Circus of the Stars (January 10, 1977 – December 16, 1994)
- The Shirley MacLaine Special: Where Do We Go from Here? (March 12, 1977)
- Bing!... A 50th Anniversary Gala (March 20, 1977)
- Mitzi... Zings Into Spring (March 29, 1977)
- Bugs Bunny's Easter Special (April 7, 1977)
- The People's Command Performance: '77 (April 7, 1977)
- Bugs Bunny in Space (September 6, 1977)
- The Making of The Deep (September 11, 1977)
- Elvis in Concert (October 3, 1977)
- The Fat Albert Halloween Special (October 24, 1977)
- It's Your First Kiss, Charlie Brown (October 24, 1977)
- Bugs Bunny's Howl-oween Special (October 26, 1977)
- Lucy Calls the President (November 21, 1977)
- Once Upon a Brothers Grimm (November 23, 1977)
- The George Burns One-Man Show (November 23, 1977)
- Yabba Dabba Doo! The Happy World of Hanna-Barbera (November 24, 1977)
- Bing Crosby's Merrie Olde Christmas (November 30, 1977)
- The Johnny Cash Christmas Special (November 30, 1977)
- The John Davidson Christmas Special (December 9, 1977)
- The Fat Albert Christmas Special (December 18, 1977)
- Hanna-Barbera's All-Star Comedy Ice Revue (January 13, 1978)
- Leapin' Lizards, It's Liberace! (February 1, 1978)
- A Connecticut Rabbit in King Arthur's Court (February 23, 1978)
- What a Nightmare, Charlie Brown! (February 23, 1978)
- Goldie (March 1, 1978)
- CBS: On the Air (March 26 – April 1, 1978)
- Mitzi... What's Hot, What's Not (April 6, 1978)
- The Natalie Cole Special (April 27, 1978)
- The Popeye Show (September 13, 1978)
- 30th Primetime Emmy Awards (September 17, 1978)
- The Magic of David Copperfield (October 27, 1978)
- Puff the Magic Dragon (October 30, 1978)
- Cinderella at the Palace (November 2, 1978)
- Hollywood's Diamond Jubilee (November 11, 1978)
- How Bugs Bunny Won the West (November 15, 1978)
- Star Wars Holiday Special (November 17, 1978)
- Lucy Comes to Nashville (November 19, 1978)
- Raggedy Ann and Andy in The Great Santa Claus Caper (November 30, 1978)
- Bing Crosby: The Christmas Years (December 6, 1978)
- The Johnny Cash Christmas Show (December 6, 1978)
- A Special Sesame Street Christmas (December 8, 1978)
- Happy Birthday, Charlie Brown (January 5, 1979)
- George Burns' 100th Birthday Party (January 22, 1979)
- Bugs Bunny's Valentine Special (February 14, 1979)
- The Popeye Valentine Special: Sweethearts at Sea (February 14, 1979)
- Dolly & Carol in Nashville (February 14, 1979)
- You're the Greatest, Charlie Brown (March 19, 1979)
- The Lion, the Witch and the Wardrobe (April 1 – 2, 1979)
- A Special Kenny Rogers (April 12, 1979)
- The Bugs Bunny Mother's Day Special (May 12, 1979)
- The Muppets Go Hollywood (May 16, 1979)
- Leif (May 18, 1979)
- The Hobbit (May 19, 1979)
- Shirley MacLaine at the Lido (May 20, 1979)
- The Hanna-Barbera Hall of Fame: Yabba Dabba Doo II (October 12, 1979)
- The Magic of David Copperfield II (October 24, 1979)
- Raggedy Ann and Andy in The Pumpkin Who Couldn't Smile (October 31, 1979)
- Bugs Bunny's Thanksgiving Diet (November 15, 1979)
- Puff the Magic Dragon in the Land of the Living Lies (November 17, 1979)
- The Invisible Children (November 24 – December 4, 1979)
- The Unbroken Circle: A Tribute to Mother Maybelle Carter (November 28, 1979)
- Bugs Bunny's Looney Christmas Tales (November 27, 1979)
- Johnny Cash Christmas (December 6, 1979)
- The Crystal Gayle Special (December 12, 1979)
- All-American College Comedy Show (December 14, 1979)
- Lynda Carter's Special (January 12, 1980)
- The Beatrice Arthur Special (January 19, 1980)
- Goldie and Liza Together (February 19, 1980)
- Ladies and Gentlemen... Bob Newhart (February 19, 1980)
- She's a Good Skate, Charlie Brown (February 25, 1980)
- Kraft Salutes Disneyland's 25th Anniversary (March 6, 1980)
- The Jimmy McNichol Special (April 30, 1980)
- Johnny Cash: The First 25 Years (May 8, 1980)
- The Fantastic Funnies (May 15, 1980)
- Bugs Bunny's Bustin' Out All Over (May 21, 1980)
- Carlton Your Doorman (May 21, 1980)
- Shirley MacLaine... 'Every Little Movement' (May 22, 1980)
- Lynda Carter Encore! (September 16, 1980)
- SP FX: The Empire Strikes Back (September 22, 1980)
- John Schneider: Back Home (September 24, 1980)
- The Magic of David Copperfield III: Levitating Ferrari (September 25, 1980)
- Life Is a Circus, Charlie Brown (October 24, 1980)
- The Bugs Bunny Mystery Special (October 26, 1980)
- Gnomes (November 11, 1980)
- Thanksgiving in the Land of Oz (November 15, 1980)
- A Snow White Christmas (December 19, 1980)
- Lily: Sold Out (February 2, 1981)
- It's Magic, Charlie Brown (April 28, 1981)
- Johnny Cash and the Country Girls (April 29, 1981)
- Lynda Carter's Celebration (May 11, 1981)
- Ladies and Gentlemen... Bob Newhart, Part II (May 14, 1981)
- Bugs Bunny: All American Hero (May 21, 1981)
- 33rd Primetime Emmy Awards (September 13, 1981)
- The Magic of David Copperfield IV: The Vanishing Airplane (October 26, 1981)
- Someday You'll Find Her, Charlie Brown (October 30, 1981)
- No Man's Valley (November 23, 1981)
- Daniel Boone (November 27, 1981)
- A Special Anne Murray Christmas (December 9, 1981)
- Johnny Cash: Christmas in Scotland (December 10, 1981)
- Bugs Bunny's Mad World of Television (January 11, 1982)
- Kraft Salutes Walt Disney World's 10th Anniversary (January 21, 1982)
- Lynda Carter: Street Life (March 5, 1982)
- The Fat Albert Easter Special (April 3, 1982)
- Puff and the Incredible Mr. Nobody (May 17, 1982)
- Lily for President? (May 20, 1982)
- A Charlie Brown Celebration (May 24, 1982)
- Shirley MacLaine... Illusions (June 24, 1982)
- Here Comes Garfield (October 25, 1982)
- E.T. and Friends: Magical Movie Visitors (December 14, 1982)
- Yogi Bear's All Star Comedy Christmas Caper (December 21, 1982)
- It's an Adventure, Charlie Brown (February 21, 1983)
- The Magic of David Copperfield V: The Statue of Liberty Disappears (April 8, 1983)
- Is This Goodbye, Charlie Brown? (May 16, 1983)
- What Have We Learned, Charlie Brown? A Tribute (May 30, 1983)
- Miss Teen USA (August 30, 1983 – August 28, 2002)
- The CBS Saturday Morning Preview Special (September 14, 1983)
- Garfield on the Town (October 28, 1983)
- Classic Creatures: Return of the Jedi (November 21, 1983)
- Beauty and the Beast (November 25, 1983)
- Romeo and Juliet on Ice (November 25, 1983)
- Lynda Carter: Body and Soul (March 16, 1984)
- The Magic of David Copperfield VI: Floating Over the Grand Canyon (April 6, 1984)
- It's Flashbeagle, Charlie Brown (April 16, 1984)
- Saturday's the Place! (September 14, 1984)
- 36th Primetime Emmy Awards (September 16, 1984)
- Garfield in the Rough (October 26, 1984)
- Donald Duck's 50th Birthday (November 13, 1984)
- Kenny & Dolly: A Christmas to Remember (December 2, 1984)
- Johnny Cash: Christmas on the Road (December 6, 1984)
- The Magic of David Copperfield VII: Familiares (March 8, 1985)
- Snoopy's Getting Married, Charlie Brown (March 20, 1985)
- The Romance of Betty Boop (March 20, 1985)
- It's Your 20th Television Anniversary, Charlie Brown (May 14, 1985)
- All Star Rock 'n' Wrestling Saturday Spectacular (September 13, 1985)
- Garfield's Halloween Adventure (October 30, 1985)
- You're a Good Man, Charlie Brown (November 6, 1985)
- The 10th Anniversary Johnny Cash Christmas Special (December 10, 1985)
- The Life and Adventures of Santa Claus (December 17, 1985)
- Happy New Year, Charlie Brown! (January 1, 1986)
- Bugs Bunny/Looney Tunes 50th Anniversary Special (January 14, 1986)
- George Burns' 90th Birthday Party: A Very Special Special (January 17, 1986)
- The Muppets: A Celebration of 30 Years (January 21, 1986)
- The Magic of David Copperfield VIII: Walking Through the Great Wall of China (March 14, 1986)
- The Flintstones' 25th Anniversary Celebration (May 20, 1986)
- Neil Diamond... Hello Again (May 25, 1986)
- Garfield in Paradise (May 27, 1986)
- All-Star Party for Clint Eastwood (November 30, 1986)
- Barbara Mandrell's Christmas: A Family Reunion (December 22, 1986)
- The Magic of David Copperfield IX: The Escape from Alcatraz (March 13, 1987)
- Garfield Goes Hollywood (May 8, 1987)
- Blondie & Dagwood (May 15, 1987)
- Cathy (May 15, 1987)
- A Garfield Christmas (December 21, 1987)
- A Claymation Christmas Celebration (December 21, 1987)
- Santabear's High Flying Adventure (December 24, 1987)
- Snoopy! The Musical (January 29, 1988)
- The Smothers Brothers Comedy Hour: The 20th Reunion (February 3, 1988)
- The Magic of David Copperfield X: The Bermuda Triangle (March 12, 1988)
- Happy Birthday, Garfield (May 17, 1988)
- Irving Berlin's 100th Birthday Celebration (May 27, 1988)
- Roger Rabbit and the Secrets of Toon Town (September 13, 1988)
- It's the Girl in the Red Truck, Charlie Brown (September 27, 1988)
- Seven Wonders of the Circus World (October 7, 1988)
- This Is America, Charlie Brown (October 21, 1988 – May 23, 1989)
- Bugs vs. Daffy: Battle of the Music Video Stars (October 21, 1988)
- Meet the Raisins! (November 4, 1988)
- Cathy's Last Resort (November 11, 1988)
- Garfield: His 9 Lives (November 22, 1988)
- John Denver's Christmas in Aspen (December 19, 1988)
- Bob Hope's Super Bowl Party (January 21, 1989)
- Cathy's Valentine (February 10, 1989)
- Bugs Bunny's Wild World of Sports (February 15, 1989)
- The Magic of David Copperfield XI: Explosive Encounter (March 3, 1989)
- Marvin: Baby of the Year (March 10, 1989)
- Garfield's Babes and Bullets (May 23, 1989)
- Adventures in Babysitting (July 7, 1989)
- Blondie & Dagwood: Second Wedding Workout (November 1, 1989)
- Hägar the Horrible: Hägar Knows Best (November 1, 1989)
- Garfield's Thanksgiving (November 22, 1989)
- You Don't Look 40, Charlie Brown (February 2, 1990)
- The Wonderful Wizard of Oz: 50 Years of Magic (February 20, 1990)
- Why, Charlie Brown, Why? (March 16, 1990)
- The Magic of David Copperfield XII: The Niagara Falls Challenge (March 30, 1990)
- The Yum Yums: The Day Things Went Sour (April 7, 1990)
- Cartoon All-Stars to the Rescue (April 21, 1990)
- Garfield's Feline Fantasies (May 18, 1990)
- Happy Birthday Bugs!: 50 Looney Years (August 15, 1990)
- The Raisins Sold Out!: The California Raisins II (August 29, 1990)
- The Honeymooners Anniversary Special (November 12, 1990)
- The Muppets Celebrate Jim Henson (November 21, 1990)
- Sinatra 75: The Best Is Yet to Come (December 16, 1990)
- All in the Family: 20th Anniversary Special (February 16, 1991)
- The Very Best of The Ed Sullivan Show (February 17, 1991)
- Mary Tyler Moore: The 20th Anniversary Show (February 18, 1991)
- The Magic of David Copperfield XIII: Mystery on the Orient Express (April 9, 1991)
- Bugs Bunny's Overtures to Disaster (April 17, 1991)
- Snoopy's Reunion (May 1, 1991)
- Garfield Gets a Life (May 8, 1991)
- Claymation Comedy of Horrors (May 29, 1991)
- The Dream Is Alive: 20th Anniversary Celebration of Walt Disney World (October 25, 1991)
- The Last Halloween (October 28, 1991)
- The Bob Newhart Show: The 19th Anniversary Special (November 23, 1991)
- The Very Best of The Ed Sullivan Show 2 (November 24, 1991)
- Memories of M*A*S*H (November 25, 1991)
- Mickey's Christmas Carol (December 13, 1991)
- Bugs Bunny's Creature Features (February 1, 1992)
- The Magic of David Copperfield XIV: Flying – Live the Dream (March 31, 1992)
- A Claymation Easter (April 19, 1992)
- The Year of the Generals (June 4, 1992)
- It's Christmastime Again, Charlie Brown (November 27, 1992)
- Kenny Rogers: Keep Christmas with You (December 18, 1992)
- Holiday Greetings from the Ed Sullivan Show (December 20, 1992)
- The Carol Burnett Show: A Reunion (January 10, 1993)
- The Andy Griffith Show Reunion (February 10, 1993)
- The Magic of David Copperfield XV: Fires of Passion (March 12, 1993)
- The Legend of the Beverly Hillbillies (May 24, 1993)
- David Copperfield: 15 Years of Magic (May 12, 1994)
- Kathie Lee Gifford... Looking for Christmas (December 21, 1994)
- Television's Christmas Classics (December 23, 1994)
- The Magic of David Copperfield XVI: Unexplained Forces (May 1, 1995)
- Brady Bunch Home Movies (May 24, 1995)
- Frosty Returns (December 1, 1995)
- Mr. Willowby's Christmas Tree (December 6, 1995)
- Kathie Lee Gifford: Home for Christmas (December 20, 1995)
- Winnie the Pooh and Christmas Too (December 21, 1995)
- The Grand Ole Opry Musical Salute to Minnie Pearl (May 16, 1996)
- Disney's Beauty and the Beast: A Concert On Ice (December 6, 1996)
- The Story of Santa Claus (December 7, 1996)
- Kathie Lee Gifford: Just in Time for Christmas (December 11, 1996)
- The Mysterious Man of the Shroud (April 1, 1997)
- CountryFest '97 (August 6, 1997)
- Snowden on Ice (November 28, 1997)
- Kathie Lee Gifford: We Need a Little Christmas (December 12, 1997)
- Christmas Concert of Hope (December 13, 1997)
- A Really Big Show: Ed Sullivan's 50th Anniversary (May 18, 1998)
- Sonny & Me: Cher Remembers (May 20, 1998)
- CBS: The First 50 Years (May 20, 1998)
- The Snowden, Raggedy Ann & Andy Holiday Show (November 27, 1998)
- Kathie Lee Gifford: Christmas Every Day (December 11, 1998)
- The Year Without a Santa Claus (December 12, 1998)
- Surprise Surprise Surprise (May 14, 1999)
- Sports Illustrated 20th Century Awards (December 2, 1999)
- Snowden's Christmas (December 3, 1999)
- The Nuttiest Nutcracker (December 3, 1999)
- Amy Grant Christmas Special: A Christmas to Remember (December 4, 1999)
- David Copperfield: The Great Escapes (April 26, 2000)
- Scott Hamilton's Farewell to Stars on Ice (December 15, 2000)
- Copperfield – Tornado of Fire (April 3, 2001)
- I Love Lucy: 50th Anniversary Special (November 11, 2001)
- Barbie in the Nutcracker (November 22, 2001)
- 'N SYNC Live! The Atlantis Concert (November 23, 2001)
- Rugrats: "The Santa Experience" and "Chanukah" (December 1, 2001)
- The Honeymooners: 50th Anniversary Celebration (May 6, 2002)
- The Mary Tyler Moore Reunion (May 13, 2002)
- Victoria's Secret Fashion Show (2002–03; 2005–17)
- The Andy Griffith Show Reunion: Back to Mayberry (November 11, 2003)
- The Dick Van Dyke Show Revisited (May 11, 2004)
- The Carol Burnett Show: Let's Bump Up the Lights! (May 12, 2004)
- Dallas Reunion: The Return to Southfork (November 7, 2004)
- The One Day at a Time Reunion (February 22, 2005)
- Knots Landing Reunion: Together Again (December 2, 2005)
- Dynasty Reunion: Catfights & Caviar (May 2, 2006)
- Grammy Awards: My Night at the Grammys (November 30, 2007)
- Movies Rock! A Celebration of Music and Film (December 7, 2007)
- The Flight Before Christmas (December 12, 2008)
- Yes, Virginia (December 11, 2009)
- Hoops & Yoyo Ruin Christmas (November 25, 2011)
- The Elf on the Shelf: An Elf's Story (November 25, 2011)
- It's a SpongeBob Christmas! (November 23, 2012)
- Garth Brooks, Live From Las Vegas (November 29, 2013)
- The Carol Burnett Show: 50th Anniversary Special (December 3, 2017)
- Reindeer in Here (November 29, 2022)

== Sports programming ==
- Major League Baseball on CBS (1947–1950, 1955–1965, 1990–1993)
- Thoroughbred Racing on CBS (1952–1985)
- NHL on CBS (1956–1960, 1966–1972, and 1980)
- Olympics on CBS (1960, 1992, 1994, 1998)
- Formula One (1960–1961, 1977–1981, 1983–1988, 2005–2006)
- NASCAR on CBS (1960–2000)
- NBA on CBS (1973–1990)
- NCAA Division I Women's Basketball Championship (1982–1995)
- College World Series on CBS (1988–2002)
- SEC on CBS (1996–2023)
- Indy Racing League on CBS (1997–1998)
- Showtime Championship Boxing (2012–2023) (co-production with Showtime Networks)
- SRX on CBS (2021–2022)
- WNBA on CBS (2019–2025)
