= Phil Roman =

American animator (born 1930)

- Born: Philip Roman; December 21, 1930 (age 95); Fresno, California, U.S.
- Occupations: Animator; director
- Years active: 1955–present
- Notable work: Peanuts; Garfield
- Spouse: Anita Tweedy
- Children: 1

Philip Roman (born December 21, 1930) is an American animator. He is the director of the Peanuts and Garfield animated specials and is the founder of the animation studios Film Roman and Phil Roman Entertainment.

== Early life ==
Philip Roman was born on December 21, 1930, in Fresno, California. His parents were Mexican migrant farm workers. He spoke only Spanish until kindergarten. After graduating from San Joaquin Memorial High School, he moved to Hollywood, California and earned a scholarship to the Hollywood Art Center School.

== Career ==
Roman begin his career in 1955 as an assistant animator for the Disney animated classic Sleeping Beauty. Early in his career, Roman was an animator for Chuck Jones's independent studios, Sib Tower 12 Productions and later Chuck Jones Productions. He was a lead animator for How the Grinch Stole Christmas!, and later provided an audio commentary with June Foray on the DVD release of the film. In the 1970s, Roman directed several of the Peanuts animated specials produced at Bill Melendez' studio.

In 1984, Roman founded his own animation studio, Film Roman, which produced the animation for the Garfield television specials. He directed all the twelve Garfield specials broadcast from 1982 to 1991. He also appeared in the documentary special Happy Birthday, Garfield, which went behind the scenes of both the comic strip and the animated versions of Garfield. In 1992, Roman became animation executive producer for The Simpsons, which his company started working on beginning with season four, taking over from Klasky Csupo, who animated the first three seasons. In the same year, he directed Tom and Jerry: The Movie, his studio's first theatrical feature.

In 1999, Roman sold his studio and later formed Phil Roman Entertainment. The company produced the animated special Grandma Got Run Over by a Reindeer. Roman has served as the production supervisor and executive producer in the Mexican-American animated film El Americano: The Movie, which was released in 2016. Following Film Roman's purchase by Waterman Entertainment in 2015, Roman returned to the company and founded as chairman emeritus until Steve Waterman terminated the company in 2018.

In 2016, Roman was honored with the Inkpot Award.

== Filmography ==
=== Television series ===
- Garfield and Friends (1988–1994) – executive producer
- Bobby's World (1990–1998) – executive producer
- Zazoo U (1990–1991) – executive producer
- The Simpsons (1992–1999) — animation executive producer
- Mother Goose and Grimm (1991–1993) – executive producer
- Mighty Max (1993–1994) – executive producer
- The Critic (1994–1995) — animation executive producer
- The Mask: The Animated Series (1995–1997) – executive producer
- Klutter (1995–1996) (as part of Eek! Stravaganza) – executive producer
- The Twisted Tales of Felix the Cat (1995–1997) – executive producer
- Richie Rich (1996) – executive producer
- Bruno the Kid (1996–1997) – executive producer
- King of the Hill (1997–1999) – animation executive producer
- Howdi Gaudi (2002) – executive producer

=== Television specials ===
- How the Grinch Stole Christmas! (1966) — animator
- He's Your Dog, Charlie Brown (1968) – graphic blandishment
- It Was a Short Summer, Charlie Brown (1969) – graphic blandishment
- Horton Hears a Who! (1970) – animator
- Dr. Seuss' The Cat in the Hat (1971) – animator
- You're Not Elected, Charlie Brown (1972) – graphic blandishment
- The Cricket in Times Square (1973) - animator
- There's No Time for Love, Charlie Brown (1973) – graphic blandishment
- A Charlie Brown Thanksgiving (1973) – director
- It's a Mystery, Charlie Brown (1974) – director
- It's the Easter Beagle, Charlie Brown (1974) – director
- Be My Valentine, Charlie Brown (1975) – director
- You're a Good Sport, Charlie Brown (1975) – director
- Happy Anniversary, Charlie Brown (1976) - animation director
- It's Arbor Day, Charlie Brown (1976) – director
- It's Your First Kiss, Charlie Brown (1977) – director
- What a Nightmare, Charlie Brown! (1978) – director
- You're the Greatest, Charlie Brown (1979) – director
- She's a Good Skate, Charlie Brown (1980) – director
- Life Is a Circus, Charlie Brown (1980) – director
- It's Magic, Charlie Brown (1981) – director
- Someday You'll Find Her, Charlie Brown (1981) – director
- No Man's Valley (1981) – co-director
- Here Comes Garfield (1982) – director
- Is This Goodbye, Charlie Brown? (1983) – director
- It's an Adventure, Charlie Brown (1983) – sequence director
- Garfield on the Town (1983) – director
- Garfield in the Rough (1984) – producer/director
- Garfield's Halloween Adventure (1985) – producer/director
- Garfield in Paradise (1986) – producer/director
- Garfield Goes Hollywood (1987) – producer/director
- A Garfield Christmas Special (1987) – producer/director
- Garfield: His 9 Lives (1988) – producer/director
- Garfield's Babes and Bullets (1989) – producer/director
- Garfield's Thanksgiving (1989) – producer/director
- Garfield's Feline Fantasies (1990) – producer/director
- Garfield Gets a Life (1991) – producer
- Grandma Got Run Over by a Reindeer (2000) – director

=== Films ===
- Sleeping Beauty (1959) – assistant animator (uncredited)
- A Boy Named Charlie Brown (1969) – animator (uncredited)
- The Phantom Tollbooth (1970) – animator (credited as Philip Roman)
- Snoopy Come Home (1972) – graphic blandishment
- Race for Your Life, Charlie Brown (1977) – co-director
- The Lord of the Rings (1978) – animator
- Bon Voyage, Charlie Brown (and Don't Come Back!!) (1980) – co-director
- Tom and Jerry: The Movie (1992) – producer/director
- La leyenda de la Nahuala (2007) – art adivsor
- El Americano: The Movie (2016) – producer/co-screenwriter
