= It's Arbor Day, Charlie Brown =

1976 Peanuts animated television special

- Genre: Animated television special
- Based on: Peanuts by Charles M. Schulz
- Written by: Charles M. Schulz
- Directed by: Phil Roman
- Voices of: Dylan Beach; Gail Davis; Sarah Beach; Stuart Brotman; Greg Felton; Liam Martin; Michelle Muller; Vinnie Dow; Bill Melendez
- Music by: Vince Guaraldi
- Opening theme: "Rerun's Lament"
- Ending theme: "Lucy's Home Run"
- Country of origin: United States
- Original language: English

Production
- Executive producer: Lee Mendelson
- Producer: Bill Melendez
- Editors: Chuck McCann; Roger Donley
- Running time: 25 minutes
- Production company: Lee Mendelson-Bill Melendez Productions

Original release
- Network: CBS
- Release: March 16, 1976

Related
- Happy Anniversary, Charlie Brown (1976); It's Your First Kiss, Charlie Brown (1977)

It's Arbor Day, Charlie Brown is the 15th prime-time animated television special based on Charles M. Schulz's comic strip Peanuts. The subject of the special is Arbor Day, a secular holiday devoted to planting trees. It's Arbor Day, Charlie Brown premiered on the CBS network on March 16, 1976, which is near the dates in which most U.S. states observe Arbor Day. This is the first special to feature the character Rerun van Pelt (younger brother to Linus and Lucy), who had debuted in the Peanuts comic strip in March 1973.

The musical score is notable for featuring the final compositions and recorded performances of jazz pianist and composer Vince Guaraldi, whose contributions to Peanuts include the theme "Linus and Lucy". Guaraldi died suddenly on February 6, 1976 prior to the special's premiere.

== Plot ==
Linus repairs his mother's bike with Charlie Brown watching. Linus' mother leaves with Rerun on the back seat. Rerun goes through all the places they are set to visit, including the Arbor Day meeting. After Sally Brown is humiliated in class for misunderstanding the purpose of Arbor Day (she defines it as "the day when all the ships come sailing into the arbor"), she is told that she has to write a full report on the subject, and Linus goes with her to the library to help her with the report. Linus leaves the library after Sally's repeated attempts to make him fall in love with her.

The scene cuts to Charlie Brown and Peppermint Patty talking under a tree. Peppermint Patty asks Charlie Brown to explain love to her, before she cuts him out several times. She switches the topic to baseball, going over the time her team plays his team, confident that she will win over him every time. Sally, Linus, Lucy, Snoopy and Woodstock decides to plant a lush garden—in Charlie Brown's baseball field, despite Linus' protests. Lucy then calls in the whole team to help with the planting. Charlie Brown is unaware on what is actually going on, and stays at home to work on his team's strategy.

The gang informs Charlie Brown that they will name the field Charlie Brown Field, to his happiness. He is shocked to find what has happened to the field when they show him. Charlie Brown tries to make the best of the situation by placing baseball gloves and caps on the trees to make them look like scarecrows. The trees catch so many fly outs, Peppermint Patty's team is unable to score, giving Charlie Brown's team the advantage. Schroeder tells Lucy that he will kiss her if she hits a home run. To Schroeder's surprise and Charlie Brown's delight, Lucy hits the home run and scores the first run of the game. After seeing Schroeder reluctantly cover his eyes and pucker his lips while randomly turning his head, Lucy refuses to kiss him. Moments later, Charlie Brown's joy turns to anguish as the game is rained out in a huge storm ruining the chance of his team winning their first game.

At school the next day, Sally gives a successful report on the true meaning of Arbor Day. Meanwhile, Peppermint Patty speaks kindly to a discouraged Charlie Brown, she compliments the garden in Charlie Brown Field and wishes him "Happy Arbor Day" as she holds his hand, cheering him up and making him blush.

== Cast ==
- Dylan Beach as Charlie Brown
- Gail M. Davis as Sally Brown
- Liam Martin as Linus van Pelt
- Sarah Beach as Lucy van Pelt
- Stuart Brotman as Peppermint Patty
- Greg Felton as Schroeder
- Michelle Muller as Frieda
- Vinnie Dow as Rerun van Pelt and Pig-Pen
- Bill Melendez as Snoopy and Woodstock
  - Peter Robbins: Charlie Brown/Peppermint Patty/Linus screaming (archived)

(Marcie, Franklin, Violet, and Patty appear in the film, but have no lines.)

== Production ==
Like the other Peanuts specials of the era, It's Arbor Day, Charlie Brown was directed by Phil Roman, and produced by Bill Melendez.

The special recycles animated sequences from Snoopy Come Home (1972), There's No Time for Love, Charlie Brown (1973), A Charlie Brown Thanksgiving (1973), It's a Mystery, Charlie Brown (1974) and You're a Good Sport, Charlie Brown (1975). It is also one of the few, if not the only, specials where Peppermint Patty and Sally call Charlie Brown by his full name.

This special is the only time Charlie Brown would be voiced by Dylan Beach (in his only acting role) as well as Lucy Van Pelt being voiced by Sarah Beach (both children of actor Scott Beach). The special's dialogue was recorded some time after the dialogue for Race for Your Life, Charlie Brown (1977), which also featured Scott Beach as a radio broadcaster. Most of the actors from the movie (with the exceptions of Duncan Watson as Charlie Brown, Melanie Kohn as Lucy, and Jimmy Ahrens as Marcie) returned for this special. At the same time, this was also the final special for Liam Martin, Gail Davis, Stuart Brotman and Greg Felton, voicing Linus, Sally, Peppermint Patty and Schroeder respectively. (Liam would come back one more time to voice Charlie Brown in What a Nightmare, Charlie Brown! (1978))

The Earth Day theme was revisited in It's the Small Things, Charlie Brown (2022).

== Music score ==
It's Arbor Day, Charlie Brown was the last Peanuts special to feature original music composed by Vince Guaraldi (except where noted), who was best known for the Peanuts signature tune, "Linus and Lucy." 47-year-old Guaraldi died suddenly on February 6, 1976, several hours after completing the soundtrack for this special. With the death of Guaraldi, later Peanuts animated specials lack the same jazzy musical score as previous entries. As such, It's Arbor Day, Charlie Brown is seen by some fans as the swan song of the "golden era" of Peanuts animation. In addition, it was the first Peanuts special since Charlie Brown's All Stars! (1966) that was not conducted and arranged by John Scott Trotter, who had died on October 29, 1975.

Guaraldi recorded the music score on January 28, February 3, and February 6, 1976 (the day of his death) at Wally Heider Studios, working as a trio with bassist Seward McCain and drummer Jim Zimmerman.

A remastered soundtrack album featuring original recordings and several bonus tracks was released for the first time on March 20, 2026, pairing It's Arbor Day... and Charlie Brown's All Stars! in a two-in-one collection.

== Reception and acknowledgement ==
Mick Martin and Marsha Porter of the Video Movie Guide gave the special 3 1/2 out of 5 stars and solemnly declared the composer Vince Guaraldi will be missed as "his last bow in the series". Martin and Porter have favored Guaraldi‘s composition as they described his jazz music a highlight for the series since in A Charlie Brown Christmas.

== Home media ==
It's Arbor Day, Charlie Brown was first released on VHS in 1987 by Kartes Video Communications. It was re-released by Paramount Home Video in 1996 and later on DVD-Video as a bonus feature on the 2003 release of It's the Easter Beagle, Charlie Brown (1974).

A remastered version was published on DVD by Warner Home Video in 2008 and the DVD box set Peanuts 1970's Collection, Vol. 2 in 2010.

On October 7, 2025, it was released on the DVD and Blu-Ray collection Peanuts: 75th Anniversary Ultimate TV Specials Collection along with 39 other Peanuts specials.
