= Race for Your Life, Charlie Brown =

1977 film directed by Bill Melendez and Phil Roman

- Theatrical release poster
- Directed by: Bill Melendez
- Written by: Charles M. Schulz
- Based on: Peanuts by Charles M. Schulz
- Produced by: Bill Melendez; Lee Mendelson
- Starring: Duncan Watson; Stuart Brotman; Gail Davis; Liam Martin; Melanie Kohn; Jimmy Ahrens; Kirk Jue; Jordan Warren; Tom Muller; Greg Felton; Bill Melendez
- Edited by: Roger Donley; Chuck McCann
- Music by: Ed Bogas
- Production companies: Lee Mendelson/Bill Melendez Productions; United Feature Syndicate
- Distributed by: Paramount Pictures
- Release dates: July 16, 1977 (Japan); August 3, 1977 (New York); August 24, 1977 (United States)
- Running time: 75 minutes
- Country: United States
- Language: English
- Box office: $3.2 million

Race for Your Life, Charlie Brown is a 1977 American animated adventure comedy film based on the Peanuts comic strip by Charles M. Schulz. Directed by Bill Melendez and written by Schulz, it is the third film in the Peanuts franchise. It was the first Peanuts feature-length film produced after the death of composer Vince Guaraldi, who was originally intended to score the film, and used the same voice cast from the 1975 and 1976 TV specials You're a Good Sport, Charlie Brown, Happy Anniversary, Charlie Brown, and It's Arbor Day, Charlie Brown, and the same voice cast member from the 1974 TV special It's a Mystery, Charlie Brown. However, Liam Martin voiced Linus van Pelt for the last time in the movie, and went on to voice Charlie Brown in the 1978 TV special What a Nightmare, Charlie Brown!. This would be Stuart Brotman's final role before his death from a brain aneurysm in 2011.

Unlike the previous two Peanuts theatrical films, Charles M. Schulz wrote an original plot without relying on any specific storyline from the strip. The idea for the film came to him during a family trip, during which he tried rafting with his wife on Rogue River. However, some gags were taken from the strip, such as the one where Snoopy and Peppermint Patty jump on the waterbed. The film received mixed reviews from critics.

== Plot ==
Charlie Brown and his friends ride on a bus to Camp Remote, an isolated camp situated in the mountains. Upon arrival, they are introduced to a trio of domineering bullies and their aggressive bobcat, Brutus. The camp organizes a series of challenges through which the children compete, concluded by a raft race that lasts multiple days. The Bullies, who have won every other competition through cheating, plan to win the raft race by equipping their raft with a outboard motor, radar, sonar, and a direction finder. They also employ underhanded tactics to sabotage their competitors.

The children are divided into three teams: the boys’ team, consisting of Charlie Brown, Linus, Schroeder, and Franklin; the girls’ team, led by Peppermint Patty and including Marcie, Sally, and Lucy; and Snoopy and Woodstock, who compete independently. Charlie Brown reluctantly assumes leadership of the boys’ team, doubting his abilities. Peppermint Patty, in contrast, is assertive but ineffective, insisting that all decisions be made through secret ballot votes. However, the results do not align with her preferences, prompting her to disregard them in favor of her own judgment. Meanwhile, the bullies’ arrogance results in an early misstep as they crash into a dock, losing valuable time.

Throughout the race, the children traverse a variety of landscapes, including dense forests, towering mountains, and a logging community built along a river. Along the way, they encounter numerous challenges such as getting lost, enduring severe storms, and suffering repeated sabotage at the hands of the bullies. During one particularly treacherous storm, Snoopy and Woodstock are separated. Snoopy searches tirelessly for Woodstock, eventually taking refuge in an abandoned cabin for the night. The next day, Snoopy leaves to search again. Meanwhile, the children, searching for Snoopy, stumble upon the cabin. When Snoopy, having found Woodstock, returns to the cabin, strife starts to form between the boys and girls over who should be able to stay the night in the cabin, ending with the girls forcing the boys out, making them sleep outside in the snow.

The next morning during breakfast between the two groups, the girls suggest getting a Christmas tree, having seemingly forgotten the race due to making no progress in the past few days. After Charlie Brown berates the girls for this, the Bullies are able to catch up to the group, subsequently destroying the boys wooden raft and leaving the girls inflatable raft stranded. After the girls' raft is recovered, both groups decide to merge out of necessity, with Charlie Brown being declared the leader. As they catch up with the bullies, Charlie Brown gains confidence within himself.

As the race nears its climax, the group appears poised for victory due to Charlie Brown's newfound self-assurance. However, their progress is derailed when Peppermint Patty prematurely initiates a celebration, inadvertently knocking the boys overboard. The girls attempt to rescue them but fall into the water themselves. Seizing the opportunity, the bullies revel in their imminent triumph. However, their consistent recklessness and internal disputes have weakened their raft, and just before reaching the finish line, it collapses and sinks.

With all other competitors eliminated, Snoopy and Woodstock remain the only ones in contention. Brutus attempts one final act of sabotage by puncturing Snoopy's inner tube. Undeterred, Woodstock swiftly constructs a makeshift raft using twigs and a leaf for a sail, continuing toward victory. When Brutus attempts to attack him, Snoopy intervenes, striking the bobcat and ensuring Woodstock's safe passage. Ultimately, Woodstock crosses the finish line first, securing victory. The bullies begrudgingly concede but vow revenge in the next year's race. Their threats are cut short when Snoopy subdues Brutus once more, sending him fleeing in terror.

As the children prepare to return home, Charlie Brown reflects on the experience, resolving to be more confident and assertive. However, before he can finish speaking, the bus departs without him (as was the case early on), forcing him to hitch an alternate ride with Snoopy and Woodstock on their motorcycle.

== Voice cast ==
- Duncan Watson as Charlie Brown
- Greg Felton as Schroeder and Camp Announcer
- Stuart Brotman as Peppermint Patty
- Gail Davis as Sally Brown
- Liam Martin as Linus Van Pelt
- Kirk Jue as Bully
- Jordan Warren as Bully
- Jimmy Ahrens as Marcie
- Melanie Kohn as Lucy Van Pelt
- Tom Muller as Franklin and Bully
- Bill Melendez as Snoopy and Woodstock
- Jackson Beck as Brutus (uncredited)
- Fred Van Amburg as Radio Announcer

== Reception ==
Metacritic, which uses a weighted average, assigned the film a score of 55 out of 100, based on 4 critics, indicating "mixed or average" reviews.

Race for Your Life, Charlie Brown received 3 out of 5 stars in The New York Times from Janet Maslin, who wrote: "The film runs an hour and quarter and has a rambling plot about a regatta, but it seems less like a continuous story than a series of droll blackout sketches, many of them ending with the obligatory 'Good Grief!' ... The net effect is that of having read the comic strip for an unusually long spell, which can amount to either a delightful experience or a pleasant but slightly wearing one, depending upon the intensity of one's fascination with the basic Peanuts mystique."

Leonard Maltin gave the movie 2.5 out of 4 stars (his lowest rating for the original four Peanuts movies), stating it's "mildly entertaining, but lacks punch".

== Home media ==
The film was released on VHS in 1979 as a Fotomat exclusive, Betamax the same year and LaserDisc in the early 1980s. It was also the very first release in 1981 on RCA's now defunct CED format. The VHS was released to mass markets in the early 1980s. It was released on VHS again with new artwork on August 17, 1994, and again on October 1, 1996, under the Paramount Family Favorites label. The film was released for the first time on DVD on February 10, 2015. It was released on Blu-ray as part of the four-film Snoopy Collection on May 18, 2021. The film was subsequently released as a standalone Blu-ray on March 15, 2022.

== See also ==
- Peanuts filmography
