= Be My Valentine, Charlie Brown =

1975 Peanuts animated television special

- Genre: Animated television special
- Based on: Peanuts by Charles M. Schulz
- Written by: Charles M. Schulz
- Directed by: Phil Roman
- Voices of: Duncan Watson; Melanie Kohn; Stephen Shea; Lynn Mortensen; Greg Felton; Bill Melendez; Linda Ercoli
- Music by: Vince Guaraldi
- Opening theme: "Heartburn Waltz"
- Ending theme: "Nocturne in E♭ major, Op. 9, No. 2"
- Country of origin: United States
- Original language: English

Production
- Executive producer: Lee Mendelson
- Producer: Bill Melendez
- Editors: Chuck McCann; Roger Donley
- Running time: 25 minutes
- Production companies: Lee Mendelson Film Productions; Bill Melendez Productions

Original release
- Network: CBS
- Release: January 28, 1975

Related
- It's the Easter Beagle, Charlie Brown (1974); You're a Good Sport, Charlie Brown (1975)

Be My Valentine, Charlie Brown is the 13th prime-time animated television special based on the comic strip Peanuts by Charles M. Schulz. It debuted in the United States on CBS on January 28, 1975.

It received an Emmy nomination for Outstanding Children's Special at the 27th Primetime Emmy Awards in 1975. It was one of two Peanuts specials nominated that year, along with It's the Easter Beagle, Charlie Brown. They lost to Yes, Virginia, there is a Santa Claus (another Bill Melendez production).

== Plot ==
Linus becomes infatuated with his teacher, Miss Othmar, and purchases a large, heart-shaped box of chocolates as a token of affection. Sally misinterprets his actions, assuming the gift is for her, and begins preparing a valentine in return. Meanwhile, Lucy attends a "pawpet" show staged by Snoopy and narrated by Charlie Brown, which explores the meaning of true love. At home, Sally struggles to create a proper valentine, prompting Charlie Brown to demonstrate how to cut a heart shape. However, Snoopy surpasses him by crafting a complex, music box-inspired valentine.

On Valentine's Day, the children gather to exchange cards and candy. Charlie Brown, optimistic about receiving several valentines, arrives with a briefcase. During the celebration, the group distributes their valentines, including a candy heart that—when read by Sally and interpreted by Snoopy—contains the full text of Elizabeth Barrett Browning's Sonnet 43. As the event ends, Charlie Brown receives nothing except a single candy heart inscribed with "FORGET IT, KID!" Linus also faces disappointment, having missed the chance to deliver his gift to Miss Othmar, who has left with her boyfriend.

Frustrated, Linus throws the box of chocolates off a bridge, where it is quickly eaten by Snoopy and Woodstock. Charlie Brown vents his disappointment by striking and attempting to kick his mailbox, injuring himself in the process.

The following day, Charlie Brown checks his mailbox again, hoping for a belated valentine from the Little Red-Haired Girl, but instead receives a surprise kiss from Snoopy. Later, Violet gives him a reused valentine with her name erased. Schroeder criticizes Violet and the others for their insensitivity and advises Charlie Brown not to accept such a pity gesture. Charlie Brown accepts it anyway. As he and Linus reflect at the brick wall, Charlie Brown expresses regret for ignoring Schroeder’s defense but remains hopeful that Violet’s gesture might lead to more recognition the next year. Linus cautions him against such optimism.

== Voice cast ==
- Duncan Watson as Charlie Brown
- Melanie Kohn as Lucy van Pelt
- Stephen Shea as Linus van Pelt
- Lynn Mortensen as Sally Brown
- Greg Felton as Schroeder
- Linda Ercoli as Violet/Frieda
- Bill Melendez as Snoopy/Woodstock

== Music score ==
The music score for Be My Valentine, Charlie Brown was composed by Vince Guaraldi and conducted/arranged by John Scott Trotter. It was recorded by the Vince Guaraldi Trio on December 9, 17, 18, 23, and 30, 1974, at Wally Heider Studios, featuring Guaraldi (piano, electric piano, Minimoog, ARP String Ensemble, electric guitar), Seward McCain (electric bass), and Vince Lateano (drums).

Prior to the complete soundtrack release, select cues appeared on compilation albums. A mono version of "Heartburn Waltz" (5th reprise) sourced directly from the television soundtrack was issued on Charlie Brown's Holiday Hits (1998), marking the first general release of music from the special. Additional cues sourced from mid-2000s reel-to-reel discoveries, including "Never Again" and "Charlie's Wake Up", were featured on Vince Guaraldi and the Lost Cues from the Charlie Brown Television Specials, Volume 2 (2008).

On January 17, 2025, the complete original remastered recordings were officially released by Lee Mendelson Film Productions in honor of the special's 50th anniversary, presenting the full score and several previously unreleased tracks for the first time.

== Television ==
The special placed in the top 20 for television ratings in its first airing in 1975. It aired annually on CBS from 1975 to 2000.

After the original special aired in 1975, many children sent Charlie Brown valentines via Charles Schulz.

== Production ==
This marks the final time that Stephen Shea and Lynn Mortensen voice Linus and Sally respectively in the specials (The former ending his tenure of being in the most Peanuts media out of any other child actor as the character, voicing in seven specials and a movie from 1971-1975). This also marks the first special for Duncan Watson and Greg Felton, voicing Charlie Brown and Schroeder respectively.

== Home media ==
The special was released on the CED format in 1982 along with It's the Easter Beagle, Charlie Brown, He's Your Dog, Charlie Brown, and Life Is a Circus, Charlie Brown. It was released on VHS in 1986 and 1988, from Media Home Entertainment and its Hi-Tops Video subsidiary, respectively, through the "Snoopy's Home Video Library" collection. That release cut out the opening scene in which Snoopy shoots arrows. It was released again in its entirety by Paramount Home Video on January 11, 1995, and was re-released in clamshell packaging on October 1, 1996. Paramount released the special on January 7, 2003 on DVD with You're in Love, Charlie Brown and It's Your First Kiss, Charlie Brown. It was rereleased on January 15, 2008 by Warner Home Video in a "remastered deluxe edition" with a new bonus featurette, "Unlucky in Love: An Unrequited Love Story". It has been released on laserdisc, and is available on iTunes.

On October 7, 2025, it was released on the DVD and Blu-Ray collection Peanuts: 75th Anniversary Ultimate TV Specials Collection along with 39 other Peanuts specials.
