= You're a Good Sport, Charlie Brown =

1975 Peanuts animated television special

- Genre: Animated television special
- Based on: Peanuts by Charles M. Schulz
- Directed by: Phil Roman
- Voices of: Duncan Watson; Gail M. Davis Liam Martin Melanie Kohn; Bill Melendez; Jimmy Ahrens; Stuart Brotman
- Music by: Vince Guaraldi
- Opening theme: "Motocross"
- Ending theme: "Motocross" (4th Reprise)
- Country of origin: United States
- Original language: English

Production
- Executive producer: Lee Mendelson
- Producer: Bill Melendez
- Editors: Chuck McCann; Roger Donley
- Running time: 25 minutes
- Production companies: Lee Mendelson Film Productions; Bill Melendez Productions

Original release
- Network: CBS
- Release: October 28, 1975

Related
- Be My Valentine, Charlie Brown (1975); Happy Anniversary, Charlie Brown (1976)

You're a Good Sport, Charlie Brown is the 14th prime-time animated television special based on the comic strip Peanuts by Charles M. Schulz. It originally aired on the CBS network on October 28, 1975. In this special, Charlie Brown, Snoopy, and Peppermint Patty participate in a motocross race.

This was the final Peanuts special scored by John Scott Trotter, and penultimate with music by Vince Guaraldi.

== Plot ==
Snoopy and Woodstock engage in a spirited tennis match, while Linus and Sally are unable to play due to the courts being occupied. Sally attempts to intimidate the players by referring to her 'boyfriend' who will deal with them, prompting Linus to flee in embarrassment. Following his defeat, Snoopy destroys his racket in frustration.

Peppermint Patty soon arrives and informs the group of an upcoming motocross race. She encourages Charlie Brown and Snoopy to participate. Linus volunteers as their pit crew, and together they use their limited resources to purchase an old, unreliable motorcycle. Snoopy enters under the pseudonym 'The Masked Marvel,' with Marcie serving as the event announcer.

At the start of the race, both Charlie Brown and Snoopy crash at the first turn and are taken away for medical attention: Snoopy to a hospital, and Charlie Brown mistakenly to a veterinary clinic. After regaining consciousness, Charlie Brown escapes the vet's office and retrieves Snoopy from the hospital.

Back at the track, Linus reminds Charlie Brown that a helmet is required to continue racing. With his original helmet lost, Linus improvises one using a hollowed-out pumpkin. Though reluctant and humiliated, Charlie Brown returns to the course.

As the race progresses, other competitors gradually fall out due to mechanical failures and mud traps. Despite his outdated equipment and slow speed, Charlie Brown endures and is the only racer to cross the finish line. However, race officials reveal that the promised grand prize — tickets to the Pro Bowl — is unavailable. As a substitute, Charlie Brown receives a kiss from Loretta, the unremarkable 'Motocross Queen', and a certificate for five free haircuts—an ironic reward, given that his father is a barber and he has little hair himself.

Linus consoles him, affirming that winning through persistence is more meaningful than any material prize. Uplifted, Charlie Brown expresses newfound confidence.

In the final scene, he prepares to pitch a baseball game, declaring that despite 980 consecutive defeats, he now understands what it means to win. A line drive immediately knocks him out of his clothes, restoring the familiar pattern of comic failure.

== Voice cast ==
- Duncan Watson as Charlie Brown
  - Peter Robbins – Charlie Brown's screaming voice (archived)
- Liam Martin as Linus van Pelt
- Gail Davis as Sally Brown
- Melanie Kohn as Lucy van Pelt and Loretta
- Stuart Brotman as Peppermint Patty
- Jimmy Ahrens as Marcie
- Bill Melendez as Snoopy/Woodstock

== Production notes ==
=== Voice talent ===
Most of the voice cast (with the exceptions of Duncan Watson as Charlie Brown, Melanie Kohn as Lucy, Greg Felton as Schroeder and Jimmy Ahrens as Marcie) had an overhaul after Be My Valentine, Charlie Brown (1975). Linus, Sally and Peppermint Patty are now voiced by Liam Martin, Gail Davis, and Stuart Brotman respectively. The voice cast here would later be used for the movie Race for Your Life, Charlie Brown (1977).

== Music score ==
You're a Good Sport, Charlie Brown was the final Peanuts television special to air during Vince Guaraldi's lifetime. Guaraldi died of a sudden heart attack on February 6, 1976, just hours after completing music cues for It's Arbor Day, Charlie Brown, which aired posthumously on March 16, 1976. You're a Good Sport, Charlie Brown was also the last special arranged and conducted by longtime collaborator John Scott Trotter, who died on October 29, 1975, one day after the broadcast. Trotter had worked alongside Guaraldi on all Peanuts specials since It's the Great Pumpkin, Charlie Brown (1966).

The score marked a stylistic departure for Guaraldi, blending his signature jazz idiom with 1970s funk, disco, and pop influences. Notably, the arrangements featured the Clavinet, ARP String Ensemble, and Rhythm Ace drum machine. All cues were composed by Guaraldi and recorded at Wally Heider Studios on September 12, 18, and 19, 1975, with Seward McCain (electric bass) and Mark Rosengarden (drums, güiro).

In the mid-2000s, David Guaraldi discovered a trove of analog reel-to-reel tapes from his father's personal archive. Although not the original master session reels, these recordings preserved several Peanuts scores from the 1970s, including material from You're a Good Sport, Charlie Brown. Select tracks such as "Motocross" (version 3) and "You're a Good Sport, Charlie Brown (Centercourt)" appeared on the compilation Vince Guaraldi and the Lost Cues from the Charlie Brown Television Specials (2007), while a live version of "You're a Good Sport, Charlie Brown (Centercourt)" had previously appeared on Oaxaca (2004).

To commemorate the special's 50th anniversary, a fully remastered edition of the complete soundtrack was released on July 11, 2025, across CD, digital, and vinyl formats. Notably, the vinyl release debuted as the first Peanuts soundtrack issued as a 45 RPM Zoetrope picture disc, featuring stroboscopic animation on the surface that synchronizes visually when played at proper speed, a nod to both retro charm and modern vinyl artistry.

== Home media ==
On October 7, 2025, the special was released on the DVD and Blu-Ray collection Peanuts: 75th Anniversary Ultimate TV Specials Collection along with 39 other Peanuts specials.

== Awards ==
You're a Good Sport, Charlie Brown won Schulz his third Emmy Award for Outstanding Children Special. He previously earned the award for A Charlie Brown Christmas and A Charlie Brown Thanksgiving.
