= Duncan Watson =

American former child voice actor (born 1963)

- Born: Duncan Pepper Watson; 1963 (age 62–63); Montclair, New Jersey, U.S.
- Education: University of New Hampshire Antioch New England Graduate School
- Occupations: Assistant Public Works Director; voice actor
- Years active: 1975–1977 (voice actor); 1992–2025 (public works)
- Children: 2

Duncan P. Watson (born 1963) is an American former assistant public works director and former child voice actor, who is known for voicing Charlie Brown from 1975 to 1977.

== Early life ==
Duncan P. Watson was born in Montclair, New Jersey in 1963, he spend most of his life living in Mexico, California and Utah before eventually moving to New Hampshire. He graduated from the University of New Hampshire in 1985.

== Career ==
Watson begin his acting career in 1975 at the age of twelve years old when he was cast as the fifth official voice actor of the Peanuts character Charlie Brown. He voiced Charlie in Be My Valentine, Charlie Brown, You're a Good Sport, Charlie Brown and in Happy Anniversary, Charlie Brown. He then returned to voice the same character in the feature-length movie Race for Your Life, Charlie Brown, which was also his final acting role. Watson also voiced the character Franklin in You're A Good Sport Charlie Brown.

In November 2024, Watson published his first book, "Everyone's Trash, One Man Vs. 1.6 Billion Pounds", Peter Randall Publishers.

From 1992 through 2025 he worked as the assistant director of Public Works in Keene, New Hampshire.

== Personal life ==
Watson lives in Southwest, NH. He has two adult daughters, Samantha Ann and Selma Marie.

== Filmography ==
Year	Title	Role	Notes
1975	Be My Valentine, Charlie Brown	Charlie Brown (voice)	Television special
1975	You're a Good Sport, Charlie Brown	Charlie Brown (voice)	Television special
1976	Happy Anniversary, Charlie Brown	Charlie Brown (voice)	Television documentary
1977	Race for Your Life, Charlie Brown	Charlie Brown (voice)	Film
