= Happy Birthday, Charlie Brown =

1979 animated television special

- Genre: Documentary
- Created by: Peanuts by Charles M. Schulz
- Written by: Lee Mendelson
- Directed by: Lee Mendelson
- Presented by: Phyllis George
- Voices of: Arrin Skelley; Daniel Anderson; Annalisa Bortolin; Bill Melendez; Michelle Muller; Ronald Hendrix; Laura Planting; Casey Carlson; Don Potter
- Theme music composer: Vince Guaraldi
- Composers: Ed Bogas; Judy Munsen
- Country of origin: United States
- Original language: English

Production
- Producer: Lee Mendelson
- Editors: Paul Preuss; Chuck McCann
- Running time: 60 minutes
- Production company: Lee Mendelson Film Productions

Original release
- Network: CBS
- Release: January 5, 1979

Related
- What a Nightmare, Charlie Brown! (1978); You're the Greatest, Charlie Brown (1979)

Happy Birthday, Charlie Brown is a prime-time animated TV special based upon the comic strip Peanuts, by Charles M. Schulz. It was originally aired on the CBS network on January 5, 1979.

This episode celebrated the 30th anniversary of the Peanuts comic strip and the 15th anniversary of animated Peanuts specials on CBS, which both took place the following year, in 1980. It included an interview with Charles M. Schulz. Phyllis George hosted.

This special followed a 25th anniversary special, Happy Anniversary, Charlie Brown, which aired in 1976. It features a sneak preview of the Peanuts feature-length film, Bon Voyage, Charlie Brown (and Don't Come Back!!), which was released in 1980.

== Voice actors ==
- Arrin Skelley: Charlie Brown
- Daniel Anderson: Linus Van Pelt
- Annalisa Bortolin: Sally Brown
- Bill Melendez: Snoopy & Woodstock
- Michelle Muller: Lucy Van Pelt
- Ronald Hendrix: Franklin
- Laura Planting: Peppermint Patty
- Casey Carlson: Marcie
- Don Potter: Snoopy (singing voice)
