= Melanie Kohn =

American actress (b. 1964)

- Born: March 20, 1964 (age 61); United States
- Occupation: Voice actress
- Years active: 1974–1977
- Family: Robin Kohn (sister)

Melanie Kohn (born March 20, 1964) is a former child actress noted for voicing Lucy van Pelt during the 1970s.

== Career ==
Kohn, a native of San Francisco, voiced the character in It's a Mystery, Charlie Brown, It's the Easter Beagle, Charlie Brown, Be My Valentine, Charlie Brown and You're a Good Sport, Charlie Brown (for which she also provided the voice of Loretta).

She returned to voice the same character in the feature-length film Race for Your Life, Charlie Brown. Melanie Kohn is the sister of Robin Kohn, who has also voiced Lucy van Pelt.

== Filmography ==
| Year | Title | Role | Notes |
|---|---|---|---|
| 1974 | It's a Mystery, Charlie Brown | Lucy van Pelt (voice) | Television special |
| 1974 | It's the Easter Beagle, Charlie Brown' | Lucy van Pelt (voice) | Television special |
| 1975 | Be My Valentine, Charlie Brown | Lucy van Pelt (voice) | Television special |
| 1975 | You're a Good Sport, Charlie Brown | Lucy van Pelt, Loretta (voices) | Television special |
| 1977 | Race for Your Life, Charlie Brown | Lucy van Pelt (voice) | Film |
