= No Man's Valley =

1981 American animated TV special

- Title card
- Written by: Christopher Brough and Frank Buxton
- Directed by: Bill Melendez
- Starring: Henry Corden; Frank Buxton; Art Metrano; Hal Smith; Chanin Hale; Arnold Stang; Barney Phillips; Joe E. Ross; Desirée Goyette; Richard Deacon; John Stephenson
- Theme music composer: Desirée Goyette and Ed Bogas
- Country of origin: United States

Production
- Executive producers: Lee Mendelson and Phil Howort
- Producer: Bill Melendez
- Editors: Charles McCann; Roger Donley
- Running time: 25 minutes
- Production companies: Mendelson/Melendez Productions; Frank Fehmers Productions; The Rights Company of North America

Original release
- Network: CBS
- Release: November 23, 1981

No Man's Valley is an animated TV special written by Christopher Brough and Frank Buxton. It was originally aired on the CBS network November 23, 1981. It was executive produced by Lee Mendelson and Phil Howort, produced and directed by Bill Melendez, and co-directed by Phil Roman.

== Synopsis ==
Elliot, a rare California condor, must find a hideaway for endangered animals before humans drive them over the brink into extinction.

== Voice cast ==
- Henry Corden as Chief
- Frank Buxton as Elliot
- Art Metrano as Abe
- Hal Smith as George
- Chanin Hale as Nipponia
- Arnold Stang as Fred Firmwing
- Barney Phillips as Pere David
- Joe E. Ross as Daniel
- Desirée Goyette as Pat
- Richard Deacon as Panda
- John Stephenson as Herman

=== Uncredited ===
- Hal Smith as Louis
- John Stephenson as Protester

== Credits ==
- Executive Producers: Lee Mendelson, Phil Howort
- Written by: Christopher Brough and Frank Buxton
- Creative Consultant: David Hooper
- Original Music by: Desirée Goyette
- Music Arranged and Conducted by: Ed Bogas
- A Lee Mendelson-Phil Howort Production
  - In association with Bill Melendez Productions and Frank Fehmers Productions
- Produced and Directed by: Bill Melendez
- Based on an original idea by: Harrie Geelen and Imme Dros
- And original art concepts by: Michael Jupp and Elsa Godfrey
- Co-Directed by: Phil Roman
- "Welcome to No Man's Valley" sung by: Desirée Goyette
- Production Designed by: Bernie Gruver, Evert Brown
- Color by: Dean Spille
- Animation by: Sam Jaimes, Bob Carlson, Al Pabian, Bill Littlejohn, Hank Smith, Fernando Gonzalez, Joe Roman, Larry Leichliter, Dale Baer, Utit Choomuang
- Checking: Eve Fletcher, Joanne Lansing, Jane Gonzales
- Ink and Paint: Adele Lenart, Micky Kreymann, Karin Holmquist, Roubina Janian, Valerie Green, Joan Pabian, Karen Webb, Lee Hoffman, Emalene Seutter, Chandra Poweris
- Editing: Chuck McCann, Roger Donley
- Dialogue Editing: Les Wolf
- Production Manager: Carole Barnes
- Production Assistants: Sandy Claxton Arnold, Carol Neal, Jane Mason
- Camera: Nick Vasu
- Mix: Producers' Sound Service
- Color: Technicolor

== Production ==
- This was the final project of Joe E. Ross.
