= It's Your First Kiss, Charlie Brown =

1977 television special

- Genre: Animated television special
- Created by: Charles M. Schulz
- Written by: Charles M. Schulz
- Directed by: Phil Roman
- Voices of: Arrin Skelley; Daniel Anderson; Michelle Muller; Ronald Hendrix; Laura Planting; Roseline Rubens; Sarah Beach; Casey Carlson; Gail M. Davis; Hilary Momberger; Bill Melendez
- Theme music composer: Vince Guaraldi
- Opening theme: "Linus and Lucy"
- Composers: Ed Bogas; Judy Munsen; Vince Guaraldi
- Country of origin: United States
- Original language: English

Production
- Executive producer: Lee Mendelson
- Producer: Bill Melendez
- Editors: Chuck McCann; Roger Donley
- Running time: 24 minutes
- Production companies: Lee Mendelson Film Productions; Bill Melendez Productions

Original release
- Network: CBS
- Release: October 24, 1977

Related
- It's Arbor Day, Charlie Brown (1976); What a Nightmare, Charlie Brown! (1978)

It's Your First Kiss, Charlie Brown is the 16th prime-time animated television special based on the comic strip Peanuts by Charles M. Schulz. It originally aired on October 24, 1977, on the CBS-TV network. In this special, Charlie Brown worries when he is chosen to kiss his crush in a homecoming parade.

The special was directed by Phil Roman and produced by Bill Melendez. It was the first Peanuts television special produced following the death of composer and jazz pianist Vince Guaraldi, who died on February 6, 1976, a year before the special began airing. Following Guaraldi's death, the music was composed by Ed Bogas.

== Plot ==
Charlie Brown's school has their annual Homecoming parade and football game. He and Linus, as well as their team, would serve as the escorts for the Queen and her court. During the parade, Linus mentions that Charlie Brown himself will be escorting the Queen who, to Charlie Brown's shock, is the Little Red-Haired Girl herself, revealed to be Heather. But when Linus adds the Homecoming tradition of giving the queen a kiss in front of everyone before the first dance, Charlie Brown hyperventilates and falls off the float.

The game begins with Charlie Brown as kicker and Lucy as his placekick setter. But even in a real football game, Lucy still humiliates Charlie Brown, pulling the ball away four times during the game as he tries to kick it, including a crucial field goal attempt in the last thirty seconds. The team loses by one point, and Charlie Brown is wrongfully blamed by team captain Peppermint Patty, joined by Lucy and Frieda at the ballroom that evening. Despite the indignity, Charlie Brown remains faithful to his duty and escorts Heather to the middle of the dance floor, and then summons the courage to kiss her on the cheek. From that moment forward Charlie Brown is in a euphoric state until, the first thing he knows, he finds himself falling into his own bed.

Charlie Brown wakes up the next morning with no memory of what happened after the kiss. He meets with Linus, who tells him that he surprised everyone when he kissed Heather, but even more so when he took to the dance floor with her and the other girls in the court doing all of the latest dances. Linus sums it all up saying that though they lost the game, Charlie Brown took the honors at the dance. In disbelief, Charlie Brown replies, "What good is it to do anything, Linus, if you can't remember what you did?" Regardless, Linus reminds him that at least it was his first kiss and the story ends with him smiling with quiet satisfaction.

== Voice cast ==
- Arrin Skelley as Charlie Brown
- Daniel Anderson as Linus van Pelt
- Michelle Muller as Lucy van Pelt
- Laura Planting as Peppermint Patty
- Roseline Rubens as Frieda
- Ronald Hendrix as Franklin, Pig-Pen and Shermy
- Sarah Beach, Casey Carlson and Gail M. Davis as the cheerleaders
- Bill Melendez as Snoopy and Woodstock

== Critical reception ==
There were two elements from this special that caused negative reactions from viewers:

- The Little Red-Haired Girl was never seen in the daily comics (except in silhouette in a later strip from May 1998), nor was she ever referred to by her real name. Schulz himself admitted that he could not draw her to readers' satisfaction, much less his own, but the storyline of the TV special forced the issue.
- In the special's initial broadcast, Charlie Brown was blamed by most of his teammates (especially Peppermint Patty and Lucy) for bungling kicks and losing the game, though it was clearly obvious that Lucy was the culprit. Many viewers protested; while they could accept Lucy pulling the ball away, they could not accept Charlie Brown being blamed for the loss. As a result, in all subsequent broadcasts and home video releases, the offending lines by Peppermint Patty ("Okay, Chuck, you really goofed up on that play!" and "Chuck, you can't do anything right!") were made lower and backmasked.

== Home media ==
On October 7, 2025, it was released on the DVD and Blu-Ray collection Peanuts: 75th Anniversary Ultimate TV Specials Collection along with 39 other Peanuts specials.
