= Happy Birthday, Garfield =

1988 American TV special

- Written by: Jim Davis
- Directed by: Jim Davis
- Presented by: Jim Davis
- Starring: Lorenzo Music; Gregg Berger; Thom Huge
- Narrated by: Gregg Berger
- Music by: John Powell
- Country of origin: United States
- Original language: English

Production
- Producer: Jim Davis
- Cinematography: Michael Knapp
- Editor: Harry Hinter
- Running time: 48 minutes
- Production company: Paws, Inc.

Original release
- Network: CBS
- Release: May 17, 1988

Related
- A Garfield Christmas; Garfield: His 9 Lives

Happy Birthday, Garfield is an hour-long television special dedicated to the tenth anniversary of the Garfield comic strip, hosted by its creator Jim Davis. The special was first broadcast in the United States on May 17, 1988 on CBS, and in the United Kingdom on February 24, 1989 on ITV as part of Children's ITV. It uses both live-action and animation.

== Synopsis ==
The program featured the people behind the strips and animated adaptations, which include

- A very brief animated short made in 1980 from The Fantastic Funnies (two years before Here Comes Garfield) by Bill Melendez and Lee Mendelson (well known for their Peanuts specials) featuring jokes from the strips of June 21 and August 2, 1978 and July 21, 1979.
- A recording session for the then-upcoming Garfield and Friends series (with Lorenzo Music, Gregg Berger and Thom Huge), apart from some footage from it and from Garfield: His 9 Lives.
- Spanish and German-dubbed clips of Here Comes Garfield and Garfield Goes Hollywood respectively were shown.
- A sneak peek for the unproduced feature film Garfield's Judgment Day.
- A rehearsal for the theme song of Garfield's Babes and Bullets.
- A chat Davis has with Dik Browne (Hägar the Horrible, Hi and Lois), Mike Peters (Mother Goose and Grimm) and Lynn Johnston (For Better or For Worse). The last part of the program features the celebrations held for the strip's anniversary, most notably the one where fellow cartoonists drew their characters as their "presents", followed by man-in-the-street interviews about Garfield, before the camera shows him and Odie (both played by human actors) living the "good life" in Hollywood (even Garfield takes his time to kick Odie). Finally, Davis acknowledges the audience before flying off on a Garfield-shaped hot air balloon.
