= Happy Anniversary, Charlie Brown =

1976 animated television documentary

- Genre: Documentary
- Based on: Peanuts by Charles M. Schulz
- Developed by: Bill Melendez
- Written by: Lee Mendelson
- Directed by: Lee Mendelson
- Presented by: Carl Reiner
- Voices of: Duncan Watson; Gail Davis; Liam Martin; Lynn Mortensen; Greg Felton; Bill Melendez; Linda Ercoli; Stuart Brotman; James Ahrens
- Music by: Vince Guaraldi
- Opening theme: "Linus and Lucy"
- Ending theme: "Linus and Lucy"
- Country of origin: United States
- Original language: English

Production
- Executive producer: Lee Mendelson
- Producers: Warren Lockhart; Lee Mendelson
- Editors: Paul Preuss; Chuck McCann
- Running time: 60 minutes
- Production companies: Lee Mendelson Film Productions; Bill Melendez Productions

Original release
- Network: CBS
- Release: January 9, 1976

Related
- You're a Good Sport, Charlie Brown (1975); It's Arbor Day, Charlie Brown (1976)

Happy Anniversary, Charlie Brown is an animated TV documentary that celebrates 25 years of the Peanuts comic strip. The special first aired January 9, 1976 on CBS. The special includes clips from the previous 14 Peanuts specials and the then-upcoming film Race for Your Life, Charlie Brown, as well as interview segments with creator Charles M. Schulz, with narration by Carl Reiner.

The voice cast in this special (excluding Lynn Mortensen and Linda Ercoli) reprised their roles in Race for Your Life, Charlie Brown (1977).

A 30th anniversary special, Happy Birthday, Charlie Brown, followed in 1979.

== Voice actors ==
- Duncan Watson as Charlie Brown
- Lynn Mortensen as Lucy Van Pelt. Mortensen previously voiced Sally Brown from 1974-1975.
- Liam Martin as Linus Van Pelt
- Gail M. Davis as Sally Brown
- Greg Felton as Schroeder
- Stuart Brotman as Peppermint Patty
- James Ahrens as Marcie
- Linda Ercoli as Violet
- Bill Melendez as Snoopy, Woodstock
