= What a Nightmare, Charlie Brown! =

1978 animated television special directed by Bill Melendez, Phil Roman

- Genre: Animated television special
- Created by: Peanuts by Charles M. Schulz
- Directed by: Phil Roman; Bill Melendez
- Voices of: Liam Martin; Bill Melendez
- Theme music composer: Vince Guaraldi
- Opening theme: "Linus and Lucy"
- Composer: Ed Bogas
- Country of origin: United States
- Original language: English

Production
- Executive producer: Lee Mendelson
- Producer: Bill Melendez
- Editors: Roger Donley; Chuck McCann
- Running time: 24 minutes
- Production companies: Lee Mendelson Film Productions; Bill Melendez Productions

Original release
- Network: CBS
- Release: February 23, 1978

Related
- It's Your First Kiss, Charlie Brown (1977); Happy Birthday, Charlie Brown (1979)

What a Nightmare, Charlie Brown! is the 17th prime-time animated television special based on the comic strip Peanuts by Charles M. Schulz. It originally aired on Thursday, February 23, 1978, at 8:00 P.M. ET/PT on CBS. The special is unusual in that Snoopy and Charlie Brown are the only members of the Peanuts cast to appear in it. The plot is similar to that of Jack London's The Call of the Wild, and it centers on Snoopy having a nightmare about being an Arctic sled dog. This was the first special Bill Melendez directed since 1973's A Charlie Brown Thanksgiving.

== Plot ==
One winter day, Charlie Brown is trying to pretend to be a musher with Snoopy, but the dog has other ideas and gets Charlie Brown to pull while he has fun riding in the sled. When night comes and they are comfortably indoors, Charlie Brown is indignant that Snoopy is adjusting too well to home life, reminding Snoopy of the facts that Arctic dogs are only fed once a day, their meals largely consisting of cold meat and raw fish (to which Snoopy blanches and gives a look of "it's too bad to be them") and coming to the conclusion that Snoopy is "an overly civilized, underly 'dogified' dog". Snoopy makes a sumptuous dinner of five pizzas, vegetables and a milkshake, to which Charlie Brown retorts he hopes Snoopy can digest all that food. Snoopy then falls asleep atop his doghouse, but when he wakes up he finds himself in a polar region, to which he is made a sled dog for the Iditarod Trail Sled Dog Race in Alaska, presumably during the Klondike Gold Rush or the 1925 serum run to Nome.

Snoopy is cruelly mistreated, being run ragged by his owner (who is only seen in shadow or silhouette and only speaks in a much deeper version of the classic Peanuts adult "waa-waa-waa" language) and his quintet of the larger dogs. They deny Snoopy any food or water and take turns barking loudly at him to let him know he is indeed an outsider. One scene which breaks the snow scenes is where the sled master stops at a honky tonk, and a hungry Snoopy sneaks inside to snatch a sandwich and a mug of root beer sitting near a piano, where he feigns playing John Philip Sousa's "The Washington Post March". Snoopy later tries his hand at a game of poker, where he keeps a poker face until he laughs out loud revealing his improbable winning hand of five aces, which causes a brawl and leaves Snoopy to escape into the next room. He finds himself on stage with a painted backdrop of Paris and is cheered for his dancing. However, when the music changes and he impersonates a can-can dancer, Snoopy is thrown out of the bar and is back with the sled dogs, where he continues to be mistreated.

Unable to take any more, that night Snoopy breaks down crying, then once he's done he goes about converting to his "new life" to survive, baring his fangs and falling to walking on all fours. Snoopy challenges the lead dog to a fight and wins, becoming the "Alpha Male" of the sled dog pack. He also turns the tables on the rest of the dogs by denying them food and water. Eventually, he leads his owner over an ice-covered lake where the ice cracks and causes all the sled dogs and the owner to be swallowed into the water. Snoopy finds himself being pulled into the hole. As he grapples screaming for his life, Snoopy wakes up clinging to the side of his doghouse and is relieved that he was just having a nightmare. Snoopy later wakes Charlie Brown up and recounts his nightmare in pantomime, to which Charlie Brown allows Snoopy to spend the night inside with him, but not before Snoopy helps himself to a large ice cream sundae, reminding himself that his Arctic experience was indeed a nightmare.

== Voice cast ==
- Bill Melendez as Snoopy
- Liam Martin as Charlie Brown

== Home media ==
In June 2010, the special debuted on DVD as part of the Peanuts 1970's Collection, Volume Two set by Warner Home Video. Before that it was released on CED format in 1983, and on VHS by Media Home Entertainment in 1985, Hi-Tops Video in 1988, and on September 6, 1995 by Paramount Home Entertainment along with It's Magic, Charlie Brown. The special occasionally saw airings on the American TV channel Nickelodeon from 1998 to 2000 as part of Nickelodeon's umbrella branding for Peanuts programming, You're on Nickelodeon, Charlie Brown!.

On October 7, 2025, it was released on the DVD and Blu-Ray collection Peanuts: 75th Anniversary Ultimate TV Specials Collection along with 39 other Peanuts specials.
