= Heavy Traffic (disambiguation) =

Heavy Traffic is a 1973 American drama film. It may also refer to:

- Heavy Traffic (soundtrack), a soundtrack to the 1973 film
- Heavy Traffic (album), an album by Status Quo
- Heavy Traffic (magazine), a literary magazine based in New York City
- Traffic congestion
