= Heavy Traffic (soundtrack) =

Soundtrack album by Ed Bogas and Ray Shanklin
- Released: 1973
- Recorded: May 1973
- Genre: Soul jazz
- Length: 39:57
- Label: Fantasy
- Producer: Steve Krantz Animation, Inc.

Professional ratings
Review scores
Source	Rating
AllMusic	3/5 stars

Heavy Traffic is the soundtrack to Ralph Bakshi's 1973 film Heavy Traffic. The film's score was performed by Ed Bogas and Ray Shanklin. The soundtrack album was released by Fantasy Records in 1973. The album was released on compact disc in 1996 as part of a compilation that featured the soundtracks to both Fritz the Cat and Heavy Traffic on the one disc.

== Track listing ==
1. Scarborough Fair (P.D., arr. Simon & Garfunkel)
  - Performed by Sérgio Mendes and Brasil '66
2. Scarborough Street Fair (P.D., arr. Bogas)
3. Twist and Shout (Russell-Medley)
  - Performed by The Isley Brothers
4. Angie's Theme (Bogas)
5. Take Five (Desmond)
  - Performed by the Dave Brubeck quartet
6. Carole's Theme (Shanklin)
7. Heavy Traffic (Shanklin)
8. What You Sow (Bogas)
9. Maybellene (Berry)
  - Performed by Chuck Berry
10. Michael's Scarborough Fair (P.D., arr. Bogas)
11. Ballroom Beauties (Bogas)
12. Ballroom Dancers (Shanklin)
13. Cartoon Time (Bogas)
14. Ten-Cent Philosophy (Bogas-Shanklin)
