= Breaking the Habit =

Breaking the Habit or breaking the habit may refer to:

- Drug rehabilitation techniques, such as:
  - Smoking cessation
  - going cold turkey
- Breaking the Habit (film), a 1964 animated short film by John Korty, nominated at 37th Academy Awards
- "Breaking the Habit" (song), single by Linkin Park
