= Who Are the DeBolts? And Where Did They Get Nineteen Kids? =

- DVD cover
- Directed by: John Korty
- Written by: Janet Peoples
- Produced by: John Korty
- Narrated by: Henry Winkler
- Cinematography: Jon Else
- Edited by: David Webb Peoples
- Music by: Ed Bogas
- Distributed by: Sanrio
- Release date: December 5, 1977
- Running time: 72 minutes
- Country: United States
- Language: English

Who Are the DeBolts? And Where Did They Get Nineteen Kids?
- Directed by: John Korty
- Written by: Janet Peoples
- Produced by: Henry Winkler
- Narrated by: Henry Winkler
- Cinematography: Jon Else
- Edited by: David Webb Peoples
- Music by: Ed Bogas
- Distributed by: Sanrio
- Release date: December 17, 1978
- Running time: 50 minutes
- Country: United States
- Language: English

Who Are the DeBolts? And Where Did They Get Nineteen Kids? is a documentary film by John Korty. A 72-minute version was released in 1977, and a 50-minute version was released in 1978.

== Summary ==
Dorothy and Bob DeBolt, an American couple who adopted 14 children (12 at the start of filming), some of whom are severely disabled war orphans (in addition to raising Dorothy's five biological children and Bob's biological daughter). VHS and DVD releases use the shortened title Who Are the DeBolts?

== Story ==
The film begins with Mr. and Mrs. DeBolt traveling from their home in California to New York, where they will adopt their 19th child, a blind and physically disabled teen named "J.R." The adoption process for J.R., his integration into the family, and his struggle to develop sufficient physical strength to climb the staircase inside the family home are used as a unifying device for telling the story of how the DeBolts became involved in the adoption of "special needs" children and showing how the family approaches the challenges of raising their unusual family.

During her first marriage, Dorothy had five biological children with Ted Atwood and adopted two children from Korea. After her husband's death, she adopted two boys from Vietnam (she relates in the film that many are surprised to learn that she did not ascertain before the adoption whether the children were from North Vietnam or South Vietnam). Following Atwood's marriage to Bob DeBolt, who had one biological daughter from a previous marriage, the couple went on to adopt 10 more children from Korea, Vietnam, the United States, and Mexico — the last was adopted after the initial film was made and is not included in the "19 kids" of the title.

The film introduces the adopted children, shows many details of how they accomplish everyday tasks and household chores, portrays special family events, and includes interviews with some of the older children and with Bob's biological daughter. The DeBolts' web site notes that five members of the production crew lived with the family for 2 1/2 years while filming the movie.

== Accolades ==
The film won an Academy Award for Best Feature-length Documentary in 1978, as well as the Directors Guild of America Award and the Humanitas Award for producer and director John Korty in 1979.

A 50-minute version of the film, narrated and executive produced by Henry Winkler, was shown on ABC on December 17, 1978. It earned a 1979 Emmy Award for Outstanding Individual Achievement - Informational Program for John Korty. It was also nominated for Outstanding Informational Program for John Korty Warren Lockhart, Dann McCann, and Henry Winkler.

== Follow-up ==
A sequel, Steppin' Out: The DeBolts Grow Up, was made in 1980 with Kris Kristofferson as host and narrator. The DVD edition typically includes the 46-minute sequel as a featurette. The family was also the subject of a book, 19 Steps Up the Mountain: The Story of the DeBolt Family by Joseph P. Blank.

== Preservation ==
The Academy Film Archive preserved Who Are the DeBolts? in 2007.
