= Beverly Hope Atkinson =

American actress (1935–2001)

- Atkinson in the 1970s
- Born: December 9, 1935; New York City, New York, U.S.
- Died: December 11, 2001 (aged 66); Los Angeles, California, U.S.
- Occupation: Actress
- Years active: 1968–1991

Beverly Hope Atkinson (December 9, 1935 – December 11, 2001) was an American stage, film, and television actress from 1968 until 1991, known for her work playing women down-on-their-luck or caught up in drug addiction.

== Career ==
Atkinson studied under Lee Strasberg in the 1960s and later became a member of the Actors Studio. After attending City College of New York, she began her career on the New York stage with the Café LaMama Theater troupe and Theater West in Los Angeles, touring in such productions as The Skin of Our Teeth, Lysistrata and The Blacks.

Atkinson relocated to Hollywood in the early 1970s. She impressed in her very first film role as a streetwise hooker in The New Centurions (1972) with George C. Scott. She had a role in the 1973 animated drama film Heavy Traffic as a black bartender named Carole who enters into a relationship with the struggling white cartoonist son of a Mafioso. The film features live-action segments in which Atkinson also played her live-action counterpart, in addition to voicing the animated character. She began her television career with minor roles, but found steadier work as her character career continued in the same flashy vein, playing angry women down-on-their-luck or whose lives were caught in drugs and addiction, most notably in a recurring role on Hill Street Blues from 1984 to 1986. She made a memorable appearance on Good Times as "Sweet Daddy" Williams' girlfriend Savannah Morgan.

Atkinson died of cancer in Los Angeles, California, two days after her 66th birthday.

== Filmography ==
Television

- Dark Shadows (1 episode, 1968)
- Sanford and Son (2 episodes, 1972–1974)
- Apple's Way (1 episode, 1974)
- Hustling (1975)
- Insight (1 episode, 1975)
- Bronk (1 episode, 1975)
- Police Story (1 episode, 1975)
- Law and Order (1976)
- Executive Suite (1 episode, 1976)
- ABC Afterschool Specials (1 episode, 1977)
- Baretta (1 episode, 1978)
- Outside Chance (1978)
- Good Times (1 episode, 1978)
- Skag (1 episode, 1980)
- The White Shadow (1 episode, 1980)
- Trapper John, M.D. (1 episode, 1981)
- Maid in America (1982)
- George Burns Comedy Week (1 episode, 1985)
- Hill Street Blues (6 episodes, 1984–1986)
- thirtysomething (1 episode, 1990)
- Never Forget (1991)

Film

- The New Centurions (1972)
- Heavy Traffic (1973)
- Cornbread, Earl and Me (1975)
- UFOria (1985)
- Behind God's Back (1989)
