= Ed Bogas =

American musician and composer (born 1942)

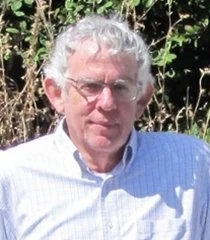
- Photo of Ed Bogas

Background information
- Also known as: Edward Bogas
- Born: Edgar Noel Bogas; February 2, 1942 (age 84); San Francisco, California, US
- Genres: Film score; video game music
- Occupations: Musician, composer
- Instruments: Keyboards, Violin
- Years active: 1968–present
- Website: www.ebogas.com

Edgar Noel "Ed" Bogas (born February 2, 1942), sometimes credited as Edward Bogas, is an American musician and composer whose work has been featured in films, animations, and video games.

== Career ==
Bogas' contributions span four decades and several genres. In the 1960s, Bogas was a member of the experimental rock band The United States of America, and in the 1970s, he contributed the music for films by Ralph Bakshi and for television specials for the Peanuts series, succeeding Vince Guaraldi after his death in 1976. In the 1980s, he started composing music for Commodore 64 computer games such as Hardball!. He also wrote music for Children's Television Workshop (Sesame Street) games for Atari such as Oscar's Trash Race and Big Bird's Egg Catch.

In 1977, Bogas voiced and composed many shows for Chuck E. Cheese's Pizza Time Theatre. He also voiced Crusty the Cat.

In 1980, Bogas composed the score for the CBS television movie A Christmas Without Snow, in which he also appeared in the part of the accompanist to the choirmaster portrayed by John Houseman.

He continued writing music for Peanuts television specials through 1989 (This Is America, Charlie Brown), and in 1982 he also began contributing music for Garfield TV specials and series. He composed the music for all 121 half-hours of Garfield and Friends, and co-wrote all the songs for the Garfield segments with future wife Desirée Goyette for the first three seasons, and with writer Mark Evanier for the rest of the run. Also on Garfield and Friends, Bogas provided the voices of the villainous singing ants in three episodes. Goyette and Bogas have two children (Benjamin and Lily).

Bogas writes music for broadcast commercials, television, and film with his San Francisco company, Bogas Productions.

== Discography ==
=== Film ===
- Eddie Macon's Run: Composer/Arranger (additional music)
- The Brave Little Toaster: Composer/Arranger (additional music)
- Bon Voyage, Charlie Brown (and Don't Come Back!!): Composer
- Love and the Midnight Auto Supply: Composer
- Race for Your Life, Charlie Brown: Composer
- He Is My Brother: Composer
- Slashed Dreams: Composer
- Memory of Us: Composer
- Silence: Composer
- Heavy Traffic: Composer w/Ray Shanklin
- Fritz the Cat: Composer w/Ray Shanklin, Musical director
- Payday: Composer, music supervisor
- Black Girl: Composer w/Ray Shanklin

=== Television ===
- A Lot in Common: Composer
- On a Collision Corse with Earth: Composer
- Garfield & Friends "The Picnic Panic": Composer, Voice (The Ants)
- Garfield & Friends "Another Ant Episode": Composer, Voice (The Ants)
- Garfield's Thanksgiving: Composer
- This Is America, Charlie Brown: Composer
- Garfield's Babes and Bullets: Composer
- Garfield: His 9 Lives: Composer
- Garfield and Friends: Composer
- A Garfield Christmas Special: Composer
- Garfield in Paradise: Composer
- Happy New Year, Charlie Brown!: Composer
- Garfield In Disguise: Composer, Lyricist
- The Romance of Betty Boop: Composer, Lyricist
- Garfield in the Rough: Composer, Lyricist
- It's Flashbeagle, Charlie Brown: Composer, Lyricist
- Garfield on the Town: Composer
- The Charlie Brown and Snoopy Show: Composer
- Here Comes Garfield: Composer
- No Man's Valley: Arranger, Conductor
- Hot Dog: Composer
- A Charlie Brown Celebration: Composer
- Someday You'll Find Her, Charlie Brown: Composer
- It's Magic, Charlie Brown: Composer
- A Christmas Without Snow: Composer
- Life Is a Circus, Charlie Brown: Composer
- She's a Good Skate, Charlie Brown: Composer
- It's an Adventure, Charlie Brown: Composer, Arranger, Conductor
- You're the Greatest, Charlie Brown: Composer
- What a Nightmare, Charlie Brown: Composer
- It's Your First Kiss, Charlie Brown: Composer
- Snoopy: The Musical: Conductor
- You're a Good Man, Charlie Brown: Conductor
- Animated Classic Showcase: Composer
- The Big Stuffed Dog: Composer

=== Albums ===
- The United States of America
- David Wiffen (producer, musician, arrangements)
- Heard You Missed Me, Well I'm Back (string arrangements)
- Shebaba (musician)
- Get My Own (string arrangements)
- Fine and Mellow (string arrangements)
- Play Me c/w Lady Sings the Blues (string arrangements)
- Where I'm Coming From (arranger)
- The Brothers Four (musician, arrangements)
- Fritz the Cat (soundtrack) (producer, musician, arrangements w/Ray Shanklin)
- Heavy Traffic (soundtrack) (musician, arrangements w/Ray Shanklin)
- Black Girl (soundtrack) (producer, musician, arrangements w/Ray Shanklin)
- Small Talk (string arrangements)
- Clover (producer, musician)
- Forty Niner (producer, musician)
- One Flew Over the Cuckoo's Nest (soundtrack) (producer, arranger w/ Jack Nitzsche)
- Very Best of Tom Fogerty (musician)
- Ace (musician, arrangements)
- Living Proof (musician)
- Got My Own (arranger)
- Deeper Blues (as King Bishop and the Squares)

=== Other ===
- Menlo the Frog
- Road Riot 4WD
- Psi-5 Trading Company
- Law of the West
- Action 52 (uncredited)
- Hardball!
- Studio Session (software)
- Falcon F-16 (theme music composer)
- Jam Session
- Murder on the Mississippi
- Super Tetris (with Paul Mogg)
- The Music Studio (Amiga music software and Apple IIGS music software) (Composer of software's demo songs)
- Capcom's MVP Football: Composer
- Fox's Peter Pan and the Pirates
- Wordtris (Game Boy, DOS, and Macintosh versions only.)
