= Peter Pan and the Pirates (video game) =

1991 video game

- Box art for Peter Pan and the Pirates
- Developer(s): Equilibrium
- Publisher(s): Toy Headquarters
- Composer(s): Ed Bogas (composer); Jeff Lefferts (sound programming)
- Series: Peter Pan
- Engine: Proprietary
- Platform(s): Nintendo Entertainment System
- Release: NA: January 1991
- Genre(s): Side-scrolling
- Mode(s): Single-player

Peter Pan and the Pirates is a video game for the Nintendo Entertainment System developed by American studio Equilibrium and published by THQ in 1991. It was based on the television animated series of the same name. The game is also known as Fox's Peter Pan & The Pirates: The Revenge of Captain Hook and was the first game that THQ released.

== Plot ==
Captain Hook has challenged Peter Pan to a duel, which will determine the fate of the enchanted world. In this game, Pan goes through several levels, each based on the television series of the same name, battling pirates and avoiding various traps until he reaches the pirate ship to battle with the evil Captain Hook.

== Gameplay ==
Each level has a certain number of pirates and other enemies that must be defeated before Pan can advance to the next level. Sometimes Wendy or other members of the Lost Boys will appear to offer helpful bits of advice. Beyond that, Pan can collect fairy dust to fly, as well as treasure chests and Tinker Bell to restore lost health.

Sometimes red balls can be obtained to throw at enemies, but for the most part the primary weapon in the game is a short sword with a limited attack range. The game has no continues or passwords, but extra lives can be earned during bonus levels. Many of the levels are actually repeats with slightly different colors being used, and at the end of each level Captain Hook can be seen running back and forth, except in the final level where the player must make Hook walk the plank.
