= Heavy Traffic (magazine) =

Literary magazine based in New York City

- Heavy Traffic Issue 4
- Editor: Patrick McGraw
- Categories: Literary
- Frequency: Biannually
- First issue: 2020
- Country: United States
- Based in: New York City, New York, United States
- Language: English
- Website: https://heavytrafficmagazine.com/

Heavy Traffic is a literary magazine based in New York City. It was founded by editor Patrick McGraw in 2020.

== History ==
The magazine was founded by editor Patrick McGraw in 2020. He created the publication after becoming unsatisfied with his job writing for mainstream magazines, and being unable to find publications willing to publish his short stories. He began considering founding his own magazine in 2017. McGraw became fascinated with the name "Heavy Traffic" after the release of the 1973 Ralph Bakshi film of the same name, but did not directly name the magazine after the film.

McGraw has stated that one of the magazine's central themes is what he perceived as the loss of literacy and meaning in the digital age, especially with the introduction of generative AI.

McGraw originally funded the magazine's operating costs with his own money before he was able to find patrons to support it. It launched in the United Kingdom in November 2024.
