= Capcom's MVP Football =

1993 video game

- Cover art for Capcom's MVP Football
- Developer: Equilibrium
- Publisher: Capcom U.S.A.
- Composers: Ed Bogas; Gary Clayton
- Platform: Super NES
- Release: NA: October 1993
- Genre: Sports
- Modes: Single-player, multiplayer

Capcom's MVP Football is a sports game for the Super Nintendo Entertainment System which simulates the American football game of the NFL, released in North America.

== Summary ==
There are four different game modes:

- Custom mode allows exhibition-type games to be played and for all the components of the game to be customized. Players can either control the action on the field or just be a coach and call all the plays.
- A tournament mode permits players to take their team through the playoff bracket and into the Super Bowl.
- MVP mode requires players to change history as they change the outcome of historical NFL games.
- Demo mode allows the players to watch the AI play against itself.

Other features of the game include:

- An instant replay after the end of every important play and the end of each half provides a television-like angle to the gameplay on field.
- Game statistics show deficient stats in red numerals.
