= John Korty =

American film director (1936–2022)

- Born: John Van Cleave Korty; June 22, 1936; Lafayette, Indiana, U.S.
- Died: March 9, 2022 (aged 85); Point Reyes Station, California, U.S.
- Occupations: Director, producer, writer, animator
- Years active: c. 1957–2022
- Awards: Who Are the DeBolts? And Where Did They Get Nineteen Kids? (Academy Award); The Autobiography of Miss Jane Pittman (Emmy Award)
- Website: www.johnkorty.com

John Korty (June 22, 1936 – March 9, 2022), was an American film director and animator, best known for the television film The Autobiography of Miss Jane Pittman and the documentary Who Are the DeBolts? And Where Did They Get Nineteen Kids?, as well as the theatrical animated feature Twice Upon a Time. He has won an Academy Award for Best Documentary Feature (for Who Are the DeBolts?) and several other major awards. He is described by the film critic Leonard Maltin as "a principled filmmaker who has worked both outside and within the mainstream, attempting to find projects that support his humanistic beliefs".

== Early life and career ==
Born in Lafayette, Indiana, he began making amateur films while still in his teens. He took a liberal arts education at Antioch College in Ohio and obtained work as an animator for television commercials while still in school. He graduated in 1959.

In a 1963 article he wrote for the Bolex Reporter, he notes that he first took an interest in animation during his second year at Antioch. He developed a cut-out technique and also used various other imaging methods including scratching the film stock, painting, and using objects such as photographs, string, cloth and scissors. He would continue to develop these techniques in projects through his career, culminating in his 1983 animated feature Twice Upon a Time. Using a Bolex H-16 camera, his television commercial work amounted to more than 30 spots, which he made with four other students at Antioch.

His 1964 short Breaking the Habit was nominated for the Academy Award for Best Documentary Short Subject.

== Film ==
While most of his later work has been for television, he actually started in film before moving to the small screen. In 1964, he moved to Stinson Beach in Marin County, north of San Francisco. There he made three feature films in four years. They were successful, low-budget projects. His first was the little-seen drama The Crazy-Quilt (1966), with narration by Burgess Meredith. The others were Riverrun and Funnyman, featuring performances by the comedy troupe The Committee Theatre. His barn was his studio (Korty Films), and it would become an inspiration for George Lucas and Francis Ford Coppola who also established studios in the San Francisco Bay Area. Korty Films would become part of what was later called the "New Hollywood". Korty actually became a tenant at Coppola's Zoetrope Studios in San Francisco, though he later moved out when Coppola raised the rents. The company finally settled in Point Reyes Station, California.

Other feature films directed or produced by Korty included Oliver's Story (1978) and Twice Upon a Time, a George Lucas-produced animated fantasy originally released theatrically by Warner Bros. in August 1983 and later aired as an HBO feature in June 1984. The film lost money, and Korty would not return to animated productions for more than twenty years. He also served as a cinematographer for a few films including the Robert Redford feature The Candidate.

== Television ==
His most highly lauded work was in television. He was active in the medium from the early 1970s until the late 1990s. He became known in the field in 1972 as director of The People. The film starred Kim Darby and William Shatner, was produced by Francis Ford Coppola, and was based on the science-fiction novel The Pilgrimage by Zenna Henderson. In 1974, Korty won an Emmy Award for Outstanding Directing for a Drama Series and a Directors Guild of America award for his filmed adaptation of The Autobiography of Miss Jane Pittman. Four years later, the Directors Guild of America gave him an award for Outstanding Directorial Achievement in Documentary for his documentary feature Who Are the DeBolts? And Where Did They Get Nineteen Kids?. The film had previously won an Academy Award in the documentary category.

Other films included Go Ask Alice (1973); an adaptation of Farewell to Manzanar (1976); and A Christmas Without Snow (1980). He also made the Star Wars spin-off adventure Caravan of Courage: An Ewok Adventure (1984). In 1993 he adapted the Rudyard Kipling story "They" into the film They Watch.

=== Sesame Street shorts ===
In the mid-1970s and late-1980s, several Korty animated shorts were featured on the PBS children's programs The Electric Company and Sesame Street. These segments featured moral tales including at least one adaptation of Aesop's Fables. There was a recurring character known as Thelma Thumb, and all of the films (some as short as 18 seconds) used Korty's backlit cut-out technique which he called Lumage (Luminous Image). He tended to use a synthetic fabric called Pellon for the Sesame Street animations, which lent a consistent style to the work. Improv actors often ad-libbed the dialogue, and child performers were sometimes used. Among the children was the sister of David Fincher. David Fincher worked for Korty and would later gain recognition as a director himself. John Korty also produced animated shorts for the first season of Vegetable Soup with the assistance of Drew Takahashi and Gary Gutierrez.

== Internet ==
In 2006, inspired by the state of political debate in America at the time, Korty produced two short animated pieces which he posted to the World Wide Web. They feature two characters, Brock & Throck, in discussions about the political landscape. Korty was quoted in a news release, "This summer, I found some sketches from my very first experiments. One in particular was perfect for a dialogue between two characters - a single zigzag line that can function as the profile for either face. I had put it away, waiting for the right subject matter. The wait was fifty years."

== Fog City Mavericks ==
He was one of several San Francisco film veterans profiled in the 2007 documentary film Fog City Mavericks.

== Personal life ==
During his long life, Korty married three times. His marriages to Carol Tweedie, and designer Beulah Chang ended in divorce. He was remarried to Jane Silvia, for 32 years. She survived him. They had one son, Gabriel Korty. Korty had two sons from his second marriage to Chang: Jonathan and David Korty. He also had three grandchildren.

== Major awards ==
- Emmy for The Autobiography of Miss Jane Pittman (1974).
- Oscar (documentary) (1977) for Who Are the DeBolts? And Where Did They Get Nineteen Kids?
- DGA Award for Outstanding Directorial Achievement in Documentary (1978) for Who Are the DeBolts? And Where Did They Get Nineteen Kids?
- Emmy for Outstanding Individual Achievement - Informational Program (1979) for Who Are the DeBolts? And Where Did They Get Nineteen Kids?
- Humanitas Prize for Farewell to Manzanar and Who Are the DeBolts? And Where Did They Get Nineteen Kids? (Special Awards Category, 1979)

== Death ==
Korty died on March 9, 2022. According to his brother Doug, the cause of his death was vascular dementia.

== Filmography ==
=== Films ===
==== Narrative ====
Year	Name	Director	Writer	Cinematographer	Notes
1966	The Crazy-Quilt	Yes	Yes	Yes	Also producer and editor
1967	Funnyman	Yes	Yes	Yes	Also animator
1968	Riverrun	Yes	Yes	Yes	
1972	The Candidate	No	No	2nd Unit	
1974	Silense	Yes	No	No	
1976	Alex & the Gypsy	Yes	No	No	
1978	Oliver's Story	Yes	Yes	No	
1983	Twice Upon a Time	Yes	Yes	No	Also character designer

==== Documentaries ====
Year	Name	Director	Producer	Writer	Cinematographer	Notes
1961	The Language of Faces	Yes	No	Yes	No	Shorts
1964	Breaking the Habit	Yes	Yes	No	No	Shorts
1970	Imogen Cunningham, Photographer	Yes	No	No	Yes	Shorts
1977	Who Are the DeBolts? And Where Did They Get 19 Kids?	Yes	Yes	No	No	
1980	Can't It Be Anyone Else	No	Executive	No	No	
2009	Miracle in a Box: A Piano Reborn	Yes	Yes	No	Yes	
2011	John Allair Digs In	Yes	Yes	Yes	Yes	Short

=== Television series ===
Year(s)	Name	Credit(s)	Notes
1974–1993	Sesame Street	Director (13 episodes) Animator and character designer	7 episodes
1971–1977	The Electric Company	Animator	8 episodes
1975–1976	Vegetable Soup	Animator	
1985	George Burns Comedy Week	Director	Episode: "The Funniest Guy in the World"

=== Television films ===
Director
Year(s)	Name	Notes
1972	The People	
1973	Go Ask Alice	Also script consultant
1973	Class of '63	
1974	The Autobiography of Miss Jane Pittman	
1974	The Music School	Short; Also writer and cinematographer
1976	Farewell to Manzanar	Also writer and producer
1978	Forever	
1980	A Christmas Without Snow	Also writer and producer
1983	The Haunting Passion	
1984	Second Sight: A Love Story	
1984	Caravan of Courage: An Ewok Adventure	Also cinematographer
1986	A Deadly Business	
1986	Resting Place	
1987	Baby Girl Scott	
1987	Eye on the Sparrow	
1988	Winnie	
1989	Cast the First Stone	
1990	A Son's Promise	
1991	Line of Fire: The Morris Dees Story	
1991	Long Road Home	
1991	Keeping Secrets	
1992	Deadly Matrimony	
1993	They	
1994	Getting Out	
1995	Redwood Curtain	
1997	Ms. Scrooge	
1998	Oklahoma City: A Survivor's Story	
1999	A Gift of Love: The Daniel Huffman Story	

Executive producer only

Year	Name	Notes
1980	Stepping Out: The Debolts Grow Up	Documentary
