= A Christmas Without Snow =

1980 film directed by John Korty

- Genre: Drama; Music
- Screenplay by: John Korty; Richard W. Beban; Judith Anne Nielsen
- Story by: John Korty
- Directed by: John Korty
- Starring: Michael Learned; John Houseman
- Theme music composer: Ed Bogas
- Country of origin: United States
- Original language: English

Production
- Executive producer: Frank Konigsberg
- Producers: Whitney Green; John Korty
- Production location: San Francisco
- Cinematography: Mike Fash
- Editors: Peter Parasheles; Barbara Pokras
- Running time: 95 minutes
- Production companies: Korty Films; Frank Koenigsberg Productions

Original release
- Network: CBS
- Release: December 9, 1980

A Christmas Without Snow is a 1980 American made-for-television drama film directed by John Korty and starring Michael Learned and John Houseman. The film was broadcast on CBS on December 9, 1980.

== Plot ==
A divorcee, Zoe Jensen (Michael Learned), moves to San Francisco from Omaha in an effort to rebuild her life. She has reluctantly left her young son back home with his grandmother until she is more financially secure. She joins a local church choir which has just gained a new, demanding choirmaster, retired music conductor Ephraim Adams (John Houseman). Adams challenges the choir to dramatically improve, creating discomfort for some of the members, particularly when he sets the high goal of performing Handel's Messiah for a Christmas concert. Meanwhile, the choir overcome setbacks as they all deal with personal issues.

A teacher by profession, Zoe soon learns no positions are available and that she lacks training to perform more readily-available work. Living in an inexpensive apartment, she brushes up her typing skills in order to gain employment before her mother wearies of looking after her son, who is growing anxious from his separation from Zoe.

Zoe receives her grounding at church, where an assortment of inner-city residents range from a former opera singer to a student seeking to educate himself for a life in a profession. The opera singer falls by the wayside when ego gets in her way, while the student is falsely accused of vandalism to the church organ simply because of his race, yet is vindicated by those who know and believe in him. Together, they persevere in the church choir. Along the way, Zoe finds an office job and, with the help of a bargain hunter, prepares a pleasant home for her son and herself.

Unexpected talent abounds within the choir. The amateurs give their best as ones who perform for the love of the music. This love extends far beyond the choir loft and is exemplified when the choir members band together to make the needed repairs to the organ pipes.

At a pre-performance holiday dinner the choir sees a different side of Ephraim Adams as he presents gifts to the choir members and joins in the merriment. Weakness suddenly overtakes him and he collapses; at a local hospital it is determined he has had a stroke.

The choir performs Messiah at the Christmas concert, accompanied by the vintage organ, with Adams in attendance in a wheelchair. The choir has progressed far beyond an unlikely group of city dwellers. They have become a family.

== Cast ==
- Michael Learned as Zoe Jensen
- John Houseman as Ephraim Adams
- Ramon Bieri as Henry Quist
- James Cromwell as Reverend Lohman
- Valerie Curtin as Muriel
- David Knell as Terry
- Calvin Levels as Wendell
- Ruth Nelson as Inez
- Beah Richards as Wendell's Grandma
- William Swetland as Hartley
- Ed Bogas as Seth
- Daisietta Kim as Maisie Kim
- Joy Carlin as Cora Newman
- Anne Lawder as Evangeline Burns
- Barbara Tarbuck as Carol Thorpe
- Roberta Callahan as Alice Lohman
- John Patton as Mr. Jefferson
- Gail MacGowan as Alto soloist
- Will Connolly as Bass soloist
- Jane Frasier-Smith as Mrs. Dienhart
- H. Leonard Richardson as Mr. Hitchrick
- Matthew Hautau as Robbie
- Sterling Lim as Arthur Kim
- Jay Krohnengold as Mr. Goodman
- Barbara Squier as Ms. Meyers
- Lou Picetti as Mr. Loop
- Will Marchetti as Dan Garner
- William Browder as Bride's father
- Joe Bellan as Taxi driver
- Stephanie Smith as Waitress
- Carol McElheney as Office worker
- Steve Prescott Jones as Man in office
- Mark Anger as Doctor
- Dan Leegant as Sergeant
- Tony Dario as Detective West
- Yule Caise as Tough youth
- Kevin Harris as Tough youth
- Robert Rivers as Tough youth

== Soundtrack ==
- "Messiah" by George Frideric Handel
