= Fritz the Cat (film) =

1972 film by Ralph Bakshi

- Theatrical release poster
- Directed by: Ralph Bakshi
- Screenplay by: Ralph Bakshi
- Based on: Fritz the Cat by R. Crumb
- Produced by: Steve Krantz
- Starring: Skip Hinnant; Rosetta LeNoire; John McCurry; Phil Seuling
- Cinematography: Ted Bemiller; Gene Borghi
- Edited by: Renn Reynolds
- Music by: Ed Bogas; Ray Shanklin
- Production company: Steve Krantz Productions
- Distributed by: Cinemation Industries
- Release date: April 12, 1972
- Running time: 78 minutes
- Country: United States
- Languages: English; Yiddish
- Budget: $700,000
- Box office: $90 million

Fritz the Cat is a 1972 American Independent adult animated black comedy film written and directed by Ralph Bakshi in his directorial debut. Based on Robert Crumb's comic strip of the same name, the film focuses on its Skip Hinnant–portrayed titular character, a glib, womanizing and fraudulent cat in an anthropomorphic animal version of New York City during the mid-to-late 1960s. Fritz decides on a whim to drop out of college, interacts with inner city African American crows, unintentionally starts a race riot and becomes a leftist revolutionary. The film is a satire focusing on American college life of the era, race relations, and the free love movement, as well as serving as a criticism of the countercultural political revolution and dishonest political activists.

Fritz the Cat had a troubled production history, with Crumb disagreeing with the filmmakers over the film's artistic direction. Produced on a budget of $700,000, the film was intended by Bakshi to broaden the animation market. At that time, animation was primarily viewed as a children's medium. Bakshi envisioned animation as a medium that could tell more dramatic or satirical storylines with larger scopes, dealing with more mature and diverse themes that would resonate with adults.

Fritz the Cat's depiction of profanity, extreme violence, sex, nudity, anti-religious humor, smoking, drinking and drug use, particularly cannabis, provoked criticism from more conservative and nationalist members of the animation industry, who accused Bakshi of attempting to produce a pornographic animated film, as the concept of adult animation was not widely understood at the time. The Motion Picture Association of America gave the film an X rating (the predecessor of the NC-17 rating), making it the first American animated film to receive the rating, which was then predominantly associated with more arthouse films.

Fritz the Cat was highly successful. It grossed over $90 million worldwide, which makes it one of the most successful independent films of all time. It earned significant critical acclaim in the 1970s, for its satire, social commentary and animations, despite attracting some negative response accusing it of racial stereotyping and having an unfocused plot, and criticizing its depiction of graphic violence, profanity, sex and drug use in the context of an animated film. The film's use of satire and mature themes is seen as paving the way for future animated works for adults, including The Simpsons and South Park. A sequel, The Nine Lives of Fritz the Cat (1974), was produced without Crumb's or Bakshi's involvement.

== Plot ==
Set in 1960s Manhattan, a group of hippies gather at Washington Square Park to perform protest songs. Fritz, an anthropomorphic tabby cat, arrives with his friends in an attempt to impress three girls, who instead show interest in an anthropomorphic crow standing nearby. In their effort to connect, the girls make unintentionally condescending remarks about black people. After the crow rebukes the girls and leaves, Fritz then presents himself as a troubled intellectual and invites the girls to "seek the truth" with him.

The group arrives at a friend's apartment, where a party is taking place. Due to crowding in other rooms, Fritz drags the girls into the bathroom, where they engage in an orgy. Suddenly, two police officers—depicted as pigs—call on the apartment. As they climb the stairs, a partygoer discovers the scene in the bathroom, prompting others to join. Fritz, marginalized in the crowded bathtub, turns to marijuana for comfort. When the police enter, one begins attacking the attendees. Seizing an opportunity, a dazed Fritz grabs the officer's gun and accidentally shoots the toilet, breaking the water main and flooding the apartment. The chaos allows Fritz to flee, and he escapes into a synagogue. There, he blends into the congregation as they erupt in celebration over the U.S. decision to supply more weapons to Israel.

Fritz returns to his college dormitory, where his studious roommates ignore him. Disillusioned with academic life, he sets fire to his notes and textbooks, unintentionally igniting a blaze that consumes the entire building. Afterwards, Fritz meets Duke the Crow at the pool table of a Harlem bar. After narrowly avoiding a fight with a bartender, Duke invites Fritz out, and the pair steal a car. Fritz crashes the vehicle off a bridge, but is saved by Duke. They make their way to the apartment of Bertha, a drug dealer whose potent cannabis enhances Fritz's urge. While having sex, Fritz claims he has discovered his purpose to start an insurrection. He runs into the street and incites a riot, eventually leading to Duke being shot and killed by police. The situation escalates, with the police and New York Air National Guard called in to suppress the uprising. The violence culminates in an airstrike, with fighter jets carpet-bombing Harlem as Disney characters cheer from the sidelines.

Fritz takes refuge in an alley, where he's found by his older fox girlfriend. She insists on taking him to San Francisco. However, when their car runs out of gas in the desert, Fritz abandons her. He later encounters Blue, a drug-addicted rabbit biker, and his horse girlfriend, Harriet. The three travel to an underground bunker, where two revolutionaries—John, a hooded snake, and a female gecko known as the "lizard leader"—plan to bomb a power plant. When Harriet attempts to leave for a Chinese restaurant, Blue physically assaults her and restrains her with chains. Fritz intervenes, prompting the lizard leader to burn his face with a candle. Blue and the others then throw Harriet onto a bed and gang rape her. After the group plants dynamite at the power plant, Fritz experiences a change of heart and tries to disarm the explosives, but fails and gets caught in the resulting explosion.

Fritz is hospitalized in Los Angeles. Harriet, disguised as a nun, visits him alongside the three girls from the New York park. Believing Fritz to be nearly dying, they attempt to console him. However, Fritz revives and repeats the same speech he initially used to seduce them. The film ends with him having sex with the trio, while Harriet looks on in disbelief.

== Voice cast ==
- Skip Hinnant as Fritz the Cat
- Rosetta LeNoire as Bertha / Additional voices
- John McCurry as Duke the Crow / Bar Patron
- Phil Seuling as Ralph / Additional voices
- Judy Engles (uncredited) as Winston Schwartz / Lizard Leader
- Ralph Bakshi (uncredited) as Al / Narrator / Blue / John / Additional voices
- Mary Dean (uncredited) as Charlene / Dee Dee / Winston / Harriet

== Background ==
Robert Crumb first created Fritz the Cat in 1959 as a teenager, and made his official debut in 1965 in Help!, a humor magazine edited by Harvey Kurtzman. Crumb's strips used anthropomorphic animals—typically associated with children's comics—to explore adult themes such as sex, drugs, and countercultural disillusionment. In the late 1960s, after Crumb moved to San Francisco and immersed in the counterculture, he began publishing his work in underground publications, emerging as a leading figure in the underground comix movement. Fritz quickly became one of his most recognizable characters, including mainstream audiences outside of the underground scene.

Ralph Bakshi began his career at Terrytoons studio in New York City in the late 1950s. He then met and formed a partnership with producer Steve Krantz to form Bakshi Productions. By the late 1960s, Bakshi felt creatively stifled and wanted to pursue more personal, ambitious projects. He developed Heavy Traffic (1973), a tale of inner-city street life. However, Krantz told Bakshi that studio executives would be unwilling to fund the film because of its content and Bakshi's lack of film experience.

== Production ==
=== Development ===
While browsing the East Side Book Store on St. Mark's Place in New York City, Bakshi discovered a copy of R. Crumb's Fritz the Cat (1969). Impressed by Crumb's sharp satirical tone, Bakshi purchased the comic book and later proposed to Krantz that it could be adapted into a feature film. Convinced that Crumb's creative sensibility aligned with his own, Bakshi expressed interest in directing the adaptation. Krantz then organized a meeting with Crumb, during which Bakshi presented sample drawings imitating Crumb's style to demonstrate his ability to translate the material into animation. Crumb was sufficiently impressed by Bakshi's commitment that he provided one of his sketchbooks for reference material.

As development continued, a pitch package was assembled that included a painted cel composited over a photographic background to illustrate Bakshi's intended visual approach. Although Crumb initially responded positively, he ultimately declined to sign a formal agreement due to uncertainty about the project's direction. Fellow underground cartoonist Vaughn Bodē cautioned Bakshi against collaborating with Crumb, describing him as "slick"; Bakshi later agreed with Bodé's assessment. Krantz subsequently sent Bakshi to San Francisco, where he stayed with Crumb and his wife Dana in an attempt to secure Crumb's approval of the contract. After about a week, Crumb left the project discussions, leaving the adaptation's status uncertain. However, since Dana Crumb held power of attorney, she ultimately signed the agreement on his behalf. Crumb received $50,000 in payments distributed across production milestones, along with ten percent of Krantz's share of the film's profits. With the rights to Fritz the Cat, Bakshi and Krantz began searching for a distributor, though Krantz stated that "every major distributor turned it down", as studios were reluctant to distribute an independent animated film—especially one radically different from the family-friendly fare associated with Walt Disney Productions.

=== Funding and distribution ===
In spring 1970, Warner Bros. agreed to finance and distribute the project, providing Bakshi and Krantz with their first major studio backing. Early on its production, the Harlem sequence was the first to be completed. Krantz even considered releasing this material as a standalone 15-minute short if financing fell through, although Bakshi remained committed to completing a full feature. In November, Bakshi and Krantz presented a preview reel to Warner executives that included finished sequences, pencil tests, and storyboard footage. Bakshi later described the screening as provoking a visibly negative reaction from studio staff, recalling that several executives were uncomfortable with what they saw and that one even walked out of the room. He characterized the experience as a turning point in which the studio made clear its dissatisfaction with the film's direction.

Warner Bros. subsequently requested that the sexual content be reduced and insisted on the inclusion of recognizable actors. When Bakshi refused to make these changes, the studio withdrew their financial support, forcing Krantz to seek alternative funding sources. This led to an agreement with Jerry Gross of Cinemation Industries, a distributor known for exploitation films, who agreed to finance and release the project after reviewing its provocative material. Additional financing came from Saul Zaentz, who arranged for the soundtrack album to be released through his Fantasy Records label. In Australia, the film's distribution was handled by 20th Century-Fox.

=== Direction ===
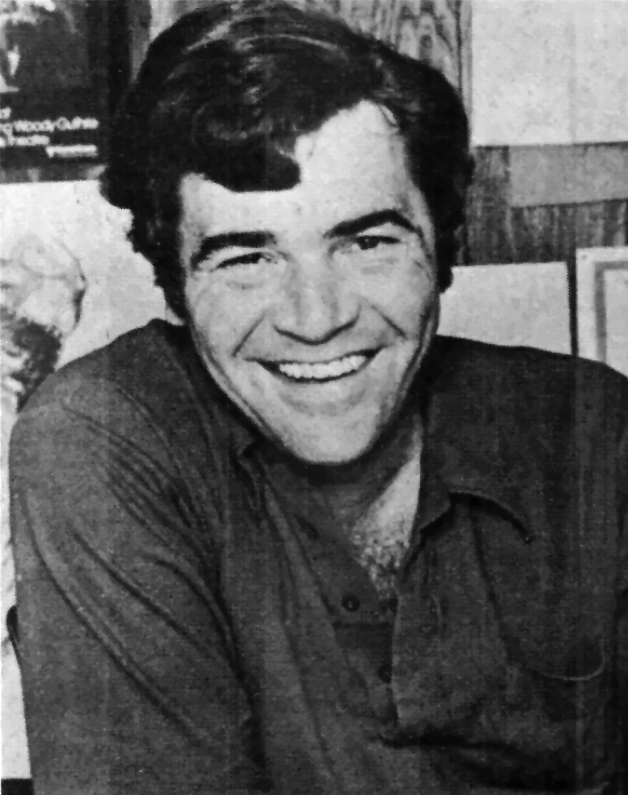
Fritz the Cat was the feature debut of writer and director Ralph Bakshi (pictured in 1979).

Bakshi was initially hesitant to direct Fritz the Cat, as he had already spent much of his career animating anthropomorphic animals and had hoped to move toward films focused primarily on human subjects. Nevertheless, he was attracted to the project because of his strong admiration for Crumb's work, which he regarded as a "total genius". As development progressed, Bakshi became increasingly enthusiastic about the creative freedom the material allowed, particularly in its use of anthropomorphic characters to explore social and political satire. He later described the process as an "awakening", in which he realized how far character design and identity could be pushed within animation. This included experimenting with characters such as a police officer portrayed as a pig and another pig character identified as Jewish, as well as Black people portrayed as crows, inspired by a Heckle and Jeckle scene Bakshi worked on for Terrytoons. In his notes to animator Cosmo Anzilotti, Bakshi's attention to detail extended to character habits, even specifying that the crows smoked marijuana rather than tobacco. Bakshi states that the characters smoking weed had to be an important character detail.

In the film's opening sequence, the setting is established both through the title and a voiceover narration by Bakshi, who presents a reflective account of the 1960s as a period marked by contrasts, described as "happy times, heavy times". The opening dialogue follows three construction workers during a lunch break and quickly introduces the film's recurring concerns, including drug use, sexual relationships, and the broader social and political tensions of the era. As the sequence continues, one worker urinates off a scaffold, with the opening credits displayed over the abstract image of liquid falling against a black background. When the credits conclude, it is revealed that the worker has urinated on a passing long-haired hippie carrying a guitar, reinforcing the film's irreverent and confrontational tone. Film historian Karl F. Cohen characterized Fritz the Cat as a depiction of the radical political climate of its time, noting that Bakshi's portrayal of Fritz's world combines humor, violence, sexuality, and social satire in a deliberately provocative style.

Bakshi described his directing approach to Fritz the Cat as being rooted in live-action filmmaking rather than traditional animation techniques. He emphasized that he avoided conventions such as musical numbers or stylized character behavior, instead aiming for performances that would feel grounded and believable, prioritizing a sense of realism in character movement and interaction with the argument that overtly theatrical elements would undermine that effect. He also framed the film as a stark contrast to the style and tone associated with Walt Disney Productions, incorporating satirical references to Disney imagery as part of that contrast. In one sequence, animated silhouettes resembling Mickey Mouse, Daisy Duck, and Donald Duck are shown celebrating alongside the U.S. Air Force during a bombing raid on a Black neighborhood, while another scene alludes to the "Pink Elephants on Parade" sequence from Dumbo (1941). The film also includes sequence where the camera pans across a garbage-strewn lot in Harlem, a stylistic technique Bakshi would later reuse in his film Hey Good Lookin' (1982).

=== Writing ===
The original screenplay of Fritz the Cat consisted largely of dialogue and remained close to Crumb's source material, but this was eventually abandoned as Bakshi shifted toward a more experimental narrative structure. Bakshi later explained that he preferred not to rigidly lock down a script early in production, arguing that his perception of a film often evolved significantly over time. He emphasized that characters developed organically throughout the filmmaking process, and that allowing for revision enabled him to strengthen performances and narrative direction as production progressed. He described this method as a "stream of consciousness" approach that functioned as an ongoing learning process rather than a fixed plan from the outset. Bakshi decided to avoid portraying characters with overtly feral or animalistic behavior, aiming instead to ground them in a more realistic and human-like performance style.

The film's narrative structure draws directly from multiple comics of Crumb's. The first portion is adapted from a 1968 issue of R. Crumb's Head Comix, while the middle section is based on "Fritz Bugs Out", which appeared in serialized form in Cavalier between February and October 1968. The concluding segment incorporates material from "Fritz the No-Good", also published by Cavalier in its September/October issue. The final portion of the film departs significantly from its source material, taking a notably darker and more violent direction than Crumb's original stories. Animation historian Michael Barrier has characterized this section as substantially grimmer than anything previously seen in the comics. Bakshi later explained that these changes were made because he felt the original strips lacked sufficient thematic depth for a feature-length adaptation. He argued that additional material and characterization, including rabbis, were necessary to expand the narrative into a more substantial film, though he also acknowledged that these alterations contributed to creative disagreements with Crumb, who objected to the inclusion of certain thematic elements not present in the original comics.

Bakshi's preference for avoiding overtly anthropomorphic behavior also led to changes in specific action sequences adapted from the comics. In one instance from "Fritz Bugs Out", a scene in which Duke rescues Fritz by flying while carrying him was reworked for the film: instead of flight, Duke pulls himself to safety by grabbing a railing before a car plunges into a river. Although Bakshi was not fully satisfied with the compromise, he considered it more consistent with the grounded realism he was aiming to maintain. The film also presents two separate characters named Winston: one appearing briefly at the beginning and end of the narrative, and Winston Schwartz, one of Fritz's girlfriends. Barrier observed that Winston Schwartz, who plays a significant role in the original "Fritz Bugs Out" and "Fritz the No-Good" stories, is not formally introduced in the film, and has suggested that the duplication of the name may reflect an attempt to reconcile elements from different source stories. However, the two characters differ substantially in both appearance and voice. Bakshi originally intended the film to conclude with Fritz's death, but producer Steve Krantz opposed this ending. As a result, Bakshi revised the conclusion, resulting in the final ending used in the released version of the film.

=== Animation ===
Fritz trying to pick up a trio of young women at Washington Square Park. The background is a watercolor painting based on a tracing from a photograph, giving the film a stylized realism virtually unprecedented in animation.

Many of the animators who worked on Fritz the Cat were professionals who Bakshi had previously worked with at Terrytoons, including Jim Tyer, John Gentilella, Nick Tafuri, Martin Taras, Larry Riley, and Cliff Augustine. According to Bakshi, it took quite a long time to assemble the right staff. Those who entered with a smirk, "wanting to be very dirty and draw filthy pictures", did not stay very long, neither did those with a low tolerance for vulgarity. One cartoonist refused to draw a black crow shooting a pig policeman. Two female animators quit; one because she could not bring herself to tell her children what she did for a living, the other because she refused to draw exposed breasts.

To reduce production costs and streamline the workflow, Bakshi assigned animator John Sparey to animate some of the first sequences featuring Fritz, trusting his ability to interpret the character design effectively and establish a strong visual foundation for the rest of the team. Key poses from Sparey's work were then photocopied and distributed to other animators as reference material for maintaining consistency across scenes. The production also proceeded with very limited use of pencil testing. Bakshi estimated that roughly a thousand feet of animation were pencil-tested in total, noting that the approach presented significant challenges, particularly in maintaining accurate timing. As a result, he often had to assess timing by manually flipping through drawings before the sequences were fully animated, only seeing the complete motion once it appeared on screen. In another example, Veteran Warner Bros. animator Ted Bonnicksen continued working on his sequences, most notably the synagogue scene, while suffering from leukemia. He reportedly took material home at night to complete his animation.

In May 1971, Bakshi relocated his studio to Los Angeles in order to recruit additional animators. The move brought a mixed response from industry professionals. Some animators, including Rod Scribner, Dick Lundy, Virgil Ross, Norman McCabe, and John Sparey, welcomed his arrival, viewing Fritz the Cat as a potential catalyst for greater stylistic and thematic diversity within the animation industry. However, other animators opposed Bakshi's presence in the city and placed an advertisement in The Hollywood Reporter to express their disapproval on what they perceived as the film's offensive content. Bakshi later stated that he was initially unfamiliar with many of the individuals involved and dismissed the advertisement upon seeing it. However, he also acknowledged that the broader negative reaction from some industry peers was personally discouraging during production.

=== Casting ===
The film's voice cast includes Skip Hinnant, Rosetta LeNoire, John McCurry, Judy Engles, Mary Dean, and comic book distributor/convention organizer Phil Seuling. Hinnant, recognized as a featured performer on The Electric Company, was cast as Fritz, because he "had such a naturally phony voice", according to Bakshi. McCurry was cast as Duke the Crow, LeNoire was cast as Bertha, and Engles was cast as Winston Schwartz. Bakshi and Seuling improvised their dialogue as the comically inept pig officers, the one voiced by Seuling being named "Ralph"; Bakshi enjoyed working as a voice actor and went on to provide voice roles for his later films. He recreated his pig officer voice for a storm trooper in his 1977 animated science fiction film, Wizards.

=== Audio design ===
Bakshi developed the film's audio design using extensive location recording and documentary-style sound collection, with the goal of making Fritz the Cat feel more immediate and real. He recorded large amounts of ambient material and on-the-street dialogue, later editing these recordings to fit specific scenes, even when they included imperfections such as background noise, tape hiss, or environmental interference. He resisted suggestions from sound engineers to re-record dialogue in a controlled studio setting, insisting that the raw quality of the recordings was essential to the film's realism.

The majority of the dialogue, excluding a few principal characters, was recorded on the streets of New York City. For the opening sequence, Bakshi recorded conversations with two construction workers he paid $50 each to speak on tape, capturing their conversation while socializing with them. In the Washington Square Park scenes, professional actor Skip Hinnant provided Fritz's voice, while Fritz's friends were voiced by young males Bakshi encountered directly in the park. For a sequence set in a synagogue, Bakshi incorporated a pre-existing documentary recording of his father and uncles chanting prayers, which he repurposed for the film's audio design. He later reflected that the inclusion of their voices carried personal significance for him, particularly after their deaths, and expressed appreciation for having preserved their voices in the film. Additional sound material was gathered at Harlem bars, where Bakshi used a tape recorder to capture extended conversations with patrons, often recording informal dialogue while socializing with them.

=== Cinematography ===
To reduce production costs and maintain visual consistency, Bakshi worked with background artist Ira Turek to construct the film's environments through traced photographic reference. Bakshi and Johnnie Vita photographed locations across New York City, including the Lower East Side, Washington Square Park, Chinatown, and Harlem, capturing atmospheric street images. Turek then transferred outlines from these photographs onto animation cels using a Rapidograph technical pen favored by Crumb, contributing to the film's distinctive combination of realism and stylization unprecedented in animation. The process continued through multiple stages: traced ink drawings were photocopied onto watercolor paper for painting, then matched with animation paper to align character movement with the backgrounds. After the watercolor work was completed, the original inked cel drawings were overlaid to refine and integrate the final composition.

Although much of the film's visual design was based on live-action reference, the tones of the watercolor backgrounds were influenced by "Ash Can style" of painters, which includes George Luks and John French Sloan. contributing to the film's gritty urban aesthetic. However, not every background was taken from live-action sources. The film also employed bent and fisheye camera perspectives to reflect different perspectives of the city, including from hippies and street criminals.

=== Music ===
The film's score was composed by Ed Bogas and Ray Shanklin. The soundtrack was released by Fantasy Records and primarily features soul-jazz instrumentals with contributions from drummer Bernard Purdie, organist Merl Saunders, guitarist Melvin Sparks, and bassist Chuck Rainey. The album additionally features Cal Tjader's composition "Mamblues", and licenses Bo Diddley's self-titled track, Billie Holiday's "Yesterdays", and a gospel-soul track from the Watson Sisters. Bakshi purchased the rights to use Holiday's performance of the song, "Yesterdays", for $35.

== Rating ==
Fritz the Cat was rated X by the Motion Picture Association of America, becoming the first American animated film to receive the rating. At the time, the rating was associated with more arthouse fare, and since the recently released Melvin Van Peebles film, Sweet Sweetback's Baadasssss Song, released through Cinemation, had received both an X rating and considerable success, the distributor hoped that Fritz the Cat would be even more profitable. Producer Krantz stated that the film lost playdates due to the rating, and thirty American newspapers rejected display advertisements for it or refused giving it editorial publicity. The film's limited screenings led Cinemation to exploit the film's content in the film's promotion, advertising it as containing "90 minutes of violence, excitement, and sex ... he's X-rated and animated!" According to Bakshi, "We almost didn't deliver the picture, because of the exploitation of it."

Cinemation's advertising style and the film's rating led many to believe that Fritz the Cat was a pornographic film. When it was introduced at a preview at the University of Southern California, Bakshi stated firmly, "Fritz the Cat is not pornographic." In May 1972, Variety reported that Krantz had appealed the X rating, saying "Animals having sex isn't pornography." The MPAA refused to hear the appeal. The misconceptions about the film's content were eventually cleared up when it received praise from Rolling Stone and The New York Times, and when it was accepted into the 1972 Cannes Film Festival. Bakshi later stated, "Now they do as much on The Simpsons as I got an X rating for Fritz the Cat."

Before the film's release, American distributors attempted to cash in on the publicity garnered from the rating by rushing out dubbed versions of two other adult animated films from Japan, both featuring an X rating in their advertising material: Senya ichiya monogatari and Kureopatora, re-titled A Thousand and One Nights and Cleopatra: Queen of Sex. However, neither film was submitted to the MPAA. The film Down and Dirty Duck was promoted with an X rating, but was likewise not submitted to the MPAA. The French-Belgian animated film Tarzoon: Shame of the Jungle was initially released with an X rating in a subtitled version, but a dubbed version released in 1979 received an R rating.

== Reception ==
=== Initial screenings ===
Fritz the Cat opened on April 12, 1972, in Hollywood and Washington, D.C. Despite its limited release, it went on to become a worldwide hit. Against its $700,000 budget, it grossed $25 million in the United States and over $90 million worldwide, and was at that point the most successful independent animated feature of all time. The film earned $4.7 million in theater rentals in North America.

In Michael Barrier's 1972 article on its production, Bakshi gives accounts of two screenings of the film. A preview screening in Los Angeles suggested a shift in how viewers perceived animated films, observing that many attendees responded to the work as they would to live-action cinema rather than traditional animation, which he interpreted as evidence that the film was helping to elevate the medium's perceived seriousness. Bakshi also attended a screening at the Museum of Modern Art, where audience members engaged him directly with politically charged questions about the film's themes and intent. He later described these exchanges as indicative of the film's provocative impact, noting that it prompted strong ideological reactions from viewers.

Overall, Bakshi characterized the film's reception as sharply divided. He explained that while younger audiences and viewers open to experimental work tended to respond positively, others associated with more traditional perspectives, including Disney and Norman Rockwell, reacted negatively, particularly to its explicit content and political tone. He suggested that the film was intentionally aimed at a more receptive, younger demographic, and acknowledged that this targeting contributed to the polarized responses it received.

=== Critical reception ===
Critical response to Fritz the Cat was mixed, but generally positive. Some critics praised the film's humor, boldness, and technical execution, while noting its deliberate effort to provoke and challenge audience expectations. Vincent Canby of The New York Times described the film as consistently funny while also emphasizing its broad capacity to offend viewers across different sensibilities. Film critic Judith Crist of the magazine New York offered a strongly favorable review, calling it sharply written, highly entertaining, and culturally pointed, and suggested that it represented a potential turning point for animated film as a medium.

Other responses were more ambivalent. Paul Sargent Clark of The Hollywood Reporter characterized the film as bold and forceful, while Newsweek described it as lightweight and designed primarily to attract attention through controversy rather than depth. The Wall Street Journal and Cue both published mixed reviews. Rolling Stone critic Thomas Albright initially praised the film in a published preview, comparing its significance to earlier animated works such as Yellow Submarine (1968). However, after viewing the completed film, he revised his opinion and described it in more critical terms, arguing that its visual inventiveness was undermined by a weak narrative structure and reliance on juvenile humor.

Lee Beaupre of The New York Times argued that the film simultaneously dismissed the ideals and personal struggles of the 1960s while also drawing heavily on the decade's sexual liberation, concluding that it ultimately "bites the hand that fed it" through its satirical stance. Film critic Andrew Osmond criticized the film's epilogue for undermining internal consistency, arguing that it introduced a level of cartoon-style survival that conflicted with the more grounded approach established earlier in the narrative. Patricia Erens was more critical of its content, describing certain depictions of Jewish characters as offensive and arguing that the film's broadly cynical perspective extends to all of its characters, including the protagonist.

=== Crumb's response ===
Crumb first viewed Fritz the Cat in February 1972 during a visit to Los Angeles alongside fellow underground cartoonists Spain Rodriguez, S. Clay Wilson, Robert Williams, and Rick Griffin. According to Bakshi, Crumb responded negatively to the adaptation, expressing dissatisfaction with key creative choices, including the casting of Skip Hinnant as the voice of Fritz and suggesting that Bakshi himself would have been a more appropriate choice for the role. In later interviews, Crumb expanded on his criticism, characterizing the film as a distorted reflection of Bakshi's own perspective rather than a faithful adaptation of his work. He described it as more psychologically "twisted" than his comics, arguing that its treatment of sexuality conveyed what he viewed as a repressed or forced tone rather than satirical insight. He also objected to what he perceived as the film's negative portrayal of radical political movements, criticizing Fritz's final dialogue that includes a reference to the Beatles song, "The End" (1969), as "red-neck and fascistic."

In "Fritz the Cat 'Superstar'," from The People's Comics, published in September 1972, Crumb kills off Fritz, where a neurotic ex-girlfriend stabs him in the back of the head with an ice pick due to Fritz' overt sexism.

Reports emerged that Crumb filed a lawsuit to have his name removed from the film's credits, although San Francisco copyright attorney Albert L. Morse later stated that no suit was filed and that any dispute was instead resolved through an agreement concerning credit attribution. Despite these claims, Crumb's name ultimately remained in the final version of the film as released theatrically. In response to his dissatisfaction with the adaptation, Crumb later revisited the character in his own work, publishing "Fritz the Cat—Superstar" in People's Comics later in 1972, in which the character is murdered with an icepick by a jealous girlfriend. He also declined to allow further use of Fritz in adaptations and formally instructed the filmmakers not to use his characters in future productions.

Crumb later described the experience as deeply unpleasant, stating that he preferred to distance himself from the film and rarely revisited it afterward. He recalled a screening at a German art school in the mid-1980s where he was required to watch it with students, which he characterized as an uncomfortable and embarrassing experience. He also referenced earlier warnings from artist Victor Moscoso, who advised him against allowing the adaptation, a warning Crumb later said he believed had been accurate in hindsight. In a 2008 interview, Bakshi revisited his working relationship with Crumb and described it in highly critical terms, characterizing Crumb as unpredictable in business dealings and difficult to work with. He discussed the financial arrangements tied to the film's profits and stated that Crumb ultimately received payments under the agreement, while also alleging disputes over compensation distribution. Bakshi further expressed a negative personal view of Crumb's character and artistic range, while acknowledging his influence as an artist. He also claimed that Crumb threatened to distance himself professionally from other cartoonists who collaborated with Bakshi, a move Bakshi suggested could have affected their publishing opportunities within the underground comics community.

== Legacy ==
In addition to other animated films aimed at adult audiences, the film's success led to the production of a sequel, The Nine Lives of Fritz the Cat (1974). Although producer Krantz and voice actor Hinnant returned for the follow-up, Bakshi did not. Instead, Nine Lives was directed by animator Robert Taylor, who co-wrote the film with Fred Halliday and Eric Monte. The sequel was distributed by American International Pictures, and was considered inferior to its predecessor. Bakshi stated that he felt constricted using anthropomorphic characters in Fritz the Cat, and focused solely on non-anthropomorphic characters in Heavy Traffic and Hey Good Lookin', though he later used anthropomorphic characters in Coonskin (1975)

Fritz the Cat is widely regarded by critics as a landmark in animation for introducing subject matter, including explicit sexuality and graphic violence, that had rarely been depicted in American animated films at the time. In the book Masters of Animation, John Grant described it as a breakthrough work that expanded possibilities in American animation, while also noting its unusually precise portrayal of a specific social milieu of the 1960s. The film's combination of satire and controversial content positioned it as a clear alternative to mainstream studio animation, which had traditionally avoided adult themes.

Film historian Michael Barrier later described Fritz the Cat and Bakshi's subsequent Heavy Traffic as ambitious works that sought to extend the boundaries of animation while still building on established cartoon traditions. Over time, Fritz the Cat has also been cited as an influence on the development of adult-oriented animation, helping to pave way for future animated works, including The Simpsons and South Park. As a result of these innovations, Fritz the Cat was selected by Time Out magazine as the 42nd greatest animated film, and was placed at number 56 on Channel 4's list of the 100 Greatest Cartoons. Footage from the film was edited into the music video for Guru's 2007 song "State of Clarity".

== Home media ==
Fritz the Cat, along with The Nine Lives of Fritz the Cat, was released on VHS in 1988, by Warner Home Video through Orion Pictures. In 2001, MGM distributed the film with the sequel on DVD in widescreen. The film again, along with its sequel, was released on Blu-ray by Scorpion Releasing and Kino Lorber on October 26, 2021, featuring a new audio commentary by comic artist Stephen R. Bissette and author G. Michael Dobbs.

== See also ==
- List of American films of 1972
- List of cult films
- Arthouse animation

== Works cited ==
- Barrier, Michael (1999). Hollywood Cartoons: American Animation in Its Golden Age. Oxford University Press. ISBN 0-19-516729-5.
- Beaupre, Lee (July 2, 1972). "Phooey on Fritz the Cat". The New York Times. ISSN 0362-4331. Archived from the original on February 28, 2020.
- Beck, Jerry (2005). The Animated Movie Guide. Chicago Review Press. ISBN 978-1-55652-591-9.
- Choron, Sandra; Choron, Harry; Moore, Arden (2007). Planet Cat: A Cat-Alog. Houghton Mifflin Harcourt. ISBN 978-0-61881-259-2.
- Cohen, Karl (1997). Forbidden Animation: Censored Cartoons and Blacklisted Animators in America. McFarland & Company. ISBN 0-7864-0395-0.
- Creekmur, Corey H. (2010). "Fritz the Cat". In Booker, M. Keith (ed.). Encyclopedia of Comic Books and Graphic Novels. ABC-CLIO. pp. 227–229. ISBN 978-0-313-35746-6.
- Crist, Judith (April 17, 1972). "A New Breed of Cat". New York Magazine. Vol. 5, no. 16. New York Media, LLC. p. 24. ISSN 0028-7369.
- Crumb, Robert (1987). The Complete Crumb Comics. Vol. 1: The Early Years of Bitter Struggle. Fantagraphics Books. ISBN 978-0-93019-343-0.
- Crumb, Robert (2004). R. Crumb: Conversations. University Press of Mississippi. ISBN 1-57806-637-9.
- Crumb, Robert; Poplaski, Peter (2005). The R. Crumb Handbook. M Q Publications. ISBN 978-1-84072-716-6.
- Duin, Steve; Richardson, Mike (1998). Comics, Between the Panels. Dark Horse Comics. ISBN 1-56971-344-8.
- Erens, Patricia (1984). The Jew in American Cinema. Indiana University Press. ISBN 0-253-14500-7. The Jew in American Cinema at Google Books.
- Estren, Mark J. (1974). A History of Underground Comics. Straight Arrow Books. ISBN 978-0879320751.
- Gibson, John M.; McDonnell, Chris (2008). Unfiltered: The Complete Ralph Bakshi. Universe. ISBN 978-0-7893-1684-4.
- Grant, John (2001). Masters of Animation. Watson–Guptill. ISBN 0-8230-3041-5.
- Harvey, R. C. (1996). The Art of the Comic Book: An Aesthetic History. University Press of Mississippi. ISBN 978-0-87805-758-0.
- Kanfer, Stefan (2001). Serious Business: The Art and Commerce of Animation in America from Betty Boop to Toy Story. Da Capo. ISBN 978-0-306-80918-7.
- Lenburg, Jeff (2006). Who's Who in Animated Cartoons: An International Guide to Film and Television's Award-Winning and Legendary Animators. Hal Leonard Corporation. ISBN 1-55783-671-X.
- Osmond, Andrew (2010). 100 Animated Feature Films. Palgrave Macmillan. ISBN 978-1-83902-442-9.
- Umphlett, Wiley L. (2006). From Television to the Internet: Postmodern Visions of American Media Culture in the Twentieth Century. Fairleigh Dickinson University Press. ISBN 978-0-8386-4080-7.
