= 31st Directors Guild of America Awards =

- Date: March 10, 1979
- Location: The Beverly Hilton, Los Angeles, California
- Country: United States
- Presented by: Directors Guild of America

Highlights
- Best Director Feature Film: The Deer Hunter – Michael Cimino
- Website: https://www.dga.org/Awards/History/1970s/1978.aspx?value=1978

The 31st Directors Guild of America Awards, honoring the outstanding directorial achievements in film and television in 1978, were presented on March 10, 1979 at the Beverly Hilton. The feature film nominees were announced in February 1979.

== Winners and nominees ==
=== Film ===
Feature Film

Michael Cimino – The Deer Hunter

- Hal Ashby – Coming Home
- Warren Beatty and Buck Henry – Heaven Can Wait
- Paul Mazursky – An Unmarried Woman
- Alan Parker – Midnight Express

=== Television ===
Drama Series

Gene Reynolds – Lou Grant for "Prisoner"

- Michael Apted – Laurence Olivier Presents for "The Collection"
- Joseph Hardy – The Paper Chase for "Pilot"
Comedy Series

Paul Bogart – All in the Family for "California, Here We Are"

- Charles S. Dubin – M*A*S*H for "Point of View"
- Jay Sandrich – Soap for "Episode 32"
Musical Variety

Merrill Brockway – Great Performances for "Choreography by Balanchine: Part 3"

- George Schaefer – The Second Barry Manilow Special
- Gary Weis – Steve Martin: A Wild and Crazy Guy
Documentary

John Korty – Who Are the DeBolts? And Where Did They Get Nineteen Kids?

- Arthur Fisher – Disneyland: 25th Anniversary Special
- Richard Gerdau – ABC News Close-Up for Arson: Fire for Hire
Actuality

Don Mischer – Kennedy Center Honors

- Edward Nathanson – NFL Football
- Marty Pasetta – AFI Life Achievement Award: A Tribute to Henry Fonda
Specials/Movies for TV/Actuality

Marvin J. Chomsky – Holocaust

- Glenn Jordan – Les Misérables
- George Schaefer – First, You Cry
