= Breaking the Habit (film) =

1964 film

- Directed by: John Korty
- Produced by: Henry Jacobs; John Korty
- Production company: American Cancer Society
- Distributed by: Modern Talking Picture Service
- Release date: 1964
- Running time: 5 minutes
- Country: United States
- Language: English

Breaking the Habit is a 1964 American animated short documentary film directed by John Korty about cigarette smoking and lung cancer. It was nominated for an Academy Award for Best Documentary Short.

== Content ==
Two men are discussing about the benefits of giving up smoking, while themselves puffing cigarettes.

== Production ==
Freelance animator Korty moved to Stinson Beach, California, where one day he met sound artist Henry Jacobs who had prepared the soundtrack for a future short film about smoking, sponsored by the California division of American Cancer Society. Korty began work on the film under his own company Korty Films, employing cutout animation, conceptualized the characters and prepared the animation frames in his home studio and finally shooting them using a homemade camera stand. Modern Talking Picture Service distributed the film.

== Reception ==
Described variously as "[d]one in semi-surrealistic style" and having "deadpan dialogue with a minimalist animation style", Breaking the Habit received a nomination at the 37th Academy Awards in the Best Documentary (Short Subject) category but lost to Nine from Little Rock. An article in The Kingston Daily Freeman stated that the film "reveals both the danger and the essential silliness of smoking".

The Washington State Office of Superintendent of Public Instruction included Breaking the Habit in its list of prescribed films to be shown in schools to discourage smoking and creating awareness regarding medical issues caused by it. It was also screened at the 1st Chicago Film Festival held in 1965, the following year's Melbourne International Film Festival and won a Silver Award at the San Francisco International Film Festival. The soundtrack of the film was included in the album The Wide Weird World of Henry Jacobs. As of August 2017, the Academy Film Archive was working on restoring the short film.
