= John Houseman =

British-American theatre and film producer, actor, and teacher (1902–1988)

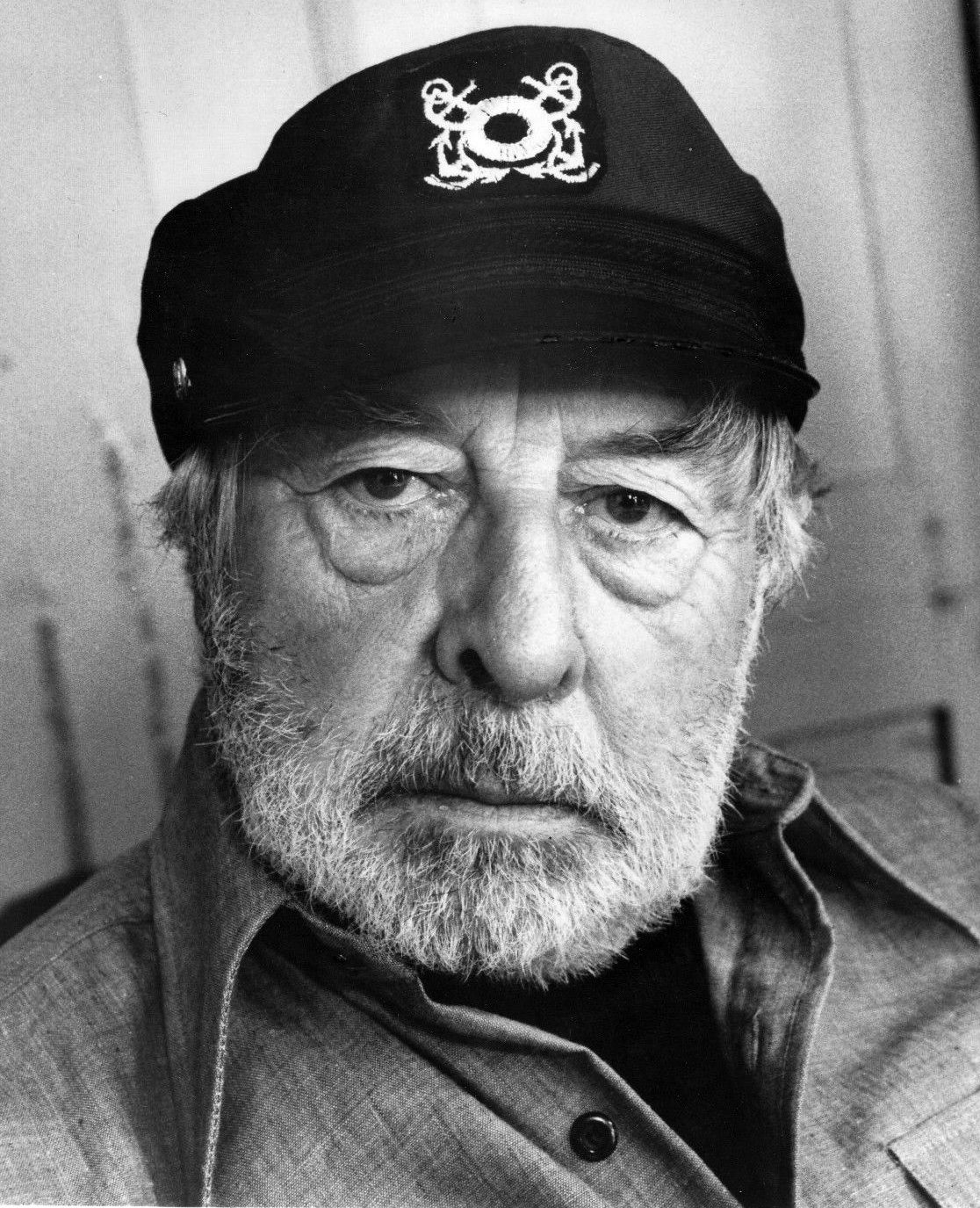
- Houseman in The Fog (1980)
- Born: Jacques Haussmann; September 22, 1902; Bucharest, Kingdom of Romania
- Died: October 31, 1988 (aged 86); Malibu, California, U.S.
- Citizenship: British subject; United States (after 1943)
- Occupations: Actor; producer; director; teacher
- Years active: 1930–1988
- Spouses: Zita Johann (m. 1929; div. 1933) Joan Courtney (m. 1952)
- Children: 2
- Relatives: Charles Siepmann (stepbrother)

John Houseman (born Jacques Haussmann; September 22, 1902 – October 31, 1988) was a British-American theatre and film producer, actor, director, and teacher. He became known for his highly publicized collaboration with director Orson Welles from their days in the Federal Theatre Project through to the production of Citizen Kane. He enjoyed a distinguished career as an influential producer of both the stage and screen, and was the founding director of the drama department of the Juilliard School and co-founder of The Acting Company.

Houseman was nominated for an Academy Award for Best Picture for producing Julius Caesar (1953). As an actor, Houseman won the Best Supporting Actor Oscar for his portrayal of Professor Charles W. Kingsfield in the 1973 film The Paper Chase, which he reprised in the 1978 television series adaptation.

He was also nominated for four acting Golden Globe Awards (winning once), and a Primetime Emmy Award for producing. In 1979, Houseman was inducted into the American Theater Hall of Fame.

== Early life ==
Houseman was born September 22, 1902, in Bucharest, Romania, the son of May (née Davies), a governess, and Georges Haussmann, who ran a grain business. His mother was British, from a Christian family of Welsh and Irish descent. His father was Jewish and from Alsace–Lorraine (in present-day France).

Houseman was educated at Clifton College in England, became a British subject, and worked in the grain trade in London. He moved to Argentina as a speculator in the international grain markets before immigrating to the United States in 1925. He had a successful business career and was on the Chicago Board of Trade.

Houseman had married actress Zita Johann weeks before the 1929 stock market crash, with international markets in chaos. Johann encouraged him to reinvent himself with a new career path in the theater. He changed his birth name, Jacques Haussmann, taking the stage name John Houseman and began by translating works in German and French into English for the New York stage. He became a United States citizen in 1943.

== Theatre producer ==
On Broadway, Houseman co-wrote Three and One (1933) and And Be My Love (1934). Composer Virgil Thomson recruited him to direct Four Saints in Three Acts (1934), Thomson's collaboration with Gertrude Stein. He later directed The Lady from the Sea (1934) and Valley Forge (1934).

=== Collaboration with Orson Welles ===
In 1934, Houseman was looking to cast Panic, a play he was producing based on a drama by Archibald MacLeish concerning a Wall Street financier whose world crumbles about him when consumed by the crash of 1929. Although the central figure is a man in his late fifties, Houseman became obsessed by the notion that a young man named Orson Welles he had seen in Katharine Cornell's production of Romeo and Juliet was the only person qualified to play the leading role. Welles consented and, after preliminary conversations, agreed to leave the play he was in after a single night to take the lead in Houseman's production. Panic opened at the Imperial Theatre on March 15, 1935. Among the cast was Houseman's ex-wife, Zita Johann, who had co-starred with Boris Karloff three years earlier in Universal's The Mummy.

Although the play opened to indifferent notices and ran for a mere three performances, it nevertheless led to the forging of a theatrical team, a fruitful but stormy partnership in which Houseman said Welles "was the teacher, I, the apprentice."

He supervised the direction of Walk Together Chillun in 1936.

Orson Welles would later describe throwing flaming Sterno cans at Houseman on The Dick Cavett Show with both humour and regret.

=== Federal Theatre Project ===
In 1936, the Federal Theatre Project of the Works Progress Administration put unemployed theatre performers and employees to work. The Negro Theatre Unit of the Federal Theatre Project was headed by Rose McClendon, a well-known black actress, and Houseman. He describes the experience in one of his memoirs:

Within a year of its formation, the Federal Theatre had more than fifteen thousand men and women on its payroll at an average wage of approximately twenty dollars a week. During the four years of its existence its productions played to more than thirty million people in more than two hundred theatres as well as portable stages, school auditoriums and public parks the country over.

=== Macbeth (1936) ===
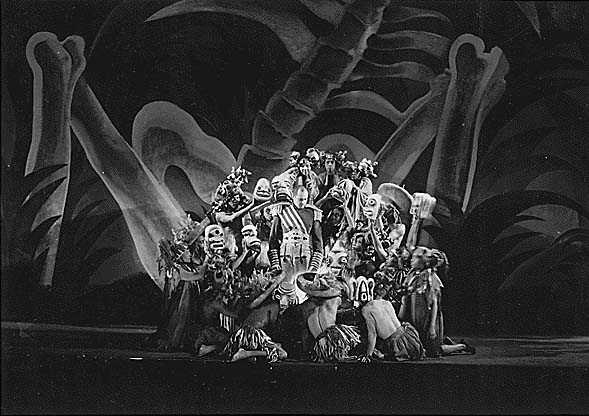
W.P.A. Federal Theater Project in New York: Negro Theatre Unit: "Macbeth", c. 1935.

Houseman immediately hired Welles and assigned him to direct Macbeth for the FTP's Negro Theater Unit, a production that became known as the "Voodoo Macbeth", as it was set in the Haitian court of King Henri Christophe (and with voodoo witch doctors for the three Weird Sisters) and starred Jack Carter in the title role. The incidental music was composed by Virgil Thomson. The play premiered at the Lafayette Theatre on April 14, 1936, to enthusiastic reviews and remained sold out for each of its nightly performances. The play was regarded by critics and patrons as an enormous, if controversial, success. After 10 months with the Negro Theater Project, however, Houseman felt he was faced with the dilemma of risking his future:

... on a partnership with a 20-year-old boy in whose talent I had unquestioning faith but with whom I must increasingly play the combined and tricky roles of producer, censor, adviser, impresario, father, older brother and bosom friend.

Houseman later produced for the Negro Theatre Unit Turpentine (1936) without Welles.

In 1936, Houseman and Welles were running a WPA unit in midtown Manhattan for classic productions called Project No. 891. Their first production was Christopher Marlowe's Tragical History of Dr. Faustus which Welles directed while also playing the title role.

Houseman and Welles put on Horse Eats Hat (1936). Houseman, without Welles, helped in the direction of Leslie Howard's production of Hamlet (1936).

=== The Cradle Will Rock (1937) ===
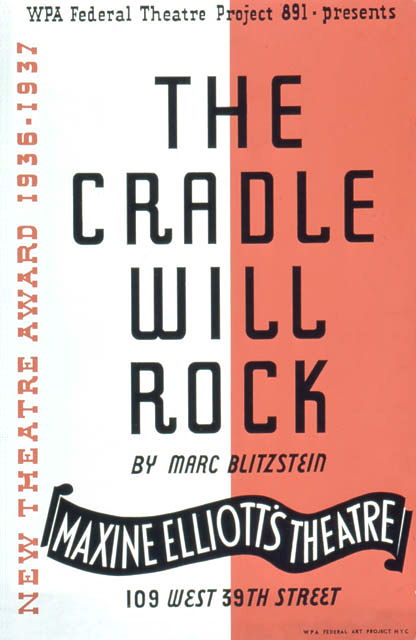
Original poster for Project #891's production of The Cradle Will Rock

In June 1937, Project No. 891 produced their most controversial work with The Cradle Will Rock. Written by Marc Blitzstein, the musical was about Larry Foreman, a worker in Steeltown (played in the original production by Howard da Silva), which is run by the boss, Mister Mister (played in the original production by Will Geer). The show was thought to have had left-wing and unionist sympathies (Foreman ends the show with a song about "unions" taking over the town and the country), and became legendary as an example of a "censored" show. Shortly before the show was to open, FTP officials in Washington announced that no productions would open until after July 1, 1937, the beginning of the new fiscal year.

In his memoir, Run-Through, Houseman wrote about the circumstances surrounding the opening night at the Maxine Elliott Theatre. All the performers had been enjoined not to perform on stage for the production when it opened on July 14, 1937. The cast and crew left their government-owned theatre and walked 20 blocks to another theatre, with the audience following. No one knew what to expect; when they got there Blitzstein himself was at the piano and started playing the introduction music. One of the amateur performers, Olive Stanton, who played the part of Moll, the prostitute, stood up in the audience, and began singing her part. All the other performers, in turn, stood up for their parts. Thus the "oratorio" version of the show was born. Apparently, Welles had designed some intricate scenery, which ended up never being used. The event was so successful that it was repeated several times on subsequent nights, with everyone trying to remember and reproduce what had happened spontaneously the first night. The incident, however, led to Houseman being fired and Welles's resignation from Project No. 891.

=== Mercury Theatre ===
That same year, 1937, after detaching themselves from the Federal Theatre Project, Houseman and Welles did The Cradle Will Rock as an independent production on Broadway. They also founded the acclaimed New York drama company, the Mercury Theatre. Houseman wrote of their collaboration at this time:

On the broad wings of the Federal eagle, we had risen to success and fame beyond ourselves as America's youngest, cleverest, most creative and audacious producers to whom none of the ordinary rules of the theater applied.

Armed with a manifesto written by Houseman declaring their intention to foster new talent, experiment with new types of plays, and appeal to the same audiences that frequented the Federal Theater the company was designed largely to offer plays of the past, preferably those that "...seem to have emotion or factual bearing on contemporary life." The company mounted several notable productions, the most remarkable being its first commercial production of Julius Caesar. Houseman called the decision to use modern dress "an essential element in Orson's conception of the play as a political melodrama with clear contemporary parallels."

Houseman and Welles later presented The Shoemaker's Holiday (1938), Heartbreak House (1938) and Danton's Death (1938).

=== Radio ===
Beginning in the summer of 1938, the Mercury Theatre was featured in a weekly dramatic radio program on the CBS network, initially promoted as First Person Singular before gaining the official title The Mercury Theatre on the Air. An adaptation of Treasure Island was scheduled for the program's first broadcast, for which Houseman worked feverishly on the script. However, a week before the show was to air, Welles decided that a program far more dramatic was required. To Houseman's horror, Treasure Island was abandoned in favor of Bram Stoker's Dracula, with Welles playing the infamous vampire. During an all night session at Perkins' Restaurant, Welles and Houseman hashed out a script.

The Mercury Theatre on the Air featured an impressive array of talents, including Agnes Moorehead, Bernard Herrmann, and George Coulouris.

==== "The War of the Worlds" (1938) ====
The Mercury Theatre on the Air subsequently became famous for its notorious 1938 radio adaptation of H. G. Wells' The War of the Worlds, which had put much of the country in a panic. By all accounts, Welles was shocked by the panic that ensued. According to Houseman, "he hadn't the faintest idea what the effect would be". CBS was inundated with calls; newspaper switchboards were jammed.

Without Welles, Houseman staged Douglas Moore's The Devil and Daniel Webster (1939).

== Film producer ==
=== Too Much Johnson (1938) ===
While Houseman was teaching at Vassar College, he produced Welles' never-completed second short film, Too Much Johnson (1938). The film was never publicly screened and no print of the film was thought to have survived. Footage was rediscovered in 2013.

=== Citizen Kane (1941) ===
The Welles-Houseman collaboration continued in Hollywood. In the spring of 1939, Welles began preliminary discussions with RKO's head of production, George Schaefer, with Welles and his Mercury players being given a two-picture deal, in which Welles would produce, direct, perform, and have full creative control of his projects.

For his motion picture debut, Welles first considered adapting Joseph Conrad's Heart of Darkness for the screen. A 200-page script was written. Some models were constructed, while the shooting of initial test footage had begun. However, little, if anything, had been done either to whittle down the budgetary difficulties or begin filming. When RKO threatened to eliminate the payment of salaries by December 31 if no progress had been made, Welles announced that he would pay his cast out of his own pocket. Houseman proclaimed that there wasn't enough money in their business account to pay anyone. During a corporate dinner for the Mercury crew, Welles exploded, calling his partner a "bloodsucker" and a "crook". As Houseman attempted to leave, Welles began hurling dish heaters at him, effectively ending both their partnership and friendship.

Houseman later, however, played a pivotal role in ushering Citizen Kane (1941), which starred Welles. Welles telephoned Houseman asking him to return to Hollywood to "babysit" screenwriter Herman J. Mankiewicz while he completed the script, and keep him away from alcohol. Still drawn to Welles, as was virtually everyone in his sphere, Houseman agreed. Although Welles took credit for the screenplay of Kane, Houseman stated that the credit belonged to Mankiewicz, an assertion that led to a final break with Welles. Houseman took some credit himself for the general shaping of the story line and for editing the script. In an interview with Penelope Huston for Sight & Sound magazine (Autumn, 1962) Houseman said that the writing of Citizen Kane was a delicate subject:

I think Welles has always sincerely felt that he, single-handed, wrote Citizen Kane and everything else that he has directed—except, possibly, the plays of Shakespeare. But the script of Kane was essentially Mankiewicz's. The conception and the structure were his, all the dramatic Hearstian mythology and the journalistic and political wisdom he had been carrying around with him for years and which he now poured into the only serious job he ever did in a lifetime of film writing. But Orson turned Kane into a film: the dynamics and the tensions are his and the brilliant cinematic effects—all those visual and aural inventions that add up to make Citizen Kane one of the world's great movies—those were pure Orson Welles.

In 1975, during an interview with Kate McCauley, Houseman stated that film critic Pauline Kael in her essay "Raising Kane", had caused an "idiotic controversy" over the issue: "The argument is Orson's own fault. He wanted to be given all the credit because he's a hog. Actually, it is his film. So it's a ridiculous argument."

=== Return to the theatre ===
After he and Welles went their separate ways, Houseman went on to direct The Devil and Daniel Webster (1939) and Liberty Jones (1941) and produced the Mercury Theatre's stage production of Native Son (1941) on Broadway, directed by Welles.

=== David O. Selznick ===
In Hollywood Houseman became a vice-president of David O. Selznick Productions. His most notable achievement during that time was helping adapt and produce the adaptation of Jane Eyre (1943) which starred Joan Fontaine and Welles.

=== World War II ===
In the aftermath of the attack on Pearl Harbor, Houseman quit his job and became the head of the overseas radio division of the Office of War Information (OWI), working for the Voice of America whilst also managing its operations in New York City.

=== Paramount ===
In 1945 Houseman signed a contract with Paramount Pictures to produce movies. His first credit for that studio was The Unseen (1945). He followed it with Miss Susie Slagle's (1945) and The Blue Dahlia (1946), both with Veronica Lake. The latter, starring Alan Ladd and written by Raymond Chandler, has become a classic.

He left Paramount and returned to Broadway to direct Lute Song (1946) with Mary Martin.

Back in Hollywood he produced Letter from an Unknown Woman (1948) for Max Ophuls at Universal.

=== RKO ===
Houseman went to RKO where he produced They Live by Night (1948), the directorial debut of Nicholas Ray. He also did The Company She Keeps (1949) and On Dangerous Ground (1951).

He returned to Broadway to produce Joy to the World (1949) and King Lear (1950–51), the latter with Louis Calhern.

=== MGM ===
RKO's head of production had been Dore Schary. When Schary moved to MGM he offered Houseman a contract at the studio, which the producer accepted.

Houseman's stint at MGM began with Holiday for Sinners (1952); then he had a huge success with The Bad and the Beautiful (1952), directed by Vincente Minnelli. He followed it with the film adaptation of Julius Caesar (1953) (for which he received an Academy Award nomination for Best Picture)

Also popular was Executive Suite (1954), a highly creative adaptation by Ernest Lehman of Cameron Hawley's bestselling novel. However, Her Twelve Men (1954), Minnelli's The Cobweb (1955) and Fritz Lang's Moonfleet (1955) all lost money. So did Lust for Life (1956), a biopic directed by Minnelli of Vincent van Gogh, although it was extremely well-received critically.

=== Television and theatre ===
Houseman moved into television producing, notably doing The Seven Lively Arts (1957) and episodes of Playhouse 90.

He also returned to theatre, producing revivals of Measure for Measure (1957) and The Duchess of Malfi (1957).

=== Return to MGM ===
Houseman was enticed back to MGM as a producer, and given his own production company, John Houseman Productions. His films were All Fall Down (1962), Two Weeks in Another Town (1962) and In the Cool of the Day (1963).

=== Return to television ===
Houseman returned to television where he made The Great Adventure and Journey to America (1964). He returned to Hollywood briefly to produce This Property Is Condemned (1966), then returned to TV for Evening Primrose (1966).

He returned to Broadway, directing Pantagleize (1967).

== Teaching ==
=== The Juilliard School and The Acting Company ===
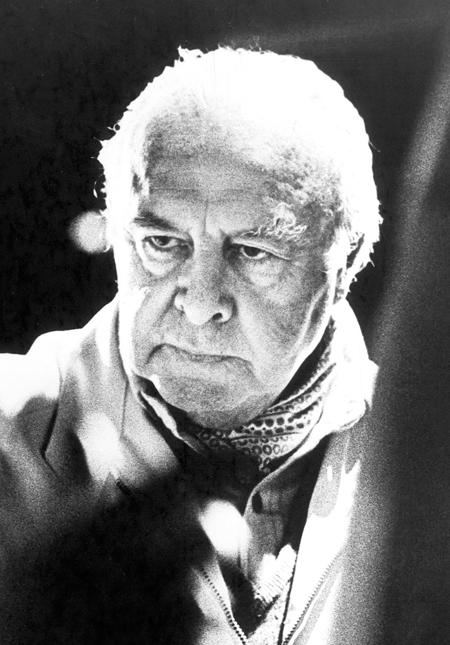
Houseman in 1973

Houseman became the founding director of the Drama Division at The Juilliard School, and held this position from 1968 until 1976. The first graduating class in 1972 included Kevin Kline and Patti LuPone; subsequent classes under Houseman's leadership included Christopher Reeve, Mandy Patinkin, Kevin Conroy and Robin Williams.

Unwilling to see that very first class disbanded upon graduation, Houseman and his Juilliard colleague Margot Harley formed them into an independent, touring repertory company they named the "Group 1 Acting Company." The organization was subsequently renamed The Acting Company, and has been active for more than 40 years. Houseman served as the producing artistic director through 1986, and Harley has been the company's producer since its founding. Writing in The New York Times in 1996, Mel Gussow called it "the major touring classical theater in the United States." John Houseman served as the Chair of the Division of Drama at the University of Southern California (USC) School of Dramatic Arts from 1977 to 1979.

=== Theatre ===
Houseman continued to be involved in theatre, producing The School for Wives (1971), The Three Sisters (1973), The Beggar's Opera (1973), Scapin (1973), Next Time I'll Sing to You (1974), The Robber Bridegroom (1975), Edward II (1975), and The Time of Your Life (1975)

He directed The Country Girl (1972), Don Juan in Hell (1973), Measure for Measure (1973), and Clarence Darrow (1974) (with Henry Fonda).

In 1979, Houseman earned induction into the American Theater Hall of Fame.

== Acting ==
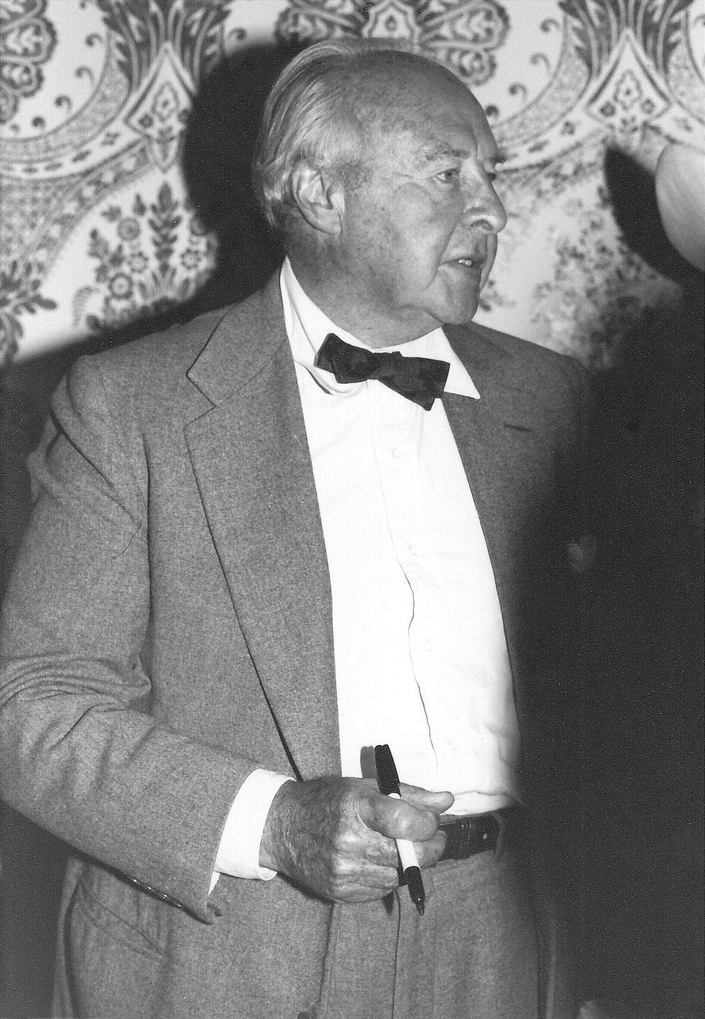
At the National Film Society convention in Los Angeles, 1979

Houseman had acted occasionally during the early part of his career and he had a brief but important part in Seven Days in May (1964).

He first became widely known to the public for his Golden Globe and Academy Award-winning role as Professor Charles W. Kingsfield in the film The Paper Chase (1973). The film was a success and launched Houseman into an unexpected late career as a character actor.

Houseman played Energy Corporation Executive Bartholomew in the film Rollerball (1975), and was in the thrillers Three Days of the Condor (1975) and St. Ives (1976).

He appeared on TV in Fear on Trial (1975), The Adams Chronicles (1976), Truman at Potsdam (1976), Hazard's People (1976) and Six Characters in Search of an Author (1976). Houseman was reunited with The Paper Chase co-star Lindsay Wagner in 1976's "Kill Oscar", a three-part joint episode of the popular science fiction series The Bionic Woman and The Six Million Dollar Man; he played the scientific genius Dr. Franklin.

He continued appearing on TV in Captains and the Kings (1976), The Displaced Person (1977), a version of Our Town (1977), Washington: Behind Closed Doors (1977), The Best of Families (1977), Aspen (1978), The Last Convertible (1978), The French Atlantic Affair (1978) and The Associates (1980).

In films he parodied Sydney Greenstreet in the Neil Simon film The Cheap Detective (1978) and was in Old Boyfriends (1979), John Carpenter's The Fog (1980), Wholly Moses! (1980) and My Bodyguard (1980).

Houseman briefly returned to producing with the TV movie Gideon's Trumpet (1980), in which he also appeared, and Choices of the Heart (1983). He produced one more show on Broadway, The Curse of an Aching Heart (1982).

He acted in The Babysitter (1980), A Christmas Without Snow (1980), Ghost Story (1981), Mork & Mindy, Murder by Phone (1982) (second billed), Marco Polo (1982), and American Playhouse (1982).

Later film appearances included Bright Lights, Big City (1988) and Another Woman (1988).

In 1988, he appeared in his last two roles—cameos in the films The Naked Gun: From the Files of Police Squad! and Scrooged. He played a driving instructor (whose mannerisms parodied many of his prior roles) in the former, and himself in the latter. Both films were released after his death.

=== Television ===
Having played a Harvard Law School professor in the film The Paper Chase (1973), he reprised the role in a television series of the same name, which ran from 1978 to 1979 and 1983 to 1986. During that time, he received two Golden Globe nominations for "Best Actor in a TV Series—Drama".

In the 1980s Houseman became more widely known for his role as grandfather Edward Stratton II in Silver Spoons, which starred Rick Schroder, and for his commercials for brokerage firm Smith Barney, which featured the catchphrase, "They make money the old fashioned way... they earn it." Another was Puritan brand cooking oil, with "less saturated fat than the leading oil", featuring the famous 'tomato test'.

He played Jewish author Aaron Jastrow (loosely based on the real life figure of Bernard Berenson) in the highly acclaimed 1983 miniseries The Winds of War (receiving a fourth Golden Globe nomination). He declined to reprise the role in the sequel War and Remembrance miniseries (the role then went to Sir John Gielgud).

However he was in the miniseries A.D. (1984), Noble House (1986), and Lincoln (1988).

== Writing ==
Between and sometimes during engagements, he contributed articles and book reviews to national publications, and wrote three volumes of memoirs, which are a chronicle of an era as well as a testimony to his phenomenal powers of recall: Run Through (1972), Front and Center (1979) and Final Dress (1983). In 1986 he published Entertainers and the Entertained. A fourth volume, Unfinished Business: Memoirs, 1902 to 1988, a distillation of his earlier books with some new material, was published in 1988.

== Personal life ==
Houseman was married to Zita Johann from 1929 to 1933. She was a stage actress when they married and he was a successful grain dealer until the 1929 stock market crash, at which point he became destitute and she encouraged him to pursue a new career in the theater.

Houseman was in a relationship with actress Joan Fontaine after her marriage to actor Brian Aherne ended in 1945.

In 1952, Houseman married Joan Courtney, a British actress born in 1916. They had two sons together. Under the name "Joan Houseman," she acted in TV and film in the 1950s and 1960s. The couple was married until his death in 1988.

== Death ==
On October 31, 1988, Houseman died at age 86 of spinal cancer at his home in Malibu, California.

== In popular culture ==
Houseman was portrayed by Cary Elwes in the Tim Robbins–directed film Cradle Will Rock (1999). Actor Eddie Marsan plays the role of Houseman in Richard Linklater's film Me & Orson Welles (2009). Houseman was played by actor Jonathan Rigby in the Doctor Who audio drama Invaders from Mars set around the War of the Worlds broadcast. Actor Sam Troughton portrayed Houseman in the 2020 film Mank.

== Filmography ==
=== Film ===
==== As actor (film) ====
Year	Title	Role	Director	Notes
1938	Too Much Johnson	Duelist/Keystone Cop	Orson Welles	Also producer
1964	Seven Days in May	Vice-Adm. Farley C. Barnswell	John Frankenheimer	Uncredited
1973	The Paper Chase	Charles W. Kingsfield Jr.	James Bridges	Academy Award for Best Supporting Actor; Golden Globe Award for Best Supporting Actor - Motion Picture; National Board of Review Award for Best Supporting Actor; Nominated – New York Film Critics Circle Award for Best Supporting Actor (2nd Place)
1975	Rollerball	Mr. Bartholomew	Norman Jewison	
1975	Three Days of the Condor	Wabash	Sydney Pollack	
1976	St. Ives	Abner Procane	J. Lee Thompson	
1978	The Cheap Detective	Jasper Blubber	Robert Moore	
1979	Old Boyfriends	Dr. Hoffman	Joan Tewkesbury	
1980	The Fog	Mr. Machen	John Carpenter	
1980	Wholly Moses!	The Archangel	Gary Weis	
1980	My Bodyguard	Mr. Dobbs	Tony Bill	
1981	Ghost Story	Sears James	John Irvin	
1982	Murder by Phone	Stanley Markowitz	Michael Anderson	
1983	A Rose for Emily	Narrator (voice)	Lyndon Chubbuck	Short film
1988	Bright Lights, Big City	Mr. Vogel	James Bridges	
1988	Another Woman	Mr. Post	Woody Allen	
1988	Scrooged	Himself	Richard Donner	Cameo; posthumous release
1988	The Naked Gun: From the Files of Police Squad!	Driving Instructor	David Zucker	Uncredited cameo; posthumous release

==== As producer (film) ====
Year	Title	Director	Notes
1938	Too Much Johnson	Orson Welles	
1945	The Unseen	Lewis Allen	As associate producer
1946	Miss Susie Slagle's	John Berry	As associate producer
1946	The Blue Dahlia	George Marshall	
1948	Letter from an Unknown Woman	Max Ophüls	
1948	They Live by Night	Nicholas Ray	
1951	The Company She Keeps	John Cromwell	
1951	On Dangerous Ground	Nicholas Ray	
1952	Holiday for Sinners	Gerald Mayer	
1952	The Bad and the Beautiful	Vincente Minnelli	
1953	Julius Caesar	Joseph L. Mankiewicz	Nominated – Academy Award for Best Picture
1954	Executive Suite	Robert Wise	
1954	Her Twelve Men	Robert Z. Leonard	
1955	The Cobweb	Vincente Minnelli	
1955	Moonfleet	Fritz Lang	
1956	Lust for Life	Vincente Minnelli	
1962	All Fall Down	John Frankenheimer	
1962	Two Weeks in Another Town	Vincente Minnelli	
1963	In the Cool of the Day	Robert Stevens	
1966	This Property Is Condemned	Sydney Pollack	

=== Television ===
==== As actor (television) ====
Year	Title	Role	Notes
1975	Great Performances	Dr. Fawcett	Episode: "Beyond the Horizon"
1975	Fear on Trial	Mike Collins	Television film
1976	The Adams Chronicles	Judge Richard Gridley	Miniseries; 1 episode
1976	Truman at Potsdam	Winston Churchill	Television film
1976	Hazard's People	John Hazard	Television film
1976	Six Characters in Search of an Author	The Director	Television film
1976	The Six Million Dollar Man	Dr. Lee Franklin	Episode: "Kill Oscar: Part 2"
1976	The Bionic Woman	Dr. Lee Franklin	2 episodes
1976	Captains and the Kings	Judge Newell Chisholm	Miniseries; 2 episodes
1977	The American Short Story	Father Flynn	Episode: "The Displaced Person"
1977	Washington: Behind Closed Doors	Myron Dunn	Miniseries; 6 episodes
1977	The Best of Families	Himself (Host)	Miniseries
1977	Aspen	Joseph Merrill Drummond	Miniseries; 2 episodes
1978–86	The Paper Chase	Charles W. Kingsfield Jr.	Main cast; Seasons 1–4; Nominated – CableACE Award for Best Actor in a Dramatic Presentation; Nominated – Golden Globe Award for Best Actor – Television Series Drama (1978–1979)
1979	The Last Convertible	Dr. Wetherell	Miniseries; 3 episodes
1979	The French Atlantic Affair	Dr. Archady Clemens	Miniseries; 3 episodes
1980	The Associates	Professor Kingsfield	Episode: "Eliot's Revenge"
1980	Gideon's Trumpet	Earl Warren	Television film
1980	The Babysitter	Dr. Lindquist	Television film
1980	A Christmas Without Snow	Ephraim Adams	Television film
1982	Mork & Mindy	Milt	Episode: "Mork, Mindy, and Mearth Meet MILT"
1982	Marco Polo	Patriarch of Aquileia	Miniseries; 1 episode
1982–87	Silver Spoons	Edward Stratton Jr.	Recurring role; Seasons 1–5
1983	American Playhouse	Network Newscaster	Episode: "Network Newscaster"
1983	The Winds of War	Aaron Jastrow	Miniseries; 7 episodes Nominated – Golden Globe Award for Best Supporting Actor – Series, Miniseries or Television Film
1983	Freedom to Speak	Benjamin Franklin	Miniseries; 3 episodes
1985	A.D.	Gamaliel	Miniseries; 5 episodes
1988	Noble House	Sir Geoffrey Allison	Miniseries; 4 episodes
1988	Lincoln	Gen. Winfield Scott	Miniseries; 2 episodes
1988	227	Himself	Episode: "They're Playing Our Song"

==== As producer (television) ====
Year	Title	Notes
1957–58	The Seven Lively Arts	10 episodes
1958–59	Playhouse 90	7 episodes
1960	Dillinger	Television film
1963	The Great Adventure	3 episodes
1966	ABC Stage 67	Episode: "Evening Primrose"
1980	Gideon's Trumpet	Television film Nominated – Primetime Emmy Award for Outstanding Television Movie
1983	Choices of the Heart	Television film

== See also ==
- List of Academy Award winners and nominees from Great Britain
