= Ray Shanklin =

Composer

Bobby Ray Shanklin (June 4, 1947 - March 6, 2015) was a composer. Along with Ed Bogas, he co-composed the scores for Ralph Bakshi's films Fritz the Cat and Heavy Traffic.
