= The Jew in American Cinema =

1984 book by Patricia Erens

The Jew in American Cinema is a 1984 non-fiction book by Patricia Erens, published by Indiana University Press.

It originated from a PhD thesis.

== Reception ==
Allen Graubard criticized several "serious misunderstandings" and argued that the book does not succeed in analyzing impact on the Jewish people on American cinema, although he felt that there is "a modest value" in the work being "a film and pop culture scholarship reference".

Irwin R. Blacker of the Los Angeles Times felt that the author had "mature judgment" and "sensitivity" by using "a minimum of jargon".

Steven J. Whitfield of Brandeis University stated that the book has a lot of coverage but that it lacks "critical judgment" and information on "transformations" in society. Whitfield also stated there were errors in fact related to the Jewish ethnic studies realm. According to Whitfield, the book's grasp is stronger in the film realm.

== See also ==
- Jews in American cinema
