= Heavy Traffic =

1973 film by Ralph Bakshi

- Theatrical release poster
- Directed by: Ralph Bakshi
- Written by: Ralph Bakshi
- Produced by: Steve Krantz
- Starring: Joseph Kaufmann; Beverly Hope Atkinson; Frank Dekova; Terri Haven; Mary Dean Lauria
- Cinematography: Ted C. Bemiller; Gregg Heschong
- Edited by: Donald W. Ernst
- Music by: Ed Bogas; Ray Shanklin
- Production company: Steve Krantz Productions
- Distributed by: American International Pictures
- Release date: August 8, 1973
- Running time: 77 minutes
- Country: United States
- Languages: English; Italian; Yiddish
- Budget: $950,000
- Box office: $1,500,000 (US/ Canada rentals) or $2.3 million

Heavy Traffic is a 1973 American live-action/adult animated drama film written and directed by Ralph Bakshi. The film, which begins, ends, and occasionally combines with live-action, explores the often surreal fantasies of a young New York City cartoonist named Michael Corleone, using pinball imagery as a metaphor for inner-city life. Heavy Traffic was Bakshi and producer Steve Krantz's follow-up to the film Fritz the Cat. Though producer Krantz made varied attempts to produce an R-rated film, Heavy Traffic was given an X rating by the MPAA. The film received largely positive reviews and is widely considered to be Bakshi's biggest critical success.

== Plot ==
The film begins in live-action, introducing Michael Corleone, a twenty-two year-old virgin who plays pinball in New York City while asking himself philosophical questions before envisioning an animated and dangerous New York neighborhood. Michael's Italian father, Angelo "Angie" Corleone, is a sleazy, struggling mafioso who frequently cheats on Michael's Jewish mother, Ida, with his mistress, Molly. Angie and Ida constantly bicker and try to kill each other at every opportunity.

The unemployed Michael dabbles in cartoons and often wanders throughout the city to avoid family skirmishes and to artistically feed off the grubbiness of his environment. He regularly visits a local bar where he gets free drinks from his girlfriend and the black bartender, Carole, in exchange for sketches, which results in Shorty, Carole's violent, legless bouncer devotee, becoming jealous.

One of the regular customers at the bar, the cross-dressing Snowflake, gets beaten up by a tough drunk in a hard hat named Bongo after he discovers that Snowflake is a man and not a woman like he first thought. The masochistic Snowflake loves Bongo's assault, but the latter causes property damage. Shorty throws Bongo out and then brutally kills him soon after, while the bar's manager Mario abusively confronts Carole, provoking her into quitting.

Shorty offers to let Carole stay at his place. Not wanting to get involved with him, Carole tells Shorty that she's staying with Michael. Meanwhile, Angie manages a strike at a mob-controlled factory, but when he reveals his plan to replace the strikers with unemployed black workers, the Godfather abandons him in disapproval. Michael allows Carole to stay with him, but the Corleones' deteriorating domestic situation convinces Michael and Carole to move out of Michael's parents' apartment and try to earn enough money to move to California, in order to avoid Shorty, who's been stalking Carole since she quit the bar.

Michael attempts to pitch a comic strip idea to an elderly executive lying on his death bed. However, its abnormally dark tone overwhelms the executive, resulting in him dying during the pitch.

Meanwhile, Angie tries to use his Mafia connections to put a murder contract on Michael for "disgracing" the family by dating a black woman, but the Godfather refuses to do so as he feels he owes Angie nothing for his failures and because the hit he desires is "personal, not business". Angie realizes he is out of favor with the mob; drunk and depressed, he is seduced by Snowflake. However, Shorty eventually encounters Angie and agrees to fulfill the contract.

Meanwhile, Carole tries working as a taxi dancer, until she is fired when one of her customers she dances has a heart attack at the sight of her underwear.

Michael and Carole turn to crime as a means of getting by with Carole posing as a prostitute, flirting with a sleazy businessman and luring him into a hotel room where Michael beats him to death with a lead pipe so they can rob him. As the two walk out with the dead man's cash, Shorty arrives and shoots Michael in the head. In Michael's reality, following the conclusion of the animated story, he destroys a pinball machine in anger after it tilts (symbolizing the end of his fantasy) and walks out onto the street. He then bumps into the real Carole and follows her into a park, confronting her. The two are seen briefly arguing before they finally take each other's hands and begin happily waltzing in the park.

== Cast ==
- Joseph Kaufmann as Michael
- Beverly Hope Atkinson as Carole
- Frank de Kova as Angie
- Terri Haven as Ida
- Mary Dean Lauria as Molly
- Charles Gordone as Moe "Crazy Moe"
- Jim Bates as "Snowflake"
- Jacqueline Mills as Rosalyn
- Lillian Adams as Rosa
- Peter Hobbs as Jerry
- Candy Candido as Mafia Messenger

== Production ==
In 1969, Ralph's Spot was founded as a division of Bakshi Productions to produce commercials for Coca-Cola and Max, the 2000-Year-Old Mouse, a series of educational shorts paid for by Encyclopædia Britannica. However, Bakshi was uninterested in the kind of animation he was producing, and wanted to produce something personal. Bakshi soon developed Heavy Traffic, a tale of inner-city street life. Steve Krantz told Bakshi that studio executives would be unwilling to fund Heavy Traffic because of its content and Bakshi's lack of film experience. Bakshi directed Fritz the Cat (1972), an adaptation of Robert Crumb's comic strip of the same name. The financial success of Fritz the Cat allowed Bakshi to produce the film he had always intended to produce, and to focus on human characters rather than anthropomorphic animals. Bakshi pitched Heavy Traffic to Samuel Z. Arkoff, who took an interest in Bakshi's take on the "tortured underground cartoonist", and agreed to fund the film.

Production began in 1972. However, Steve Krantz had not yet paid Bakshi for his work on Fritz the Cat. Halfway through the production of Heavy Traffic, Bakshi asked Krantz outright when he would be paid, and Krantz responded that "The picture didn't make any money, Ralph. It's just a lot of noise." Bakshi found Krantz's claims to be dubious, as the producer had recently purchased a new BMW and a mansion in Beverly Hills. Because Bakshi did not have a lawyer, he sought advice from directors he had become friends with, including Martin Scorsese, Francis Ford Coppola, and Steven Spielberg, asking them how much they made on their films. Bakshi soon accused Krantz of ripping him off, which the producer denied. Bakshi began pitching his next project, Harlem Nights, a film loosely based on the Uncle Remus story books, which eventually became Coonskin. The idea interested producer Albert S. Ruddy during a screening of The Godfather.

While working on Heavy Traffic, Bakshi received a call from Krantz, who questioned him about Harlem Nights. Bakshi told Krantz: "I can't talk about that" and hung up. The next day, Krantz locked Bakshi out of the studio, reportedly tapping Bakshi's phone because he was wary of his loyalty as an employee. After Krantz fired Bakshi, he began to seek a replacement director for Heavy Traffic, calling several directors, including Chuck Jones. Arkoff threatened to pull the film's budget unless Krantz rehired Bakshi, who returned a week later. During the film's production, Krantz attempted to maintain some level of control by issuing memos to Bakshi and other artists requesting various changes. John Sparey remembers being issued a memo asking Sparey to stop posting caricatures of Krantz on the middle of his door.

Ed Bogas and Ray Shanklin returned to write and perform the film's score, as they had done for Bakshi's previous feature, Fritz the Cat. Other music featured in the film included the songs "Twist and Shout", performed by The Isley Brothers, "Take Five", as performed by the Dave Brubeck Quartet, and Chuck Berry's "Maybellene". "Scarborough Fair" is used as a recurring musical motif, first heard in the film's opening credits and later reappearing during the end of the film as performed by Sérgio Mendes and Brasil '66. Bogas also created several other arrangements of the song that appear throughout the film. A soundtrack album was released in 1973.

Joseph Kaufmann, who played Michael, was killed in a plane crash on September 4, 1973, less than a month after the film released. This would be his final film performance in his lifetime.

=== Directing ===
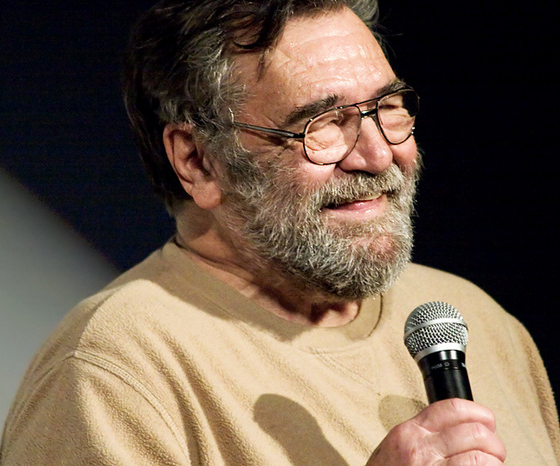
Ralph Bakshi in January 2009

Inspiration for the film came from penny arcades, where Bakshi would often spend his time playing pinball, sometimes bringing his 12-year-old son Mark. Bakshi wanted to use pinball as a metaphor to examine the ways of the world. Heavy Traffic began a tradition in which Bakshi would write poems before beginning production on each of his films, starting with Street Arabs. According to Bakshi, "My background was in Brooklyn — my Jewishness, my family life, my father coming from Russia. All these things had to be somehow represented on film."

Because Bakshi wanted the voices to sound organic, he experimented with improvisation, allowing his actors to ad lib during the recording sessions. According to James Bates, the voice of Snowflake, "I said, 'How about a little Wolfman Jack, Charles Nelson Reilly, Pearl Bailey and a little Truman Capote?' Ralph couldn't believe it. We ad-libbed a lot, and he usually got what he wanted in three or four takes. We worked hard and not for much coin, but it was a blast."

As with Fritz the Cat, Bakshi and Johnnie Vita took location photographs for the film's backgrounds. Instead of tracing the photographs onto backgrounds, as they had done in Fritz the Cat, the film uses actual photographs and live-action stock footage as backgrounds for much of the film. Bakshi and Vita were also experimental in their photography: Bakshi requested that the lab technicians produce several prints for every photo, each print increasingly out of focus, giving the backgrounds a fuzzy quality. Bakshi states that "We didn't want to risk shooting [out of focus] on the spot. That could have meant making some expensive mistakes."

=== Animation ===
According to animator Mark Kausler, Krantz was so nervous about showing too much nudity and sexual activities that he had several versions of some sequences animated, for instance, in the "Maybellene" animation sequence. Kausler says that a sequence was animated in which the viewer sees "the key in the ignition metamorphose into a penis entering Maybelline's vagina". This sequence was deleted from Heavy Traffic, but the same action appeared in the film Down and Dirty Duck. Kausler also states:

I covered this scene with another one of the key changing into the fat black guy, and the ignition slot turning into Maybellene. I covered a lot more cartoony foreplay scenes with a simple close-up of the fat black man's face with his hand covering his eyes. You can get a sense of how many scenes had to be altered, by how many times this close-up drawing was used. It got used a lot! At one point the original version "A" of Maybellene existed. Ralph had a print of it, but I have not seen it since I worked on it. We did versions "A," B", and "C", with "C" being the tamest and that is what got into the so-called "X" version of Heavy Traffic. Another scene I can recall doing multiple versions of was the guy in the racing cap, pissing on the fat black guy's ass. This was eliminated, causing a jump in the action.

Edward Hopper's 1942 painting Nighthawks was used as a background in one of the film's sequences. Several animation sequences appear as rough sketchbook pages, including a dream sequence influenced by the work of Otto Messmer and a George Herriman-influenced sequence set to Chuck Berry's "Maybellene".

=== Films re-used ===
- Red Dust (1932)
- 42nd Street (1933)
- The Gang's All Here (1943)

=== Music ===
The film's score was composed by Ed Bogas and Ray Shanklin. The soundtrack was released by Fantasy Records and Ampex Tapes in 1973. The album was released on compact disc in 1996 as part of a compilation that featured on the same disc the soundtracks to both Fritz the Cat and Heavy Traffic. The film also featured songs by Sérgio Mendes and Brasil '66, The Isley Brothers, Dave Brubeck, and Chuck Berry.

== Reception ==
Although Heavy Traffic received an X rating from the Motion Picture Association of America, more theaters were willing to screen adult-oriented animated features because of the success of Fritz the Cat, and thus Heavy Traffic was a box office success. Ralph Bakshi was the first person in the animation industry since Walt Disney to have two financially successful films back-to-back. The film was banned by the film censorship board in the Canadian province of Alberta when it was originally released.

Heavy Traffic is considered to be Bakshi's biggest critical success. Newsweek wrote that the film contained 'black humor, powerful grotesquerie and peculiar raw beauty. Episodes of violence and sexuality are both explicit and parodies of flesh-and-blood porn ... a celebration of urban decay'. Roger Greenspun, of The New York Times, wrote in his 1973 review: 'People who felt that his earlier feature, Fritz the Cat, merely debased a cherished original, can now judge Bakshi's development of his own material. I think that development is as brilliant as anything in recent movies — as brilliant and, in its own improbable way, as lovely and as sad.' Charles Champlin wrote in the Los Angeles Times that the film was 'a further leaping step forward for American animation; at that, Heavy Traffic is, in its furious energy, uncomfortable to watch as often as it is hilarious'. Gene Siskel of the Chicago Tribune gave the film three stars out of four, and wrote that 'by mixing live-action and animation, Bakshi generates a willingness in us to be moved in some 'aw, shucks' ways that are corny, but feel good'. The Hollywood Reporter called it "shocking, outrageous, offensive, sometimes incoherent, occasionally unintelligent; however, it is also an authentic work of movie art and Bakshi is certainly the most creative American animator since Disney". Vincent Canby ranked it among his "Ten Best Films of 1973". Gary Arnold, of The Washington Post, was negative, calling the film 'ostentatiously ugly' with 'nothing pleasurable or liberating in [Bakshi's] style of mockery'. The film holds a score of 89% on the review aggregator Rotten Tomatoes, based on 18 reviews.

Michael Barrier, an animation historian, described Heavy Traffic and Fritz the Cat as 'not merely provocative, but highly ambitious'. He described the films as an effort 'to push beyond what was done in the old cartoons, even while building on their strengths'.

== Home video ==
Warner Home Video released the film on VHS and Betamax in the 1980s. In the UK, Heavy Traffic was released in 1984 with a runtime of 70 minutes. In Ireland, the film was renamed Flipper City, and released by Thorn EMI in 1985 with a runtime of 60 minutes. It was rated R on the VHS slipcover, but the label said that it was an X-rated film. An R-rated version was released on VHS and Region 1 DVD by MGM Home Entertainment in 1999. On July 16, 2013, Shout! Factory and MGM released Heavy Traffic on Blu-ray for its 40th anniversary. The film would be re-released on Blu-ray and DVD by Sandpiper Pictures on December 17, 2024.

== See also ==
- List of American films of 1973
