= 64th Annual Grammy Awards =

2022 US music awards ceremony

- Official poster
- Date: April 3, 2022
- Location: MGM Grand Garden Arena; Paradise, Nevada
- Hosted by: Trevor Noah

Highlights
- Most awards: Jon Batiste (5)
- Most nominations: Jon Batiste (11)
- Website: grammy.com

Television/radio coverage
- Network: CBS
- Viewership: 9.59 million

The 64th Annual Grammy Awards ceremony was held at the MGM Grand Garden Arena in Las Vegas on April 3, 2022. It recognized the best recordings, compositions, and artists of the eligibility year, running from September 1, 2020, to September 30, 2021. The nominations were revealed via a virtual livestream on November 23, 2021. The performers for the ceremony were announced on March 15, 24, and 30, 2022. South African comedian Trevor Noah, who hosted the previous ceremony in 2021, returned as host. The ceremony's location marked the first time the Recording Academy switched host cities for a single ceremony. This also makes it the first Grammy Awards ceremony not to be held in either New York City or Los Angeles since the 15th Grammy Awards in 1973 when it was held at the Tennessee Theatre in Nashville, Tennessee. It marked the first time the telecast took place in Las Vegas.

Jon Batiste received the most nominations with eleven, followed by Doja Cat, H.E.R., and Justin Bieber with eight each. Batiste received the most awards with five, and won Album of the Year for We Are. Silk Sonic won Record of the Year and Song of the Year for "Leave the Door Open", and Olivia Rodrigo won Best New Artist.

The ceremony was originally scheduled for January 31, 2022, at the Crypto.com Arena in Los Angeles; however, on January 5, 2022, the Recording Academy postponed the ceremony indefinitely due to health and safety concerns related to the COVID-19 Omicron variant. On January 18, 2022, the ceremony was rescheduled to April 3, 2022, and its location was moved to the MGM Grand Garden Arena in Las Vegas, due to resultant scheduling conflicts with the Crypto.com Arena.

== Background ==
The nominations were announced during a virtual livestream on November 23, 2021, by Recording Academy CEO Harvey Mason Jr., alongside Jon Batiste, Billie Eilish, Finneas O'Connell, H.E.R., BTS, Måneskin, Tayla Parx, Carly Pearce, comedian Nate Bargatze, Recording Academy chair Tammy Hurt, and CBS Mornings anchor Gayle King. The academy announced Trevor Noah to return as the host of the ceremony.

=== Category changes ===
For the 2022 ceremony, the academy announced several changes for different categories and rules:

- For the General Field, the number of nominees in each category was increased from eight to ten
- Package Field, Notes Field, and Historical Field were renamed and consolidated to Package, Notes & Historical Field
- Production, Non-Classical Field; Production, Immersive Field; and Production, Classical Field were renamed and consolidated to Production Field
- Two categories, Best Global Music Performance and Best Música Urbana Album, were added, bringing the total number of categories to 86
- Best Dance Recording was renamed Best Dance/Electronic Recording
- For Album of the Year, all credited artists (including those featured), "songwriters of new material, producers, recording engineers, mixers, and mastering engineers are eligible" to be nominated and win the category as recipients
- For Classical Field, singles became eligible for Best Orchestral Performance, Best Choral Performance, Best Chamber Music/Small Ensemble Performance, Best Classical Instrumental Solo, and Best Contemporary Classical Composition
- For Best Compilation Soundtrack for Visual Media, the following rules were updated:
  - For albums consisting of pre-existing masters, up to two producers and two music supervisors will be nominated and/or awarded
  - For albums consisting of new recordings and principal artists with significant performances, up to three producers (or four in extraordinary circumstances) and two music supervisors will be nominated and/or awarded along with an engineer/mixer "who contributes greater than 50% playing time of newly recorded material"
- For Music Film Field, music-related documentaries must contain at least 51% of "performance-based material or individual music videos that together create a visual album" while "films with fictional elements are eligible"
- Another Technical Grammy Award was added and will be awarded to individuals who "dramatically pushed boundaries and made groundbreaking, important, outstanding, and influential contributions of technical excellence and innovation to the recording field"

=== Nomination changes ===
For the 2022 ceremony, the Recording Academy opted to eliminate its nomination review committees, which were previously responsible for determining the nominees of each category. Nominees would be solely decided based on votes from the Recording Academy.

=== Voting changes ===
For the 2022 ceremony and during both voting rounds, the number of categories members of the Recording Academy were allowed to vote in was reduced to ten, on top of the four major categories. The ten categories could belong to up to three different fields, including the genre fields. The changes were made to "help ensure the quality of voting".

=== Nomination withdrawals ===
Drake was initially announced as a nominee for Best Rap Performance (for "Way 2 Sexy") and Best Rap Album (for Certified Lover Boy), but withdrew from contention for both awards on December 6, 2021. The Recording Academy subsequently honored Drake's request and officially removed his nominations for both awards.

=== Postponement and relocation ===
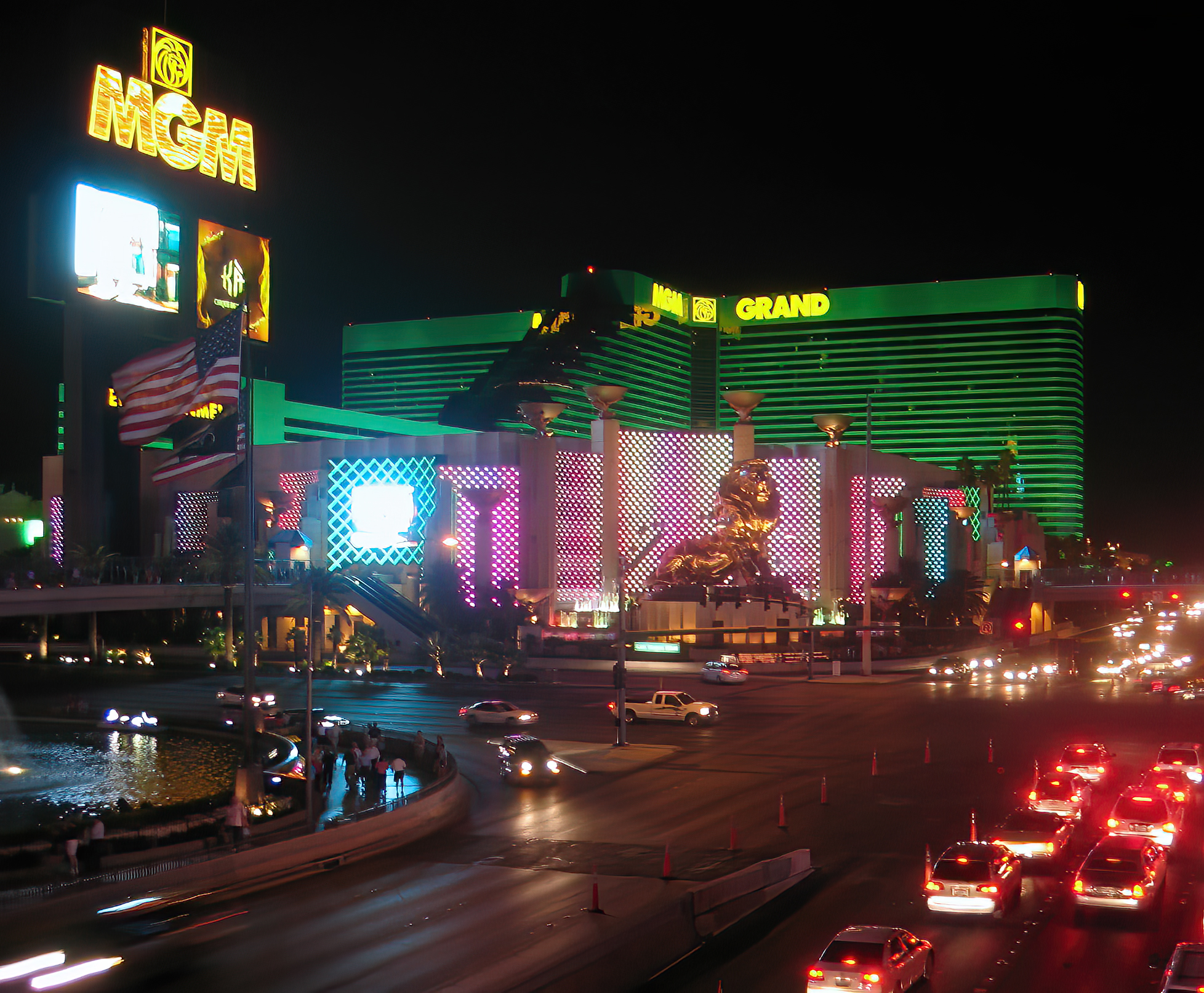
The MGM Grand Garden Arena at the MGM Grand Las Vegas (pictured) hosted the Grammy Awards after its postponement and relocation

The ceremony was originally scheduled to be held on January 31, 2022, at the Crypto.com Arena in Los Angeles. On January 5, 2022, the Recording Academy postponed the ceremony indefinitely due to health and safety concerns related to the COVID-19 Omicron variant. With the Crypto.com Arena booked with sports games and concerts nearly every night through mid-April, the academy decided to switch the ceremony's location to the MGM Grand Garden Arena in Las Vegas. The MGM Grand Garden Arena hosted the Latin Grammy Awards for six years, including the 22nd Annual Latin Grammy Awards in November 2021.

== Performers ==
=== Premiere ceremony ===
The performers for the ceremony were announced on March 25, 2022.

List of performers at the premiere ceremony
| Artist(s) | Song(s) |
|---|---|
| Madison Cunningham Falu Nnenna Freelon Kalani Peʻa John Popper The Isaacs | "Dance to the Music" |
| Allison Russell | "Nightflyer" |
| Jimmie Allen | "Down Home" |
| Mon Laferte | "La Mujer" |
| Curtis Stewart | "Isn't She Lovely" |
| Ledisi | "Ne Me Quitte Pas (Don't Leave Me)" |

=== Main ceremony ===
The performers for the ceremony were announced on March 15, 24, and 30, 2022.

List of performers at the 64th Annual Grammy Awards
| Artist(s) | Song(s) |
|---|---|
| Silk Sonic | "777" "Hot Music" |
| Olivia Rodrigo | "Drivers License" |
| J Balvin | "Qué Más Pues?" (with María Becerra) "In da Getto" |
| BTS | "Butter" |
| Aymée Nuviola | "La Gota Fría" |
| Lil Nas X | Medley: "Dead Right Now" "Montero (Call Me by Your Name)" "Industry Baby" (with Jack Harlow) |
| Billie Eilish | "Happier Than Ever" |
| Brandi Carlile | "Right on Time" |
| Nas | Medley: "I Can" "Made You Look" "One Mic" "Rare" |
| Chris Stapleton | "Cold" |
| Maverick City Music | "Jireh" |
| John Legend Siuzanna Iglidan Mika Newton Lyuba Yakimchuk | Tribute to Ukraine: "Free" |
| Lady Gaga | Tribute to Tony Bennett: "Love for Sale" "Do I Love You?" |
| Billy Strings | "Hide and Seek" |
| Cynthia Erivo Ben Platt Leslie Odom Jr. Rachel Zegler | In Memoriam Segment: "Not a Day Goes By" "Send in the Clowns" "Somewhere" |
| Jon Batiste | "Freedom" |
| Justin Bieber Giveon Daniel Caesar | "Peaches" |
| H.E.R. | "Damage" (featuring Jimmy Jam and Terry Lewis) "We Made It" "Are You Gonna Go My Way" (featuring Travis Barker and Lenny Kravitz) |
| Carrie Underwood | "Ghost Story" |
| Brothers Osborne | "Dead Man's Curve" |

Foo Fighters were announced as a performer on March 24, one day before the death of their drummer Taylor Hawkins. The band canceled their performance at the ceremony on March 31. A tribute montage dedicated to Hawkins and set to "My Hero" was aired during the ceremony before the in memoriam segment.

The Recording Academy banned Kanye West—who was nominated for five awards—from performing, citing his "concerning online behavior". NPR and Variety tied the decision to West's outbursts regarding his divorce from Kim Kardashian, his harassment of Kardashian's then-boyfriend Pete Davidson, and an Instagram post in which he insulted Noah using a racial slur. The decision was criticized by Noah, who said he did not want to "cancel" West, and the Game, who argued it was disrespectful to hip-hop.

== Presenters ==
Premiere ceremony

- LeVar Burton – host
- Sylvan Esso
- Arlo Parks
- Nnenna and Pierce Freelon
- Jimmie Allen
- Nate Bargatze
- Jimmy Jam

Main ceremony

- Questlove – presented Song of the Year
- Anthony Mackie and Kelsea Ballerini – presented Best Country Album
- Dua Lipa and Megan Thee Stallion – presented Best New Artist
- Bonnie Raitt and Joni Mitchell – introduced Brandi Carlile
- Ludacris – presented Best Rap Performance
- Volodymyr Zelenskyy – introduced John Legend, Siuzanna Iglidan, Mika Newton and Lyuba Yakimchuk
- Tony Bennett – introduced Lady Gaga
- Billy Porter – presented Best R&B Album
- Jared Leto – presented Best Pop Vocal Album
- Avril Lavigne – presented Best Pop Duo/Group Performance
- Keith Urban – presented Record of the Year
- Lenny Kravitz – presented Album of the Year

== Winners and nominees ==
Winners appear first and highlighted in bold.

=== General field ===
Record of the Year

- **"Leave the Door Open" – Silk Sonic**
  - **Dernst "D'Mile" Emile II and Bruno Mars, producers; Şerban Ghenea, John Hanes and Charles Moniz, engineers/mixers; Randy Merrill, mastering engineer**
- "I Still Have Faith in You" – ABBA
  - Benny Andersson and Björn Ulvaeus, producers; Benny Andersson and Bernard Löhr, engineers/mixers; Björn Engelmann, mastering engineer
- "Freedom" – Jon Batiste
  - Jon Batiste, Kizzo and Autumn Rowe, producers; Russ Elevado, Kizzo and Manny Marroquin, engineers/mixers; Emerson Mancini, mastering engineer
- "I Get a Kick Out of You" – Tony Bennett and Lady Gaga
  - Dae Bennett, producer; Dae Bennett and Josh Coleman, engineers/mixers; Greg Calbi and Steve Fallone, mastering engineers
- "Peaches" – Justin Bieber featuring Daniel Caesar and Giveon
  - Josh Gudwin, Harv, Shndō and Andrew Watt producers; Josh Gudwin and Andrew Watt, engineers/mixers; Colin Leonard, mastering engineer
- "Right on Time" – Brandi Carlile
  - Dave Cobb and Shooter Jennings, producers; Brandon Bell and Tom Elmhirst, engineers/mixers; Pete Lyman, mastering engineer
- "Kiss Me More" – Doja Cat featuring SZA
  - Rogét Chahayed, tizhimself and Yeti Beats, producers; Rob Bisel, Şerban Ghenea, Rian Lewis and Joe Visciano, engineers/mixers; Mike Bozzi, mastering engineer
- "Happier Than Ever" – Billie Eilish
  - Finneas O'Connell, producer; Billie Eilish, O'Connell and Rob Kinelski, engineers/mixers; Dave Kutch, mastering engineer
- "Montero (Call Me by Your Name)" – Lil Nas X
  - Omer Fedi, Roy Lenzo and Take a Daytrip, producers; Denzel Baptiste, Şerban Ghenea and Roy Lenzo, engineers/mixers; Chris Gehringer, mastering engineer
- "Drivers License" – Olivia Rodrigo
  - Daniel Nigro, producer; Mitch McCarthy and Nigro, engineers/mixers; Randy Merrill, mastering engineer

Album of the Year

- **We Are – Jon Batiste**
  - **Craig Adams, David Gauthier, Braedon Gautier, Brennon Gautier, Gospel Soul Children Choir, Hot 8 Brass Band, PJ Morton, Autumn Rowe, Zadie Smith, St. Augustine High School Marching 100 and Trombone Shorty, featured artists; Jon Batiste, Mikey Freedom Hart, King Garbage, Kizzo, Sunny Levine, Nate Mercereau, David Pimentel, Ricky Reed, Autumn Rowe, Jahaan Sweet and Nick Waterhouse, producers; Batiste, Russ Elevado, Mischa Kachkachishvili, Kizzo, Joseph Lorge, Manny Marroquin, Pimentel, Reed, Jaclyn Sanchez, Matt Vertere, Marc Whitmore and Alex Williams, engineers/mixers; Andrae Alexander, Troy Andrews, Batiste, Zach Cooper, Vic Dimotsis, Eric Frederic, Kizzo, Levine, Steve McEwan, Morton, Rowe and Mavis Staples, songwriters; Emerson Mancini, mastering engineer**
- Love for Sale - Tony Bennett and Lady Gaga
  - Dae Bennett, producer; Bennett, Josh Coleman and Billy Cumella, engineers/mixers; Greg Calbi and Steve Fallone, mastering engineers
- Justice (Triple Chucks Deluxe) – Justin Bieber
  - Beam, Benny Blanco, Burna Boy, Daniel Caesar, Chance the Rapper, DaBaby, Dominic Fike, Giveon, Jaden, Tori Kelly, Khalid, the Kid Laroi, Lil Uzi Vert and Quavo, featured artists; Amy Allen, Louis Bell, Jon Bellion, Bieber, Blanco, BMW Kenny, Capi, Dreamlab, DVLP, Jason Evigan, Finneas, the Futuristics, German, Josh Gudwin, Jimmie Gutch, Harv, Marvin "Tony" Hemmings, Ilya, Rodney "Darkchild" Jerkins, Stefan Johnson, KCdaproducer, Denis Kosiak, the Monsters & Strangerz, Jorgen Odegard, Michael Pollack, Poo Bear, Shndo, Skrillex, Jake Torrey, Trackz, Andrew Watt and Ido Zmishlany, producers; Cory Bice, Blanco, Kevin "Capi" Carbo, Edwin Diaz, DJ Durel, Dreamlab, Finneas, Josh Gudwin, Sam Holland, Daniel James, Antonio Kearney, Denis Kosiak, Paul LaMalfa, Jeremy Lertola, Devin Nakao, Chris "Tek" O'Ryan, Andres Osorio, Micah Pettit and Benjamin Thomas, engineers/mixers; Allen, Delacey (Brittany Amaradio), Bell, Jonathan Bellion, Chancellor Johnathon Bennett, Bieber, David Bowden, Jason Boyd, Scott Braun, Tommy Lee Brown, Valentin Brunn, Kevin Carbo, Kenneth Coby, Kevin Coby, Raul Cubina, Jordan Douglas, Giveon Dezmann Evans, Jason Evigan, Dominic David Fike, Kameron Glasper, Jacob Greenspan, Josh Gudwin, James Gutch, Scott Harris, Bernard Harvey, Leah Haywood, Gregory Aldae Hein, Marvin Hemmings, Jeffrey Howard, Alexander Izquierdo, Daniel James, Jace Logan Jennings, Rodney Jerkins, Jordan K. Johnson, Stefan Johnson, Anthony M. Jones, Antonio Kearney, Charlton Kenneth, Joe Khajadourian, Felisha "Fury" King, Jonathan Lyndale Kirk, Matthew Sean Leon, Benjamin Levin, Marcus Lomax, Quavious Keyate Marshall, Luis Manuel Martinez Jr., Sonny Moore, Finneas O’Connell, Jorgen Odegard, Damini Ebunoluwa Ogulu, Tayla Parx, Oliver Peterhof, Whitney Phillips, Michael Pollack, Khalid Donnel Robinson, Ilya Salmanzadeh, Alex Schwartz, Tia Scola, Aaron Simmonds, Ashton Simmonds, Gian Stone, Ali Tamposi, Ryan Tedder, Tyshane Thompson, Jake Torrey, Billy Walsh, Freddy Wexler, Symere Woods, Andrew Wotman, Rami Yacoub, Keavan Yazdani, Bigram Zayas and Ido Zmishlany, songwriters; Colin Leonard, mastering engineer
- Planet Her (Deluxe) – Doja Cat
  - Eve, Ariana Grande, Gunna, JID, SZA, the Weeknd and Young Thug, featured artists; Aaron Bow, Rogét Chahayed, Crate Classics, Digi, Dr. Luke, Fallen, Mayer Hawthorne, Mike Hector, Linden Jay, Aynzli Jones, Kurtis McKenzie, Jason Quenneville, Reef, Khaled Rohaim, Al Shux, Sully, tizhimself, Yeti Beats and Y2K, producers; Rob Bisel, Jesse Ray Ernster, Şerban Ghenea, Clint Gibbs, Rian Lewis, NealHPogue, Tyler Sheppard, Kalani Thompson, Joe Visciano and Jeff Ellis Worldwide, engineers/mixers; Ilana Armida, Aaron Bow, Rogét Chahayed, Jamil Chammas, Sheldon Yu-Ting Cheung, Antwoine Collins, Amala Zandile Dlamini, Lukasz Gottwald, Ariana Grande, Mayer Hawthorne, Mike Hector, Aaron Horn, Taneisha Damielle Jackson, Linden Jay, Eve Jihan Jeffers, Aynzli Jones, Sergio Kitchens, Carter Lang, Siddharth Mallick, Maciej Margol-Gromada, Kurtis McKenzie, Jidenna Mobisson, Gerard A. Powell II, Geordan Reid-Campbell, Khaled Rohaim, Destin Route, Solána Rowe, Laura Roy, Al Shuckburgh, David Sprecher, Ari Starace, Lee Stashenko, Abel Tesfaye, Rob Tewlow and Jeffery Lamar Williams, songwriters; Dale Becker and Mike Bozzi, mastering engineers
- Happier Than Ever - Billie Eilish
  - Finneas, producer; Billie Eilish, Finneas and Rob Kinelski, engineers/mixers; Eilish and Finneas, songwriters; John Greenham and Dave Kutch, mastering engineers
- Back of My Mind - H.E.R.
  - Chris Brown, Cordae, DJ Khaled, Lil Baby, Thundercat, Bryson Tiller, Ty Dolla Sign, YG and Yung Bleu, featured artists; Tarik Azzouz, Bordeaux, Nelson Bridges, DJ Camper, Cardiak, Cardo, Chi Chi, Steven J. Collins, Flip, Jeff "Gitty" Gitelman, Grades, H.E.R., Hit-Boy, Rodney "Darkchild" Jerkins, Walter Jones, Kaytranada, DJ Khaled, Mario Luciano, Mike Will Made-It, NonNative, Nova Wav, Scribz Riley, Jeff Robinson, Streetrunner, Hue Strother, Asa Taccone, Thundercat, Thurdi and Wu10, producers; Rafael Fai Bautista, Luis Bordeaux, Dee Brown, Anthony Cruz, Ayanna Depas, Morning Estrada, Chris Galland, H.E.R., Jaycen Joshua, Kaytranada, Derek Keota, Omar Loya, Manny Marroquin, Tim McClain, Juan "AyoJuan" Peña, Micah Petit, Patrizio Pigliapoco, Alex Pyle, Jaclyn Sanchez, Miki Tsutsumi and Tito "Earcandy" Vasquez, engineers/mixers; Denisia "Blu June" Andrews, Nasri Atweh, Tarik Azzouz, Stacy Barthe, Jeremy Biddle, Nelson "Keyz" Bridges, Chris Brown, Stephen Bruner, Darhyl Camper Jr., Luis Campozano, Louis Kevin Celestin, Anthony Clemons Jr., Steven J. Collins, Ronald "Flip" Colson, Brittany "Chi" Coney, Elijah Dias, Cordae Dunston, Jeff Gitelman, Tyrone Griffin Jr., Priscilla "Priscilla Renea" Hamilton, H.E.R., Charles A. Hinshaw, Chauncey Hollis, Latisha Twana Hyman, Keenon Daequan Ray Jackson, Rodney Jerkins, Dominique Jones, Khaled Khaled, Ron Latour, Gamal "Lunchmoney" Lewis, Mario Luciano, Carl McCormick, Leon McQuay III, Julia Michaels, Maxx Moore, Vurdell "V. Script" Muller, Chidi Osondu, Karriem Riggins, Mike "Scribz" Riley, Seandrea Sledge, Hue Strother, Asa Taccone, Tiara Thomas, Bryson Tiller, Daniel James Traynor, Brendan Walsh, Nicholas Warwar, Jabrile Hashim Williams, Michael L. Williams II, Robert Williams and Kelvin Wooten, songwriters; Dave Kutch and Colin Leonard, mastering engineers
- Montero – Lil Nas X
  - Miley Cyrus, Doja Cat, Jack Harlow, Elton John and Megan Thee Stallion, featured artists; Take a Daytrip, John Cunningham, Omer Fedi, Kuk Harrell, Jasper Harris, KBeaZy, Carter Lang, Nick Lee, Roy Lenzo, Tom Levesque, Jasper Sheff, Blake Slatkin, Drew Sliger, Take a Daytrip, Ryan Tedder and Kanye West, producers; Denzel Baptiste, David Biral, Jon Castelli, John Cunningham, Jelli Dorman, Tom Elmhirst, Şerban Ghenea, Kuk Harrell, Roy Lenzo, Manny Marroquin, Nickie Jon Pabon, Patrizio 'Teezio' Pigliapoco, Blake Slatkin, Drew Sliger, Ryan Tedder and Joe Visciano, engineers/mixers; Keegan Bach, Denzel Baptiste, David Biral, John Cunningham, Miley Cyrus, Amala Zandile Dlamini, Omer Fedi, Vincent Goodyer, Jack Harlow, Jasper Harris, Montero Hill, Isley Juber, Carter Lang, Nick Lee, Roy Lenzo, Thomas James Levesque, Andrew Luce, Michael Olmo, Jasper Sheff, Blake Slatkin, Ryan Tedder, William K. Ward and Kanye West, songwriters; Chris Gehringer, Eric Lagg and Randy Merrill, mastering engineers
- Sour – Olivia Rodrigo
  - Alexander 23, Daniel Nigro and Olivia Rodrigo, producers; Ryan Linvill, Mitch McCarthy and Daniel Nigro, engineers/mixers; Daniel Nigro, Olivia Rodrigo and Casey Smith, songwriters; Randy Merrill, mastering engineer
- Evermore – Taylor Swift
  - Bon Iver, Haim and the National, featured artists; Jack Antonoff, Aaron Dessner, Bryce Dessner and Taylor Swift, producers; Thomas Bartlett, JT Bates, Robin Baynton, Stuart Bogie, Gabriel Cabezas, CJ Camerieri, Aaron Dessner, Bryce Dessner, Scott Devendorf, Matt DiMona, Jon Gautier, Trevor Hagen, Mikey Freedom Hart, Sean Hutchinson, Josh Kaufman, Benjamin Lanz, Nick Lloyd, Jonathan Low, James McAlister, Dave Nelson, Sean O'Brien, Ryan Olson, Ariel Rechtshaid, Kyle Resnick, Laura Sisk, Evan Smith, Alex Sopp and Justin Vernon, engineers/mixers; Jack Antonoff, William Bowery, Aaron Dessner, Bryce Dessner, Taylor Swift and Justin Vernon, songwriters; Greg Calbi and Steve Fallone, mastering engineers
- Donda – Kanye West
  - Baby Keem, Chris Brown, Conway the Machine, DaBaby, Jay Electronica, Fivio Foreign, Westside Gunn, JAY-Z, Syleena Johnson, Kid Cudi, Lil Baby, Lil Durk, Lil Yachty, the Lox, Marilyn Manson, Playboi Carti, Pop Smoke, Roddy Ricch, Rooga, Travis Scott, Shenseea, Swizz Beatz, Young Thug, Don Toliver, Ty Dolla Sign, Vory and the Weeknd, featured artists; Allday, Audi, AyoAA, Roark Bailey, Louis Bell, Jeff Bhasker, Boi-1da, BoogzDaBeast, Warryn Campbell, Cubeatz, David & Eli, Mike Dean, Dem Jointz, Digital Nas, DJ Khalil, DrtWrk, 88-Keys, E*vax, FnZ, Gesaffelstein, Nikki Grier, Cory Henry, Ronny J, DJ Khalil, Wallis Lane, Digital Nas, Nascent, Ojivolta, Shuko, Sloane, Sean Solymar, Sucuki, Arron "Arrow" Sunday, Swizz Beatz, Zen Tachi, 30 Roc, Bastian Völkel, Mia Wallis, Kanye West, Wheezy and Jason White, producers; Josh Berg, Todd Bergman, Rashade Benani Bevel Sr., Will Chason, Dem Jointz, Irko, Jess Jackson, Nagaris Johnson, Shin Kamiyama, Gimel "Young Guru" Keaton, James Kelso, Scott McDowell, Kalam Ali Muttalib, Jonathan Pfarr, Jonathan Pfzar, Drrique Rendeer, Alejandro Rodriguez-Dawson, Mikalai Skrobat, Devon Wilson and Lorenzo Wolff, engineers/mixers; Dwayne Abernathy Jr., Elpadaro F. Electronica Allah, Aswad Asif, Roark Bailey, Durk Banks, Sam Barsh, Christoph Bauss, Louis Bell, Jeff Bhasker, Isaac De Boni, Christopher Brown, Jahshua Brown, Tahrence Brown, Aaron Butts, Warryn Campbell, Hykeem Carter Jr., Jordan Terrell Carter, Shawn Carter, Denzel Charles, Raul Cubina, Isaac De Boni, Kasseem Dean, Michael Dean, Tim Friedrich, Wesley Glass, Samuel Gloade, Kevin Gomringer, Tim Gomringer, Tyrone Griffin Jr., Jahmal Gwin, Cory Henry, Tavoris Javon Hollins Jr., Larry Hoover Jr., Bashar Jackson, Sean Jacob, Nima Jahanbin, Paimon Jahanbin, Syleena Johnson, Dominique Armani Jones, Eli Klughammer, Chinsea Lee, Mike Lévy, Evan Mast, Mark Mbogo, Miles McCollum, Josh Mease, Scott Mescudi, Brian Miller, Rodrick Wayne Moore Jr., Michael Mulé, Mark Myrie, Charles M. Njapa, Nasir Pemberton, Carlos St. John Phillips, Jason Phillips, Khalil Abdul Rahman, Laraya Ashlee Robinson, Christopher Ruelas, David Ruoff, Maxie Lee Ryles III, Matthew Samuels, Daniel Seeff, Eric Sloan Jr., Sean Solymar, Ronald O’Neill Spence Jr., David Styles, Michael Suski, Aqeel Tate, Abel Makkonen Tesfaye, Caleb Zackery Toliver, Bastian Völkel, Brian Hugh Warner, Jacques Webster II, Kanye West, Orlando Wilder, Jeffery Williams and Mark Williams, songwriters; Irko, mastering engineer

Song of the Year

- **"Leave the Door Open"**
  - **Brandon Anderson, Christopher Brody Brown, Dernst Emile II and Bruno Mars, songwriters (Silk Sonic)**
- "Bad Habits"
  - Fred Gibson, Johnny McDaid and Ed Sheeran, songwriters (Sheeran)
- "A Beautiful Noise"
  - Ruby Amanfu, Brandi Carlile, Brandy Clark, Alicia Keys, Hillary Lindsey, Lori McKenna, Linda Perry and Hailey Whitters, songwriters (Keys and Carlile)
- "Drivers License"
  - Daniel Nigro and Olivia Rodrigo, songwriters (Rodrigo)
- "Fight for You"
  - Dernst Emile II, H.E.R. and Tiara Thomas, songwriters (H.E.R.)
- "Happier Than Ever"
  - Billie Eilish and Finneas O'Connell, songwriters (Eilish)
- "Kiss Me More"
  - Rogét Chahayed, Amala Zandile Dlamini, Lukasz Gottwald, Carter Lang, Gerard A. Powell II, Solána Rowe and David Sprecher, songwriters (Doja Cat featuring SZA)
- "Montero (Call Me by Your Name)"
  - Denzel Baptiste, David Biral, Omer Fedi, Montero Hill and Roy Lenzo, songwriters (Lil Nas X)
- "Peaches"
  - Louis Bell, Justin Bieber, Giveon Dezmann Evans, Bernard Harvey, Felisha "Fury" King, Matthew Sean Leon, Luis Manuel Martinez Jr., Aaron Simmonds, Ashton Simmonds, Andrew Wotman and Keavan Yazdani, songwriters (Bieber featuring Daniel Caesar and Giveon)
- "Right on Time"
  - Brandi Carlile, Dave Cobb, Phil Hanseroth and Tim Hanseroth, songwriters (Carlile)

Best New Artist

- **Olivia Rodrigo**
- Arooj Aftab
- Jimmie Allen
- Baby Keem
- Finneas
- Glass Animals
- Japanese Breakfast
- The Kid Laroi
- Arlo Parks
- Saweetie

=== Pop ===
Best Pop Solo Performance

- **"Drivers License" – Olivia Rodrigo**
- "Anyone" – Justin Bieber
- "Right on Time" – Brandi Carlile
- "Happier Than Ever" – Billie Eilish
- "Positions" – Ariana Grande

Best Pop Duo/Group Performance

- **"Kiss Me More" – Doja Cat featuring SZA**
- "I Get a Kick Out of You" – Tony Bennett and Lady Gaga
- "Lonely" – Justin Bieber and Benny Blanco
- "Butter" – BTS
- "Higher Power" – Coldplay

Best Traditional Pop Vocal Album

- **Love for Sale – Tony Bennett and Lady Gaga**
- Til We Meet Again (Live) – Norah Jones
- A Tori Kelly Christmas – Tori Kelly
- Ledisi Sings Nina – Ledisi
- That's Life – Willie Nelson
- A Holly Dolly Christmas – Dolly Parton

Best Pop Vocal Album

- **Sour – Olivia Rodrigo**
- Justice (Triple Chucks Deluxe) – Justin Bieber
- Planet Her (Deluxe) – Doja Cat
- Happier Than Ever – Billie Eilish
- Positions – Ariana Grande

=== Dance/Electronic music ===
Best Dance/Electronic Recording

- **"Alive" – Rüfüs Du Sol**
  - **Jason Evigan and Rüfüs Du Sol, producers; Cassian Stewart-Kasimba, mixer**
- "Hero" – Afrojack and David Guetta
  - Afrojack, David Guetta, Kuk Harrell and Stargate, producers; Elio Debets, mixer
- "Loom" – Ólafur Arnalds featuring Bonobo
  - Ólafur Arnalds and Simon Green, producers; Ólafur Arnalds, mixer
- "Before" – James Blake
  - James Blake and Dom Maker, producers; James Blake, mixer
- "Heartbreak" – Bonobo and Totally Enormous Extinct Dinosaurs
  - Simon Green and Orlando Higginbottom, producers; Simon Green and Orlando Higginbottom, mixers
- "You Can Do It" – Caribou
  - Dan Snaith, producer; David Wrench, mixer
- "The Business" – Tiësto
  - Hightower, Julia Karlsson and Tiësto, producers; Tiësto, mixer

Best Dance/Electronic Album

- **Subconsciously – Black Coffee**
- Fallen Embers – Illenium
- Music Is the Weapon (Reloaded) – Major Lazer
- Shockwave – Marshmello
- Free Love – Sylvan Esso
- Judgement – Ten City

=== Contemporary Instrumental music ===
Best Contemporary Instrumental Album

- **Tree Falls – Taylor Eigsti**
- Double Dealin – Randy Brecker and Eric Marienthal
- The Garden – Rachel Eckroth
- At Blue Note Tokyo – Steve Gadd Band
- Deep: The Baritone Sessions, Vol. 2 – Mark Lettieri

=== Rock ===
Best Rock Performance

- **"Making a Fire" – Foo Fighters**
- "Shot in the Dark" – AC/DC
- "Know You Better" (Live from Capitol Studio A) – Black Pumas
- "Nothing Compares 2 U" – Chris Cornell
- "Ohms" – Deftones

Best Metal Performance

- **"The Alien" – Dream Theater**
- "Genesis" – Deftones
- "Amazonia" – Gojira
- "Pushing the Tides" – Mastodon
- "The Triumph of King Freak (A Crypt of Preservation and Superstition)" – Rob Zombie

Best Rock Song

- **"Waiting on a War"**
  - **Dave Grohl, Taylor Hawkins, Rami Jaffee, Nate Mendel, Chris Shiflett and Pat Smear, songwriters (Foo Fighters)**
- "All My Favorite Songs"
  - Rivers Cuomo, Ashley Gorley, Ben Johnson and Ilsey Juber, songwriters (Weezer)
- "The Bandit"
  - Caleb Followill, Jared Followill, Matthew Followill and Nathan Followill, songwriters (Kings Of Leon)
- "Distance"
  - Wolfgang Van Halen, songwriter (Mammoth WVH)
- "Find My Way"
  - Paul McCartney, songwriter (Paul McCartney)

Best Rock Album

- **Medicine at Midnight – Foo Fighters**
- Power Up – AC/DC
- Capitol Cuts - Live from Studio A – Black Pumas
- No One Sings Like You Anymore, Vol. 1 – Chris Cornell
- McCartney III – Paul McCartney

=== Alternative ===
Best Alternative Music Album

- **Daddy's Home – St. Vincent**
- Shore – Fleet Foxes
- If I Can't Have Love, I Want Power – Halsey
- Jubilee – Japanese Breakfast
- Collapsed in Sunbeams – Arlo Parks

=== R&B ===
Best R&B Performance

- **"Leave the Door Open" – Silk Sonic (TIE)**
- **"Pick Up Your Feelings" – Jazmine Sullivan (TIE)**
- "Lost You" – Snoh Aalegra
- "Peaches" – Justin Bieber featuring Daniel Caesar and Giveon
- "Damage" – H.E.R.

Best Traditional R&B Performance

- **"Fight for You" – H.E.R.**
- "I Need You" – Jon Batiste
- "Bring It On Home to Me" – BJ the Chicago Kid, PJ Morton and Kenyon Dixon featuring Charlie Bereal
- "Born Again" – Leon Bridges featuring Robert Glasper
- "How Much Can a Heart Take" – Lucky Daye featuring Yebba

Best R&B Song

- **"Leave the Door Open"**
  - **Brandon Anderson, Christopher Brody Brown, Dernst Emile II and Bruno Mars, songwriters (Silk Sonic)**
- "Damage"
  - Anthony Clemons Jr., Jeff Gitelman, H.E.R., Carl McCormick and Tiara Thomas, songwriters (H.E.R.)
- "Good Days"
  - Jacob Collier, Carter Lang, Carlos Munoz, Solána Rowe and Christopher Ruelas, songwriters (SZA)
- "Heartbreak Anniversary"
  - Giveon Evans, Maneesh, Sevn Thomas and Varren Wade, songwriters (Giveon)
- "Pick Up Your Feelings"
  - Denisia "Blue June" Andrews, Audra Mae Butts, Kyle Coleman, Brittany "Chi" Coney, Michael Holmes and Jazmine Sullivan, songwriters (Jazmine Sullivan)

Best Progressive R&B Album

- **Table for Two – Lucky Daye**
- New Light – Eric Bellinger
- Something To Say – Cory Henry
- Mood Valiant – Hiatus Kaiyote
- Dinner Party: Dessert – Terrace Martin, Robert Glasper, 9th Wonder and Kamasi Washington
- Studying Abroad: Extended Stay – Masego

Best R&B Album

- **Heaux Tales – Jazmine Sullivan**
- Temporary Highs in the Violet Skies – Snoh Aalegra
- We Are – Jon Batiste
- Gold-Diggers Sound – Leon Bridges
- Back of My Mind – H.E.R.

=== Rap ===
Best Rap Performance

- **"Family Ties" – Baby Keem featuring Kendrick Lamar**
- "Up" – Cardi B
- "My Life" – J. Cole featuring 21 Savage and Morray
- "Thot Shit" – Megan Thee Stallion

Best Melodic Rap Performance

- **"Hurricane" – Kanye West featuring the Weeknd and Lil Baby**
- "Pride Is the Devil" – J. Cole featuring Lil Baby
- "Need to Know" – Doja Cat
- "Industry Baby" – Lil Nas X featuring Jack Harlow
- "WusYaName" – Tyler, the Creator featuring Youngboy Never Broke Again and Ty Dolla Sign

Best Rap Song

- **"Jail"**
  - **Dwayne Abernathy, Jr., Shawn Carter, Raul Cubina, Michael Dean, Charles M. Njapa, Sean Solymar, Kanye West and Mark Williams, songwriters (Kanye West featuring Jay-Z)**
- "Bath Salts"
  - Shawn Carter, Kasseem Dean, Michael Forno, Nasir Jones and Earl Simmons, songwriters (DMX featuring Jay-Z and Nas)
- "Best Friend"
  - Amala Zandile Dlamini, Lukasz Gottwald, Randall Avery Hammers, Diamonté Harper, Asia Smith, Theron Thomas and Rocco Valdes, songwriters (Saweetie featuring Doja Cat)
- "Family Ties"
  - Roshwita Larisha Bacha, Hykeem Carter, Tobias Dekker, Colin Franken, Jasper Harris, Kendrick Lamar, Ronald Latour and Dominik Patrzek, songwriters (Baby Keem featuring Kendrick Lamar)
- "My Life"
  - Shéyaa Bin Abraham-Joseph and Jermaine Cole, songwriters (J. Cole featuring 21 Savage and Morray)

Best Rap Album

- **Call Me If You Get Lost – Tyler, the Creator**
- The Off-Season – J. Cole
- King's Disease II – Nas
- Donda – Kanye West

=== Country ===
Best Country Solo Performance

- **"You Should Probably Leave" – Chris Stapleton**
- "Forever After All" – Luke Combs
- "Remember Her Name" – Mickey Guyton
- "All I Do Is Drive" – Jason Isbell
- "Camera Roll" – Kacey Musgraves

Best Country Duo/Group Performance

- **"Younger Me" – Brothers Osborne**
- "If I Didn't Love You" – Jason Aldean and Carrie Underwood
- "Glad You Exist" – Dan + Shay
- "Chasing After You" – Ryan Hurd and Maren Morris
- "Drunk (And I Don't Wanna Go Home)" – Elle King and Miranda Lambert

Best Country Song

- **"Cold"**
  - **Dave Cobb, J.T. Cure, Derek Mixon and Chris Stapleton, songwriters (Chris Stapleton)**
- "Better Than We Found It"
  - Jessie Jo Dillon, Maren Morris, Jimmy Robbins and Laura Veltz, songwriters (Maren Morris)
- "Camera Roll"
  - Ian Fitchuk, Kacey Musgraves and Daniel Tashian, songwriters (Kacey Musgraves)
- "Country Again"
  - Zach Crowell, Ashley Gorley and Thomas Rhett, songwriters (Thomas Rhett)
- "Fancy Like"
  - Cameron Bartolini, Walker Hayes, Josh Jenkins and Shane Stevens, songwriters (Walker Hayes)
- "Remember Her Name"
  - Mickey Guyton, Blake Hubbard, Jarrod Ingram and Parker Welling, songwriters (Mickey Guyton)

Best Country Album

- **Starting Over – Chris Stapleton**
- Skeletons – Brothers Osborne
- Remember Her Name – Mickey Guyton
- The Marfa Tapes – Miranda Lambert, Jon Randall and Jack Ingram
- The Ballad of Dood and Juanita – Sturgill Simpson

=== New Age ===
Best New Age Album

- **Divine Tides – Stewart Copeland and Ricky Kej**
- Brothers – Will Ackerman, Jeff Oster and Tom Eaton
- Pangaea – Wouter Kellerman and David Arkenstone
- Night + Day – Opium Moon
- Pieces of Forever – Laura Sullivan

=== Jazz ===
Best Improvised Jazz Solo

- **"Humpty Dumpty (Set 2)" – Chick Corea**
- "Sackodougou" – Christian Scott aTunde Adjuah
- "Kick Those Feet" – Kenny Barron
- "Bigger Than Us" – Jon Batiste
- "Absence" – Terence Blanchard

Best Jazz Vocal Album

- **Songwrights Apothecary Lab – Esperanza Spalding**
- Generations – The Baylor Project
- SuperBlue – Kurt Elling and Charlie Hunter
- Time Traveler – Nnenna Freelon
- Flor – Gretchen Parlato

Best Jazz Instrumental Album

- **Skyline – Ron Carter, Jack DeJohnette and Gonzalo Rubalcaba**
- Jazz Selections: Music from and Inspired by Soul – Jon Batiste
- Absence – Terence Blanchard featuring the E Collective and the Turtle Island Quartet
- Akoustic Band Live – Chick Corea, John Patitucci and Dave Weckl
- Side-Eye NYC (V1.IV) – Pat Metheny

Best Large Jazz Ensemble Album

- **For Jimmy, Wes and Oliver – Christian McBride Big Band**
- Live at Birdland! – The Count Basie Orchestra directed by Scotty Barnhart
- Dear Love – Jazzmeia Horn and her Noble Force
- Swirling – Sun Ra Arkestra
- Jackets XL – Yellowjackets + WDR Big Band

Best Latin Jazz Album

- **Mirror Mirror – Eliane Elias with Chick Corea and Chucho Valdés**
- The South Bronx Story – Carlos Henriquez
- Virtual Birdland – Arturo O'Farrill and the Afro Latin Jazz Orchestra
- Transparency – Dafnis Prieto Sextet
- El Arte del Bolero – Miguel Zenón and Luis Perdomo

=== Gospel/Contemporary Christian music ===
Best Gospel Performance/Song

- **"Never Lost" – CeCe Winans**
  - **Chris Brown, Steven Furtick and Tiffany Hammer, songwriters**
- "Voice of God" – Dante Bowe featuring Steffany Gretzinger and Chandler Moore
  - Dante Bowe, Tywan Mack, Jeff Schneeweis and Mitch Wong, songwriters
- "Joyful" – Dante Bowe
  - Dante Bowe and Ben Schofield, songwriters
- "Help" – Anthony Brown & Group Therapy
  - Anthony Brown and Darryl Woodson, songwriters
- "Wait on You" – Elevation Worship and Maverick City Music
  - Dante Bowe, Chris Brown, Steven Furtick, Tiffany Hudson, Brandon Lake and Chandler Moore, songwriters

Best Contemporary Christian Music Performance/Song

- **"Believe for It" – CeCe Winans**
  - **Dwan Hill, Kyle Lee, CeCe Winans and Mitch Wong, songwriters**
- "We Win" – Kirk Franklin and Lil Baby
  - Kirk Franklin, Dominique Jones, Cynthia Nunn and Justin Smith, songwriters
- "Hold Us Together" (Hope Mix) – H.E.R. and Tauren Wells
  - Josiah Bassey, Dernst Emile and H.E.R., songwriters
- "Man of Your Word" – Chandler Moore and KJ Scriven
  - Jonathan Jay, Nathan Jess and Chandler Moore, songwriters
- "Jireh" – Elevation Worship and Maverick City Music featuring Chandler Moore and Naomi Raine
  - Chris Brown, Steven Furtick, Chandler Moore and Naomi Raine, songwriters

Best Gospel Album

- **Believe for It – CeCe Winans**
- Changing Your Story – Jekalyn Carr
- Royalty: Live at the Ryman – Tasha Cobbs Leonard
- Jubilee: Juneteenth Edition – Maverick City Music
- Jonny X Mali: Live in LA – Jonathan McReynolds and Mali Music

Best Contemporary Christian Music Album

- **Old Church Basement – Elevation Worship and Maverick City Music**
- No Stranger – Natalie Grant
- Feels Like Home Vol. 2 – Israel and New Breed
- The Blessing (Live) – Kari Jobe
- Citizen of Heaven (Live) – Tauren Wells

Best Roots Gospel Album

- **My Savior – Carrie Underwood**
- Alone with My Faith – Harry Connick Jr.
- That's Gospel, Brother – Gaither Vocal Band
- Keeping On – Ernie Haase & Signature Sound
- Songs for the Times – The Isaacs

=== Latin ===
Best Latin Pop Album

- **Mendó – Alex Cuba**
- Vértigo – Pablo Alborán
- Mis Amores – Paula Arenas
- Hecho a la Antigua – Ricardo Arjona
- Mis Manos – Camilo
- Revelación – Selena Gomez

Best Música Urbana Album

- **El Último Tour Del Mundo – Bad Bunny**
- Afrodisíaco – Rauw Alejandro
- Jose – J Balvin
- KG0516 – Karol G
- Sin Miedo (del Amor y Otros Demonios) – Kali Uchis

Best Latin Rock or Alternative Album

- **Origen – Juanes**
- Deja – Bomba Estéreo
- Mira Lo Que Me Hiciste Hacer (Deluxe Edition) – Diamante Eléctrico
- Calambre – Nathy Peluso
- El Madrileño – C. Tangana
- Sonidos de Karmática Resonancia – Zoé

Best Regional Mexican Music Album (Including Tejano)

- **A Mis 80's – Vicente Fernández**
- Antología de la Musica Ranchera, Vol. 2 – Aida Cuevas
- Seis – Mon Laferte
- Un Canto por México, Vol. 2 – Natalia Lafourcade
- AYAYAY! (Súper Deluxe) – Christian Nodal

Best Tropical Latin Album

- **SALSWING! – Rubén Blades and Roberto Delgado & Orquesta**
- En Cuarentena – El Gran Combo de Puerto Rico
- Sin Salsa No Hay Paraíso – Aymée Nuviola
- Colegas – Gilberto Santa Rosa
- Live in Peru – Tony Succar

=== American Roots ===
Best American Roots Performance

- **"Cry" – Jon Batiste**
- "Love and Regret" – Billy Strings
- "I Wish I Knew How It Would Feel to Be Free" – The Blind Boys Of Alabama and Béla Fleck
- "Same Devil" – Brandy Clark featuring Brandi Carlile
- "Nightflyer" – Allison Russell

Best American Roots Song

- **"Cry"**
  - **Jon Batiste and Steve McEwan, songwriters (Jon Batiste)**
- "Avalon"
  - Rhiannon Giddens, Justin Robinson and Francesco Turrisi, songwriters (Rhiannon Giddens with Francesco Turrisi)
- "Bored"
  - Linda Chorney, songwriter (Linda Chorney)
- "Call Me a Fool"
  - Valerie June, songwriter (Valerie June featuring Carla Thomas)
- "Diamond Studded Shoes"
  - Dan Auerbach, Natalie Hemby, Aaron Lee Tasjan and Yola, songwriters (Yola)
- "Nightflyer"
  - Jeremy Lindsay and Allison Russell, songwriters (Allison Russell)

Best Americana Album

- **Native Sons – Los Lobos**
- Downhill from Everywhere – Jackson Browne
- Leftover Feelings – John Hiatt with the Jerry Douglas Band
- Outside Child – Allison Russell
- Stand for Myself – Yola

Best Bluegrass Album

- **My Bluegrass Heart – Béla Fleck**
- Renewal – Billy Strings
- A Tribute to Bill Monroe – The Infamous Stringdusters
- Cuttin' Grass, Vol. 1: The Butcher Shoppe Sessions – Sturgill Simpson
- Music Is What I See – Rhonda Vincent

Best Traditional Blues Album

- **I Be Trying – Cedric Burnside**
- 100 Years of Blues – Elvin Bishop and Charlie Musselwhite
- Traveler's Blues – Blues Traveler
- Be Ready When I Call You – Guy Davis
- Take Me Back – Kim Wilson

Best Contemporary Blues Album

- **662 – Christone "Kingfish" Ingram**
- Delta Kream – The Black Keys featuring Eric Deaton and Kenny Brown
- Royal Tea – Joe Bonamassa
- Uncivil War – Shemekia Copeland
- Fire It Up – Steve Cropper

Best Folk Album

- **They're Calling Me Home – Rhiannon Giddens with Francesco Turrisi**
- One Night Lonely (Live) – Mary Chapin Carpenter
- Long Violent History – Tyler Childers
- Wednesday (Extended Edition) – Madison Cunningham
- Blue Heron Suite – Sarah Jarosz

Best Regional Roots Music Album

- **Kau Ka Pe'a – Kalani Pe'a**
- Live in New Orleans! – Sean Ardoin and Kreole Rock and Soul
- Bloodstains & Teardrops – Big Chief Monk Boudreaux
- My People – Cha Wa
- Corey Ledet Zydeco – Corey Ledet Zydeco

=== Reggae ===
Best Reggae Album

- **Beauty in the Silence – SOJA**
- Pamoja – Etana
- Positive Vibration – Gramps Morgan
- Live N Livin – Sean Paul
- Royal – Jesse Royal
- 10 – Spice

=== Global music ===
Best Global Music Album

- **Mother Nature – Angélique Kidjo**
- Voice of Bunbon (Vol. 1) – Rocky Dawuni
- East West Players Presents: Daniel Ho & Friends Live in Concert – Daniel Ho & Friends
- Legacy + – Femi Kuti and Made Kuti
- Made in Lagos (Deluxe Edition) – Wizkid

Best Global Music Performance

- **"Mohabbat" – Arooj Aftab**
- "Do Yourself" – Angélique Kidjo and Burna Boy
- "Pà Pá Pà" – Femi Kuti
- "Blewu" – Yo-Yo Ma and Angélique Kidjo
- "Essence" – Wizkid featuring Tems

=== Children's ===
Best Children's Album

- **A Colorful World – Falu**
- Actívate – 123 Andrés
- All One Tribe – 1 Tribe Collective
- Black to the Future – Pierce Freelon
- Crayon Kids – Lucky Diaz and the Family Jam Band

=== Spoken Word ===
Best Spoken Word Album (Includes Poetry, Audio Books & Storytelling)

- **Carry On: Reflections for a New Generation from John Lewis – Don Cheadle**
- Aftermath – LeVar Burton
- Catching Dreams: Live at Fort Knox Chicago – J. Ivy
- 8:46 – Dave Chappelle and Amir Sulaiman
- A Promised Land – Barack Obama

=== Comedy ===
Best Comedy Album

- **Sincerely Louis CK – Louis C.K.**
- The Comedy Vaccine – Lavell Crawford
- Evolution – Chelsea Handler
- Thanks for Risking Your Life – Lewis Black
- The Greatest Average American – Nate Bargatze
- Zero F***s Given – Kevin Hart

=== Musical Theater ===
Best Musical Theater Album

- **The Unofficial Bridgerton Musical – Emily Bear, producer; Abigail Barlow and Emily Bear, composer and lyricist (Barlow and Bear)**
- Andrew Lloyd Webber's Cinderella – Carrie Hope Fletcher, Ivano Turco, Victoria Hamilton-Barritt and Helen George, principal soloists; Andrew Lloyd Webber, Nick Lloyd Webber and Greg Wells, producers; David Zippel and Andrew Lloyd Webber, composers/lyricists
- Burt Bacharach and Steven Sater's Some Lovers – Burt Bacharach, Michael Croiter, Ben Hartman and Steven Sater, producers; Burt Bacharach, composer; Steven Sater, lyricist (World Premier Cast)
- Girl from the North Country – Simon Hale, Conor McPherson, and Dean Sharenow, producers; Bob Dylan, composer/lyricist (Original Broadway Cast)
- Les Misérables: The Staged Concert – Michael Ball, Alfie Boe, Carrie Hope Fletcher and Matt Lucas, principal soloists; Cameron Mackintosh, Lee McCutcheon and Stephen Metcalfe, producers; Claude-Michel Schönberg, composer; Alain Boublil, John Caird, Herbert Kretzmer, Jean-Marc Natel, and Trevor Nunn, lyricists (2020 Les Misérables Staged Concert)
- Stephen Schwartz's Snapshots – Damon Daunno, Rebecca Naomi Jones, Ali Stroker, Mary Testa and Patrick Vaill, principal soloists; Daniel C. Levine, Michael J. Moritz Jr., Bryan Perri and Stephen Schwartz, producers; Stephen Schwartz, composer and lyricist (World Premier Cast)

=== Music for Visual Media ===
Best Compilation Soundtrack for Visual Media

- **The United States vs. Billie Holiday – Andra Day**
  - **Salaam Remi, compilation producer; Lynn Fainchtein, music supervisor**
- Cruella – Various artists
  - Craig Gillespie, compilation producer; Susan Jacobs, music supervisor
- Dear Evan Hansen – Various artists
  - Alex Lacamoire, Benj Pasek, Justin Paul and Dan Romer, compilation producers; Jordan Carroll, music supervisor
- In the Heights – Various artists
  - Alex Lacamoire, Lin-Manuel Miranda, Bill Sherman and Greg Wells, compilation producers; Steven Gizicki, music supervisor
- One Night in Miami... – Leslie Odom, Jr. and various artists
  - Nicholai Baxter, compilation producer; Randall Poster, music supervisor
- Respect – Jennifer Hudson
  - Stephen Bray and Jason Michael Webb, compilation producers
- Schmigadoon! Episode 1 – Various artists
  - Doug Besterman, Cinco Paul and Scott M. Riesett, compilation producers

Best Score Soundtrack for Visual Media

- **The Queen's Gambit – Carlos Rafael Rivera, composer (TIE)**
- **Soul – Jon Batiste, Trent Reznor and Atticus Ross, composers (TIE)**
- Bridgerton – Kris Bowers, composer
- Dune – Hans Zimmer, composer
- The Mandalorian: Season 2 – Vol. 2 (Chapters 13–16) – Ludwig Göransson, composer

Best Song Written for Visual Media

- **"All Eyes on Me" (from Bo Burnham: Inside)**
  - **Bo Burnham (Bo Burnham)**
- "Agatha All Along" (from WandaVision)
  - Kristen Anderson-Lopez and Robert Lopez (Kristen Anderson-Lopez and Robert Lopez Featuring Kathryn Hahn, Eric Bradley, Greg Whipple, Jasper Randall and Gerald White)
- "All I Know So Far" (from Pink: All I Know So Far)
  - Alecia Moore, Benj Pasek and Justin Paul (Pink)
- "Fight For You" (from Judas and the Black Messiah)
  - Dernst Emile II, H.E.R. and Tiara Thomas (H.E.R.)
- "Here I Am (Singing My Way Home)" (from Respect)
  - Jamie Hartman, Jennifer Hudson and Carole King (Jennifer Hudson)
- "Speak Now" (from One Night in Miami...)
  - Sam Ashworth and Leslie Odom, Jr. (Leslie Odom, Jr.)

=== Composing/Arranging ===
Best Instrumental Composition

- **"Eberhard"**
  - **Lyle Mays, composer (Lyle Mays)**
- "Beautiful Is Black"
  - Brandee Younger, composer (Brandee Younger)
- "Cat and Mouse"
  - Tom Nazziola, composer (Tom Nazziola)
- "Concerto for Orchestra: Finale"
  - Vince Mendoza, composer (Vince Mendoza and Czech National Symphony Orchestra featuring Antonio Sánchez and Derrick Hodge)
- "Dreaming in Lions: Dreaming in Lions"
  - Arturo O’Farrill, composer (Arturo O'Farrill and the Afro Latin Jazz Ensemble)

Best Arrangement, Instrumental or A Cappella

- **"Meta Knight's Revenge (From Kirby Super Star)"**
  - **Charlie Rosen and Jake Silverman, arrangers (The 8-Bit Big Band featuring Button Masher)**
- "Chopsticks"
  - Bill O'Connell, arranger (Richard Baratta)
- "For the Love of a Princess (From Braveheart)
  - Robin Smith, arranger (Hauser, London Symphony Orchestra and Robin Smith)
- "Infinite Love"
  - Emile Mosseri, arranger (Emile Mosseri)
- "The Struggle Within"
  - Gabriela Quintero and Rodrigo Sanchez, arrangers (Rodrigo y Gabriela)

Best Arrangement, Instruments and Vocals

- **"To The Edge of Longing (Edit Version)"**
  - **Vince Mendoza, arranger (Vince Mendoza, Czech National Symphony Orchestra and Julia Bullock)**
- "The Bottom Line"
  - Ólafur Arnalds, arranger (Ólafur Arnalds and Josin)
- "A Change is Gonna Come"
  - Tehillah Alphonso, arranger (Tonality and Alexander Lloyd Blake)
- "The Christmas Song (Chestnuts Roasting on an Open Fire)"
  - Jacob Collier, arranger (Jacob Collier)
- "Eleanor Rigby"
  - Cody Fry, arranger (Cody Fry)

=== Package, Notes & Historical ===
Best Recording Package

- **Pakelang**
  - **Li Jheng Han and Yu Wei, art directors (2nd Generation Falangao Singing Group and the Chairman Crossover Big Band)**
- American Jackpot / American Girls
  - Sarah Dodds and Shauna Dodds, art directors (Reckless Kelly)
- Carnage
  - Nick Cave and Tom Hingston, art directors (Nick Cave and Warren Ellis)
- Serpentine Prison
  - Dayle Doyle, art director (Matt Berninger)
- Zeta
  - Xiao Qing Yang, art director (Soul of Ears)

Best Boxed or Special Limited Edition Package

- **All Things Must Pass: 50th Anniversary Edition**
  - **Darren Evans, Dhani Harrison and Olivia Harrison, art directors (George Harrison)**
- Color Theory
  - Lordess Foudre and Christopher Leckie, art directors (Soccer Mommy)
- The Future Bites (Limited Edition Box Set)
  - Simon Moore and Steven Wilson, art directors (Steven Wilson)
- 77-81
  - Dan Calderwood and Jon King, art directors (Gang of Four)
- Swimming in Circles
  - Ramón Coronado and Marshall Rake, art directors (Mac Miller)

Best Album Notes

- **The Complete Louis Armstrong Columbia and RCA Victor Studio Sessions 1946-1966**
  - **Ricky Riccardi, album notes writer (Louis Armstrong)**
- Beethoven: The Last Three Sonatas
  - Ann-Katrin Zimmermann, album notes writer (Sunwook Kim)
- Creation Never Sleeps, Creation Never Dies: The Willie Dunn Anthology
  - Kevin Howes, album notes writer (Willie Dunn)
- Etching The Voice: Emile Berliner and the First Commercial Gramophone Discs, 1889-1895
  - David Giovannoni, Richard Martin and Stephan Puille, album notes writers (Various Artists)
- The King of Gospel Music: The Life and Music of Reverend James Cleveland
  - Robert Marovich, album notes writer (Various Artists)

Best Historical Album

- **Joni Mitchell Archives – Vol. 1: The Early Years (1963–1967)**
  - **Patrick Milligan and Joni Mitchell, compilation producers; Bernie Grundman, mastering engineer (Joni Mitchell)**
- Beyond The Music: Her Complete RCA Victor Recordings
  - Robert Russ, compilation producer; Nancy Conforti, Andreas K. Meyer and Jennifer Nulsen, mastering engineers (Marian Anderson)
- Etching The Voice: Emile Berliner and the First Commercial Gramophone Discs, 1889-1895
  - Meagan Hennessey and Richard Martin, compilation producers; Richard Martin, mastering engineer (Various Artists)
- Excavated Shellac: An Alternate History of the World's Music
  - April Ledbetter, Steven Lance Ledbetter and Jonathan Ward, compilation producers; Michael Graves, mastering engineer (Various Artists)
- Sign O' The Times (Super Deluxe Edition)
  - Trevor Guy, Michael Howe and Kirk Johnson, compilation producers; Bernie Grundman, mastering engineer (Prince)

=== Production ===
Best Engineered Album, Non-Classical

- **Love for Sale**
  - **Dae Bennett, Josh Coleman and Billy Cumella, engineers; Greg Calbi and Steve Fallone, mastering engineers (Tony Bennett and Lady Gaga)**
- Cinema
  - Josh Conway, Marvin Figueroa, Josh Gudwin, Neal H Pogue and Ethan Shumaker, engineers; Joe LaPorta, mastering engineer (The Marías)
- Dawn
  - Thomas Brenneck, Zach Brown, Elton "L10MixedIt" Chueng, Riccardo Damian, Tom Elmhirst, Jens Jungkurth, Todd Monfalcone, John Rooney and Smino, engineers; Randy Merrill, mastering engineer (Yebba)
- Hey What
  - BJ Burton, engineer; BJ Burton, mastering engineer (Low)
- Notes with Attachments
  - Joseph Lorge and Blake Mills, engineers; Greg Koller, mastering engineer (Pino Palladino and Blake Mills)

Producer of the Year, Non-Classical

- **Jack Antonoff**
  - **Chemtrails Over the Country Club (Lana Del Rey) (A)**
  - **Daddy's Home (St. Vincent) (A)**
  - **"Gold Rush" (Taylor Swift) (T)**
  - **Sling (Clairo) (A)**
  - **Solar Power (Lorde) (A)**
  - **Take the Sadness Out of Saturday Night (Bleachers) (A)**
- Rogét Chahayed
  - "//Aguardiente y Limón %ᵕ‿‿ᵕ%" (Kali Uchis) (T)
  - "Ain't S***" (Doja Cat) (T)
  - "Beautiful" (Shelley FKA DRAM) (T)
  - "Blueberry Eyes" (Max featuring Suga of BTS) (S)
  - "Fire in the Sky" (Anderson .Paak) (T)
  - "Kiss Me More" (Doja Cat featuring SZA) (S)
  - "Lazy Susan" (21 Savage with Rich Brian featuring Warren Hue and MaSimWei) (S)
  - "Nitrous" (Joji) (T)
  - "Vibez" (Zayn) (S)
- Mike Elizondo
  - Glow On (Turnstile) (A)
  - "Good Day" (Twenty One Pilots) (T)
  - Life by Misadventure (Rag'n'Bone Man) (A)
  - "Mercy" (Jonas Brothers) (T)
  - "Mulberry Street" (Twenty One Pilots) (T)
  - Obviously (Lake Street Dive) (A)
  - "Repeat" (Grace Vanderwaal) (S)
  - "Taking The Heat" (Joy Oladokun) (T)
- Hit-Boy
  - Judas and the Black Messiah: The Inspired Album (Various Artists) (A)
  - King's Disease II (Nas) (A)
- Ricky Reed
  - "//aguardiente y limón%ᵕ‿‿ᵕ%" (Kali Uchis) (T)
  - "Can't Let You Go" (Terrace Martin featuring Nick Grant) (S)
  - "Damn Bean" (John-Robert) (T)
  - "Don't Go Yet" (Camila Cabello) (S)
  - Gold-Diggers Sound (Leon Bridges) (A)
  - "Piece of You" (Shawn Mendes) (T)
  - "Pushing Away" (Junior Mesa) (T)
  - "Rumors" (Lizzo featuring Cardi B) (S)
  - "Sing" (Jon Batiste) (T)

Best Remixed Recording, Non-Classical

- **"Passenger" (Mike Shinoda remix)**
  - **Mike Shinoda, remixer (Deftones)**
- "Back to Life" (Booker T Kings of Soul satta dub)
  - Booker T., remixer (Soul II Soul)
- "Born for Greatness" (Cymek remix)
  - Spencer Bastin, remixer (Papa Roach)
- "Constant Craving" (Fashionably Late remix)
  - Tracy Young, remixer (k.d. lang)
- "Inside Out" (3scape Drm remix)
  - 3scape Drm, remixer (Zedd and Griff)
- "Met Him Last Night" (Dave Audé remix)
  - Dave Audé, remixer (Demi Lovato featuring Ariana Grande)
- "Talks" (Mura Masa Remix)
  - Alexander Crossan, remixer (PVA)

Best Immersive Audio Album

- **Alicia**
  - **George Massenburg and Eric Schilling, immersive mix engineers; Michael Romanowski, immersive mastering engineer; Ann Mincieli, immersive producer (Alicia Keys)**
- Clique
  - Jim Anderson and Ulrike Schwarz, immersive mix engineers; Bob Ludwig, immersive mastering engineer; Jim Anderson, immersive producer (Patricia Barber)
- Fine Line
  - Greg Penny, immersive mix engineer; Greg Penny, immersive mastering engineer; Greg Penny, immersive producer (Harry Styles)
- The Future Bites
  - Jake Fields and Steven Wilson, immersive mix engineers; Bob Ludwig, immersive mastering engineer; Steven Wilson, immersive producer (Steven Wilson)
- Stille Grender
  - Morten Lindberg, immersive mix engineer; Morten Lindberg, immersive mastering engineer; Morten Lindberg, immersive producer (Anne Karin Sundal-Ask & Det Norske Jentekor)

Best Engineered Album, Classical

- **Chanticleer Sings Christmas**
  - **Leslie Ann Jones, engineer (Chanticleer)**
- Archetypes
  - Jonathan Lackey, Bill Maylone and Dan Nichols, engineers; Bill Maylone, mastering engineer (Sérgio Assad, Clarice Assad and Third Coast Percussion)
- Beethoven: Cello Sonatas - Hope Amid Tears
  - Richard King, engineer (Yo-Yo Ma and Emanuel Ax)
- Beethoven: Symphony No. 9
  - Mark Donahue, engineer; Mark Donahue, mastering engineer (Manfred Honeck, Mendelssohn Choir of Pittsburgh and Pittsburgh Symphony Orchestra)
- Mahler: Symphony No. 8, 'Symphony of a Thousand'
  - Alexander Lipay and Dmitriy Lipay, engineers; Alexander Lipay and Dmitriy Lipay, mastering engineers (Gustavo Dudamel, Fernando Malvar-Ruiz, Luke McEndarfer, Robert Istad, Grant Gershon, Los Angeles Children's Chorus, Los Angeles Master Chorale, National Children's Chorus, Pacific Chorale and Los Angeles Philharmonic)

Producer of the Year, Classical

- **Judith Sherman**
  - **Alone Together (Jennifer Koh) (A)**
  - **Bach & Beyond Part 3 (Jennifer Koh) (A)**
  - **Bruits (Imani Winds) (A)**
  - **Eryilmaz: Dances of the Yogurt Maker (Erberk Eryilmaz and Carpe Diem String Quartet) (A)**
  - **Fantasy - Oppens Plays Kaminsky (Ursula Oppens) (A)**
  - **Home (Blythe Gaissert) (A)**
  - **Mendelssohn, Visconti and Golijov (Jasper String Quartet and Jupiter String Quartet) (A)**
  - **A Schubert Journey (Llŷr Williams) (A)**
  - **Vers Le Silence - William Bolcom & Frédéric Chopin (Ran Dank) (A)**
- Blanton Alspaugh
  - Appear And Inspire (James Franklin and the East Carolina University Chamber Singers) (A)
  - Howells: Requiem (Brian Schmidt and Baylor University A Cappella Choir) (A)
  - Hymns of Kassianí (Alexander Lingas and Cappella Romana) (A)
  - Kyr: In Praise of Music (Joshua Copeland and Antioch Chamber Ensemble) (A)
  - More Honourable Than the Cherubim (Vladimir Gorbik and PaTRAM Institute Male Choir) (A)
  - O'Regan: The Phoenix (Patrick Summers, Thomas Hampson, Chad Shelton, Rihab Chaieb, Lauren Snouffer, Houston Grand Opera and Houston Grand Opera Orchestra) (A)
  - Sheehan: Liturgy Of Saint John Chrysostom (Benedict Sheeha and the Saint Tikhon Choir) (A)
- Steven Epstein
  - Bach And Brahms Re-Imagined (Jens Lindemann, James Ehnes and Jon Kimura Parker) (A)
  - Bartók: Quartet No. 3; Beethoven: Op. 59, No. 2; Dvořák: American Quartet (Juilliard String Quartet) (A)
  - Beethoven: Cello Sonatas - Hope Amid Tears (Yo-Yo Ma and Emanuel Ax) (A)
  - Mozart: Piano Concertos Nos. 9 and 17, Arr. For Piano, String Quartet And Double Bass (Alon Goldstein, Alexander Bickard and Fine Arts Quartet) (A)
  - Songs of Comfort and Hope (Yo-Yo Ma and Kathryn Stott) (A)
- David Frost
  - Chamber Works By Dmitri Klebanov (ARC Ensemble) (A)
  - Glass: Akhnaten (Karen Kamensek, J'Nai Bridges, Dísella Lárusdóttir, Zachary James, Anthony Roth Costanzo, Metropolitan Opera Chorus and Orchestra) (A)
  - Mon Ami, Mon Amour (Matt Haimovitz and Mari Kodama) (A)
  - One Movement Symphonies - Barber, Sibelius, Scriabin (Michael Stern and Kansas City Symphony) (A)
  - Poulenc: Dialogues Des Carmélites (Yannick Nézet-Séguin, Isabel Leonard, Erin Morley, Adrianne Pieczonka, Karita Mattila, Karen Cargill, Metropolitan Opera Chorus and Orchestra) (A)
  - Primavera I - The Wind (Matt Haimovitz) (A)
  - Roots (Randall Goosby and Zhu Wang) (A)
- Elaine Martone
  - Archetypes (Sérgio Assad, Clarice Assad and Third Coast Percussion) (A)
  - Beneath the Sky (Zoe Allen and Levi Hernandez) (A)
  - Davis: Family Secrets - Kith & Kin (Timothy Myers, Andrea Edith Moore and Jane Holding) (A)
  - Quest (Elisabeth Remy Johnson) (A)
  - Schubert: Symphony In C Major, 'The Great'; Krenek: Static & Ecstatic (Franz Welser-Möst and the Cleveland Orchestra) (A)

=== Classical ===
Best Orchestral Performance

- **"Price: Symphonies Nos. 1 & 3"**
  - **Yannick Nézet-Séguin, conductor (Philadelphia Orchestra)**
- "Adams: My Father Knew Charles Ives; Harmonielehre"
  - Giancarlo Guerrero, conductor (Nashville Symphony Orchestra)
- "Beethoven: Symphony No. 9"
  - Manfred Honeck, conductor (Mendelssohn Choir of Pittsburgh and Pittsburgh Symphony Orchestra)
- "Muhly: Throughline"
  - Nico Muhly, conductor (San Francisco Symphony)
- "Strauss: Also Sprach Zarathustra; Scriabin: The Poem of Ecstasy"
  - Thomas Dausgaard, conductor (Seattle Symphony Orchestra)

Best Opera Recording

- **"Glass: Akhnaten"**
  - **Karen Kamensek, conductor; J’Nai Bridges, Anthony Roth Costanzo, Zachary James and Dísella Lárusdóttir; David Frost, producer (The Metropolitan Opera Orchestra; The Metropolitan Opera Chorus)**
- "Bartók: Bluebeard's Castle"
  - Susanna Mälkki, conductor; Mika Kares and Szilvia Vörös; Robert Suff, producer (Helsinki Philharmonic Orchestra)
- "Janáček: Cunning Little Vixen"
  - Simon Rattle, conductor; Sophia Burgos, Lucy Crowe, Gerald Finley, Peter Hoare, Anna Lapkovskaja, Paulina Malefane, Jan Martinik and Hanno Müller-Brachmann; Andrew Cornall, producer (London Symphony Orchestra; London Symphony Chorus and LSO Discovery Voices)
- "Little: Soldier Songs"
  - Corrado Rovaris, conductor; Johnathan McCullough; James Darrah and John Toia, producers (The Opera Philadelphia Orchestra)
- "Poulenc: Dialogues Des Carmélites"
  - Yannick Nézet-Séguin, conductor; Karen Cargill, Isabel Leonard, Karita Mattila, Erin Morley and Adrianne Pieczonka; David Frost, producer (The Metropolitan Opera Orchestra; The Metropolitan Opera Chorus)

Best Choral Performance

- **"Mahler: Symphony No. 8, 'Symphony Of A Thousand'"**
  - **Gustavo Dudamel, conductor; Grant Gershon, Robert Istad, Fernando Malvar-Ruiz and Luke McEndarfer, chorus masters (Leah Crocetto, Mihoko Fujimura, Ryan McKinny, Erin Morley, Tamara Mumford, Simon O'Neill, Morris Robinson and Tamara Wilson; Los Angeles Philharmonic; Los Angeles Children's Chorus, Los Angeles Master Chorale, National Children's Chorus and Pacific Chorale)**
- "It's a Long Way"
  - Matthew Guard, conductor (Jonas Budris, Carrie Cheron, Fiona Gillespie, Nathan Hodgson, Helen Karloski, Enrico Lagasca, Megan Roth, Alissa Ruth Suver and Dana Whiteside; Skylark Vocal Ensemble)
- "Rising w/The Crossing"
  - Donald Nally, conductor (International Contemporary Ensemble and Quicksilver; The Crossing)
- "Schnittke: Choir Concerto; Three Sacred Hymns; Pärt: Seven Magnificat-Antiphons"
  - Kaspars Putniņš, conductor; Heli Jürgenson, chorus master (Estonian Philharmonic Chamber Choir)
- "Sheehan: Liturgy of Saint John Chrysostom"
  - Benedict Sheehan, conductor (Michael Hawes, Timothy Parsons and Jason Thoms; The Saint Tikhon Choir)
- "The Singing Guitar"
  - Craig Hella Johnson, conductor (Estelí Gomez; Austin Guitar Quartet, Douglas Harvey, Los Angeles Guitar Quartet and Texas Guitar Quartet; Conspirare)

Best Chamber Music/Small Ensemble Performance

- **Beethoven: Cello Sonatas - Hope Amid Tears – Yo-Yo Ma and Emanuel Ax**
- Adams, John Luther: Lines Made by Walking – JACK Quartet
- Akiho: Seven Pillars – Sandbox Percussion
- Archetypes – Sérgio Assad, Clarice Assad and Third Coast Percussion
- Bruits – Imani Winds

Best Classical Instrumental Solo

- **Alone Together – Jennifer Koh**
- An American Mosaic – Simone Dinnerstein
- Bach: Sonatas & Partitas – Augustin Hadelich
- Beethoven & Brahms: Violin Concertos – Gil Shaham; Eric Jacobsen, conductor (The Knights)
- Mak Bach – Mak Grgić
- Of Power – Curtis Stewart

Best Classical Solo Vocal Album

- **Mythologies**
  - **Sangeeta Kaur, Hila Plitmann, and Danaë Xanthe Vlasse (Virginie D'Avezac De Castera, Lili Haydn, Wouter Kellerman, Nadeem Majdalany, Eru Matsumoto and Emilio D. Miler)**
- Confessions
  - Laura Strickling; Joy Schreier, pianist
- Dreams Of A New Day - Songs By Black Composers
  - Will Liverman; Paul Sánchez, pianist
- Schubert: Winterreise
  - Joyce DiDonato; Yannick Nézet-Séguin, pianist
- Unexpected Shadows
  - Jamie Barton; Jake Heggie, pianist (Matt Haimovitz)

Best Classical Compendium

- **Women Warriors - The Voices Of Change**
  - **Amy Andersson, conductor; Amy Andersson, Mark Mattson and Lolita Ritmanis, producers**
- American Originals - A New World, A New Canon
  - AGAVE and Reginald L. Mobley; Geoffrey Silver, producer
- Berg: Violin Concerto; Seven Early Songs and Three Pieces for Orchestra
  - Michael Tilson Thomas, conductor; Jack Vad, producer
- Cerrone: The Arching Path
  - Timo Andres and Ian Rosenbaum; Mike Tierney, producer
- Plays
  - Chick Corea; Chick Corea and Birnie Kirsh, producers

Best Contemporary Classical Composition

- **"Shaw: Narrow Sea"**
  - **Caroline Shaw, composer (Dawn Upshaw, Gilbert Kalish and Sō Percussion)**
- "Akiho: Seven Pillars"
  - Andy Akiho, composer (Sandbox Percussion)
- "Andriessen: The Only One"
  - Louis Andriessen, composer (Esa-Pekka Salonen, Nora Fischer and Los Angeles Philharmonic)
- "Assad, Clarice & Sérgio, Connors, Dillon, Martin & Skidmore: Archetypes"
  - Clarice Assad, Sérgio Assad, Sean Connors, Robert Dillon, Peter Martin and David Skidmore, composers (Sérgio Assad, Clarice Assad and Third Coast Percussion)
- "Batiste: Movement 11'"
  - Jon Batiste, composer (Jon Batiste)

=== Music Video/Film ===
Best Music Video

- **"Freedom" – Jon Batiste**
  - **Alan Ferguson, video director; Alex P. Willson, video producer**
- "Shot in the Dark" – AC/DC
  - David Mallet, video director; Dione Orrom, video producer
- "I Get a Kick Out of You" – Tony Bennett and Lady Gaga
  - Jennifer Lebeau, video director; Danny Bennett, Bobby Campbell and Jennifer Lebeau, video producers
- "Peaches" – Justin Bieber featuring Daniel Caesar and Giveon
  - Colin Tilley, video director; Jamee Ranta and Jack Winter, video producers
- "Happier Than Ever" – Billie Eilish
  - Billie Eilish, video director; Michelle An, Chelsea Dodson and David Moore, video producers
- "Montero (Call Me by Your Name)" – Lil Nas X
  - Lil Nas X and Tanu Muino, video directors; Frank, Ivanna Borin, Marco De Molina and Saul Levitz, video producers
- "Good 4 U" – Olivia Rodrigo
  - Petra Collins, video director; Christiana Divona, Marissa Ramirez and Tiffany Suh, video producers

Best Music Film

- **Summer of Soul – Various Artists**
  - **Ahmir "Questlove" Thompson, video director; David Dinerstein, Robert Fyvolent, and Joseph Patel, video producers**
- Bo Burnham: Inside – Bo Burnham
  - Bo Burnham, video director; Josh Senior, video producer
- David Byrne's American Utopia – David Byrne
  - Spike Lee, video director; David Byrne and Spike Lee, video producers
- Happier Than Ever: A Love Letter to Los Angeles – Billie Eilish
  - Patrick Osborne and Robert Rodriguez, video directors; Michelle An, Chelsea Dodson, Justin Lubliner and Juliet Tierney, video producers
- Music, Money, Madness... Jimi Hendrix in Maui – Jimi Hendrix
  - John McDermott, video director; Janie Hendrix, John McDermott and George Scott, video producers

== Special Merit Awards ==
=== Lifetime Achievement Award ===
- Bonnie Raitt

=== Music Educator ===
- Stephen Cox

== Multiple nominations and awards ==
The following received multiple nominations:

Eleven:

- Jon Batiste

Eight:

- Justin Bieber
- Doja Cat
- H.E.R.

Seven:

- Billie Eilish
- Olivia Rodrigo

Six:

- D'Mile
- Giveon

Five:

- Lady Gaga
- Tony Bennett
- Daniel Caesar
- Brandi Carlile
- Finneas
- Şerban Ghenea
- Lil Baby
- Lil Nas X
- Randy Merrill
- SZA
- Kanye West

Four:

- Baby Keem
- Chris Brown
- Greg Calbi
- Rogét Chahayed
- J. Cole
- Chick Corea
- Steve Fallone
- Carter Lang
- Manny Marroquin
- Maverick City Music
- Chandler Moore
- Silk Sonic
- Tiara Thomas

Three:

- AC/DC
- Yeti Beats
- Louis Bell
- Dae Bennett
- Dante Bowe
- Dave Cobb
- Josh Coleman
- Dr. Luke
- Elevation Worship
- Tom Elmhirst
- Omer Fedi
- Foo Fighters
- David Frost
- Ariana Grande
- Josh Gudwin
- Mickey Guyton
- Bernard "Harv" Harvey
- Jay-Z
- Angélique Kidjo
- Dave Kutch
- Roy Lenzo
- Colin Leonard
- Daniel Nigro
- Allison Russell
- Chris Stapleton
- Jazmine Sullivan
- Take a Daytrip
- Ty Dolla Sign
- Joe Visciano
- Andrew Watt
- The Weeknd
- CeCe Winans

Two:

- Snoh Aalegra
- Arooj Aftab
- Jack Antonoff
- Ólafur Arnalds
- Rob Bisel
- Black Pumas
- Terence Blanchard
- Benny Blanco
- Bonobo
- Mike Bozzi
- Leon Bridges
- Brothers Osborne
- Brody Brown
- Burna Boy
- Bo Burnham
- Cardiak
- Brandy Clark
- Ant Clemons
- Jacob Collier
- Chris Cornell
- Billy Cumella
- DaBaby
- Deftones
- Russ Elevado
- Jason Evigan
- Béla Fleck
- Steven Furtick
- Chris Gehringer
- Rhiannon Giddens
- Jeff Gitelman
- Robert Glasper
- Ashley Gorley
- Jack Harlow
- Kuk Harrell
- Cory Henry
- Hit-Boy
- Jennifer Hudson
- Japanese Breakfast
- Rodney "Darkchild" Jerkins
- Tori Kelly
- The Kid Laroi
- Rob Kinelski
- Felisha "Fury" King
- Kizzo
- Femi Kuti
- Kendrick Lamar
- Miranda Lambert
- Matthew Sean Leon
- Rian Lewis
- Joseph Lorge
- Lucky Daye
- Yo-Yo Ma
- Emerson Mancini
- Luis Manuel Martinez Jr.
- Mitch McCarthy
- Paul McCartney
- Steve McEwan
- Maren Morris
- PJ Morton
- Kacey Musgraves
- Nas
- Nova Wav
- Arturo O'Farrill
- Arlo Parks
- Gerard Powell II
- Ricky Reed
- Autumn Rowe
- Christopher Ruelas
- Jaclyn Sanchez
- Saweetie
- Shndo
- Aaron Simmonds
- Sturgill Simpson
- Billy Strings
- Megan Thee Stallion
- Tizhimself
- Francesco Turrisi
- 21 Savage
- Tyler, the Creator
- Carrie Underwood
- Tauren Wells
- Steven Wilson
- WizKid
- Mitch Wong
- Keavan Yazdani
- Yola
- Young Thug

The following received multiple awards:

Five:

- Jon Batiste

Four:

- Silk Sonic

Three:

- D'Mile
- Foo Fighters
- Olivia Rodrigo
- Chris Stapleton
- CeCe Winans

Two:

- Brody Brown
- Chick Corea
- Jazmine Sullivan
- Kanye West

== Ukraine tribute ==
A tribute to victims of the 2022 Russian invasion of Ukraine was featured with a performance of "Go Down Moses". Prior to the performance, a short video of Volodymyr Zelenskyy concerning the circumstances of warfare and military activity in Ukraine was played. Zelenskyy's appearance was seen by some as a way to make up for the rejection of the similar idea during the 94th Academy Awards the week before.

== In Memoriam ==
The In Memoriam segment was introduced by host Trevor Noah, with Cynthia Erivo, Ben Platt, Leslie Odom Jr., and Rachel Zegler performing multiple songs by American composer Stephen Sondheim during the segment, including "Somewhere" (from West Side Story), "Send in the Clowns" (from A Little Night Music), and "Not a Day Goes By" (from Merrily We Roll Along).

- Taylor Hawkins
- Marilyn Bergman
- Virgil Abloh
- Gary Brooker
- Walter Yetnikoff
- Sarah Dash
- Ken Kragen
- Dottie Dodgion
- Paddy Moloney
- Jim Steinman
- Biz Markie
- Marília Mendonça
- Clarence McDonald
- Rusty Young
- Connie Bradley
- Stonewall Jackson
- Roger Hawkins
- Betty Davis
- George Wein
- Johnny Ventura
- Lisa Roy
- Charlie Watts
- Wanda Young
- Meat Loaf
- Al Schlesinger
- Lee "Scratch" Perry
- Don Everly
- Robbie Shakespeare
- Michael Lang
- Ronnie Spector
- Ralph Emery
- Young Dolph
- Nanci Griffith
- Jesse D
- Mark Lanegan
- Shock G
- Vicente Fernández
- Jeremy Lubbock
- Tom Parker
- Dusty Hill
- Ethel Gabriel
- Lloyd Price
- Al Schmitt
- Ron Tutt
- Joe Simon
- Malcolm Cecil
- Jon Lind
- Greg Tate
- Elliot Mazer
- Bobbie Nelson
- B. J. Thomas
- DMX
- Dallas Frazier
- Bhaskar Menon
- Ronnie Wilson
- Marshall Gelfand
- Michael Nesmith
- James Mtume
- Tom T. Hall
- Chucky Thompson
- Stephen Sondheim
