= Tom Eaton (musician) =

American musician (born 1971)

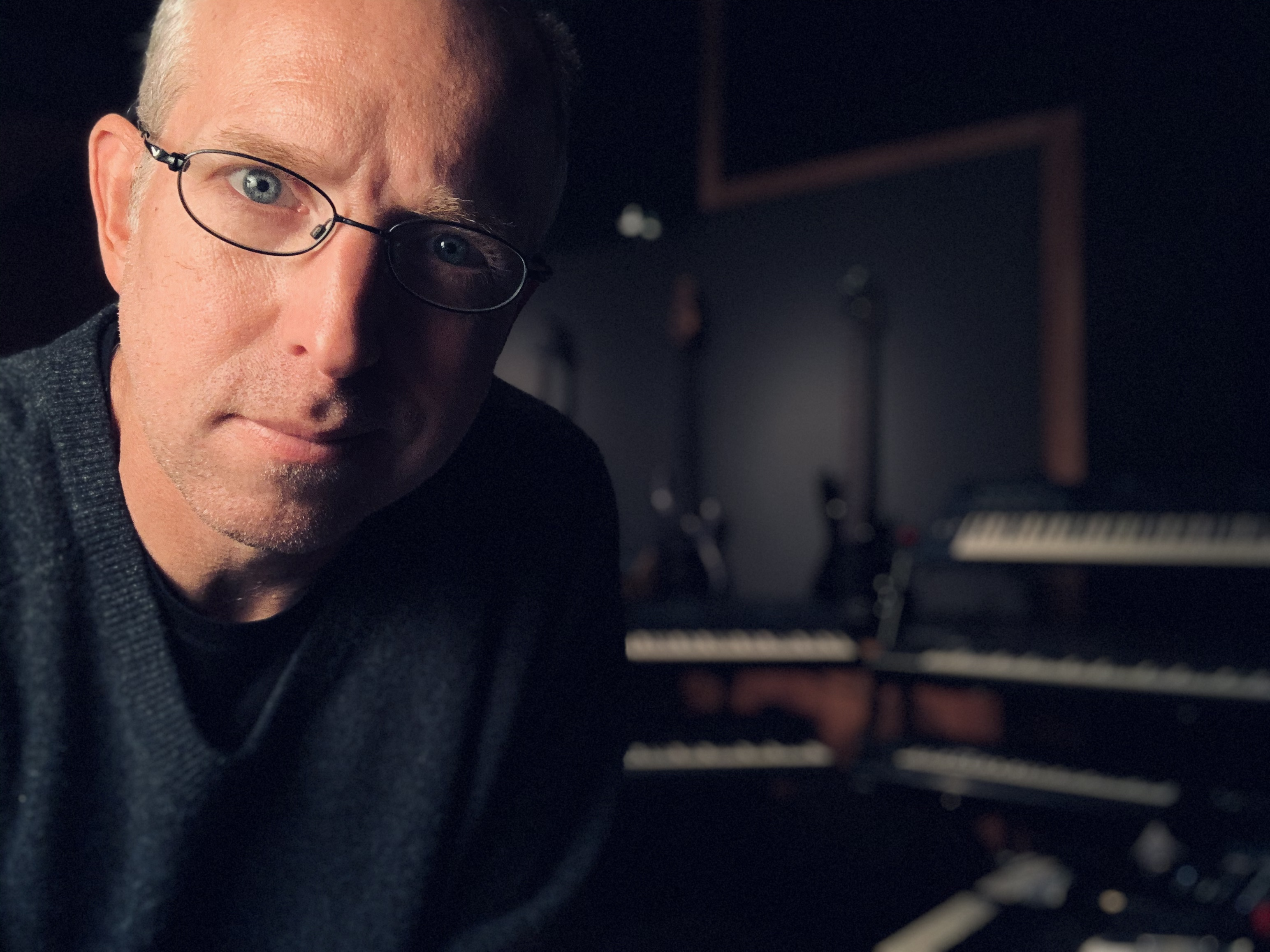

Background information
- Born: 1971 (age 54–55); Newton Junction, NH, United States
- Genres: new-age, ambient
- Occupations: Musician, composer, producer, mastering engineer
- Instruments: Piano, synthesizer, bass guitar
- Years active: 2000s–present
- Labels: Spotted Peccary Music, Riverwide Records, Heartdance Records, Retso Records, Cassauna/Important Records
- Website: www.tomeaton.net

Tom Eaton is a Grammy-nominated American multi-instrumentalist, composer, producer, and mastering engineer. He is known as the composer of multiple albums, and as a producer and engineer who works with Grammy Award-winner William Ackerman.

Since 1993, Allmusic credits Eaton 649 times on 147 albums for production roles, including being an engineer, a producer, mixing, mastering, and for performing piano, keyboards, electric bass, bass, guitar, percussion, accordion, and vocals. He was an engineer on Laura Sullivan's Grammy Award-winning album Love's River.

His influences include Tangerine Dream, Patrick O'Hearn, Vangelis, George Winston, and Tim Story.

Eaton currently resides in East Kingston, NH, where he composes and works in a converted barn.

== Early life ==
Eaton was born in 1971 in Newton Junction, NH, United States. He attended Phillips Andover co-educational university-preparatory school where he encountered their music laboratory in 1987 and started composing music. A year later he started to play piano, influenced by George Winston.

== Musical career ==
In 1993, Eaton opened his first commercial studio, Thomas Eaton Recording in Newburyport, MA In 2009, he received a phone call from William Ackerman to join him as a co-producer at Imaginary Road Studio where they have since co-produced dozens of albums together. In 2014, Ackerman produced and Eaton engineered Laura Sullivan's Grammy Award-winning album Love's River.

In 2010, he co-released Winter Loves Company with cellist Kristen Miller.

In February 2016, Eaton released his first album, abendromen on riverwide records. abendromen garnered Eaton a Zone Music Reporter award as Best New Artist. He was credited on three of the 2016 Zone Music Reporter award-winning albums, not including his own. abendromen was followed up by indesterren, released in September 2016, also on riverwide records. He also released a download only album, Days of Green and Light.

At the 2017, Zone Music Reporter Awards, Abendromen was nominated as best ambient album and he won the award for best new artist.

In 2018, Eaton began performing with Jeff Oster and guitarist Vin Downes in a group they named Departure and appeared on an Echoes streaming "living room concert." One of the songs performed in the streaming concert appears on Echoes album, Victoria Place: Echoes Live 23. He also recorded SPICA/ACIPS on Important Records as part of their limited edition Cassauna cassette catalog.

In April 2019, Eaton released how it happened on Spotted Peccary Music. It was selected by Ambient Music Guide as one of the best of 2019. He also performed in the Zone Music Reporter's 15th Annual Music Concert in New Orleans on May 18, 2019.

In April 2020, Eaton and Ackerman received the Best Instrumental Music Producer Award at the 18th Independent Music Awards for their work on FLOW's first self-titled album.

In May 2020, Eaton released elements: audio environments on riverwide records. Textura selected it as one of their Top 10 Ambient / New Age albums.

=== Brothers ===
In July 2021, Eaton, William Ackerman and Jeff Oster began to record the album Brothers. Originally, Brothers was conceived by Oster as a collaboration with Ackerman, but based on Eaton's musical contributions (as well as his recording, arranging, mixing and mastering the album), Eaton was made a "brother" and given equal billing. Recording took place at Eaton's studio in Newburyport, MA and Ackerman's Imaginary Road Studios in Vermont. Eaton performed on piano, keyboard, bass, percussion, and electric guitar, Ackerman performed on acoustic guitar, and Oster performed on flugelhorn and trumpet. The album was nominated for the Grammy Award's Best New Age Album.

== Notable collaborations ==
Artist	Album	Released	Credits	Award(s)
Will Ackerman	Positano Songs	2022	Producer, engineer, Mixing, Mastering, Piano, Bass	Grammy Award Nominee for Best New Age, Ambient, or Chant Album
Will Ackerman, Jeff Oster, Tom Eaton	Brothers	2021	Primary Artist, composer, Piano, Rhodes, Bass, Percussion, Guitar (Electric), arranger, producer, engineer, Mixing, Mastering	Grammy Award Nominee for Best New Age Album
FLOW	Promise	2019	Producer, engineer, Mastering, Accordion, Bass, Guitar (Electric), Keyboards, Percussion	2019 ZMR Album of the Year
Kathryn Kaye	Solace of Mountains And Clouds	2019	Producer, engineer, Mixing, Mastering, Accordion, Bass, Guitar (Electric)	2019 ZMR Best Piano Album with Instrumentation
Todd Mosby	Open Waters	2019	Producer, engineer, Mixing, Mastering, Fender Rhodes, Shaker, Synthesizer Pads	2019 ZMR Best Contemporary Instrumental Album
Heidi Breyer	Moonlight in Empty Rooms	2018	Producer, engineer, Mixing, Mastering	2018 ZMR Best Piano Album with Instrumentation
Jeff Oster	Reach	2018	Mastering	2018 ZMR Album of the Year, Best Contemporary Instrumental Album
David Wahler	Mosaic	2018	Mastering	2018 ZMR Best Relaxation Meditation Album
FLOW	FLOW	2017	Producer, Mixing, Mastering, Bass, Guitar	2017 ZMR Album of the Year, Best Contemporary Instrumental Album, Independent Music Awards New Age Album of the Year
Fiona Joy Hawkins	Signature – Synchronicity	2016	Producer, Mixing, Bass, Bass (Electric), Guitar (Electric), Keyboards, Percussion	Independent Music Award for Best New Age Song for "Song Calling Earth," Best New Age Album; 2016 ZMR Best Piano Album
Kathryn Kaye	There Was A Time	2016	Producer, engineer, Mixing, Mastering, Accordion	2016 ZMR Best Piano Album with Instrumentation
Jeff Pearce	Follow the River Home	2016	Mastering	2016 ZMR Best Ambient Album
Erik Scott	In the Company of Clouds	2016	Mastering	2016 ZMR Album of the Year, Best Contemporary Instrumental Album
Kathryn Kaye	Patterns of Sun and Shade	2015	Producer, Accompaniment, Bass, Percussion	2015 ZMR Best Piano Album with Instrumentation
Jeff Oster	Next	2015	Producer, arranger, engineer, Mixing, Bass, composer, Fender Rhodes, Guitar, Hammond B3, Handclapping, Keyboards, Loop Programming, Percussion, Piano, Synthesizer	2015 ZMR Album of the Year, Best Chill / Groove Album
Lawrence Blatt	Emergence	2014	Recording, Mixing, and Mastering	2014 ZMR Best Instrumental Album, Acoustic
Jennifer DeFrayne	By A Wire	2014	Engineer, Mixing, Mastering, Bass, Cajon, Guitar (Bass), Guitar (Electric), Keyboards, Percussion, Tambourine, Vocals, Water Bottle, Wood Block	2014 ZMR Best New Artist
Jill Haley	Mesa Verde Soundscapes	2014	Producer, engineer, Mixing, Mastering, Bass Engineer, Guitar Engineer, Piano Engineer	2014 ZMR Best Piano Album with Instrumentation
Masako	Call of the Mountains	2014	Producer, engineer, Mixing, Mastering	2014 ZMR Best Piano Album, Solo
Kathryn Kaye	What the Winter Said	2013	Producer, Recording, Mixing, Mastering, Accordion, Autoharp, Bass	2013 ZMR Best Holiday Album
Masako	Masako	2013	Producer, engineer, Mixing, Mastering	2013 ZMR Best New Artist
Shambhu	Dreaming of Now	2013	Producer, engineer, Mixing, Mastering	2013 ZMR Best Contemporary Instrumental Album
Todd Boston	Touched by the Sun	2012	Producer, engineer, Mixing, Mastering, Clapping	2012 ZMR Best Instrumental Album, Acoustic
The Gathering	The Gathering	2012	Producer, Editing, Mastering	2012 ZMR Album of the Year, Best Contemporary Instrumental Album

== Discography ==
- Winter Loves Company with Kristen Miller (2010)
- abendromen (2016)
- indesterren (2016)
- Days of Green and Light (2016)
- SPICA/ACIPS (2018)
- how it happened (2019)
- elements: audio environments – air (2020)
- elements: audio environments – earth (2020)
- elements: audio environments – fire (2020)
- elements: audio environments – water (2020)
- snapshots (2021)
- Brothers with Will Ackerman and Jeff Oster (2021)
- shades of fog (2022)
- verloren (2022)
- twenty-two: collected singles 2021–2022 (2022)
- ghosts (EP) (2023)
- linger (2023)
- weathering (2023)
- into the fall (2023)
- the hours (2024)
- verloren II: elevations (2024)
- seven conversations with Jeff Oster and Vin Downes (2024)
- found: collected singles 2024-2025 (2025)
- until the light was gone with Vin Downes (2026)
- oto (2026)
