= Daniel Levin =

Daniel Levin may refer to:

- Daniel Levin (attorney) (active 2004-2005), Acting Assistant Attorney General for the Office of Legal Counsel of the U.S. Justice Department
- Daniel Levin (author) (born 1963), Swiss-American writer, attorney, and political commentator
- Daniel Levin (writer) (born c. 1980), American attorney and novelist

== See also ==
- Daniel Levine (disambiguation)
- Daniel Lewin (1970–2001), American-Israeli mathematician and entrepreneur
