= Laura Sullivan (disambiguation) =

Laura Sullivan may refer to:

- Laura Sullivan (born 1974), American Investigative reporter
- Laura Sullivan (composer), American composer, pianist
- Laura Sullivan, character in Dancouga – Super Beast Machine God
