= Daniel Levine =

Daniel Levine may refer to:

- Dan Levine, American film producer
- Daniel Levine (composer) (born 1949), musical theater composer
- Daniel Levine (actor) (born 1972), Broadway actor

== See also ==
- Daniel Levin (disambiguation)
