= Jeff Oster =

American musician (born 1957)

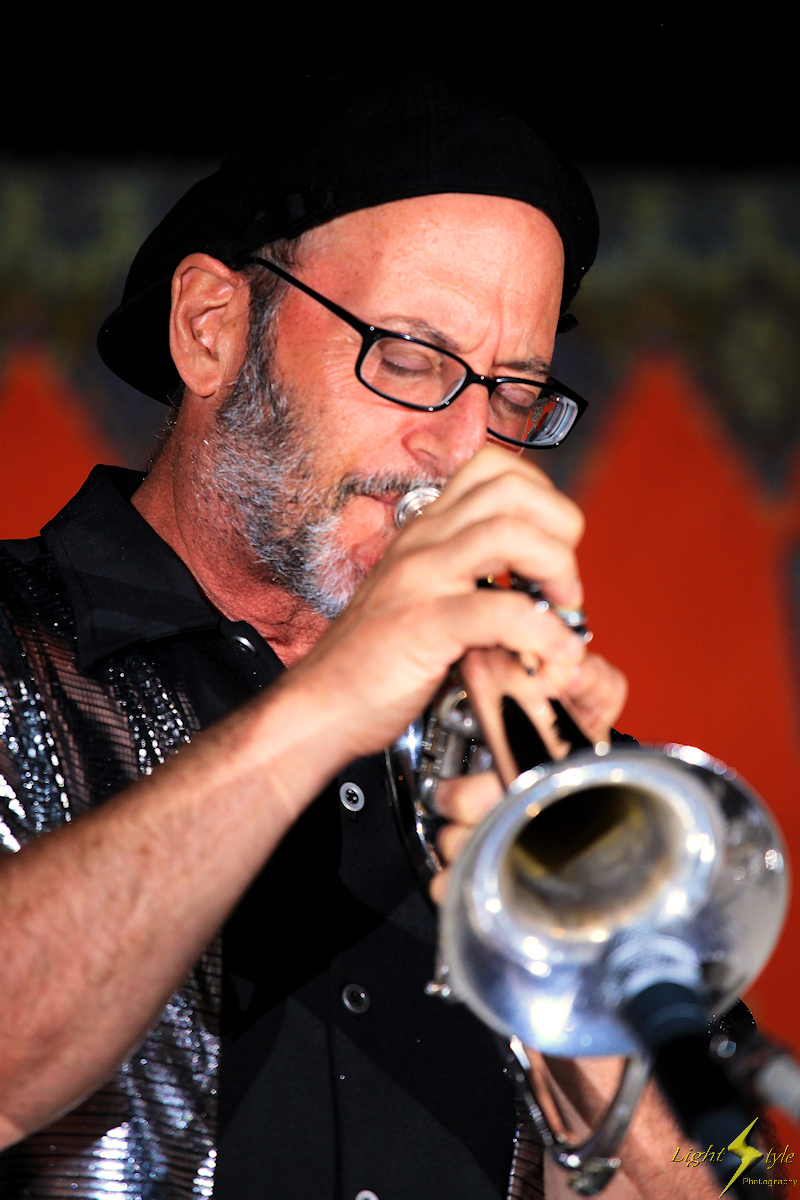
- Jeff Oster

Background information
- Born: Jeffrey Oster; 1957 (age 68–69); Danville, Illinois, US
- Genres: Jazz, New Age, Ambient, Funk
- Occupations: Musician, composer, producer, financial advisor
- Instruments: Trumpet, flugelhorn
- Years active: 2003-present
- Labels: Retso; Artist Garage
- Website: jeffoster.com

Jeff Oster (born 1957) is a Grammy-nominated American musician who specializes in trumpet and flugelhorn in the New Age music genre. He is a member of the four-piece band Flow. Oster's style has been described as "Miles Davis meets Pink Floyd." He is a three-time winner of the Independent Music Awards and ten-time winner of the Zone Music Reporter Awards (formerly NAR LifeStyle Music Awards). He was featured on the Laura Sullivan's Grammy-winning album Love's River. Flow's debut album reached number 4 on the Billboard New Age Albums Chart in 2017.

== Early life ==
Oster grew up in Highland Park, Illinois. After several moves, he attended Coral Gables Senior High School in Florida, and was a member of their marching band "Cavaliers Band of Distinction" The band's director William Ledue was influential in his formation as a trumpeter and got him his first job playing "Taps" at the funeral of a veteran. In 1978, at age 19, Oster discovered Chuck Mangione's album "Feels So Good" which led him to order a Yamaha Flugelhorn that he still plays today. Oster was inducted into the Coral Gables Hall of Fame in 2023.

After high school through 1987 Oster performed with a variety of acts including three piece power rock trio in Miami, Los Angeles and performed in big bands and as a horn player with R&B bands, and a casino lounge band that toured Vegas, Lake Tahoe, and Atlantic City.

During this time, Oster wrote singer/songwriter music and unsuccessfully tried to get them covered by other artists. After struggling ten years living in Los Angeles he decided turned to writing original music. In 1987, at the recommendation of a friend, Oster passed his Series 7 exam, became a financial advisor, and decided to save enough money to hire professionals to record his music.

== New age transition ==
By 2003, Oster started writing instrumental horn music when he purchased a personal computer with music creation software on it. After uploading performances of that music to MP3.com, he found that four songs were downloaded at a rate of 40,000 per month and were on the website's Top Ten Downloads list.

Oster connected with Will Ackerman, the founder of Windham Hill Records, an artist Oster had been listening to and playing along with since 1979. In late 2003, Oster and Ackerman recorded four of these tracks on his debut extended play (EP) album At Last. The title song from At Last won the Best New Age Song award at the 5th Annual Independent Music Awards in 2006.

Oster's first full-length album titled RELEASED in 2005 which received the 2005 Album of the Year and Best Contemporary Instrumental Album awards at the NAR Lifestyle Music Awards, voted on by broadcasters.

== Continuing musical career ==
In 2007, Oster teamed up again with Ackerman on TRUE. The first track of the album, Saturn Calling, won the 7th Annual Independent Music Awards' Best New Age Song in 2008. The album also won the Album of the Year and Best Contemporary Instrumental Album awards at the NAR Lifestyle Music Awards.

Oster's SURRENDER album, released in 2011, received Zone Music Reporter's Album of the Year and Best Chill/Groove Album awards. The nationally syndicated NPR radio show Echoes' staff selected the album for their 25 Essential CDs for 2011.

In 2015, Oster released his album next. It received Zone Music Reporter's Album of the Year and Best Chill/Groove Album awards

In 2016, Oster also released Jeff Oster Live! from performances at The Fenix in San Rafael.

In 2018, Oster released Reach.

In 2019, Oster's album REACH won the Best New Age Album Award and his song "Five Great Mountains" won the Best New Age Song Award at the Independent Music Awards. REACH received Zone Music Reporter's Album of the Year and Best Contemporary Instrumental Album.

=== Collaborations ===
==== NASA ====
In 2007, Oster took the sound rendering of data collected by the Cassini spacecraft's radio and plasma wave science instruments as the basis for the song "Saturn Calling" which appeared as the first track on his album "TRUE." The song received the Best New Age Song award at 7th Annual Independent Music Awards in 2008.

==== Blue Eternity ====
Oster also performs with Michael Manring (founder of the group Montreux) and Carl Weingarten (a founding member of the progressive rock group, Delay Tactics) in a group called Blue Eternity. They perform at venues such as the Fujitsu Planetarium at De Anza College in Cupertino, CA.

==== Laura Sullivan ====
In 2012, Oster was a featured artist on two tracks of Laura Sullivan's Grammy Award-winning album Love's River.

==== Pete Seeger ====
In 2013, Oster and other artists wrote and performed music on Pete Seeger's spoken word album Pete Seeger: The Storm King; Stories, Narratives, Poems, which Seeger released at the age of 93. The album was nominated for a Grammy Award for Best Spoken Word Album.

==== Flow ====
In 2015, guitarist Lawrence Blatt, pianist Fiona Joy Hawkins, producer/guitarist William Ackerman, and Oster formed the group Flow. They recorded the self-titled album Flow, released in 2017.

The album was #4 in Billboard's New Age Album chart on October 28. The album received the ‘New Age Album of the Year’ at the 16th Annual Independent Music Awards. It held the #1 position on the ZoneMusicReporter's (ZMR) Top 100 Radio Airplay Chart for two months, was nominated for and won two ZMR awards, ’Album of the Year’ and ‘Best Contemporary Instrumental Album’, at 14th Annual ZMR Awards.

In 2019 Flow released the album Promise.

==== Deepak Chopra ====
In 2017, Deepak Chopra, a prominent figure in the New Age movement, together with Kabir Sehgal and Paul Avgerinos published a book titled "Home: Where Everyone is Welcome," featuring 34 poems and accompanied by a CD of twelve songs inspired by immigrants cultural contribution to the United States. Along with Chopra, Sehgal, and Avgerinos, Oster and Ackerman co-produced the CD with Oster performing on three tracks.

==== Departure ====
In 2018, Oster began performing with FLOW's co-producer Tom Eaton and guitarist Vin Downes in a group they named Departure and appeared on an Echoes streaming "living room concert." One of the songs performed in the streaming concert appears on Echoes album, Victoria Place: Echoes Live 23. Departure has also performed at the 1867 Sanctuary Arts & Culture Center in Ewing, NJ.

Brothers

In July, 2021, Oster, William Ackerman and Tom Eaton began to record the album Brothers. Originally, Brothers was conceived by Oster as a collaboration with Ackerman, but based on Eaton's contributions, Eaton was made a "brother" and given equal billing. Recording took place at Eaton's studio in Newburyport, MA and Ackerman's Imaginary Road Studios in Vermont. Eaton performed on piano, keyboard, bass, percussion, and electric guitar, Ackerman performed on acoustic guitar, and Oster performed on flugelhorn and trumpet. The album was nominated for the Grammy Award for Best New Age Album.

In 2023 Oster released a lo-fi album, hØwling lØØn, which has been submitted for nomination to the 66th Grammy Awards.

== Influences and style ==
Oster has said "As I've grown, I've been inspired by Bill Chase, and Herb Alpert, and Miles Davis and Chris Botti, along with Steely Dan, Pink Floyd, Will Ackerman, Yes, U2, and today by artists such as Kendrick Lamar."

Oster's style has been often described as "Miles Davis meets Pink Floyd" or "Miles Davis meets Enya."

== Financial services career ==
Oster has been working in financial services. From 1988 to 1994 he worked with Independent Advantage Financial where he became a senior vice president and national sales manager. From 1994 to 1997, he worked with Prudential Securities as a senior vice president in investments, and since then has served as a Registered Principal and Branch Manager of Raymond James Financial.

== Discography ==
- At Last (EP, 2004)
- Released (2005)
- True (2007)
- Surrender (2011)
- Next (2015)
- Jeff Oster Live! (2016)
- Reach (2018)
- Brothers (2021)
- hØwling lØØn (2023)
