= Imaginary Roads =

Studio album by William Ackerman
- Released: 1988
- Genre: New-age
- Length: 51:18
- Label: Windham Hill
- Producer: William Ackerman; Dawn Atkinson

William Ackerman chronology
Conferring with the Moon: Pieces for Guitar (1986)	Imaginary Roads (1988)	The Opening of Doors (2002)

Imaginary Roads is an album by the new-age guitarist William Ackerman, released in 1988. The album was reissued in 2009 by Valley Entertainment.

== Critical reception ==
Professional ratings
Review scores
Source	Rating
AllMusic	4.5/5 stars
The Encyclopedia of Popular Music	3/5 stars
The Rolling Stone Album Guide	2.5/5 stars

The Kingston Whig-Standard wrote that the album "consists mainly of [Ackerman] simply strumming his acoustic guitar ever-so-slowly ... five years ago this stuff sounded revolutionary and filled a need for baby-boomers who couldn't relate to the current musical marketplace."

The Encyclopedia of Popular Music (Oxford University Press) describes Imaginary Roads as "one of guitarist William Ackerman’s finest albums, and the one where the new instruments Ackerman had been slowly adding to his sound through the 80s finally jelled with his distinctive playing. The result is that even on the duet pieces, Ackerman and his musical partners sound and feel like an actual band, not a composer and his sidemen. Interesting additions like shakuhachi flute, oboe, and fretless bass join the usual synthesizers, piano and violins, giving a variety and depth to the arrangements that is sometimes missing from Ackerman’s more monochromatic earlier albums."

== Track listing ==
1. "The Moment in Which You Must Finally Let Go of the Tether Which Has Held Your Hope Airborne" – 5:42
2. "A Region of Clouds" – 4:42
3. "If You Look" – 5:39
4. "Floyd's Ghost" – 6:18
5. "Wondering Again What's Behind the Eyes" – 5:50
6. "Dawn Treader" – 4:21
7. "The Prospect of Darrow's Barn and the Blossoms of an Apple Spring on Imaginary Road" – 3:03
8. "Brother A Teaches 7" – 2:57
9. "Innocent Moon" – 3:37
10. "The Moment – Reprise" – 0:37
11. "If You Look - Version II" - 5:30 [*]
12. "Darrow's Barn - Version II" - 3:05 [*]

== Production ==
- Recorded at Studio D, Sausalito, California, and Different Fur Recording, San Francisco, California.

== Other contributors ==
- Allaudin Mathieu – piano on "The Moment in Which You Must Finally Let Go of the Tether Which Has Held Your Hope Airborne"
- Chuck Greenberg – Lyricon, Yamaha WX-7 wind synthesizer and Yamaha DX7 keyboard synthesizer on "If You Look"
- Michael Manring – fretless bass guitar on "If You Look" and "Brother A Teaches 7"
- Philip Aaberg – piano on "Floyd's Ghost"
- Kifu Mitsuhashi – shakuhachi flute on "Wondering Again What's Behind the Eyes"
- Jill Haley – oboe on "The Prospect of Darrow's Barn and the Blossoms of an Apple Spring on Imaginary Road"
- Charles Bisharat – violin on "Brother A Teaches 7"
