= In Search of the Turtle's Navel =

- Cover of 1977 reissue

Studio album by Will Ackerman
- Released: 1976
- Recorded: 1975, Mantra Studios, San Mateo, CA
- Genre: American primitive, new age
- Length: 45:05
- Label: Windham Hill
- Producer: Scott Saxon & William Ackerman

Will Ackerman chronology
In Search of the Turtle's Navel (1976)	It Takes a Year (1977)

Professional ratings
Review scores
Source	Rating
AllMusic	3/5 stars
The Encyclopedia of Popular Music	3/5 stars
Pitchfork	8.6/10

In Search of the Turtle's Navel (originally titled "The Search for the Turtle's Navel" before the 1977 reissue) is the 1976 debut album by guitarist Will Ackerman. Some consider the album to be the start of new-age music. The album took Ackerman from his work as a carpenter and head of Windham Hill Builders to becoming a professional musician and executive of Windham Hill Records.

The picture on the album cover is one Ackerman took of his younger sister Elinor when they were children.

The album was reissued in 1977 with a slightly different track listing ("Dance for the Death of a Bird" was moved to the end and "Woman She Rides" was omitted) and a modified cover art (Elinor's picture, previously occupying the entirety of the front cover, was now cropped onto a white background).

== Track listing ==
All compositions by Will Ackerman

Original Track Listing (1976)

1. "The Pink Chiffon Tricycle Queen" – 5:32
2. "Ely" – 5:26
3. "Windham Mary" – 4:27
4. "Processional" – 3:43
5. "Dance for the Death of a Bird" – 3:27
6. "Second Great Tortion Bar Overland of West Townshend, Vermont, Jose Pepsi Attending" – 2:33
7. "What the Buzzard Told Suzanne" – 4:33
8. "Barbara's Song" – 7:28
9. "Gazos" – 4:36
10. "Slow Motion Roast Beef Restaurant Seduction" – 3:34
11. "Woman She Rides" – 2:43

Rerelease Track Listing (1977–present)

1. "The Pink Chiffon Tricycle Queen" – 5:32
2. "Ely" – 5:26
3. "Windham Mary" – 4:27
4. "Processional" – 3:43
5. "Second Great Tortion Bar Overland of West Townshend, Vermont, Jose Pepsi Attending" – 2:33
6. "What the Buzzard Told Suzanne" – 4:33
7. "Barbara's Song" – 7:28
8. "Gazos" – 4:36
9. "Slow Motion Roast Beef Restaurant Seduction" – 3:34
10. "Dance for the Death of a Bird" – 3:27
