= Laura Sullivan (composer) =

American composer, pianist, author

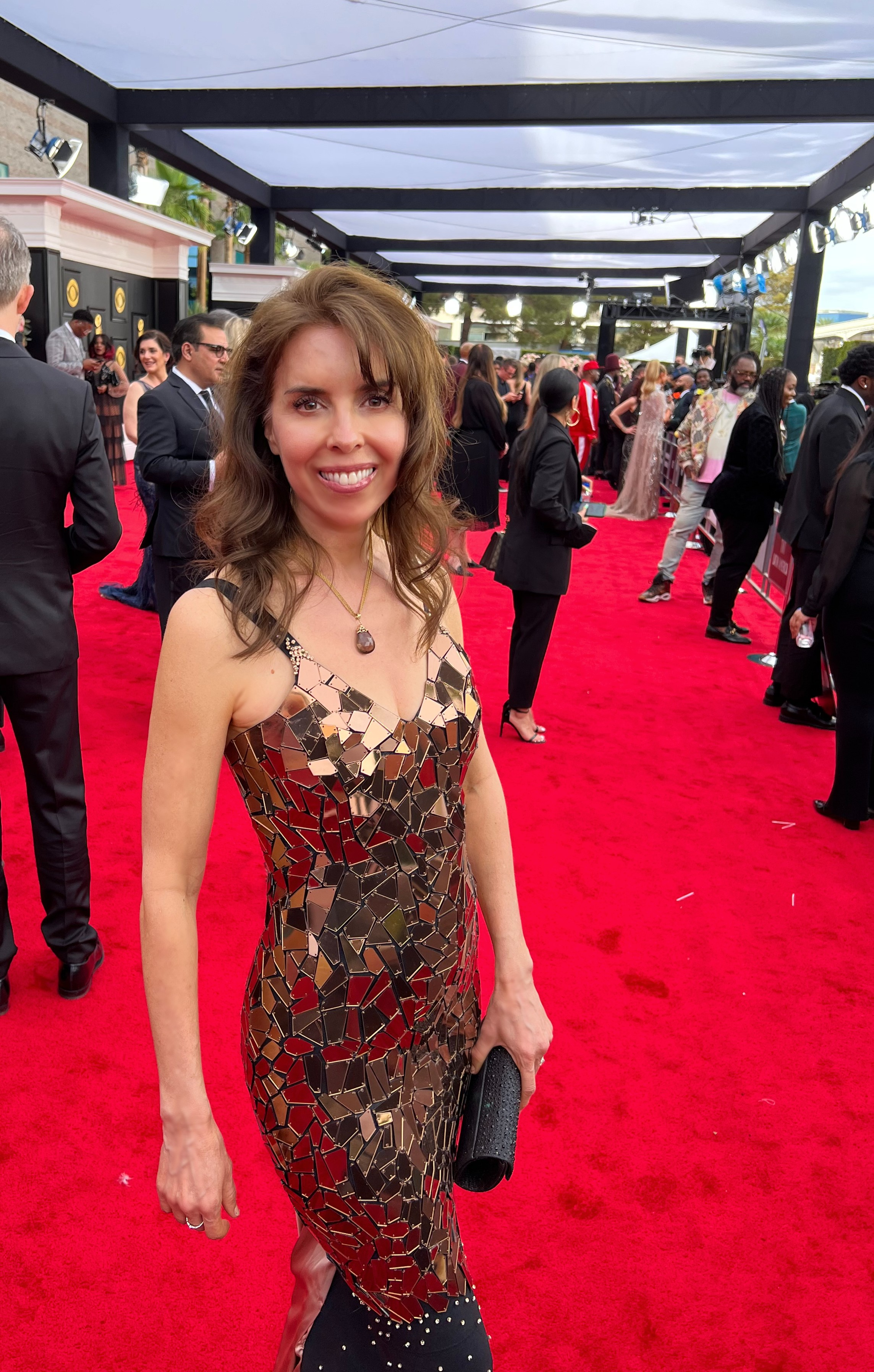
- Sullivan in 2022

Background information
- Genres: Classical music New-age music Native American music Pop music World music
- Occupation: Music composer
- Instrument: Piano
- Labels: Sentient Spirit Records; North Star Music; Orange Music
- Website: laura-sullivan.com

Laura Sullivan is an American composer, arranger, pianist, producer, author, and a New-age, World, Spoken Word, Native American, and Pop music artist. She has worked with leading musicians of the industry and Grammy award winners including Eric Sullivan, Nancy Rumbel, Jeff Oster, Eugene Friesen, and Will Ackerman. She is best known for her album, Love's River, which won the Grammy Award for Best New Age Album in the 56th Annual Grammy Awards. Love’s River was recognized as one of the best commercial productions by Will Ackerman after 2009. Sullivan's album Pieces of Forever was nominated for Best New Age Album in the 64th Annual Grammy Awards.

== Early life and education ==
Laura Sullivan was raised in a farm in NorCal near Mt.Lassen. As a child, Sullivan started learning piano from her mother at the age of 4. Her mother, Carol Purdy was a children's book writer. She graduated from California State University, Chico where she received a BA in music with specialization in piano, and a master's degree in psychology from USF. San Francisco State University (CSU) and Academy of Art University have hosted her as a guest presenter in their music courses. She went to New York City for completing graduate training at the music department of the New School.

== Career ==
During her career, Sullivan's works have appeared in multiple videos and commercials, including a Hyundai commercial with voice-over done by Jeff Bridges, and an infomercial for Everyday Paleo. Her music is also featured in two Emmy Award-winning documentaries, Walk into the Wild: Spirit of Itasca and The Greatest Silent Sport. Sullivan composed the original soundtrack for the film Valentines Day Special, which starred Jon Polito, and performed the music for the track "Sleepwalking on a Tightrope" in the movie Wake, written by Henry LeRoy Finch. Later, Gio Vitelle approached her to compose music for the feature film Emotions. The film premiered at the New York International Independent Film and Video Festival. She has also composed original music for Gunther Thallinger's short film Nine and A Half Minutes Left.

== Collaborations ==
Sullivan performed on D. Edward's album Love Is released in 2014. Other artists on the album include Grammy winners Steffen Kuehn and Tony Peebles from the Pacific Mambo Orchestra, as well as Billboard Music Award Winner, Leah Tysse. She also appeared on the album Omkara – The Sound of Divine Love, based on Chakra and healing music which was conceived, directed and produced by Rupam Sarmah, Guinness World Record holder of most instruments used in a piece of music. Along with Sullivan, the album features Grammy winner Pandit Vishwa Mohan Bhatt, Padmashri Sumitra Guha, Rocia Marron, Grammy winner Brian Vibberts, Pt. Subhen Chatterjee, Jonathan Kay, Matthias Muller, among others.

In 2013, Sullivan performed on the album Sounds from the Circle V produced by Suzanne Doucet. Other artists on the album include Steven Halpern, Arun Shenoy, David Vito Gregoli, Pardiso, among others.

In 2014, Sullivan performed on the album Angel Blessings (Benefitting Hospice) produced by Lucinda Paulos. In addition to Sullivan, this album featured Dr. Wayne Dyer, George Kahumoku Jr., Miss Amy, Orlando Otey, Ricky Kej, Alex Otey, among others. Later in 2014, producer Will Ackerman and Tom Eaton featured her on their album The Gathering II. The compilation album featured 22 artists, including Jeff Pearce, Isadar, Jeff Oster and others, produced and recorded at Imaginary Roads Studios, owned by Windham Hill Records founder, Will Ackerman.

== Discography ==
- Piano Solos (2003)
- Trails of North America (2003)
- Mystical America (2004)
- Feast of Joy & Love (2007)
- Close to Home (2008)
- Love's River (2013)
- Calm Within (2015)
- The Modern Romantic (2016)
- Timeless (2016)
- Healing (2017)
- Zelda (2018)
- Serenity (2018)
- A Magical Christmas (2018)
- Paris Enjoué (2019)
- Reverie (2020)
- Pieces of Forever (2021)
- Instrumental Pop Covers (2021)

== Bibliography ==
- Sullivan, Laura (2011). Born Virtuosos: The Innovative Piano Course. Sentient Spirit Records. ISBN 978-1427651549.

== Media appearances ==
Sullivan was the lead artist in a documentary named Music Across America presenting portraits of musicians, singers and songwriters across the United States. Other prominent artists on the show include Jake Shimabukuro, Amy Hānaialiʻi Gilliom, and Little Feat.

Sullivan's performance of the Claire de Lune was used on season 10 of the television show So You Think You Can Dance with judges Nigel Lythgoe, Mary Murphy and Carly Rae Jepsen.

== Accolades ==
- Jane Bowman Jewett Music Award
- Emily A. Hauss Music Award
- Grammy Award for Best New Age Album

== See also ==
- List of American composers
- List of new-age music artists
