= Fiona Joy Hawkins =

Australian vocalist & pianist

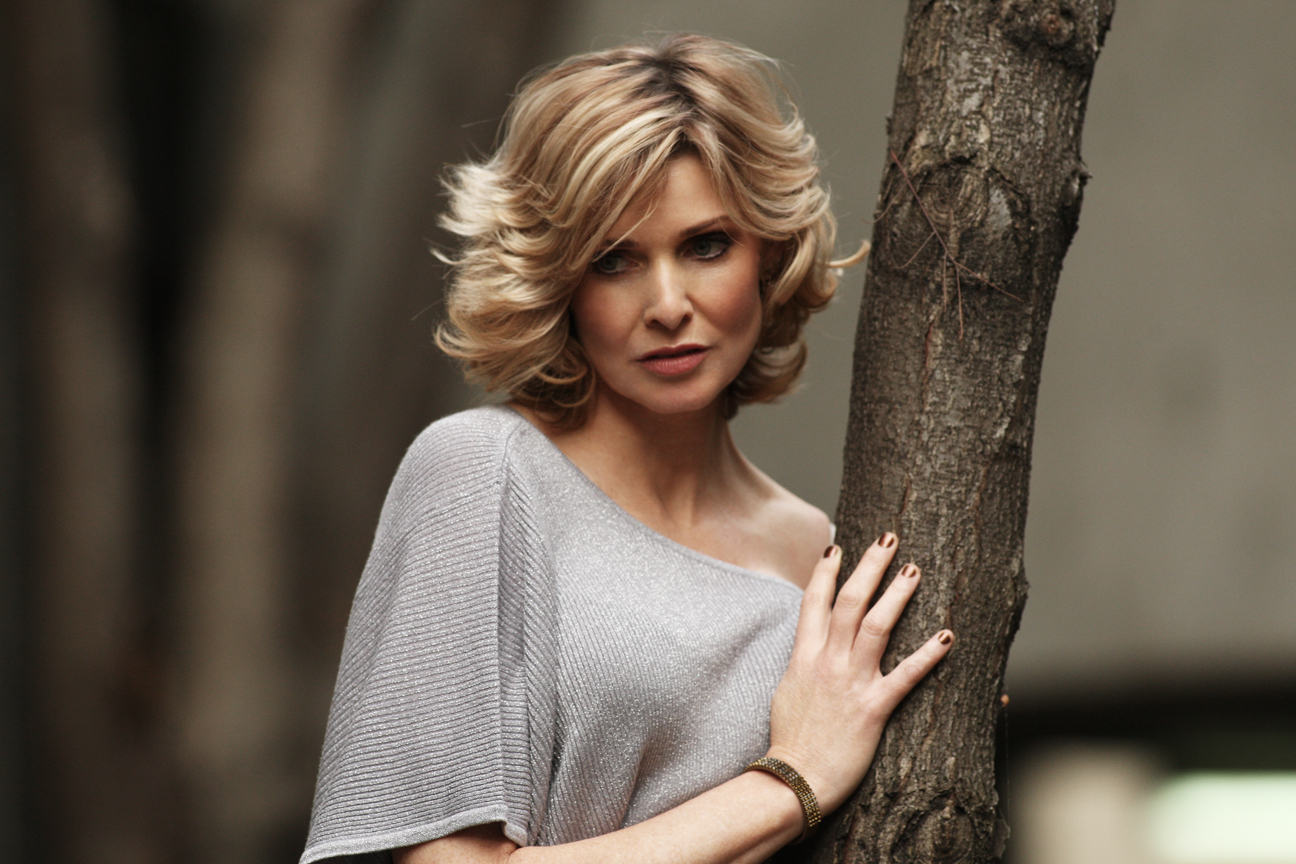

Background information
- Born: Cessnock, New South Wales, Australia
- Genres: Classical, new-age, world
- Occupations: Musician, composer
- Instruments: Piano, vocals
- Years active: 2000s–present
- Labels: Little Hartley, Blue Coast
- Website: fionajoy.au

Fiona Joy Hawkins, is an Australian vocalist and pianist. Her collaborations have included five albums produced by Will Ackerman. Her influences include George Winston, Michael Nyman, Chopin, and Mendelssohn.

The Sydney Morning Herald said of her in 2007 that she "ranks among the world's best in her genre, but struggles for recognition in her home country" of Australia, largely due to the lack of recognition given to the genre by Australian music critics until she won the 2006 ZMR award. Fiona Joy is the first Australian to place in the top ten on the ZMR chart and the first to win a ZMR award.

== Early life ==
Fiona Joy was born in Cessnock, New South Wales, Australia, and raised in both Newcastle and Tamworth. She began to study the piano at a young age, composing short pieces before she was a teenager. She trained at the Tamworth Conservatorium of Music under tutor Ursula Bakker and showed early signs of musical talent. Her teachers included Es Clarke, Ursula Bakker, and Maureen Newell.

== Musical career ==
Her first album, Portrait of a Waterfall, charted at No. 1 on the New Age Reporter (NAR) World Charts in 2005. Her classical release, Angel Above My Piano, earned the NAR Lifestyle Music Award for Best Piano Album of the Year for 2006.

She has been a finalist multiple times in both the Musicoz Awards in the jazz and classical categories, and the Los Angeles Music Awards in the New Age/Ambient Instrumental category.

In 2008, Fiona Joy was the 2008 MusicOz winner for Best Jazz or Classical Artist. In 2009 she won Album of the Year, Best Contemporary Instrumental Album, and Best Instrumental Album by Zone Music Reporter for her album Blue Dream. The album was also a finalist for an ARIA Music Award.

Her fifth album, 600 Years in a Moment (2013), draws on Celtic music from her family traditions as well as vocal and instrumental performances intended to represent Mongolia, Hungary, China, Africa, Tibet, Ireland, the Middle East, and Native America. She played a Stuart & Sons piano and was recorded in Newcastle, Australia, in Vermont at Ackerman's Imaginary Road Studios, Los Angeles, New York, Bremen and Portland, Maine, and Halifax, Nova Scotia. Featured musicians include cellist Eugene Friesen, bassist Tony Levin, drummer Jeff Haynes, Charlie Bisharat, violinist and vocalist Rebecca Daniel, and guitarists Will Ackerman and Todd Boston. The album was awarded the Best Instrumental Album – Piano at the 2013 ZMR Music Awards.

In 2013 Fiona Joy was a finalist in the Best Live Performance, Best New Age Album, and Best New Age Song categories at the Independent Music Awards. She was also finalist in the Best Live Performance, Best New Age Album, and Best New Age Song categories at the Independent Music Awards that same year.

In 2014, Fiona Joy and Will Ackerman produced the album By a Wire by Jennifer Defrayne with Fiona Joy assisting on piano and lyrics. In 2014 her song "Grace" appeared on the compilation album Winds of Samsara, which reached No. 1 on the Billboard New Age albums chart. and won the Grammy Award for Best New Age Album.

In 2015, Zhou Tiebing, of the Xiangyang Government Network, labelled Hawkins the "piano princess" after her performance in Shenyang.

Her 2016 album Signature Synchronicity received the Independent Music Award for Best New Age Song for "Song Calling Earth" and the award for Best New Age Album. It also received the ZMR Award for Best Piano Album.

In May 2017, Fiona Joy's second solo piano album, Into The Mist, was released on Blue Coast Records.

In October, 2017, Fiona Joy joined with Lawrence Blatt, Jeff Oster, and Will Ackerman and created the group New Age group “FLOW" (from the first letters of Fiona Joy', Blatt's, Ackerman's first name and Oster's last name). FLOW debuted with a performance at Carnegie Hall's Weill Hall on October 6, 2017.

In early 2018, Fiona Joy released Story of Ghosts as her third audiophile release with Blue Coast Records. It was nominated for Zone Music Reporter's Best Piano Album - Solo.

In 2019, Fiona Joy teamed with Rebecca Daniel and released the album The Lightness of Dark featuring the Kanimbla Quartet. She also appeared with FLOW on the album Promise.

She has also been interviewed regarding trends in the use of high-end pianos and the potential changes new instruments make to a musician's compositions.

Fiona Joy is a painter whose works have been exhibited at the Butterflies Gallery in Pokolbin as well as internationally.

== Discography ==
=== Albums ===
List of albums
Title	Album details
Portrait of a Waterfall	Released: 2005; Label: Little Hartley Music (FJH001); Formats: CD
Angel Above My Piano	Released: 2006; Label: Little Hartley Music (FJ-02-AAMP); Formats: CD
Blue Dream	Released: 2008; Label: Little Hartley Music (FJH004); Formats: CD
Ice - Piano Slightly Chilled	Released: 2008; Label: Little Hartley Music (FJ-03-PSC); Formats: CD
Live at the Q (with The Blue Dream Ensemble)	Released: 2011; Label: Little Hartley Music (FJH010); Formats: CD
Sensual Journeys	Released: 2012; Label: Little Hartley Music (FJH016); Formats: CD
600 Years in a Moment	Released: 2013; Label: Little Hartley Music (FJH013/FJH015/FJH019); Formats: CD, 2×LP, digital

- Music for Massage (Compilation) (2010)
- Music for Weddings (Compilation) (2010)
- Music for Funerals (Compilation) (2010)
- Christmas Joy (2011)
- Signature – Solo (2015) (as "Fiona Joy")
- Signature – Synchronicity (2016) (as "Fiona Joy")
- Into The Mist (2017) (as "Fiona Joy")
- Flow (2017) (as "Fiona Joy")
- Story of Ghosts (2018) (as "Fiona Joy")
- The Lightness of Dark (2019) (as "Fiona Joy Hawkins") with Rebecca Daniel featuring the Kanimbla Quartet
- Moving Through Worlds (2020)
- Heavenly Voices (2021) (as "Fiona Joy Hawkins") and Rebecca Daniel for Blue Coast Records

== Awards and nominations ==
=== ARIA Music Awards ===
The ARIA Music Awards is an annual awards ceremony that recognises excellence, innovation, and achievement across all genres of Australian music. They commenced in 1987.

Year	Nominee / work	Award	Result	Ref.
2009	Blue Dream	Best World Music Album	Nominated	
