= Flow (American band) =

New Age music group of one native Australian and three Americans

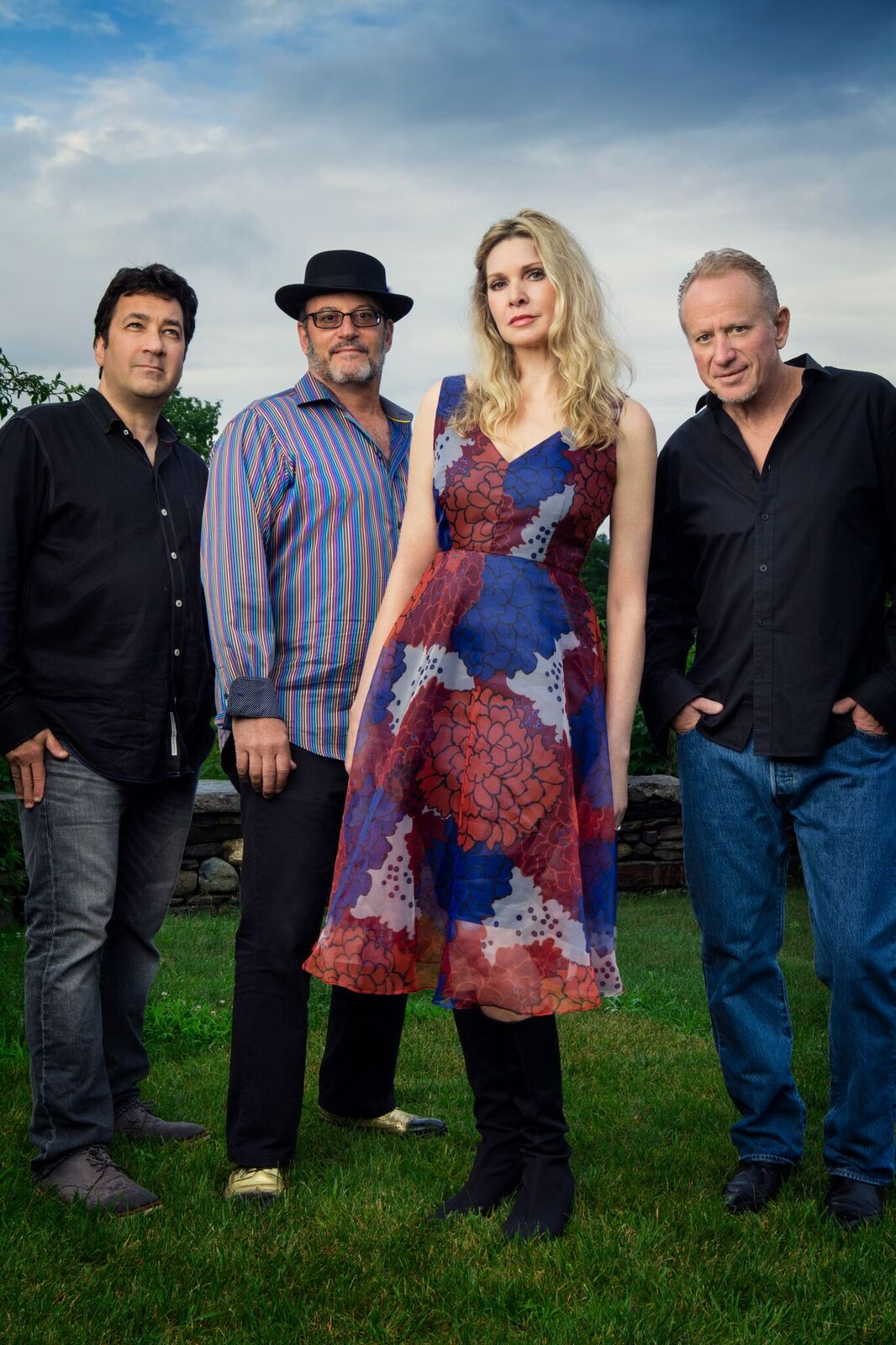
- Lawrence Blatt, Jeff Oster, Fiona Joy, and William Ackerman

Background information
- Origin: U.S.
- Genre: New Age
- Years active: 2017–present
- Label: LMB Music
- Members: William Ackerman; Lawrence Blatt; Fiona Joy; Jeff Oster
- Website: flowthegroup.com

Flow (stylised as FLOW) is an American New Age music group consisting of pianist/vocalist Fiona Joy from Australia, guitarist Lawrence Blatt, trumpeter and flugelhornist Jeff Oster, and guitarist Will Ackerman, all from the United States. The band's name is an anagram of the initials of their names.

== History ==
In 2015, Blatt invited Joy and Oster to record with him at Ackerman's Imaginary Road Studios to create an album emblematic of past iconic Windham Hill ensembles, with Ackerman and Tom Eaton serving as co-producers. Once the trio began recording, it became clear that Ackerman could be an essential part of this group as an artist as well as producer. The group was launched as a four-piece group when Ackerman agreed to take a more foundational role.

The formation of Flow was cited by New Age music expert Stephen Hill as an example of renaissance in the genre: "in the last few years, the New Age genre has seen a critical reconsideration, with carefully curated compilations of historical material, while both veterans and descendants of the genre are creating new music that merits serious attention. A good example is the group FLOW, which includes none other than steel string guitarist Will Ackerman, in a kind of New Age 'supergroup.'"

Flow released its debut album on October 6, 2017. Accompanying Blatt, Joy, Oster, and Ackerman on the album were Marc Shulman, Tony Levin, Jeff Haynes, Sam Bevan, Eugene Friesen, and Tom Eaton. The album has received critical acclaim by Zone Music Reporter, Contemporary Fusion Reviews, World Music Central, All About Jazz, and Ambient Visions. Coincidental with the album's release, Flow debuted the album at Carnegie Hall's Weill Recital Hall. Performing with Flow were Eugene Friesen (cellist), Vin Downes, guitarist, Jeff Haynes, percussion, and Eaton on bass and keyboards.

== Inaugural tour ==
Flow's 2018 tour Arrival included performances at The New Orleans Jazz Museum, the 14th Annual ZMR Awards show, in Seattle, Oregon and Marin, California and concluded at Los Angeles' Grammy Museum.

== Awards and honors ==
The album received New Age Album of the Year at the 16th annual Independent Music Awards show at Lincoln Center in New York City on April 3, 2018.

The album held the No. 1 position on the ZoneMusicReporter's (ZMR) Top 100 Radio Airplay Chart for two months, was nominated for and won two ZMR's awards, Album of the Year and Best Contemporary Instrumental Album, at 14th Annual ZMR Awards show on May 12, 2018 at Loyola University's Roussel Hall in New Orleans.

In 2019, the group's song "Last Light" was nominated as the Best New Age Song by the Independent Music Awards. It also released the album Promise.

== Discography ==
- Flow (2017)
- Promise (2019)
