= Love's River =

Studio album by Laura Sullivan
- Released: 2013
- Genre: New age
- Label: Sentient Spirit Records

Love's River is a 2013 studio album by Laura Sullivan. It received the 2014 Grammy Award for Best New Age Album. Love's River climbed to number 3 on the Top 100 Airplay Chart of Zone Music Reporter in January 2013 and to number 2 in February 2013.

== Track listing ==
All tracks are written by Laura Sullivan.

No.	Title	Length
1.	"Secrets From the Deep"	4:35
2.	"Wishing On a Dandelion"	4:31
3.	"Awakening To Love"	5:09
4.	"Blessed"	5:47
5.	"Holding Heaven"	5:09
6.	"Moonlight Passage"	4:53
7.	"Love's River"	3:54
8.	"Calligraphy"	8:02
9.	"River To the Sea"	4:56
10.	"Story of the Rain"	3:12
11.	"Snowfall On Water"	4:36

== Personnel ==
- William Ackerman – guitar, record producer
- Rob Beaton – mastering
- Tom Eaton – engineer
- Eugene Friesen – cello
- Kerry Gogan – creative producer
- Jill Haley – English horn
- Jeff Oster – flugelhorn, trumpet
- Nancy Rumbel – English horn, oboe
- Michael Starita – engineer
- Eric Sullivan – photography, producer
- Laura Sullivan – composer, engineer, orchestration, piano
- Tania Vercher – creation
