= Daniel Levin (author) =

Daniel Levin is a Swiss-American writer, attorney, and political commentator.

== Early life and education ==
Levin grew up in the Middle East, Kenya, and Switzerland. He received his legal education at the University of Zurich, Switzerland (lic. iur./J.D. 1988 and Dr. iur./PhD 1990) and Columbia University School of Law (LL.M. 1993).

== Career ==
Levin is a member of the board of the Liechtenstein Foundation for State Governance. He is a frequent lecturer and political commentator.

== Books ==
- Nothing But a Circus: Misadventures Among the Powerful Penguin Politica, 2017
- Proof of Life: Twenty Days on the Hunt for a Missing Person in the Middle East Workman Publishing, 2021
- Milenas Versprechen Elster & Salis, 2021
