= Daniel Levine (actor) =

American actor

- Born: July 30, 1972 (age 53); Boston, Massachusetts, U.S.
- Education: Brandeis University (BA)
- Occupation: Stage actor

Daniel C. Levine (born July 30, 1972) is an American actor known for his theatre roles

== Early life and education ==
Born in Boston, Levine grew up in Framingham, Massachusetts. He earned a Bachelor of Arts degree in theatre and pre-medicine from Brandeis University in 1994 and briefly attended the Tufts University School of Dental Medicine.

== Career ==
Levine has performed in the Broadway shows Les Misérables, Chicago, Mamma Mia!, The Rocky Horror Show, Jesus Christ Superstar, Tommy, and Little Shop of Horrors. Levine co-starred in the musical version of Chicago with Debbie Gibson. He has also appeared in several films and commercials. He starred as Cousin Kevin in the National Tour of The Who's Tommy.

== Filmography ==
=== Film ===
Year	Title	Role	Notes
2001	No Such Thing	Pissing Kid	
2008	Calling It Quits	Todd	

=== Television ===
Year	Title	Role	Notes
1999	Beverly Hills, 90210	The Announcer	Episode: "Agony"
