= William Ackerman =

American guitarist and record producer

- Also known as: Will Ackerman
- Born: November 16, 1949 (age 76)
- Genres: New-age, jazz, pop
- Occupations: Musician, record producer
- Instrument: Guitar
- Years active: 1976–present
- Labels: Windham Hill, Imaginary Road, Lifescapes
- Website: williamackerman.com

William Ackerman (born November 16, 1949) is an American guitarist and record producer who founded Windham Hill Records.

== Career ==
=== Early years ===
Ackerman was born in Germany. His adoptive father was a professor of English at Stanford University. He grew up in the San Francisco Bay Area and attended Northfield Mount Hermon School in western Massachusetts. He returned to Palo Alto to study English and History at Stanford University.

His life took a turn when he discovered he had a fondness for carpentry. He was five credits short of graduating when he left Stanford to work as an apprentice to a Norwegian boat builder. In 1972, he founded Windham Hill Builders in Palo Alto while playing music for Stanford theater productions and performing impromptu concerts in town.

=== Windham Hill Records ===
With money borrowed from friends, he recorded his first album, The Search for Turtle's Navel, later changed to In Search of the Turtle's Navel, on his own label, Windham Hill Records in 1976. His second album, It Takes a Year, he released in 1977. Shortly thereafter, Will recorded and produced an album entitled Turning: Turning Back by his cousin, guitarist Alex De Grassi. This was followed by Robbie Basho whose music had inspired Ackerman for years. He left carpentry to pursue music full time in 1980. During that year, the label received national attention via the success of a piano album by George Winston titled Autumn. He then discovered guitarist Michael Hedges at a concert in Palo Alto and immediately signed him to the label. Other musicians in the catalog were Darol Anger, Mike Marshall, Liz Story, and the band Shadowfax. In time, the genre associated with Windham Hill was christened New-age music.

In 1982, A&M Records became Windham Hill's distributor. The label was selling millions of albums, and Ackerman became a wealthy man. Despite outward signs of success, he was diagnosed with depression. By 1984, Ackerman no longer wanted to run a large corporation. He left California for Vermont. He built Imaginary Road Studios in Dummerston, Vermont and has continued to work as a producer. The walls of his studio are covered in more than 20 Gold and Platinum records from US and overseas sales.

=== Awards and honors ===
Grammy Awards

- Best New Age Album, Returning, 2004
- Nominated, Best New Age Album, Brothers, with Jeff Oster, Tom Eaton, 2021

Zone Music Reporter Awards

- Album of the Year, The Gathering, 2012
- Best Contemporary Instrumental Album, The Gathering, 2012
- Lifetime Achievement Award, 2013
- Album of the Year, Flow by Flow with Fiona Joy, Lawrence Blatt, and Jeff Oster, 2017
- Best Contemporary Instrumental Album, Flow by Flow with Fiona Joy, Lawrence Blatt, and Jeff Oster, 2017

== Discography ==
- 1976 In Search of the Turtle's Navel (Windham Hill)
- 1977 It Takes a Year (Windham Hill)
- 1979 Childhood and Memory (Windham Hill)
- 1981 Passage (Windham Hill)
- 1983 Past Light (Windham Hill)
- 1986 Conferring with the Moon (Windham Hill)
- 1988 Imaginary Roads (Windham Hill)
- 1992 The Opening of Doors (Windham Hill)
- 1998 Sound of Wind Driven Rain (Windham Hill)
- 2001 Hearing Voices (Windham Hill)
- 2004 Returning (Mary's Tree)
- 2008 Meditations (Compass Productions)
- 2010 New England Roads (Compass Productions)
- 2017 Flow (LMB) – with group Flow
- 2018 Was It This Lifetime (West River)
- 2019 Four Guitars (independently published)
- 2019 Promise (LMB) – with group Flow
- 2021 Brothers (Retso) – with Jeff Oster, Tom Eaton
- 2021 Positano Songs (Imaginary Road)
- 2026 Home

== See also ==
- List of ambient music artists
