= Montana: A Love Story =

Studio album by George Winston
- Released: October 12, 2004
- Recorded: 2004
- Genre: Folk; ambient; new age
- Length: 54:25
- Label: Windham Hill; Dancing Cat
- Producer: George Winston; Cathy Econom; Howard Johnston

George Winston chronology
Night Divides the Day: The Music of the Doors (2002)	Montana: A Love Story (2004)	Gulf Coast Blues and Impressions: A Hurricane Relief Benefit (2006)

Professional ratings
Review scores
Source	Rating
Allmusic	4/5 stars

Montana: A Love Story is the 14th album of pianist George Winston and tenth solo piano album, released on October 12, 2004.

== Track listing ==
All tracks are written by George Winston except where noted.

No.	Title	Writer(s)	Length
1.	"Thumbelina"	Mark Isham	3:52
2.	"Billy in the Low Land"	Traditional (U.S.); arr. by George Winston	2:32
3.	"Valse Frontenac"		4:10
4.	"The Little House I Used to Live In"	Frank Zappa	2:41
5.	"Montana Glide"	Paul Anastasio	4:14
6.	"Nevertheless, Hello"	Philip Aaberg	4:53
7.	"The Twisting of the Hay Rope (casadh An tSúgáin)"	Douglas Hyde	2:05
8.	"Joy, Hope and Peace"	Alby Potts	2:53
9.	"You Send Me"	Sam Cooke	3:44
10.	"High Plains Lullaby"		4:02
11.	"The Mountains Winds Call Your Name"		2:33
12.	"Music Box (Kōjō no Tsuki)"	Rentarō Taki	3:44
13.	"Raining in Her (The Muse)"		0:58
14.	"(Variations On) Bamboo"	Traditional (China); arr. by George Winston	2:30
15.	"Goodnight, Irene"	Huddie William Ledbetter	4:06
16.	"Sweet Soul (Gôbajie)"		2:35
17.	"Sky (Gōōbajie)"		3:27
Total length:			54:25

== Charts ==
Chart (2004)	Peak position
US Billboard 200	146
