= Plains (album) =

Studio album by George Winston
- Released: September 28, 1999
- Recorded: 1999
- Genre: Folk; ambient; new age
- Length: 72:49
- Label: Windham Hill; Dancing Cat; Valley Entertainment (rerelease)
- Producer: Howard Johnston; Cathy Econom; George Winston

George Winston chronology
Linus and Lucy: The Music of Vince Guaraldi (1996)	Plains (1999)	Remembrance: A Memorial Benefit (2001)

Professional ratings
Review scores
Source	Rating
AllMusic	4/5 stars

Plains is the 11th album of pianist George Winston and eighth solo piano album, released in 1999. It was his first studio album consisting of original compositions since 1994's Forest. According to Winston, "this album is inspired by the plains and its people. The four seasons there have always been my deepest source of inspiration."

The album was certified Gold by the RIAA on January 12, 2000. It was reissued in 2013 by Valley Entertainment with Dancing Cat Records. The reissue was packaged in a Digipak and features revised cover art.

== Track listing ==
All tracks are written by George Winston, except where noted.

No.	Title	Writer(s)	Length
1.	"Dubuque"	Traditional; arr. by George Winston	2:27
2.	"Before Barbed Wire"	Philip Aaberg	4:19
3.	"Frangenti"	Massimo Gatti	3:51
4.	"Give Me Your Hand/La Valse Pour Les Petites Jeunes Filles"	Traditional Irish; arr. by George Winston	2:41
5.	"No Ke Ano Ahiahi (In the Evening Time)"	Traditional Hawaiian; arr. by George Winston	5:12
6.	"Graduation"		1:47
7.	"Teach Me Tonight"	Gene de Paul, Sammy Cahn	4:13
8.	"Rainsong (Fortune's Lullaby)"		4:41
9.	"Merry Go Round"	Traditional; arr. by George Winston	3:23
10.	"The Dance"	Tony Arata	4:52
11.	"Cloudburst"		3:10
12.	"The Swan"	Angelo Badalamenti	6:14
13.	"ʻIke Ia Ladana (Queen's Jubilee)"	Queen Liliʻuokalani	6:39
14.	"Plains (Eastern Montana Blues)"		3:49
15.	"Angel"	Sarah McLachlan	6:33
16.	"Waltz for the Lonely"	Chet Atkins, Charles Randolph Goodrum	3:17
17.	"Sase (Sassy)"	Joseph Kokolia	2:10
18.	"Muliwai"	Charles Pokipala	2:41
Total length:			72:49
