= Summer (George Winston album) =

Studio album by George Winston
- Released: 1991
- Recorded: 1991
- Genre: Folk; ambient; new age
- Length: 57:10
- Label: Windham Hill, Dancing Cat
- Producer: Howard Johnston, Cathy Econom, and George Winston

George Winston chronology
The Velveteen Rabbit (1984)	Summer (1991)	Forest (1994)

Alternative cover
- Special edition

Professional ratings
Review scores
Source	Rating
Allmusic	3/5 stars

Summer is the sixth album of pianist George Winston and his fifth solo piano album, released in 1991. It was reissued on Dancing Cat Records in 2008.

The album was certified Gold by the RIAA on January 15, 1992.

== Track listing ==
All tracks are written by George Winston, except where noted.

No.	Title	Writer(s)	Length
1.	"Living in the Country"	Pete Seeger	3:51
2.	"Loreta and Desirée's Bouquet" (Part 1)		4:04
3.	"Loreta and Desirée's Bouquet" (Part 2)		3:28
4.	"Fragrant Fields"	Art Lande	4:01
5.	"The Garden"	Dominic Frontiere	3:07
6.	"Spring Creek"	Philip Aaberg	4:08
7.	"Lullaby"	Steve Fergeson	3:25
8.	"The Black Stallion"	Carmine Coppola	3:49
9.	"Hummingbird"		5:07
10.	"Early Morning Range"		2:59
11.	"Living Without You"	Randy Newman	6:01
12.	"Goodbye, Montana" (Part 1)		2:14
13.	"Corrina, Corrina"	Traditional; arr. by George Winston	4:24
14.	"Goodbye, Montana" (Part 2)		3:11
15.	"Where Are You Now"		3:36
Total length:			57:10

== Charts ==
Chart (1991)	Peak position
US Billboard 200	55
