= The Velveteen Rabbit (album) =

Soundtrack album by George Winston, Meryl Streep
- Released: 1985
- Genre: Children; ambient; new age
- Length: 32:28
- Label: Windham Hill/Dancing Cat, Rabbit Ears, Sony DVD (rerelease)
- Producer: Clay Stites, Mark Sottnick

George Winston chronology
December (1982)	The Velveteen Rabbit (1985)	Summer (1991)

Professional ratings
Review scores
Source	Rating
Allmusic	5/5 stars

The Velveteen Rabbit is an album by pianist George Winston and actress Meryl Streep, released in 1985. The 1922 story by Margery Williams, The Velveteen Rabbit, is narrated by Streep accompanied by Winston's piano pieces, which also appear without narration. The album was produced by Mark Sottnick and Clay Stites.

== Track listing ==
All songs by George Winston

=== Narration and music ===
1. "The Velveteen Rabbit" (Piano Solo) – 1:00
2. "Christmas" – 1:47
3. "The Toys" – 1:35
4. "The Skin Horse" – 2:52
5. "Nana" – 0:30
6. "Lullaby" – 2:54
7. "Spring" – 2:27
8. "Summer" – 1:19
9. "The Rabbit Dance" – 3:04
10. "Alone" (Piano Solo) – 1:01
11. "Shabbiness Doesn't Matter" – 1:35
12. "Anxious Moments" – 2:20
13. "The Fairy" – 3:38
14. "Flying" – 2:29
15. "Returning" – 1:18
16. "The Velveteen Rabbit" (Piano Solo) – 2:39

=== Piano solos without narration ===
1. "The Velveteen Rabbit" - 1:00
2. "Christmas" - 1:46
3. "The Toys" - 1:35
4. "The Skin Horse" - 0:51
5. "This Magic Called Real" - 0:31
6. "Lullaby (Sandman)" - 2:54
7. "Spring (The Velveteen Rabbit)" - 2:27
8. "Summer" - 1:19
9. "Summer Evening" - 0:49
10. "The Rabbit Dance" - 1:08
11. "Alone" - 1:08
12. "Shabbiness Doesn't Matter" - 1:09
13. "Anxious Moments--Part 1" - 1:20
14. "Loneliness" - 2:22
15. "Anxious Moments--Part 2/The Fairy - 0:50
16. "Flying" - 2:31
17. "Returning/The Velveteen Rabbit" - 4:00
18. BONUS TRACK: "Night Thoughts" - 4:33

== Personnel ==
- George Winston – piano
- Meryl Streep – narration

== Charts ==
Chart (1985)	Peak position
US Billboard 200	180
