= Night Divides the Day: The Music of the Doors =

Studio album by George Winston
- Released: October 8, 2002
- Recorded: 2002
- Genre: Rock; ambient; new age
- Length: 66:12
- Label: Windham Hill, Dancing Cat
- Producer: George Winston, Howard Johnson and Cathy Econom

George Winston chronology
Remembrance: A Memorial Benefit (2001)	Night Divides the Day: The Music of the Doors (2002)	Montana: A Love Story (2004)

Professional ratings
Review scores
Source	Rating
Allmusic	4/5 stars

Night Divides the Day: The Music of the Doors is the thirteenth album of pianist George Winston and ninth solo piano album, released in 2002. It features only piano covers of rock band The Doors. The Doors' keyboard player Ray Manzarek stated: "I love this CD; George has captured the essence of the Doors and added his own unique voice". The name of the album comes from the line "Night divides the day", from The Doors' song "Break on Through (To the Other Side)". Rhapsody praised the album, calling it one of their favorite cover albums.

== Track listing ==
No.	Title	Writer(s)	Length
1.	"Spanish Caravan"	Jim Morrison, Ray Manzarek, Robby Krieger, John Densmore	5:28
2.	"The Crystal Ship"	Jim Morrison	5:11
3.	"People Are Strange"	Jim Morrison, Robby Krieger	3:24
4.	"Love Street"	Jim Morrison	4:16
5.	"Love Me Two Times"	Robby Krieger	3:10
6.	"Love Her Madly"	Robby Krieger	4:32
7.	"Wishful, Sinful"	Robby Krieger	3:50
8.	"Light My Fire"	Jim Morrison, Ray Manzarek, Robby Krieger, John Densmore	9:55
9.	"My Wild Love"	Jim Morrison, Ray Manzarek, Robby Krieger, John Densmore	6:08
10.	"Summer's Almost Gone"	Jim Morrison, Ray Manzarek, Robby Krieger, John Densmore	5:32
11.	"I Can't See Your Face in My Mind"	Jim Morrison, Ray Manzarek, Robby Krieger, John Densmore	4:14
12.	"Riders on the Storm"	Jim Morrison, Ray Manzarek, Robby Krieger, John Densmore	7:52
13.	"Bird of Prey"	Jim Morrison	3:00
Total length:			66:12

== Charts ==
Chart (2002)	Peak position
US Billboard 200	91
