= Piano Solos (George Winston album) =

Studio album by George Winston
- Released: 1973
- Recorded: November 1972, June 1973
- Studio: United Recording Studios, Hollywood, California
- Genre: Folk; blues; ragtime
- Length: 33:50; 57:47 (2006 reissue)
- Label: Takoma (1972 release); Windham Hill (1981 reissue); Dancing Cat (1994, 2006 CD releases)
- Producer: John Fahey; Doug Decker

George Winston chronology
Piano Solos (1973)	Autumn (1980)

Alternate cover
- Dancing Cat 1994 CD release cover art

Professional ratings
Review scores
Source	Rating
Allmusic	2/5 stars

Piano Solos is the debut album by American pianist George Winston. It features his first compositions and covers. American guitarist John Fahey co-produced the album with Doug Decker, who engineered it.

First released in 1973 on Takoma Records, it was reissued in 1981 by Windham Hill Records as Ballads and Blues 1972. It was released on CD in 1994 by Winston's Dancing Cat label, with a remastered release on October 5, 2006, along with five bonus tracks.

== Track listing ==
All tracks are written by George Winston, except where noted.

Original 1972 release
No.	Title	Writer(s)	Length
1.	"Deland, Florida Medley: Highway Hymn Blues"		3:00
2.	"Deland, Florida Medley: Song"		3:20
3.	"Deland, Florida Medley: Go 'Way From My Window"	John Jacob Niles	1:30
4.	"Deland, Florida Medley: The Woods East of Deland"		2:58
5.	"Brenda's Blues"	John Fahey	1:44
6.	"Miles City Train"		5:59
7.	"New Hope Blues"		1:40
8.	"Theme for a Futuristic Movie"	Michael S. Roth	1:55
9.	"Rag"		5:55
10.	Untitled		5:49
Total length:			33:50

2006 Reissue Bonus Tracks
No.	Title	Writer(s)	Length
11.	"Blues in G"		3:48
12.	"You Don't Love Me"	Bo Diddley	4:48
13.	"Elcina's Grandmother's Rag"		3:20
14.	"Variations on Song for Kurt"	Alan Kilmartin	8:07
15.	"Bright Light Waltz"		3:54
Total length:			57:47
