= Remembrance: A Memorial Benefit =

Studio album by George Winston
- Released: November 19, 2001
- Recorded: September 16–17, 2001
- Genre: Folk; ambient; new age
- Length: 31:10
- Label: Windham Hill, Dancing Cat
- Producer: Howard Johnston, Cathy Econom, and George Winston

George Winston chronology
Plains (1999)	Remembrance: A Memorial Benefit (2001)	Night Divides the Day: The Music of the Doors (2002)

Professional ratings
Review scores
Source	Rating
Allmusic	3/5 stars

Remembrance: A Memorial Benefit is the twelfth album of pianist George Winston, released in 2001. All money earned with this album was donated to benefit funds to help the ones who had lost their beloved ones in the September 11, 2001 attacks. It features Winston performing on piano, acoustic guitar and harmonica.

== Track listing ==
All music is composed by George Winston, except where noted.

No.	Title	Writer(s)	Instrument	Length
1.	"Lament"		Piano	2:26
2.	"Where Are You Now"		Acoustic guitar	4:09
3.	"Remembrance"		Piano	3:55
4.	"Where the Sun Rises First (Kumakahi)"	Moses Kahumoku; George Kahumoku Jr.	Acoustic guitar	5:11
5.	"Farewell Medley"	Traditional; arr. by George Winston	Harmonica	8:55
6.	"Daughters and Sons"	Ke'ala Kwan	Acoustic guitar	4:31
7.	"Lullaby 2"		Piano	† 2:03
Total length:				31:10

† = bonus track
