= Gulf Coast Blues and Impressions 2: A Louisiana Wetlands Benefit =

Gulf Coast Blues and Impressions 2: A Louisiana Wetlands Benefitfit

Studio album by George Winston
- Released: March 20, 2012
- Recorded: 2012
- Genre: Blues; jazz; ambient; new age
- Length: 56:12
- Label: RCA; Dancing Cat
- Producer: George Winston

George Winston chronology
Love Will Come: The Music of Vince Guaraldi, Volume 2 (2010)	Gulf Coast Blues and Impressions 2: A Louisiana Wetlands Benefitfit (2012)	Harmonica Solos (2013)

Professional ratings
Review scores
Source	Rating
Allmusic	4/5 stars

Gulf Coast Blues and Impressions 2: A Louisiana Wetlands Benefit is the thirteenth album of pianist George Winston, also his thirteenth solo piano album, released in 2012. It is his third benefit release, made as a fundraiser for the Louisiana Wetlands. The album furthers the benefit work to help victims of the 2005 Hurricane Katrina disaster that began with fundraising efforts from his Gulf Coast Blues and Impressions: A Hurricane Relief Benefit CD released in 2006.

== Track listing ==
All music is composed by George Winston, except where noted.

No.	Title	Writer(s)	Length
1.	"New Orleans Shall Rise Again #7 (Are the Levees Shored Up In America?)"	George Winston; Henry Butler	4:52
2.	"Pixie #6 in E Minor (Gobajie)"		3:28
3.	"Kindred Spirit"	George Winston; Shad Weathersby	3:48
4.	"Elements"	Michael Barry-Rec	6:14
5.	"Fanning the Flames"	Jon Cleary	6:03
6.	"The Gulf Will Live Again #1"		3:58
7.	"Georgianna"	Dr. John	6:44
8.	"The Cries of the Wetlands 1"		3:23
9.	"The Cries of the Wetlands 2"		3:47
10.	"New Orleans Slow Dance"		3:49
11.	"An African in the Americas"	George Winston; Dr. Ysaye Maria Barnwell	10:07
Total length:			56:12
