= December (George Winston album) =

Studio album by George Winston
- Released: 1982
- Recorded: September/October 1982
- Studio: Different Fur, San Francisco, California
- Genre: Folk; ambient; new age; Christmas
- Length: 38:54; 45:25 (20th Anniversary Edition)
- Label: Windham Hill, Dancing Cat (rerelease)
- Producer: William Ackerman; George Winston

George Winston chronology
Winter into Spring (1982)	December (1982)	The Velveteen Rabbit (1984)

Alternate cover
- 2013 CD Digipak reissue

Professional ratings
Review scores
Source	Rating
AllMusic	5/5 stars

December is the fourth solo piano album from George Winston. It was recorded during the fall of 1982 and was released at the end of the year. It is a Christmas album, and more generally a tribute to the winter season. The album is a follow-up to Winter into Spring from earlier in 1982.

December is Winston's highest-selling album, having been certified triple Platinum by the RIAA, signifying 3 million copies in shipment. The success of the album, along with several of Winston's other albums from the early 1980s, enabled the record label, Windham Hill, to get international distribution and a higher profile. The album also spent 178 weeks on the Billboard 200, reaching a peak of No. 54 in January 1984, over a year after its original release. In 1987, five years after its release, it reached No. 2 on Billboard's Top Holiday Albums chart.

A 20th Anniversary Edition of the album, with two bonus tracks, was released in 2001. The album was again reissued in 2013 by Valley Entertainment with Dancing Cat Records, Winston's own label. This reissue was packaged in a Digipak and features revised cover art.

== Critical reception ==
AllMusic critic William Ruhlmann commented that December ranks as "the mother of all solo instrumental albums, and with good reason. Mixing traditional carols with Pachelbel's Canon and a few originals, Winston produces a solo piano album of unparalleled—and undeniable—beauty. How can music be simultaneously stirring and soothing, relaxed yet exalted? Millions have found the answer here, and an industry has spent decades trying to duplicate it."

== Track listing ==
All tracks are written by George Winston, except where noted.

Side One
No.	Title	Writer(s)	Liner notes by Winston	Length
1.	"Thanksgiving"		Inspired by friends and places of Miles City, Montana	4:04
2.	"Jesus, Jesus, Rest Your Head"	John Jacob Niles	Originally an Appalachian carol of the late 1800s	2:40
3.	"Joy"	J. S. Bach, arr. by David Qualey	Inspired by an arrangement by guitarist David Qualey	3:13
4.	"Prelude"		Inspired by American Peanuts jazz pianist Vince Guaraldi	1:16
5.	"Carol of the Bells"	M. D. Leontovych; arr. by George Winston		3:56
6.	"Night, Part One: Snow"			1:51
7.	"Night, Part Two: Midnight"			1:56
8.	"Night, Part Three: Minstrels"	Malcolm Dalglish	Inspired by St. Basil's Hymn, a traditional Greek children's New Year's carol based upon a rendition by American hammered dulcimer player Malcolm Dalglish, from his album Thunderhead (1982)	2:00

Side Two
No.	Title	Writer(s)	Liner notes by Winston	Length
9.	"Variations on the Kanon by Johann Pachelbel"	Johann Pachelbel; arr. by George Winston		5:21
10.	"The Holly and the Ivy"	Traditional; arr. by George Winston		4:52
11.	"Some Children See Him"	Alfred S. Burt	One of 15 carols Burt wrote as gifts for friends. The piece was originally a song with lyrics by Wilha Hutson.	3:43
12.	"Peace"			4:02
Total length:				38:54

20th Anniversary Edition bonus tracks
No.	Title	Writer(s)	Length
13.	"A Christmas Song"	John Barry	2:25
14.	"Sleep Baby Mine"	Alfred S. Burt	4:06
Total length:			45:25

== Personnel ==
Credits adapted from 1982 vinyl liner notes.

- George Winston — piano

Additional

- Anne Ackerman, William Ackerman — cover design
- Karen Kirsch, Steven Miller — sound engineers
- Jack Hunt — mastering
- Greg Edmonds — photography

== Chart ==
Chart (1984–87)	Peak position
New Zealand Albums (RMNZ)	49
US Billboard 200	54
US Top Holiday Albums (Billboard)	2
US Top Jazz Albums (Billboard)	5

== Certifications ==
Region	Certification	Certified units/sales
Canada (Music Canada)	Gold	50,000^{^}
United States (RIAA)	3× Platinum	3,000,000^{^}
^{^} Shipments figures based on certification alone.
