= Winter into Spring =

Studio album by George Winston
- Released: 1982
- Recorded: March 1982
- Genre: Folk; ambient; new age
- Length: 43:45
- Label: Windham Hill, Dancing Cat (rerelease)
- Producer: William Ackerman

George Winston chronology
Autumn (1980)	Winter into Spring (1982)	December (1982)

Professional ratings
Review scores
Source	Rating
AllMusic	3/5 stars
The Rolling Stone Album Guide	2/5 stars

Winter into Spring is the third solo album of pianist George Winston, released in 1982. It was inspired by the transition of the seasons and was the follow-up to his 1980 album, Autumn. It was reissued on Winston's Dancing Cat label. The album was certified Platinum by the RIAA on December 17, 1987.

== Track listing ==
All music is composed by George Winston, except "O Mar", by Dorival Caymmi.

No.	Title	Length
1.	"January Stars"	6:32
2.	"February Sea"	5:15
3.	"Ocean Waves (O Mar)" ("O Mar" is Portuguese for "The Sea")	7:08
4.	"Reflection"	2:40
5.	"Rain" (Originally "Rain/Dance")	10:05
6.	"Blossom/Meadow"	4:13
7.	"The Venice Dreamer Part One - Introduction"	2:19
8.	"The Venice Dreamer Part Two"	5:46

2001 reissue bonus track
No.	Title	Length
1.	"(Love Echoes in the) Pine Hills"	4:06

== Charts ==
Chart (1984–85)	Peak position
US Billboard 200	127
US Top Jazz Albums (Billboard)	14
