= Sadako and the Thousand Paper Cranes (album) =

Soundtrack album by George Winston, Liv Ullmann
- Released: 1990
- Genre: Children; ambient; new age
- Length: 58:28
- Label: Windham Hill, Dancing Cat, Sony
- Producer: George Levenson, Howard Johnston, George Winston

George Winston chronology
Forest (1994)	Sadako and the Thousand Paper Cranes (1990)	Linus and Lucy: The Music of Vince Guaraldi (1996)

Professional ratings
Review scores
Source	Rating
Allmusic	3.5/5 stars

Sadako and the Thousand Paper Cranes is an album by musician George Winston with narration by actress Liv Ullmann, released in 1995. It comprises the soundtrack of the 1991 film of the same name, based on the 1977 book of the same name.

== Description ==
The music is the soundtrack of the 1991 short film Sadako and the Thousand Paper Cranes, based on the 1977 book of the same name, directed by George Levenson and co-written by the book author Eleanor Coerr and Levenson. Liv Ullmann narrates the story. The album was released in 1995, produced by Levenson, Winston, and Howard Johnston.

Winston's guitar solos also appear apart from the narration, which follows the true story of Sadako Sasaki, a victim of Hiroshima bombing. Suffering from radiation-induced leukemia, Sadako spent her time in a hospital folding origami paper cranes hoping to make a thousand of them and thereby receiving a wish, one she would use to heal and live.

== Track listing ==
All songs by George Winston unless otherwise noted.

=== Narration with solo guitar ===
1. "Introduction/Transformation/Early One Morning/Running/Peace Park" – 3:51
2. "Bells/Birds in Flight/Grandmother's Lament" – 1:39
3. "The Race/Sadako's Lament/A New Year's Lullaby/Sadako's Lament II" (John Creger, Winston) – 5:28
4. "A Good Luck Sign/The Magic of the Cranes/Folding Cranes" – 3:46
5. "Meeting Kenji/Mon Enfant/Kenji's Lament/Star Island" – 4:27
6. "Going Home/A Silk Kimono/Sadako's Lament III" – 6:02
7. "This Is Our Cry/Epilogue" – 5:05

=== Solo guitar music only ===
1. "Introduction/Transformation" – 46
2. "Early One Morning (Sadako's Slack Key #1)" – 1:35
3. "Running/Peace Park" – :54
4. "Bells" – :18
5. "Birds in Flight" (Traditional) – 2:07
6. "Grandmother's Lament" – 48
7. "The Race/Sadako's Lament" – 1:52
8. "A New Year's Lullaby" (John Creger) – :59
9. "Sadako's Lament II" – 1:24
10. "A Good Luck Sign" – :49
11. "The Magic of the Cranes" – :53
12. "Folding Cranes" – 1:07
13. "Meeting Kenji" – 2:14
14. "Mon Enfant/Kenji's Lament/Star Island" (Traditional, Winston) – 3:11
15. "Going Home" – 1:22
16. "A Silk Kimono" – 1:16
17. "Sadako's Lament III" – 2:07
18. "This Is Our Cry" – 1:47
19. "Epilogue (Sadako's Slack Key #2)" – 2:41

== Personnel ==
- George Winston – piano, guitar
- Liv Ullmann – narration

== See also ==
- Sadako and the Thousand Paper Cranes
