= Spring Carousel: A Cancer Research Benefit =

Studio album by George Winston
- Released: March 31, 2017
- Recorded: 2013–2015
- Genre: Folk; ambient; new age
- Length: 53:48
- Label: RCA, Dancing Cat
- Producer: George Winston; Howard Johnston; Cathy Econom

George Winston chronology
Harmonica Solos (2013)	Spring Carousel: A Cancer Research Benefit (2017)	Restless Wind (2019)

Professional ratings
Review scores
Source	Rating
AllMusic	3.5/5 stars

Spring Carousel: A Cancer Research Benefit is the 18th album by pianist George Winston and 14th solo piano album, released on March 31, 2017. While recuperating from myelodysplastic syndrome, Winston practiced the piano in the City of Hope Hospital auditorium, creating many 21 "kind of circular" pieces, 15 of which ended up on Spring Carousel: A Cancer Research Benefit. Proceeds benefit City of Hope Hospital near Los Angeles.

== Track listing ==
All tracks are written by George Winston.

No.	Title	Length
1.	"Carousel 1"	0:39
2.	"Carousel 2"	1:49
3.	"Soft Muted Dream"	2:59
4.	"More Than You Know"	3:45
5.	"Many Clocks"	5:49
6.	"Ms. Mystery 1"	5:34
7.	"Unrequited Love"	1:41
8.	"Dream 2"	2:06
9.	"Night Blooming/Carousel 16"	4:24
10.	"Fess' Carousels"	5:03
11.	"Ms. Mystery 2"	4:55
12.	"Pixie #13 In C (Gôbajie)"	5:56
13.	"Ms. Mystery 3"	3:07
14.	"Rekindled Love"	2:31
15.	"Requited Love"	3:11
Total length:		53:48

Track 12, "Pixie #13 In C (Gôbajie)", originally appeared on Gulf Coast Blues and Impressions: A Hurricane Relief Benefit.

== Charts ==
Chart (2017)	Peak position
US Jazz Albums (Billboard)	1
US New Age Albums (Billboard)	1
