= Linus and Lucy: The Music of Vince Guaraldi =

Studio album by George Winston
- Released: September 17, 1996
- Recorded: 1996
- Genres: Jazz; ambient; new age
- Length: 59:48
- Labels: Windham Hill, Dancing Cat
- Producers: George Winston, Howard Johnston & Cathy Econom

George Winston chronology
Sadako and the Thousand Paper Cranes (1995)	Linus and Lucy: The Music of Vince Guaraldi (1996)	Plains (1999)

Professional ratings
Review scores
Source	Rating
AllMusic	4.5/5 stars
Entertainment Weekly	C+

Linus and Lucy: The Music of Vince Guaraldi is the tenth album by pianist George Winston, released in 1996. It features covers of songs composed by jazz pianist Vince Guaraldi, including several written for the Peanuts animated television specials. It was reissued on Dancing Cat Records in 2008. The album was certified Gold by the RIAA on November 19, 1996.

Winston released a second volume of Guaraldi compositions in 2010, entitled Love Will Come: The Music of Vince Guaraldi, Volume 2. A third volume, entitled Count the Ways: The Music of Vince Guaraldi, Volume 3, remains unreleased.

== Track listing ==
All tracks are written by Vince Guaraldi, except where noted.

No.	Title	Writer(s)	Original release	Length
1.	"Cast Your Fate to the Wind"		Jazz Impressions of Black Orpheus (1962)	6:23
2.	"Skating"		A Charlie Brown Christmas (1965)	3:02
3.	"Linus and Lucy"		Jazz Impressions of A Boy Named Charlie Brown (1964)	3:15
4.	"The Great Pumpkin Waltz"		It's the Great Pumpkin, Charlie Brown: Original Soundtrack Recording (2022)	3:56
5.	"Monterey"		Vince Guaraldi with the San Francisco Boys Chorus (1967)	4:33
6.	"A Charlie Brown Thanksgiving" (aka "Thanksgiving Theme")		A Charlie Brown Thanksgiving: Original Soundtrack Recording (2023)	2:29
7.	"Treat Street"		The Latin Side of Vince Guaraldi (1964)	4:51
8.	"Eight Five Five" (unused music cue originally titled "Kite Animation Theme")		Charlie Brown and Charles Schulz (1969) †	1:22
9.	"The Masked Marvel"		Alma-Ville (1969)	5:36
10.	"Charlie Brown and His All-Stars"		A Boy Named Charlie Brown: Original Motion Picture Soundtrack (2017)	1:54
11.	"You're in Love, Charlie Brown"		Oh Good Grief! (1968)	1:46
12.	"Peppermint Patty"		Vince Guaraldi with the San Francisco Boys Chorus	3:40
13.	"Bon Voyage"		It Was a Short Summer, Charlie Brown: Original Soundtrack Recording (2024)	1:46
14.	"Young Man's Fancy"		It's Arbor Day, Charlie Brown: Original Soundtrack Recording (2026)	3:52
15.	"Remembrance"		At Grace Cathedral (1965)	2:20
16.	"Theme to Grace"/"Lament"	Vince Guaraldi/George Winston	At Grace Cathedral	5:02
Total length:				59:48

† = denotes song has not been commercially released; featured in Peanuts television special only
