= Harmonica Solos =

Studio album by George Winston
- Released: 2012
- Genre: Appalachian; folk
- Length: 56:42
- Label: Dancing Cat
- Producer: Howard Johnston; Lyman Miller; Tyler Crowder; Bruce Olsen; Adrian Olsen; Mike Weix

George Winston chronology
Gulf Coast Blues and Impressions 2: A Louisiana Wetlands Benefit (2012)	Harmonica Solos (2012)	Spring Carousel: A Cancer Research Benefit (2017)

Harmonica Solos is an album by musician George Winston of many different harmonica songs, both originals and covers, that was recorded from 1996 to 2005 and released in 2012. Winston plays all the harmonica on the album.

== Track listing ==
=== Studio Recordings: 1996-2005 ===
All music is composed by George Winston, except where noted.

No.	Title	Writer(s)	Length
1.	"M.M.'s Dunk"		2:02
2.	"Steamboat Gwine 'Round De Bend"	John Fahey	2:09
3.	"Hey Diddle Dis"	Traditional (English)	1:24
4.	"Snow on the Ballfield"		2:49
5.	"Maris Farewell"		2:42
6.	"Mantle's Farewell"		3:06
7.	"Variations on Rabbe Elimelech"	Traditional (Yiddish)	2:37
8.	"Sally Goodin'"	Traditional (American)	2:44
9.	"Sussex Carol"	Traditional (English)	2:16
10.	"Farewell Medley: Farewell to Taiwaithe/Kindess Emerging/My Country ‘Tis of Thee/Taps"	Traditional (Scottish)/George Winston/Samuel Francis Smith/: Daniel Butterfield; Oliver Norton	8:57

=== Live in Bozeman, Montana 8-31-05 ===
No.	Title	Writer(s)	Length
11.	"Dialogue"		1:03
12.	"Haste to the Wedding"	Traditional (Irish); arr. Sam Hinton	1:03
13.	"Dialogue"		0:25
14.	"Sweet Bunch of Daisies"		3:11
15.	"Cold Frosty Morning"	Traditional (American)	2:37
16.	"The Glendy Burk"/"Farewell to Whiskey"	Stephen Foster/Traditional (Irish)	3:10
17.	"Off to California"	Traditional (Irish)	2:58
18.	"Dialogue"		1:02
19.	"Going Upstairs"/"Princess Royale"	Traditional (Irish)/Traditional (English) Morris dance	3:22
20.	"Derentwater's Farewell"/"Shrimp Tails Up the Water"	Traditional (Irish)	4:55
Total length:			56:42

== Personnel ==
- George Winston – harmonica
