= Liz Story =

American pianist

- Born: October 28, 1950 (age 75); San Diego, California, U.S.
- Genres: New-age; Jazz
- Occupations: Musician, composer
- Instrument: Piano
- Years active: 1983–present
- Labels: Windham Hill, Novus, DMI
- Website: www.lizstory.com

Liz Story is an American pianist. Often characterized as a New-Age musician, her works resemble a combination of jazz and classical music.

== Early years ==
Born in San Diego, California, Story played classical music as a child. She studied at Juilliard School and Hunter College. After hearing pianist Bill Evans perform at a club in New York City, she studied jazz piano with Sanford Gold, whom Evans recommended. Story then studied music at University of California in Los Angeles and the Dick Grove Music Workshops.

== Professional musician ==
Between 1983 and 2005, Story released ten full-length record albums, including two albums of jazz standards. William Ackerman of Windham Hill Records signed her to his label in 1983. Often compared to George Winston, another Windham Hill artist, her early solo piano recordings found favor with New-Age music listeners.

A 1986 solo performance at New York music venue The Bottom Line garnered a favorable review from noted music critic Stephen Holden, who praised her technique and ability to "give each song a scrupulous sense of compositional unity."

Story composed and performed the songs "Forgiveness" and "Worth Winning" for the 1989 film Worth Winning. Her hands were used in the film to simulate the piano playing by actress Madeline Stowe.

== Career interrupted ==
Story experienced a hemorrhage of the brain during a performance in 2019, necessitating a recovery period to re-learn how to play her music. By 2023 she returned to performing, including events at Carnegie Hall and The Kennedy Center.

== Discography ==
- Solid Colors (Windham Hill, 1983)
- Unaccountable Effect (Windham Hill, 1985)
- Part of Fortune (Jive/Novus, 1988)
- Speechless (Jive/Novus, 1989)
- Escape of the Circus Ponies (Windham Hill, 1990)
- My Foolish Heart (Windham Hill, 1992)
- The Gift (Windham Hill, 1994)
- Liz Story (Windham Hill, 1996)
- 17 Seconds to Anywhere (Windham Hill, 1998)
- Night Sky Essays (DMI, 2005)
