= Restless Wind =

Studio album by George Winston
- Released: May 3, 2019
- Recorded: 2018
- Genre: R&B; rock; ambient; new age
- Length: 52:56
- Label: RCA; Dancing Cat
- Producer: George Winston, Howard Johnston, Cathy Econom

George Winston chronology
| Spring Carousel: A Cancer Research Benefit (2017) | Restless Wind (2019) | Night (2022) |

Professional ratings
Review scores
| Source | Rating |
|---|---|
| AllMusic | 4.5/5 stars |

Restless Wind is the 19th album by pianist George Winston and 15th solo piano album, released on May 3, 2019. The eleven-song collection includes his interpretations of music by Sam Cooke, The Doors, Stephen Stills, George and Ira Gershwin and Country Joe McDonald.

== Track listing ==
| No. | Title | Writer(s) | Length |
|---|---|---|---|
| 1. | "Autumn Wind (Pixie 11)" | George Winston | 5:00 |
| 2. | "Judge, Judge" | George Brooks | 5:02 |
| 3. | "A Change Is Gonna Come" | Sam Cooke | 5:03 |
| 4. | "Summertime" | George Gershwin; Ira Gershwin; DuBose Heyward | 5:38 |
| 5. | "Canción Mixteca (Immigrant's Lament)" | Jose Lopez Alvavez | 4:19 |
| 6. | "The Good Earth" | Jimmy Wisner | 3:49 |
| 7. | "For What It's Worth" | Stephen Stills | 4:57 |
| 8. | "Medley: "Muskrat Ramble"/"I Feel Like I'm Fixin' To Die Rag"/"Stop the Bleeding" | Edward "Kid" Ory/Country Joe McDonald/George Winston | 7:03 |
| 9. | "The Times of Harvey Milk" | Mark Isham | 4:25 |
| 10. | "The Unknown Soldier (War Is Over)" | Jim Morrison; Ray Manzarek; Robby Krieger; John Densmore | 4:46 |
| 11. | "The Wayward Wind (The Restless Wind)" | Stanley Lebowsky; Herb Newman | 5:35 |
| Total length: | | | 52:56 |
