= Koujounotsuki =

Koujounotsuki may refer to:

- "Kōjō no Tsuki", a Japanese song from the Meiji period
- 8957 Koujounotsuki, an asteroid named after the song
