= Autumn (George Winston album) =

Studio album by George Winston
- Released: 1980
- Recorded: June 19–20, 1980
- Genre: Folk; ambient; new age
- Length: 46:38; 52:16 (20th Anniversary Edition)
- Label: Windham Hill; Dancing Cat (20th Anniversary release)
- Producer: William Ackerman

George Winston chronology
Piano Solos (1973)	Autumn (1980)	Winter into Spring (1982)

Professional ratings
Review scores
Source	Rating
Allmusic	5/5 stars

Autumn is the second solo piano album by pianist George Winston, released in 1980. It was re-issued in 2001 with a bonus track "Too Much Between Us" on the Dancing Cat label. The album was certified Platinum by the RIAA.

== Track listing ==
All music is composed by George Winston, except where noted.

September
No.	Title	Length
1.	"Colors/Dance"	10:25
2.	"Woods"	6:47
3.	"Longing/Love"	9:10

October
No.	Title	Length
4.	"Road"	4:14
5.	"Moon"	7:44
6.	"Sea"	2:42
7.	"Stars"	5:36
Total length:		46:38

=== 2001 20th Anniversary Edition ===
No.	Title	Writer(s)	Length
8.	"Too Much Between Us"	Gary Brooker, Keith Reid, Robin Trower	5:38
Total length:			52:16

== Charts ==
Chart (1985–89)	Peak position
US Billboard 200	139
US Top Jazz Albums (Billboard)	12
