= Damon Buxton =

American guitarist and composer

- Born: 1958 (age 67–68); La Mesa, California, U.S.
- Occupations: Guitarist, composer
- Years active: 2000s–present
- Notable work: Forgiving Dreams, Unbroken, Book of Ruth

Damon Buxton (born 1958) is an American guitarist and composer. His primary instrument is the six-string classical guitar. He uses silent spaces, open tunings, natural reverb, and double picking. His compositions draw on musical traditions of fingerstyle, classical, new age, and jazz. Buxton is a self-taught musician who began playing the guitar at age 21 and developed his trademark fingerpicking style. He currently lives in the Pittsburgh Pennsylvania area with his wife and two cats.

== Early life and education ==
Buxton was born in 1958 in La Mesa California. His father was a businessman who negotiated the manufacture of aircraft components in Naples, Italy, and played the Hammond organ and accordion. His mother was a homemaker and church singer. The two provided a musical foundation and example of music as underpinning to a satisfying life. A 1969 family trip to Italy cemented an interest in the classical arts with a global perspective. Buxton attended Cornish College of the Arts in Seattle, graduating with a Bachelor of Fine Arts degree.

== Career ==
=== Composing & Performing Style ===
Buxton employs a tempo and volume dynamic in his compositions preferring to let the sound of notes and chords ring out in a contemplative space to achieve a greater dynamic range. Zone Music Reporter reviewer Bill Binkelman places Buxton at the top tier of guitarists, calling him "A rare, unique visionary on the acoustic guitar." Damon Buxton is a Hannabach strings artist and has used their strings exclusively since 2006.

=== Forgiving Dreams and collaboration with William Ackerman ===
After initial success with a demo release, "Sketchbook One," Buxton established a recording collaboration with William Ackerman, Grammy award-winning founder of Windham Hill Records, who produced his 2007 release, "Forgiving Dreams." Of this recording, RJ Lannan of Zone Music Reporter wrote, "Like a writer who speaks volumes with a few words, Buxton's sparse style shouts to the rooftops that the musical voice you hear is one to be reckoned with." Lannon later compared Buxton's talents to his mentor's, saying, "His talent is equal to Ackerman's on many levels."

=== Recordings with Corin Nelsen ===
In 2010, Buxton began a separate collaboration with Corin Nelsen, house engineer and builder of the studio at Ackerman's Imaginary Road Studios. Nelsen designed an individual space to let Buxton record instruments with microphones placed close to the artist to deliver an experience much like the performer sitting in the room next to the listener as possible. Nelson continues to mix and master Buxton's releases.

This collaboration produced twelve additional recordings that leverage this technique.

=== Many Miles Music ===
Buxton founded the record label Many Miles Music to distribute his own releases and produce compilation works of similar artists in the New Age genre. Three compilation recordings sprang from this effort - Winter Gifts, Winter Gifts II, and Roads.

=== Other Collaborations ===
Buxton's piece "Unbroken" appears on the 2013 compilation The Best of Reviews New Age: The Guitar alongside works by guitarists Alex de Grassi and William Ackerman.

Buxton's 2011 "Unbroken" and "Book of Ruth" feature accompaniment by Paul Winter Consort cellist Eugene Friesen.

=== Notable Concerts ===
- Franklin Park Arts Center - 2024
- Tim Noah Thumbnail Theater - 2023
- Kirkland Performance Center with Heidi Ann Breyer - 2013
- Bastyr University Chapel - 2017
- Bastyr University Chapel - 2015

== Discography ==
- Sketchbook One - 2006
- Forgiving Dreams - 2007
- Rotation of Earth - 2010
- Winter Gifts: The Many Miles Music Artists - 2010
- Unbroken - 2012
- Winter Gifts II: The Many Miles Music Artists - 2012
- Visitations - 2013
- The Best of Reviews New Age: The Guitar - 2013
- Roads: The Many Miles Music Artists - 2014
- A Trick of Light - 2015
- Another Sunday Drive - 2017
- A Winter's Night - 2018
- The Golden Age - 2019
- Someday - 2020
- Love In The Time Of War - 2021
- Because I Love You - 2022
- Are We There Yet? - 2024
- Waterford - 2025
