= Love Will Come: The Music of Vince Guaraldi, Volume 2 =

Studio album by George Winston
- Released: February 2, 2010
- Recorded: 2009
- Genres: Jazz; ambient; new age
- Length: 71:18
- Labels: RCA, Dancing Cat
- Producers: George Winston, Howard Johnston and Cathy Econom

George Winston chronology
Gulf Coast Blues and Impressions: A Hurricane Relief Benefit (2006)	Love Will Come: The Music of Vince Guaraldi, Volume 2 (2010)	Gulf Coast Blues and Impressions 2: A Louisiana Wetlands Benefit (2012)

Professional ratings
Review scores
Source	Rating
Allmusic	4.5/5 stars

Love Will Come: The Music of Vince Guaraldi, Volume 2 is the 16th album by pianist George Winston and 12th solo piano album, released on February 2, 2010. The album is a follow-up to the well-received 1996 tribute album highlighting much of Guaraldi's Peanuts works, Linus and Lucy: The Music of Vince Guaraldi.

== Track listing ==
All songs composed by Vince Guaraldi except † = composed by George Winston; †† = composed by Vince Guaraldi, Lee Mendelson

No.	Title	Original album/television soundtrack	Length	Notes
1	"Time For Love"	There's No Time for Love, Charlie Brown (1973)	2:23	a.k.a. "There's No Time For Love, Charlie Brown"
2	"It Was a Short Summer, Charlie Brown"	It Was a Short Summer, Charlie Brown: Original Soundtrack Recording (2024)	2:10	
3	"Macedonia"/"Little David"	Little Band Big Jazz (1960)	4:48	medley of two songs Guaraldi recorded with The Conte Candoli All Stars
4	"Woodstock"	Vince Guaraldi and the Lost Cues from the Charlie Brown Television Specials, Volume 2 (2008)	4:11	medley of two songs from It's a Mystery, Charlie Brown (1974): "It's a Mystery, Charlie Brown" and "Cops and Robbers"
5	"Fenwyck's Farfel"/"Calling Dr. Funk"	Vince Guaraldi Trio (1956) Modern Music from San Francisco (1956)	3:33	
6	"Room at the Bottom"	A Flower Is a Lovesome Thing (1958)	3:40	a.k.a. "Like a Mighty Rose"
7	"Air Music"	Charlie Brown's Holiday Hits (1998)	2:39	a.k.a. "Surfin' Snoopy"
8	"Be My Valentine"	Be My Valentine, Charlie Brown: Original Soundtrack Recording (2025)	3:13	a.k.a. "Heartburn Waltz"
9	"You're Elected, Charlie Brown"/"Little Birdie"	You're Not Elected, Charlie Brown: Original Soundtrack Recording (2024) A Charlie Brown Thanksgiving: Original Soundtrack Recording (2023)	7:23	"You're Elected, Charlie Brown" a.k.a. "Incumbent Waltz"
10	"Brasilia"	The Latin Side of Vince Guaraldi (1964)	2:03	
11	"Jambo's (Casaba)"	Vince Guaraldi, Bola Sete and Friends (1964) Alma-Ville (1969)	4:53	
12	"Pebble Beach"/"Dolores Park"†	Jazz Impressions of A Boy Named Charlie Brown (1964)	4:18	
13	"Love Will Come"/"Slow Dance" †	You're in Love, Charlie Brown (1967) Short Summer... (2024)	4:17	
14	"Rain, Rain Go Away"	Oh Good Grief! (1968) The Charlie Brown Suite & Other Favorites (2003) It's Arbor Day, Charlie Brown/Charlie Brown's All Stars!: Original Soundtrack Recordings (2026)	4:19	
15	"Nobody Else"	The Eclectic Vince Guaraldi (1969)	5:04	
16	"Love Will Come 2"		2:48	unused music cue
17*	"Dilemma"	You're Not Elected... (2024)	3:02	
18*	"Seeds for Thought"/"Ballad for Oscar"†	It's Arbor Day, Charlie Brown/Charlie Brown's All Stars!: Original Soundtrack Recordings (2026)	2:33	
19*	"Christmas Time Is Here" ††	A Charlie Brown Christmas (1965)	4:06	

*denotes iTunes bonus track
