= Corin Nelsen =

Recording engineer and music producer

Corin Nelsen is a Grammy Award-winning recording engineer and music producer. He is best known for his work with William Ackerman, the Grammy award-winning founder of Windham Hill Records, and as chief engineer at Ackerman's Imaginary Road Studios in Vermont.

== Early career ==
Nelsen met William Ackerman in 1986 while working as a carpenter and building Ackerman's home in Vermont. Nelsen quickly helped coordinate and became assistant engineer for the recording of two Windham Hill Records albums that Ackerman was producing, Eugene Friesen and Scott Cossu's Reunion and Malcolm Dalglish's Jogging the Memory.

In 1991 Ackerman and Nelsen started designing and building Imaginary Road Studios, originally intended for work on Ackerman's own recordings and his spoken word label, Gang of Seven, formed after he sold his stake in Windham Hill. Together Ackerman and Nelsen developed an efficient process for editing various takes to create a truly optimized "best" basic track for an artist around which the music is built.

In 2000 Nelsen also became the Director of I-Media for Websound and Rock River Communications mastering music for branded CDs and custom internet radio players for some of the world's top brands such as Volkswagen, Polo, Eddie Bauer, Pottery Barn, and more.

== Grammy Award ==
Nelsen won a Grammy for his role as Co-Producer and Engineer on Ackerman's album Returning, in the category Best New Age Album Year 2004.

== Studio Design and Notable Recordings ==
Nelsen has also designed and built other recording studios of varying sizes and built acoustic treatments for several musician's home studios, including a studio for guitarist Damon Buxton.

In 2007 Nelsen worked with Bruce Swedien (Michael Jackson, Quincy Jones, Duke Ellington) co-mixing tracks on Jeff Oster's album True including "Saturn Calling" which featured recordings from NASA's Cassini space mission.

In 2010 Nelsen founded SynchroSonic Productions, which expanded operations in 2012 and his own studio in Bremen, ME.

Nelsen has also worked with the late Tom "T-Bone" Wolk, Tony Levin, Damon Buxton, Dana Cunningham, Marc Enfroy, Fiona Joy Hawkins, Lawrence Blatt, and others.
