= Night (George Winston album) =

Studio album by George Winston
- Released: May 6, 2022
- Recorded: 2021
- Studio: Trilogy Studios; Soundworks Studios
- Genre: Folk; ambient; new age
- Length: 52:36
- Label: RCA; Dancing Cat
- Producer: George Winston; Howard Johnston; Cathy Econom

George Winston chronology
Restless Wind (2019)	Night (2022)

Night is the 20th album by pianist George Winston, released in the U.S. on May 6, 2022, by RCA/Dancing Cat records. It reached number 16 on the Billboard Jazz Albums chart. It is the final album released during his lifetime, prior to his death in June 2023.

== Track listing ==
All tracks are written by George Winston except where noted.

No.	Title	Writer(s)	Length
1.	"Beverly"		3:13
2.	"Freedom for the Stallion"	Allen Toussaint	5:00
3.	"Blues for Richard Folsom"	John Creger	2:23
4.	"Hallelujah"	Leonard Cohen	5:28
5.	"Making a Way"	Roderick Taylor	1:48
6.	"He's a Runner"	Laura Nyro	5:16
7.	"Kai Forest"		2:45
8.	"Wahine Hololio"	Traditional (Hawaiian); arranged by George Winston	6:14
9.	"At Midnight"		4:21
10.	"Pua Sadinia (Not to Be Forgotten)"	David Nape	5:51
11.	"Dawn"		3:04
12.	"Hana (A Flower for Your Heart)"	Shoukichi Kina	7:11
Total length:			52:36
