= Silent Night: A Benefit Single for Feeding America =

Single by George Winston
- Released: 2013
- Recorded: 2013
- Genre: Jazz
- Label: Dancing Cat
- Producer(s): George Winston

"Silent Night: A Benefit for Feeding America" is a digital solo piano single released in December 2013 by the pianist George Winston. The proceeds from the single, which was inspired by Joseph Byrd's version from his 1975 album, A Christmas Yet to Come, and the playing of the New Orleans R&B pianist Professor Longhair, were donated to Feeding America, a nationwide network of food banks that feeds 37 million people.

== Track listing ==
#	Title	Length
1	"Silent Night: A Benefit Single for Feeding America"	4:45
