= Silvia Kohan =

Argentinian singer

- Born: March 23, 1948; Buenos Aires, Argentina
- Died: June 27, 2003 (aged 54); Los Angeles, California
- Occupation(s): Singer, songwriter

Silvia Beatriz Kohan (March 23, 1948 – June 27, 2003) was an Argentine-American singer and songwriter, based in California.

== Early life ==
Silvia Kohan was born in Buenos Aires, Argentina, the daughter of Sofia Kohan. Her family was Jewish, with Eastern European origins. The Kohan family moved to the United States in 1957. She and her sister Feliza were raised in Pasadena and Los Angeles. She attended Alexander Hamilton High School.

== Career ==
Kohan toured internationally with the musical production Up With People for five years in the 1960s. She performed in musicals Zorba the Freek (1971) and Misa del Mar (1972), at the Venice Free Theater. She also sang with the Los Angeles All-City Choir. She was a cabaret-style singer and songwriter who performed mainly in California, especially for LGBT, Jewish, and Latinx audiences. Her signature original song was "Fat Girl Blues". She released one album, Finally Real (Dancing Cat Records, 1984), produced by pianist George Winston. Critics appreciated her "strong, expressive voice" but considered the songs and arrangements to be "soulless and forgettable".

== Personal life and legacy ==
She died in 2003, from congestive heart failure, survived by her partner, Ruth. Her papers, including journals, scrapbooks, correspondence, photographs, costumes, and recordings, are part of the GLBT Historical Society's collections. She was the subject of Nomy Lamm's multimedia show (or "musical mind-meld with video documentation") at the GLBT Historical Society in 2010.
