= Forest (George Winston album) =

Studio album by George Winston
- Released: October 11, 1994
- Recorded: 1994
- Genres: Folk; ambient; new age
- Length: 45:48
- Labels: Windham Hill, Dancing Cat
- Producers: Howard Johnston, Cathy Econom, and George Winston

George Winston chronology
Summer (1991)	Forest (1994)	Sadako and the Thousand Paper Cranes (1995)

Professional ratings
Review scores
Source	Rating
Allmusic	3/5 stars

Forest is the seventh album of pianist George Winston and his sixth solo piano album, released in 1994. It was reissued on Dancing Cat Records in 2008. The album won the 1996 Grammy Award for Best New Age Album. The album was certified Gold by the RIAA on December 21, 1994.

The track "Japanese Music Box (Itsuki No Komoriuta)" is based on a traditional Japanese lullaby "Itsuki Lullaby" that comes from Itsuki in southern Japan.

== Track listing ==
All tracks are written by George Winston, except where noted.

No.	Title	Writer(s)	Length
1.	"Tamarack Pines"		5:49
2.	"Forbidden Forest"		2:32
3.	"Troubadour"	John Barry	1:56
4.	"The Cradle"	Larry Young (Khalid Yasin)	2:13
5.	"Cloudy This Morning"		2:43
6.	"Last Lullaby Here"		0:59
7.	"Mon Enfant (My Child)"	Traditional; arr. by George Winston	3:20
8.	"Returning"		0:40
9.	"Graceful Ghost"	William Bolcom	2:53
10.	"Walking in the Air"	Howard Blake	7:45
11.	"Building the Snowman"	Howard Blake	1:35
12.	"The Snowman's Music Box Dance"	Howard Blake	2:15
13.	"Love Song to a Ballerina"	Mark Isham	2:58
14.	"Lights in the Sky"		1:41
15.	"Japanese Music Box" ("Itsuki No Komoriuta")	Traditional Japanese	2:11
16.	"Night Sky"		2:56
Total length:			45:48

== Charts ==
Chart (1994)	Peak position
US Billboard 200	62
