= Kōjō no Tsuki =

Japanese Meiji period song

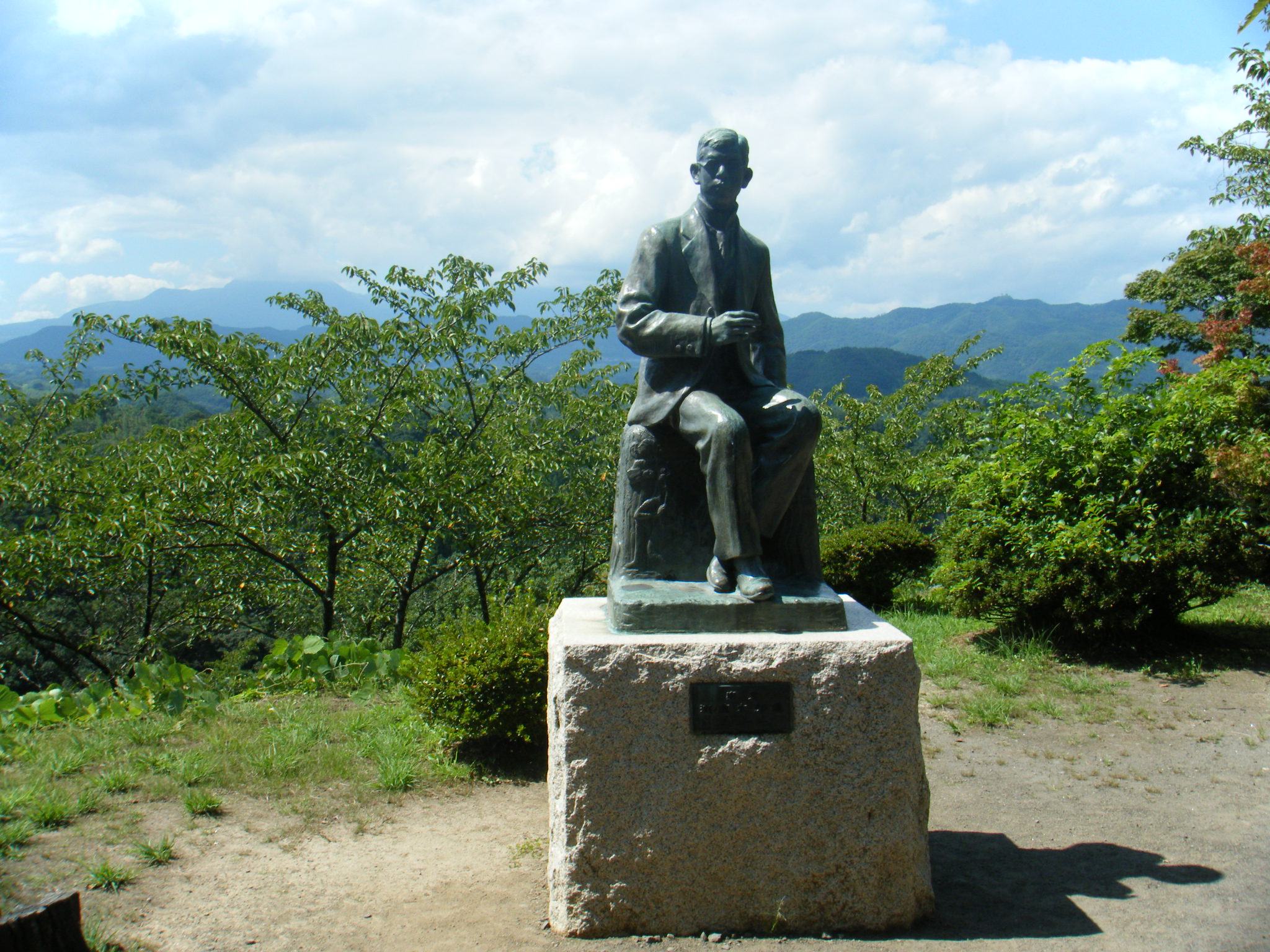
The statue of Rentarō Taki at the Oka Castle

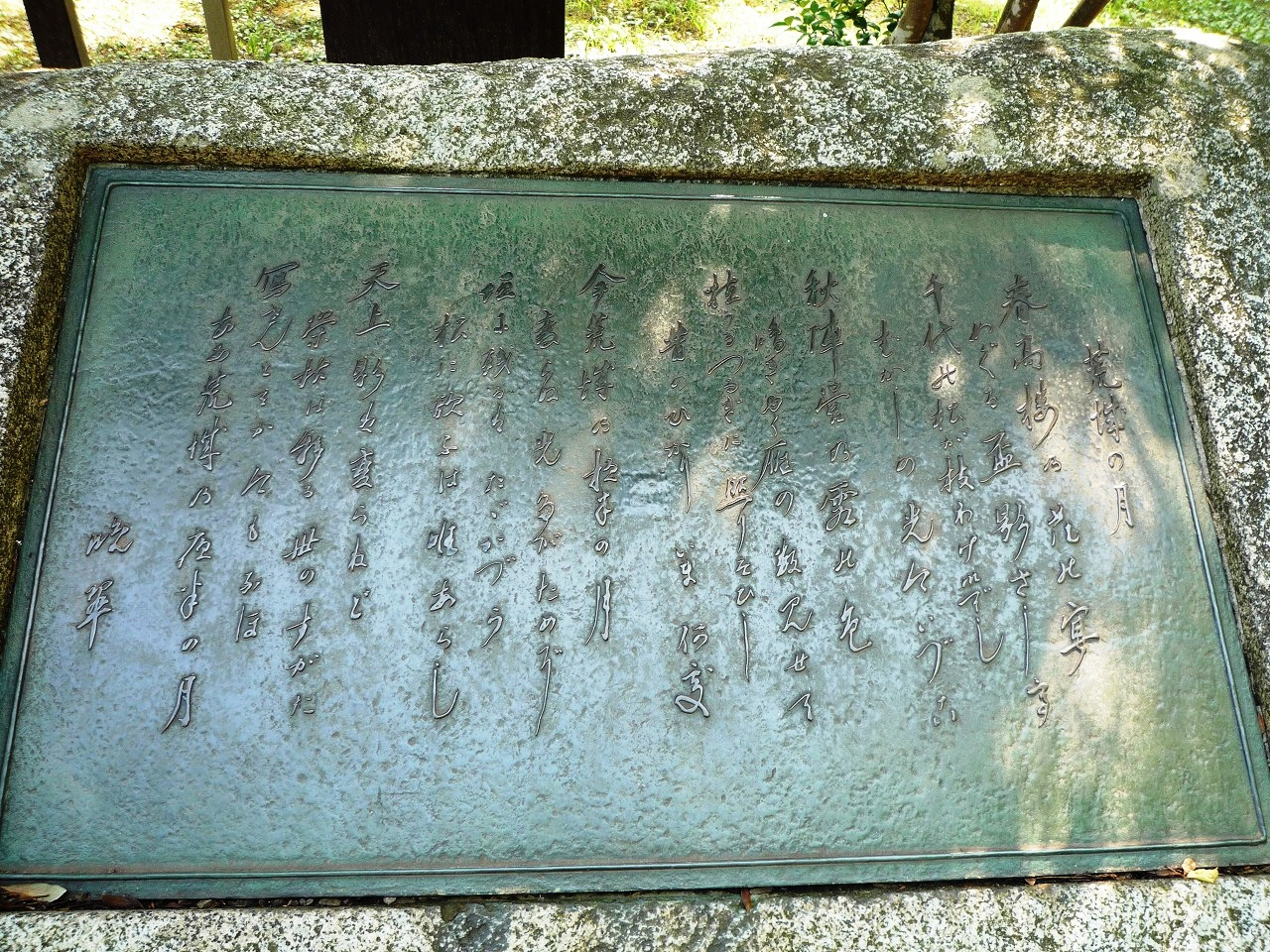
The lyric monument of the song "Kōjō no Tsuki" at the Aoba Castle

"Kōjō no Tsuki" (荒城の月, lit. "The Moon over the Ruined Castle") is a Japanese song written in the Meiji period.

== History ==
Japanese pianist and composer Rentarō Taki composed the music as a music lesson song without instrumental accompaniment in 1901. The song was included in the songbook for Junior High School students. The music of the song was inspired by the ruins of Oka Castle whereas the lyrics, written by Bansui Doi, were inspired by the ruins of Aoba Castle and Aizuwakamatsu Castle.

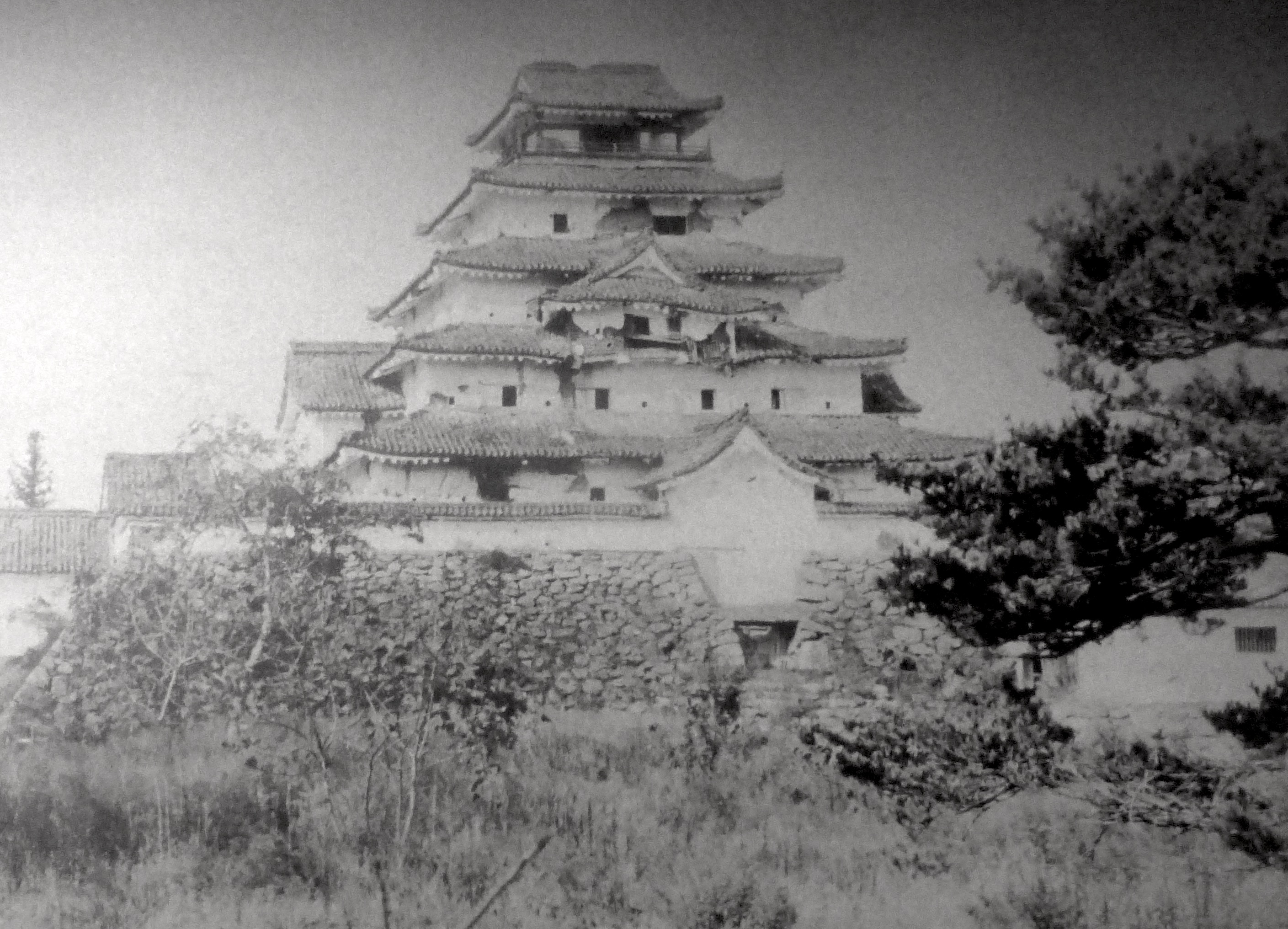
The original tenshu of Aizuwakamatsu Castle (1868), Aizuwakamatsu, Fukushima Prefecture

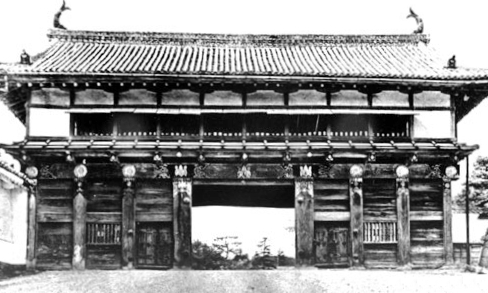
Aoba Castle, Sendai (1938). It was destroyed by the fire-bombing of Sendai in 1945.

Taki's original version of the song is a B minor song, but Kosaku Yamada's slow-paced nostalgic D minor version is also popular as an accompanied song. Taki's original version of the song uses E♯ on the second bar, but the modern version usually uses E probably because the original version did not fit the traditional Japanese music.

Japanese tenor singer Yoshie Fujiwara put his singing of the song on a record in 1925. He was the first Japanese singer to popularize the song throughout the world.

A jazz arrangement was recorded by Thelonious Monk under the title "Japanese Folk Song" on his 1967 album Straight, No Chaser. This version can be heard in the 2016 American movie La La Land, as one of the main characters tries to memorize and play it.

The song was sung and recorded live in the form of a power ballad by the German heavy metal band Scorpions, during a concert at the Nakano Sun Plaza in Tokyo. It was released on their 1978 live album Tokyo Tapes. The band's version was one of the rare renditions following Taki's original version quite well. This song was also performed as an instrumental by Yngwie Malmsteen during the 1984 Alcatrazz Japan Tour. A live recording of his performance at the Sun Plaza Tokyo was released on the "Metallic Live" DVD of Alcatrazz. Takeshi Terauchi & Blue Jeans, a Japanese band, recorded an instrumental rock cover of "Kōjō no Tsuki" on their album Let's Go Blue Jeans.

A guitar version was recorded by renowned performer Eduardo Falú under the name "La luna sobre las ruinas del castillo" on his 1974 album Palabras para mi guitarra

New Age pianist George Winston arranged and included this piece in his 2004 album Montana: A Love Story. The song was also sung live by Japanese enka singer Kiyoshi Hikawa in 2008.

In August 2012, Jackie Evancho recorded the song in Japanese as a bonus track to the Japanese release of the album Songs from the Silver Screen.

The 2020 video game Cyberpunk 2077 features the character Hanako Arasaka singing a version of "Kōjō no Tsuki" whilst on a parade float. The player is afforded an opportunity to pause the mission and listen.

== Legacy ==
In 1998 the asteroid 8957 Koujounotsuki was named after the song.
