= Lisa Lynne =

American harpist

Lisa Lynne is a Celtic harpist, a composer and new-age recording artist. She is a self-proclaimed multi-instrumentalist who has "spent the last eighteen years pursuing her passion for the Celtic harp."

Lynne released her first solo albums, starting in 1992, as Lisa Franco on the German label Innovative Communication. Also in the early 1990s, she became part of the group Celestial Winds, with David Young, releasing a number of albums. Since 1998, Lynne has released albums of Celtic harp music on New Earth Records, Windham Hill Records and her own label, Lavender Sky Music. Her 2003 release, Hopes & Dreames (New Earth) reached #6 on Billboard Magazine's Top New Age Albums chart.

In 2002, Lynne became the first musician-in-residence at City of Hope National Cancer Center in Los Angeles. Her program "Hands on Harps," integrates music in the treatment programs at City of Hope.

Music from her Love & Peace album was used in Alone in the Wilderness, a documentary from filmmaker Bob Swerer that aired on PBS, chronicling the life of Richard Proenneke in the Alaskan wilderness.

== Discography ==
As Lisa Franco:

- Bigger Than Blue (Innovative Communication) (1992)
- Romantic Dreams (Innovative) (1993)
- My Way (Innovative) (1993)
- Silken Wings (Innovative) (1994)
- Lisa Franco (Innovative) (1995)
- Best Of (Innovative) (1997)
- Celtic Zen (Yin Yang) (1997) (with Levi Chen)
- Peaceful (PSM/Triple Musik) (2002) (with Peter Seiler)

As Lisa Lynne Franco:

- Moonsongs (Lavender Sky) (1996)
- Quiet Heart (Lavender Sky) (1997)

As Lisa Lynne:

- Daughters of the Celtic Moon, produced by David Arkenstone (Windham Hill) (1998)
- Seasons of the Soul (Windham Hill) (1999)
- New Morning (Lavender Sky) (2001)
- Enchanted Garden (Excelsior) (2001)
- Maiden's Prayer (New Earth) (2001)
- Hopes & Dreams (New Earth) (2003)
- Secret Songs (Lavender Sky) (2007)
- Life is But a Dream (Lavender Sky) (2007)
- Two Worlds One (Lavender Sky) (2008) (with Aryeh Frankfurter)
- Weaving Worlds (Lavender Sky) (2011) (with Aryeh Frankfurter)

With George Tortorelli:

- Love & Peace (Lavender Sky) (1997)
- Fairie Tales (Lavender Sky) (1997)
- Silent Night (Lavender Sky) (2004)
- "Light in The Wood" (Lavender Sky) (2009)

With Celestial Winds:

- Harp & Recorder (1991)
- Sweet Dreams (1993)
- Celestial Winds III (1993)
- The Trio (1993)
- Celestial Winds I (1994)
- Christmas Morning (1994)
- Oceans of Love (1995)
- Moonsongs (1996)

With Midnight Skye:

- The Odyssey (Sound Designs of Arizona) (1993)
- Paint With Fire (Sound Designs of Arizona) (1994)
- Northwest Passage (Sound Designs of Arizona) (1997)
