= Gulf Coast Blues and Impressions: A Hurricane Relief Benefit =

Gulf Coast Blues & Impressions: A Hurricane Relief Benefit

Studio album by George Winston
- Released: September 5, 2006
- Recorded: 2006
- Genre: Blues; jazz; ambient; new age
- Length: 47:05
- Label: Windham Hill; Dancing Cat
- Producer: George Winston

George Winston chronology
Montana: A Love Story (2005)	Gulf Coast Blues & Impressions: A Hurricane Relief Benefit (2006)	Love Will Come: The Music of Vince Guaraldi, Volume 2 (2010)

Professional ratings
Review scores
Source	Rating
Allmusic	4/5 stars

Gulf Coast Blues & Impressions: A Hurricane Relief Benefit is the 15th album of pianist George Winston, and his eleventh solo piano album, released in 2006. It is his last record with Windham Hill before the label's closure in 2007. It is his second benefit, recorded to raise funds to help victims of Hurricane Katrina.

== Track listing ==
All tracks are written by George Winston except where noted.

No.	Title	Writer(s)	Length
1.	"New Orleans Shall Rise Again"		2:43
2.	"Creole Moon"	Dr. John	6:23
3.	"Pixie"	James Booker	5:16
4.	"The Breaks"	Henry Butler	4:15
5.	"Pixie No. 3" (Gobâjie)		4:17
6.	"Stevenson"		1:57
7.	"Gulf Coast Lullaby – Part 1"		2:38
8.	"Gulf Coast Lullaby – Part 2"		2:51
9.	"When the Saints Go Marching In"	Traditional, arr. George Winston	11:55
10.	"Blues for Fess, Beloved"		4:56
Total length:			47:05
