= Alexander Hamilton High School (Los Angeles) =

Public secondary school in Los Angeles, California, United States

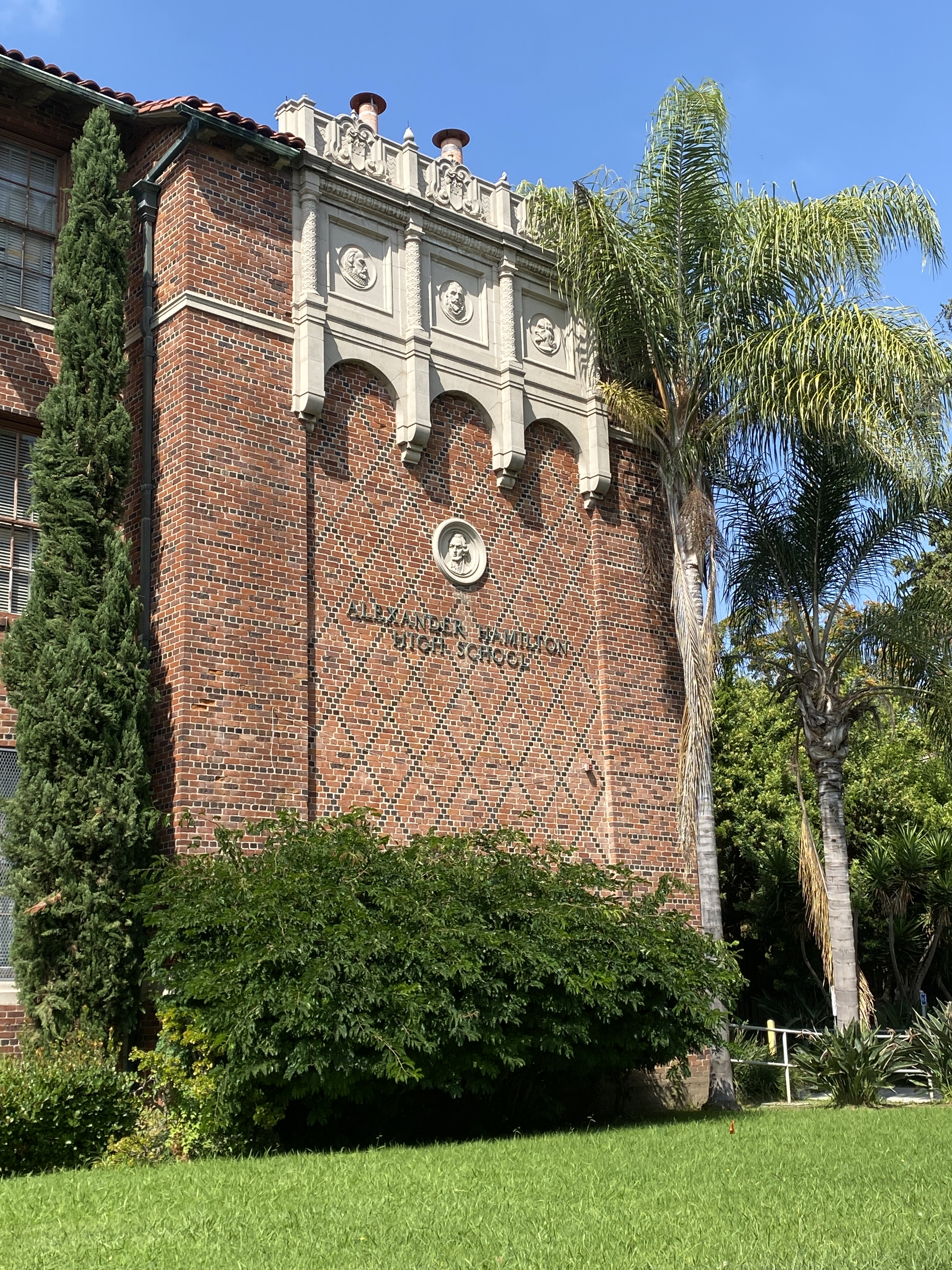

Location
- 2955 South Robertson Boulevard; Los Angeles, California 90034; United States; 34°02′03″N 118°23′26″W

Information
- Type: Public
- Established: 1931
- Locale: City, Large
- School district: Los Angeles Unified School District
- NCES District ID: 0622710
- NCES School ID: 062271003064
- Principal: Jennifer Baxter
- Assistant Principal(s): Margarita Arias Alonzo Jones Adrian Magee Steven Valencia
- Teaching staff: 118.25 (on an FTE basis)
- Grades: 9–12
- Enrollment: 2,025(2025-2026)
  - Male: 959
  - Female: 1,095
- Student to teacher ratio: 17.38
- Colors: Green and white
- Athletics: Basketball(Boys and Girls), Cheer(Sideline/Competitive), Soccer(Boys and Girls), Wrestling, Football, Flag Football, Tennis, Volleyball, Cross Country, Swimming, Track & Field, Esports
- Athletics conference: CIF Los Angeles City Section; Western League
- Nickname: Yankees
- Newspaper: The Federalist
- Website: Home page of Hamilton High School

Alexander Hamilton High School, known colloquially as Hamilton High School, Hamilton, or Hami is a public high school in the Castle Heights neighborhood within the Westside of Los Angeles, California, United States. It is in the Los Angeles Unified School District. It was established in 1931.

== History ==
Alexander Hamilton High School opened in Fall 1931, with Thomas Hughes Elson as the principal. It was designed by architects John C. Austin and Frederic M. Ashley. The three-story administration building held the administration, library, and science departments and 24 classrooms. Other buildings were a manual training building, another for physical training, and a fourth for the cafeteria and "domestic science." The capacity would be 1000, with plans permitting increasing to 2500. Building costs were $125,000 for the land, $400,000 for the structure, and $200,000 for equipment. Built in the Northern Italian Renaissance style, multicolored and patterned brickwork, elaborate cast stone decoration, and a bell tower clad in verdigris copper distinguish the building.

Austin and Ashley later designed Hamilton's $100,000 six-room auditorium, Waidelich Hall which opened on April 20, 1937. The hall was named after Arthur George Waidelich, the second principal at the school. On February 21, 1989, the auditorium was renamed the Norman J. Pattiz Concert Hall. A brass plaque made by the industrial arts department to commemorate the 1937 dedication was removed during renovation.

In the present day, the common buildings that were built are Brown Hall. Brown Hall houses administrative offices, the library, and classrooms and is named in honor of Walker Brown, Principal (1940–1956). There are also the lab, tech, humanities building, the music/A buildings, among similar structures. Right next to the front entrance, there is a large theater hall, known Norman J. Pattiz Concert Hall. Alongside that, there are two gym buildings (boys' and girls'), and a workshop building. On the west part of the campus is Los Angeles Department of Water and Power Distribution Station 20 and Cheviot Hills High School, a continuation school. The athletic fields include Al Michaels Field (a football and track stadium named for sportscaster Al Michaels, Hamilton's famous alum) and a community garden, known as the Hami Garden. The Hami Garden was originally a joint project funded by the South Robertson Neighborhood Council, and the Hami High Environmental Club in 2009. It is maintained by community members and students.

Alexander Hamilton High School was part the Los Angeles City High School District until 1961, when it merged with LAUSD.

In 1932, its attendance boundaries extended as far north as Mulholland Highway. In fall 2007, some neighborhoods that were originally bound to Hamilton High's attendance were rezoned to Venice High School.

== In Pop Culture ==
Alexander Hamilton Senior High School has been featured in multiple industry projects, with the most notable being: That's So Raven, Sweet Valley High (TV series), Sister, Sister (TV series), Beverly Hills, 90210, My So-Called Life, the music video for American singer-songwriter Ariana Grande's Thank U, Next (song), which was released in November 2018, and the music video for the American rock band My Chemical Romance's 2004 single, I'm Not Okay (I Promise).

== Demographics ==
As of the 2025-2026 academic school year, there were approximately 2,025 students enrolled at Hamilton High School.

== SLCs (Small Learning Communities) ==
Alexander Hamilton High School is divided into three different learning communities and two magnet schools(five in total), each having its own category of studies. SLCs are often noted as "schools within a school" by students, staff/faculty, and parents. Each community has its own set of rigorous academic training system standards required for graduation.

- School for Advanced Studies (SAS) - focuses on the skills of advanced learners through a high level course placement.
- Business and Interactive Technology (BITA) - focuses on business and technology studies.
- Communication Arts Academy (CAA) - focuses on the fine and communicational arts while incorporating advanced college infused learning elements/environments.
- Humanities Magnet (Humanities) - focuses on art, literature, history, and social sciences.
- Academy of Music And Performing Arts Magnet - focuses on the performing arts such as musical theatre, drama, dance, film, and technical theatre. Additional electives are supplied to accommodate multiple majors of studies. Most notable majors are dance and musical theatre, with multiple showcases offered per each semester.

== Notable people ==
=== Alumni ===
==== Film and television ====
- Lizzy Caplan, actress
- David Cassidy, actor and musician (attended, didn't graduate)
- Jackie Cruz, actress
- Kaitlin Doubleday, actress
- Dolores Faith, actress
- Brian Austin Green, actor
- Rita Hayworth, actress
- Emile Hirsch, actor
- Bruce Kimmel, actor, writer, director
- Shia LaBeouf, actor
- Michele Lee, actress
- Alex D. Linz, actor
- Tommy "Tiny" Lister, actor
- Darris Love, actor
- William Margold, adult film actor and director
- Bill Mumy, actor
- Marc Norman, screenwriter
- Randall Park, actor, comedian, and writer
- Paula Patton, actress
- Michelle Phillips, actress, singer
- Kyla Pratt, actress
- Michael Preece, film and television director, script supervisor, producer, and actor
- Roger Pulvers, playwright, theatre director and translator in Japan and Australia
- Nikki Reed, actress
- Robert Ri'chard, actor
- Joni Robbins, voice-over actress
- Steven Robman, director and producer
- Will Rothhaar, actor
- Stu Segall, director and producer
- Carl Tart, actor
- Gwen Verdon, film and Broadway actress
- Ivy Wolk, actress, comedian, and writer

==== Law ====
- Evan Freed, attorney, photographer of Robert F. Kennedy presidential campaign, 1968
- William Ginsburg, attorney who represented Monica Lewinsky during investigations into her relationship with President Clinton
- Robert Shapiro, one of the defense lawyers in the O. J. Simpson murder case

==== Literature ====
- Albert Boime, author and academic historian
- Sikivu Hutchinson, author and feminist educator
- Adam Kirsch, author, journalist, and critic
- Olympia LePoint, author and rocket scientist
- Walter Mosley, author
- Joel Siegel, author and critic on ABC television

==== Music ====
- Wil-Dog Abers, singer for Ozomatli
- Fiona Apple, singer-songwriter (sophomore year only)
- Kevin Bivona, musician and audio engineer
- Warryn Campbell, music producer
- Reeve Carney, singer-songwriter and actor
- Billy Childs, pianist and composer
- Julian Coryell, guitarist, singer-songwriter, and producer
- Eligh, rapper, producer
- Mike Elizondo, bassist and producer
- Joel Grey, singer and actor
- Murs, rapper
- Jordan Hill, singer
- Julia Holter, singer-songwriter
- Anna Homler, visual, performance and vocal artist
- Robert Hurwitz, former president of Nonesuch Records
- Nipsey Hussle, rapper
- Silvia Kohan, singer-songwriter
- Abe Laboriel, Jr., drummer
- Howard Leese, guitarist
- Jeff Long, bassist
- Mann, rapper
- Omarion, singer
- Mimi Page, recording artist, songwriter, producer, and composer
- Ariel Rechtshaid, music producer, composer, and musician
- Daniel Rossen, guitarist
- Scarub, rapper, producer
- Jon Schwartz, drummer
- Stu Segall, producer and director
- Shade Sheist, recording artist, songwriter, producer, actor
- Stew, composer
- Houston Summers, singer
- Syd, singer and songwriter, member of Odd Future
- Elle Varner, singer
- Kamasi Washington, jazz saxophonist
- JHawk, record producer and songwriter

==== Sports ====
- Laila Ali, women's boxing champion
- Stephen Baker, wide receiver for the 1990 Super Bowl champion New York Giants
- Ronald Barak, Olympic gymnast
- Nick Bravin, Olympic fencer
- Alex Hannum, basketball player and coach
- Alex Hoffman-Ellis, football linebacker
- Gary Kirner, football offensive lineman
- Peanuts Lowrey, baseball player
- Rod Martin, football linebacker
- Al Michaels, sportscaster
- Warren Moon, football quarterback
- Armani Rogers, football player
- Clancy Smyres, baseball player
- Leigh Steinberg, sports agent
- Sidney Wicks, basketball player
- John Wilbur, football player

==== Politics ====
- Karen Bass, 43rd Mayor of Los Angeles, former representative of California's 37th congressional district
- Howard Berman, former representative of California's 28th congressional district; chairman of the House Foreign Affairs Committee
- Paul Koretz, City of Los Angeles Council member
- Lynn Schenk, former representative of California's 49th congressional district

==== Other ====
- Arlene Klasky, co-creator of Rugrats
- Michael Elowitz, synthetic biologist
- Greg Johnson, creator of the ToeJam & Earl and Starflight games
- Larry Josephson, radio producer and host at WBAI and KPFA
- Susan B. Nelson, activist
- Norman J. Pattiz, founder of Westwood One
- Ben Rich, former director of the Lockheed Skunk Works
- Lilly Samuels Tartikoff, ballet dancer and philanthropist

=== Faculty ===
- Barry Smolin, singer-songwriter, radio host, and author; taught English
- Marion Vree, composer, arranger; taught music
