= Olympia LePoint =

American author and engineer

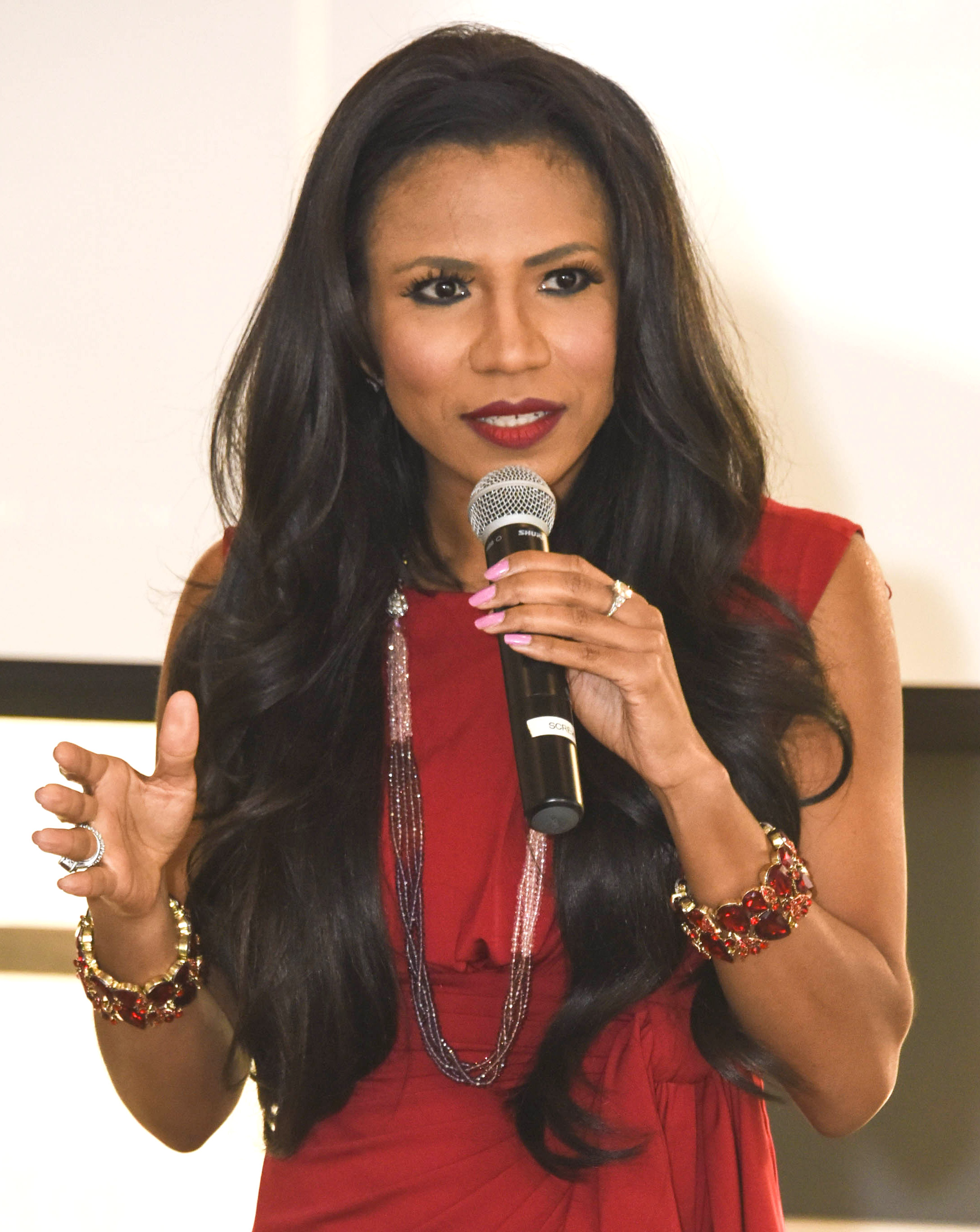
- Olympia LePoint speaking on stage in Los Angeles, California.
- Born: Los Angeles, California
- Education: California State University, Northridge
- Occupations: Professional public speaker, rocket scientist & author
- Known for: Science Books, NASA Space Shuttle, NASA SpaceX Education, Triabrain Theory of Relativity, Quantum Deciding
- Website: olympialepoint.com

Olympia Ann LePoint is an American author, professional speaker and rocket scientist. LePoint helped design rockets for 28 of NASA Space Shuttle missions between 1998 and 2007. In 2007, LePoint discovered and in 2010 trademarked the condition and term Mathaphobia, a learning disability and math fear linked to the amygdala. She published the book, Mathaphobia: How You Can Overcome Your Math Fears and Become a Rocket Scientist in 2013.

LePoint coined the term Triabrain and created the Trianbrain Theory of relativity in her self-help book, Answers Unleashed: The Science of Unleashing Your Brain’s Power in 2018. As LePoint considered her personal experiences in overcoming poverty, gang violence and sexual abuse, she created the Triabrain Theory of Relativity as a method to explain how she rewired her brain to overcome painful memories and succeed. The theory states the brain extends through the entire human body and into an energy field around a human. She has also discussed this topic and the formation of intuition during a TED-style talk at her alma mater in 2018.

In 2021, LePoint coined a human decision-making science theory called Quantum Deciding. It shows how a person can overcome fear to foresee the best future, then make effective decisions to reach that desired outcome. Her science theory is based on her own personal experiences, Albert Einstein's Quantum Entanglement Theory and NASA's long-distance quantum teleportation discoveries in December 2020.

== Early life and education ==
LePoint was born in Los Angeles, California and was raised by a single mother in a poverty-stricken area. After a field trip to the Jet Propulsion Laboratory in Pasadena, California at the age of six, LePoint decided to become a rocket scientist. At the age of 10, she was stabbed in the face by a gang member which led to her transfer to a gifted magnet school where she began to fail math before a teacher helped turn around her grades.

After middle school, LePoint was selected to study at Alexander Hamilton Music Academy within Alexander Hamilton High School, a school located near Beverly Hills, California. She graduated from Alexander Hamilton High School at the age of 16, and left home to enter studies at California State University, Northridge.

Shortly after enrollment, LePoint was caught in a collapsing campus residence building where she survived the catastrophic January 17, 1994, Northridge earthquake, which destroyed the university campus, injuring 8,700, and killing her classmate among the 56 others. LePoint continued at California State University, Northridge to study and tutor mathematics receiving the Karen, Leo and Rita Saulter Memorial Award, and graduating as 1 of top 5, of a 6,500 graduating class in 1998.

Following the completion of her undergraduate studies at the age of 21, she was hired as a mathematician for The Boeing Company, where she was a professional rocket scientist for NASA programs from 1998 to 2007. LePoint redirected her focus on the brain's healing power after her mother experienced a catastrophic brain injury in 2004. In 2017, LePoint explained how her brain reshaped and healed from painful memories with the Triabrain Theory of Relativity. In 2019, LePoint underwent a surgery and saved her life. Later in 2021, LePoint used her experiences, and she focused on the power of human mind to see the future and make life-saving decisions, an ability she defined as Quantum Deciding.

== Career ==
While at Boeing, LePoint helped launch NASA's Endeavour, Discovery, Columbia, and Atlantis Space Shuttles. As a specialist supporting the Mission Control Center, she was responsible for recommending real-time solutions to ensure safe rocket launches and authorized multimillion-dollar rocket engine testing and was the youngest person to present information to NASA on that scale. LePoint helped design and build experimental space rockets, and to launch 28 NASA Space Shuttles from 1998 to 2007.

LePoint's awards include Boeing Company's Professional Excellence Award given by The Chief Technology Office in 2004, the National Black Engineer of the Year "Modern Day Technology Leader" Award in 2003, the Engineers' Council Incorporated 2001 Distinguished Engineering Project Achievement Award, the 2000 Boeing Company Technical Excellence Award, an A-1 Toastmasters International Speech Contest Winner in 2007, the 2009 San Fernando Valley Business Journal "Top 40 Under 40" Business Leaders Award, and the 2010 All Things Girl article entitled "An Inspiring Woman."

LePoint established the book publishing and educational entertainment company, OL Consulting Corporation in 2010 and holds a Bachelor of Science degree in Mathematics along with a Master of Science degree in Applied Mathematics from California State University Northridge.

In 2007, LePoint made the discovery of mathaphobia and trademarked the term in 2010. Mathaphobia is a fear in the brain which prevents math literacy, basic math calculations and analytical problem-solving. In 2013, Olympia LePoint wrote the book. Mathaphobia: How You Can Overcome Your Math Fears and Become a Rocket Scientist, a self-help, educational book designed to help adults and students to overcome their math fears. In 2017, LePoint wrote the book Answers Unleashed: The Science of Unleashing Your Brain’s Power, where she coins the term brainbrink, which destroys intuition and mental awareness by disconnecting the Triabrain’s striatum from the prefrontal cortex communication.

She discussed her personal story launching rockets, her books, and her discoveries on the TV show Impact Theory which was broadcast around the world. In November 2017, Olympia LePoint hosted a TED-like talk at California State University Northridge called "Your Brain Master Class." LePoint's master class lecture focused on the effectiveness of unleashing brainpower with her "Triabrain Theory of Relativity," which she described as using the power of science combined with faith to reshape thinking processes.

In 2019, Olympia LePoint was invited to speak as a celebrity guest science entertainer at the SAS Global Technology Forum in Dallas, Texas, United States where she spoke to over 6,000 international technology experts gathered from the Artificial intelligence and Data Science technology industries. In the talk, LePoint revealed her experiences in building innovation and igniting renewed-thinking as a female leader in technology, diversity, and the solution-finding processes.

In 2021, LePoint wrote her third book, Answers Unleashed II: The Science of Attracting What You Want, where LePoint defines a new decision-making science theory called Quantum Deciding. LePoint defines a defines the math that explains time and decisions relative to human experiences. LePoint’s theory states that people have the mental ability to jump into their desired futures, then return to the present and make effective decisions to reach a preferred outcome. In the book, LePoint defines a math to show the power of decisions. She introduces the “Tria-Self” as a part of thinking process that refers to a “Past-Self” who must overcome past fears, a “Future-Self” who knows the innovative steps toward personal success, and a “Present-Self” who holds the power to make decisions. (LePoint, 2021) Her science of attraction theory is based on her personal experiences, Albert Einstein’s Quantum Entanglement Theory and NASA’s 2020 discovery of long-distance teleportation.

== TV and media ==
LePoint has appeared in magazines and news publications, including recognition in 2010 as "The New Face for Math Literacy," for her Mathaphobia explanation on Oprah.com. She also appeared on Dr. Drew's Life Changers TV Show in 2012, as well as The Bret Lewis News Hour, Jump Shipp on The Halogen Network, and Christians OnDemand Episodes. In 2014, she presented a TEDx talk, "Reprogramming Your Brain to Overcome Fear", at TEDxPCC.

In 2015, LePoint appeared on Between the Lines on PBS. In 2017, LePoint was featured in numerous international magazines and newspapers during the motion picture release of Hidden Figures including People Magazine. She has also appeared on the international show Impact Theory and Open Minds.

From 2014 to 2018, LePoint was a science contributor for Huffington Post when its American blog contributor division was active.

In 2018, LePoint created Answers Unleashed Productions and began executive producing educational programming for Radio and TV.

LePoint is a contributing science journalist on Thrive Global and CBS News in Los Angeles. In 2020, Olympia LePoint was recruited by Arianna Huffington to write science news on Thrive Global. During the same year, LePoint was recruited by CBS News producers in Los Angeles to provide commentary as a former NASA engineer for the first NASA Crew Dragon Demo-2 Space flight and first NASA SpaceX Crew-1 launch to the International Space Station. Olympia LePoint's commentary during the NASA SpaceX Crew-1 historical launch was broadcast internationally through CBS TV and CBSN digital news.

LePoint hosts her talk show Answers Unleashed, and is a regularly featured thought-leader and guest expert for science, technology, engineering and technology on TV, Radio, and Social Media.

== Bibliography ==
- LePoint, Olympia (2021). Answers Unleashed II (Answers Unleashed II: The Science of Attracting What You Want). CA: OL Consulting Corporation & Publishing. pp. 133–150. ISBN 978-0-9885376-9-9.
- LePoint, Olympia (2017). Answers Unleashed (Answers Unleashed: The Science of Unleashing Your Brain's Power). CA: OL Consulting Corporation & Publishing. p. 314. ISBN 978-0-9885376-2-0.
- LePoint, Olympia (2013). Mathaphobia (Mathaphobia: How You Can Overcome Your Math Fears and Become a Rocket Scientist). CA: OL Consulting Corporation & Publishing. p. 208. ISBN 978-0988537637.
