= The Glendy Burk =

Song
- Language: English
- Published: 1860
- Genre: American folk song
- Songwriter(s): Stephen Foster

The Glendy Burk is an American folk song by Stephen Foster. It appears in James Buckley's New Banjo Book published in 1860. The Glendy Burk of the song is a paddle steamer plying the Mississippi River basin. The boat was named for Glendy Burke: the 29th mayor of New Orleans.

== Lyrics ==
The Glendy Burk is a mighty fast boat,
With a mighty fast captain too;
He sits up there on the hurricane roof
And he keeps his eye on the crew.
I can't stay here, for the work's too hard;
I'm bound to leave this town;
I'll take my duds and tote 'em on my back
When the Glendy Burk comes down.

Chorus:
Ho! for Louisiana!
I'm bound to leave this town;
I'll take my duds and tote 'em on my back
When the Glendy Burk comes down.

The Glendy Burk has a funny old crew
And they sing the boatman's song,
They burn the pitch and the pine knot too,
For to shove the boat along.

The smoke goes up and the engine roars
And the wheel goes round and round,
So fair ye well for I'll take a little ride
When the Glendy Burk comes down.

I'll work all night in the wind and storm,
I'll work all day in the rain,
Till I find myself on the levy dock
In New Orleans again.

They make me mow in the hay field here
And knock my head with the flail,
I'll go one day work with the sugar and the cane
And roll on the cotton bale.

My lady love is as pretty as a pink,
I'll meet her on the way
I'll take her back to the sunny old south
And there I'll make her stay.

So don't you fret my honey dear,
Oh! don't you fret Miss Brown
I'll take you back 'fore the middle of the week
When the Glendy Burk comes down.
