= Rentarō Taki =

Japanese pianist and composer

- 瀧 廉太郎
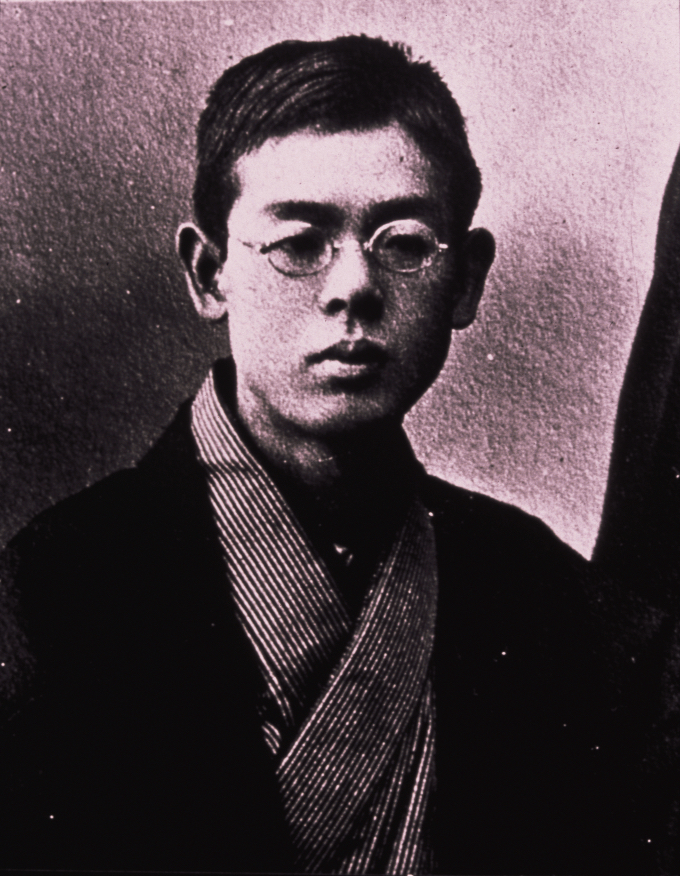
- Born: 24 August 1879; Tokyo, Empire of Japan
- Died: 29 June 1903 (aged 23); Ōita City, Empire of Japan
- Occupations: Pianist; composer

Rentarō Taki (滝 廉太郎, Taki Rentarō; 24 August 1879 – 29 June 1903) was a Japanese pianist and composer of the Meiji era.

Taki was born in Tokyo, but moved to many places during his childhood owing to his father's job. He went to Tokyo Music School (now known as Tokyo University of the Arts) and was taught by Nobu Koda, graduating in 1901. One of his famous pieces is "Kōjō no Tsuki" (Moon Over the Ruined Castle), which was included in the songbook for junior high school students, along with the "Hakone-Hachiri" (箱根八里). "Hana" (花, "Flower") is also a well-known song.

In the same year, Taki went to the Leipzig Conservatory in Germany for further studies, but fell seriously ill with pulmonary tuberculosis and therefore returned to Japan. He lived quietly in the country afterwards, but soon died at the age of 23. His posthumous work is a solo piano piece called "Urami" (憾, "Regret"), which he wrote four months before he died.

== Recordings ==
- "Kōjō no Tsuki" performed by Jean-Pierre Rampal and Ensemble Lunaire, Japanese Folk Melodies. transcribed by Akio Yashiro, CBS Records, 1978.
- "Kōjō no Tsuki" performed by New Kyoto Ensemble, Distant Winds: The Music of Japan. Intersound, 1992. (no composers are credited on this album)
