= Malcolm Dalglish =

- Born: August 14, 1952 (age 74)
- Origin: United States
- Genres: Celtic, folk
- Occupations: Instrumentalist, composer, choral director
- Instruments: Hammered dulcimer, spoons, bones
- Formerly of: Metamora

Malcolm Dalglish (born August 14, 1952) is an American hammered dulcimer player and builder, composer, and choral director.

A virtuoso performer on the hammer dulcimer, he is a former member of the folk/Celtic trio Metamora and has performed frequently with the percussionist Glen Velez. In addition to the dulcimer, Dalglish also plays the spoons and bones (both traditional American percussion instruments). Beginning in the mid-1970s he honed his playing at Hap's Irish Pub in Cincinnati in a duo with flutist and concertina player Grey Larsen. He also composes prolifically for choir, and many of his compositions are for choir with dulcimer accompaniment. He has received more than 50 commissions to compose for choirs around the world. He played the hammered dulcimer in the score for the 1981 film Tuck Everlasting. Several of his songs with the Ooolite choral group come from the poetic work of Wendell Berry.

Dalglish attended Oberlin College and the University of Cincinnati College-Conservatory of Music. He lives in Bloomington, Indiana, where his publishing company, Ooolitic Music, is based.

== Discography ==
=== As leader ===
- 1977 Banish Misfortune (with Grey Larsen) (June Appal)
- 1978 First of Autumn (with Grey Larsen) (June Appal)
- 1982 Thunderhead (with Grey Larsen) (Flying Fish)
- 1986 Jogging the Memory (Windham Hill)
- 1991 Hymnody of Earth (Music Masters)
- 1997 Pleasure (Ooolitic)
- 2003 Carpe Diem! A Ceremony of Song [live]

=== With Metamora ===
- 1984 Root Crops and Ground Cover (Tarquel)
- 1985 Metamora (Pamlico)
- 1987 The Great Road (Pamlico)
- 1990 Morning Walk (Windham Hill)

=== With Debby McClatchy, Bob Carlin, and Grey Larsen ===
- 1981: Off To California (Wildebeest)

=== With Ooodoo ===
- 2007 Into the Sky (Ooolitic)

== See also ==
- List of ambient music artists
