= George Winston =

American musician (1949–2023)

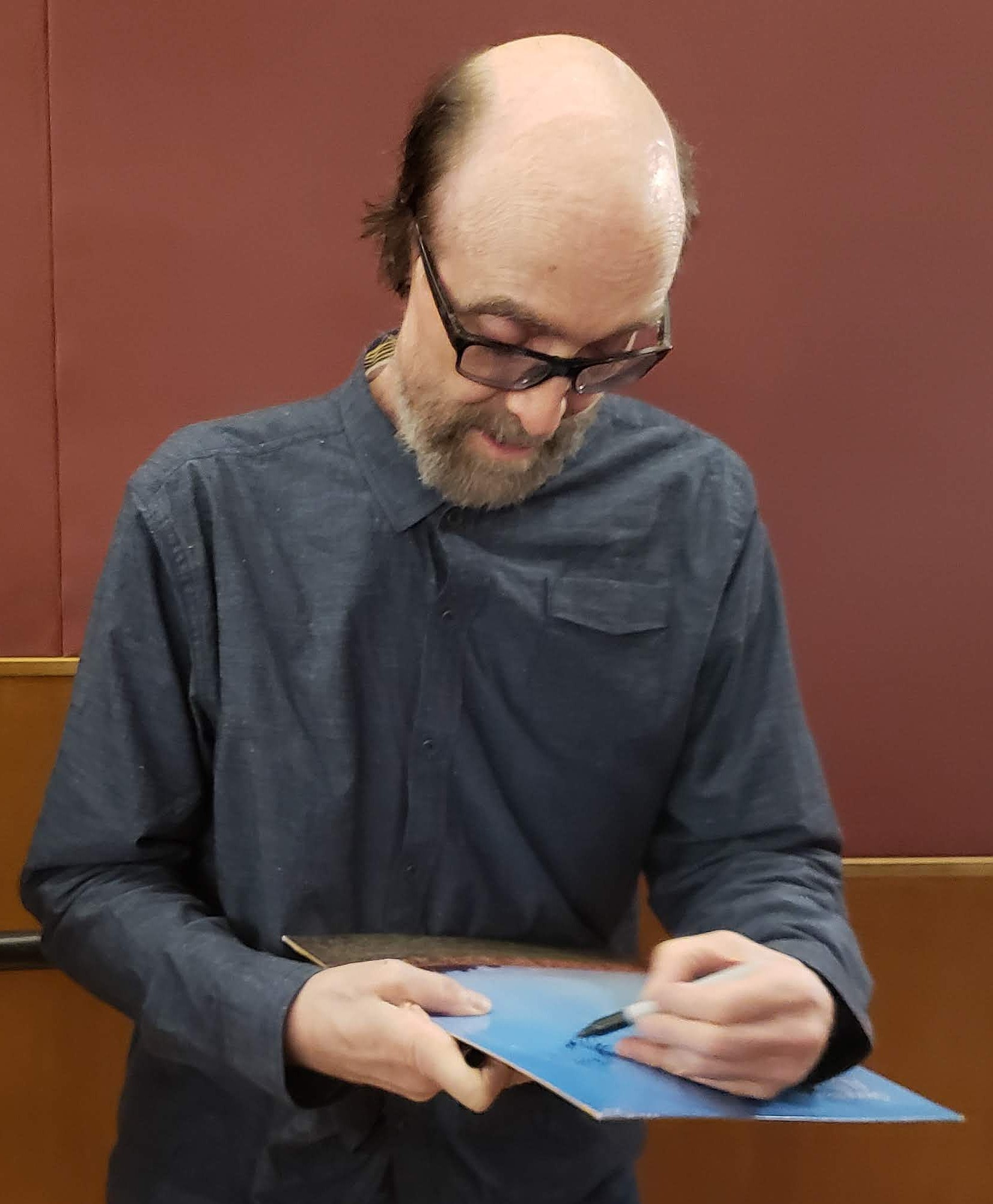
- Winston autographing a copy of his album in 2019

Background information
- Born: George Otis Winston III; February 11, 1949; Hart, Michigan, U.S.
- Died: June 4, 2023 (aged 74) Williamsport, Pennsylvania, U.S.
- Genres: Stride; New Orleans R&B; folk; new age
- Occupation: Musician
- Instruments: Piano; guitar; harmonica
- Years active: 1972–2022
- Labels: Dancing Cat; RCA; Sony Classical; Windham Hill; Takoma
- Website: georgewinston.com

George Otis Winston III (February 11, 1949 – June 4, 2023) was an American pianist performing contemporary instrumental music. Best known for his solo piano recordings, Winston released his first album in 1972, and came to prominence with his 1980 album Autumn, which was followed in 1982 by Winter into Spring and December. All three became platinum-selling albums, with December becoming a triple-platinum album. A total of 16 solo albums were released, accumulating over 15 million records sold, with the 1994 album Forest earning Winston a Grammy award for Best New Age Album. Winston received four other Grammy nominations, including one for Best Children's Music Album, performed with actress Meryl Streep, and another for Best Contemporary Instrumental Album for his interpretation of works by the rock band the Doors.

Winston played in three styles: the melodic approach that he developed and called "rural folk piano"; stride piano, primarily inspired by Fats Waller and Teddy Wilson; and his primary interest, New Orleans rhythm and blues (R&B) piano, influenced by James Booker, Professor Longhair and Henry Butler. While the majority of his recordings were in the folk piano style, Winston mostly enjoyed playing R&B piano. His musical style has been classified as new age and sometimes classical, but he rejected both labels.

Winston also played the guitar and harmonica. His interest in the Hawaiian slack-key guitar led him to start his own record label, Dancing Cat Records.

== Early life and education ==
George Otis Winston III was born in Hart, Michigan, on February 11, 1949. He was raised mainly in Montana (Miles City and Billings), as well as Mississippi and Florida. As a youth, his musical interests included instrumentals of the R&B, rock, pop and jazz genres, especially those by organists. In 1965 at age 16, he became interested in Vince Guaraldi's music when the animated television special A Charlie Brown Christmas premiered, and he soon purchased the soundtrack album featuring Guaraldi's music. Over the next few years, Winston purchased all of Guaraldi's releases and watched each new Peanuts special to hear Guaraldi's newest music. After hearing the Doors in 1967, he was inspired to play the organ. In 1971, he switched to solo piano after hearing the stride pianists Fats Waller, Teddy Wilson and later Earl Hines, Donald Lambert and Cleo Brown.

After graduating from Coral Gables Senior High School in Coral Gables, Florida in 1967, Winston attended Stetson University in DeLand, Florida, where he majored in sociology. While he did not complete his undergraduate degree, following his rise to prominence, the university awarded him an honorary doctor of arts degree.

== Career ==
=== Solo piano works ===
Winston was first recorded by John Fahey for Fahey's Takoma Records. His debut album Piano Solos disappeared without much notice, although it was later reissued on Windham Hill Records under the title Ballads and Blues 1972. In 1979, Winston sent a demo tape to William Ackerman, who had started his new record label, Windham Hill, in 1976. Ackerman offered to produce his next album, which became Autumn; it was soon the best-selling record in the label's catalog. Both Autumn and the following album Winter into Spring went platinum, signifying million-plus shipment in the United States. The Christmas album December became an even greater success, and it was certified triple platinum for shipment of three million.

On the heels of his three successful albums, Winston composed the score to accompany Meryl Streep's narration on The Velveteen Rabbit in 1984, earning a Grammy nomination for Best Children's Music Album. At the request of producer Lee Mendelson in 1988, he provided the music for the TV miniseries This Is America, Charlie Brown, which Winston considered a highlight of his career. At the 38th Annual Grammy Awards in 1996, Winston won the award for Best New Age Album for Forest. Two of his other works, Plains (1999) and Montana: A Love Story (2004), were also later nominated for best new age album.

Winston released two albums of Guaraldi's music. In 1996, he released Linus and Lucy: The Music of Vince Guaraldi, primarily devoted to the theme music Guaraldi wrote for the Peanuts cartoons: fifteen television specials and one feature film, ranging from 1965 until Guaraldi's death in 1976. "I love his melodies and his chord progressions", Winston said of Guaraldi. "He has a really personal way of doing voicings." Winston recorded a follow-up album in 2010, Love Will Come: The Music of Vince Guaraldi, Volume 2. In 2022, he was planning a third volume, Count the Ways: The Music of Vince Guaraldi Volume 3.

Winston's 2002 album Night Divides the Day – The Music of the Doors consists of solo piano renditions of music by the rock band the Doors. The title of the album is a lyric from the band's song "Break on Through (To the Other Side)". The album received a Grammy nomination for Best Contemporary Instrumental Album. Winston suffered from a number of illnesses, and while recuperating from a bout of cancer in 2013, he played the piano in the medical center auditorium, creating 21 pieces, that he says were "kind of circular" and "minimalist". In 2014, he included three of the pieces in a Spring Carousel EP, and a 15-track album, called Spring Carousel: A Cancer Research Benefit released on March 31. Proceeds benefit City of Hope Hospital near Los Angeles, where he was treated and subsequently composed the musical work.

On May 3, 2019, Winston released his 15th solo piano album, Restless Wind. The 11-song collection includes his interpretations of music by Sam Cooke, The Doors, Stephen Stills, George and Ira Gershwin, Country Joe McDonald, among others. "By virtue of his boundless imagination, Winston's musical portrayals provide new textures and tones that illuminate the original compositions while discovering fresh insights and common musical themes", wrote Jazziz about Restless Wind. To kick off the release, Winston performed a concert at Pittsburgh's Carnegie of Homestead Music Hall that benefited the Creative Arts Program, which provides scholarships to pay for music therapy. The album debuted at No. 1 on the Billboard New Age Charts, and No. 2 on the Billboard Jazz Charts.

In July 2019, at the National Music Council's 2019 American Eagle Award Honor ceremony that recognized Vince Guaraldi, Winston performed his versions of the musician's work. From his grand piano, Winston told the audience:

I love Vince's piano playing, and I love his compositions. I play way more of his songs than by any other composer. I first heard him in 1962, with "Cast Your Fate to the Wind"....And then in December 1965, I was a fan of animation, and I saw in the TV Guide that there was going to be a cartoon of the Peanuts characters, A Charlie Brown Christmas. And I thought, wow, I've got to see that. A lot of us remember where we were, the first time we heard "Linus and Lucy" in that special, during the dance segment.... Vince's piano just drove me crazy. And I went to the record store the next day—just to go to the record store—and there was the Charlie Brown Christmas soundtrack, up on the wall. And I looked at it, and thought, Oh, Vince Guaraldi, the "Cast Your Fate" guy. The TV episode credits had run by so fast, I hadn't seen it was Vince Guaraldi. So I got the album, and found "Linus and Lucy", and played it about 100 times on my record player.

In 1983, Winston started his own label, Dancing Cat Records, which released his albums, with distribution by Windham Hill until the mid-2000s and subsequently by RCA. He primarily launched the label to record artists playing the Hawaiian slack-key guitar, which he admired.

=== Non-piano recordings ===
In addition to his piano work, Winston played solo harmonica (mainly Appalachian fiddle tunes and ballads) and solo acoustic guitar (mainly Appalachian fiddle tunes and slack-key guitar pieces). He provided the guitar soundtrack to Sadako and the Thousand Paper Cranes in 1995. Both his harmonica and guitar playing can be heard on his benefit album Remembrance: A Memorial Benefit, which was released shortly after the September 11 attacks. In 2006, he recorded another benefit album, Gulf Coast Blues & Impressions: A Hurricane Relief Benefit, followed by Gulf Coast Blues & Impressions 2: A Louisiana Wetlands Benefit in 2012.

Winston's Dancing Cat Records produced recordings of slack-key guitarists, including artists Keola Beamer, Sonny Chillingworth, Leonard Kwan, Dennis Kamakahi, Ray Kane, Cyril Pahinui, Bla Pahinui, Martin Pahinui, Ledward Kaapana, Georg Kuo, Ozzie Kotani, George Kahumoku Jr., Moses Kahumoku, Cindy Combs and others. He also worked on recording the American traditional musicians Sam Hinton, Rick Epping and Curt Bouterse.

== Musical and performance style ==
Many of Winston's melodic pieces were self-described as "rural folk piano" or "folk piano", a style he developed in 1971 to complement the up-tempo stride piano he had been inspired to play by Fats Waller's recordings from the 1920s and 1930s. These melodic pieces evoked the essence of a season and reflect natural landscapes. The third style he played was New Orleans R&B piano, influenced mainly by James Booker, Professor Longhair, Henry Butler, as well as Dr. John and Jon Cleary. He had been called the "Father of New Age" because his album Autumn was released by Windham Hill Records often described as a new age label; Winston himself denied that his music was new age.

Winston dressed unassumingly for his shows, playing in stocking feet, stating that it quieted his "hard beat pounding" left foot. For years, the balding, bearded Winston would walk out on stage in a flannel shirt and jeans, and the audience would think he was a technician, coming to tune the nine-foot New York Steinways that are his piano of choice. According to the Austin American Statesman in 2015: "As for his piano playing, Winston remains a master of both tone and invention. Starting with a bluesy tune inspired by Professor Longhair—Winston's most recent albums have included two Gulf Coast-inspired collections—he proceeded through seasonal favorites "Rain" (from 1982's Winter Into Spring) and "Woods" (from 1980s Autumn). On the latter, he created remarkable 'hollowed' sounds to some notes by reaching inside the piano and muting strings with one hand while striking keys with the other."

On April 19, 2010, he appeared as the sole guest on show 575 of the multimedia WoodSongs Old-Time Radio Hour. Twenty minutes into the program, he described an unusual method of playing the piano with muted strings, a development inspired by watching blues guitar players. He can be seen reaching into the piano with his left hand and muting the strings, while with his right hand he is playing "An African in the Americas".

== Personal life ==
In his later life, Winston resided in the San Francisco Bay Area. He was active in philanthropy, frequently performing in concerts for various charitable causes.

== Death ==
Winston suffered from several forms of cancer, including thyroid cancer, skin cancer, and myelodysplastic syndrome, the last of which was resolved following a bone marrow transplant in 2013. He died of cancer in Williamsport, Pennsylvania, on June 4, 2023, at age 74. He was survived by his sister, Nancy Kahumoku.

== Discography ==
=== Studio albums ===
List of albums, with selected chart positions
Title	Album details	Peak chart positions				Certifications
Title	Album details	US	US New Age	US Jazz	US Holiday	Certifications
Piano Solos (later rereleased as Ballads and Blues 1972)	Released: 1972; Label: Takoma/Dancing Cat	—	—	—	—	
Autumn	Released: November 1, 1980; Label: Windham Hill/Dancing Cat	139	14	12	—	US: Platinum
Winter into Spring	Released: July 27, 1982; Label: Windham Hill/Dancing Cat	127	11	14	—	US: Platinum
December	Released: 1982; Label: Windham Hill/Dancing Cat	54	4	5	2	CAN: Gold; US: 3× Platinum
Summer	Released: October 8, 1991; Label: Windham Hill/Dancing Cat	55	1	—	—	US: Gold
Forest	Released: October 11, 1994; Label: Windham Hill/Dancing Cat	62	1	—	—	US: Gold
Linus and Lucy: The Music of Vince Guaraldi	Released: September 17, 1996; Label: Windham Hill/Dancing Cat	—	1	—	—	US: Gold
All the Seasons of George Winston	Released: March 24, 1998; Label: Windham Hill/Dancing Cat	—	3	—	—	
Plains	Released: September 28, 1999; Label: Windham Hill/Dancing Cat	76	1	—	—	US: Gold
Night Divides the Day: The Music of the Doors	Released: October 8, 2002; Label: Windham Hill/Dancing Cat	91	1	—	—	
Montana: A Love Story	Released: October 12, 2004; Label: Windham Hill/Dancing Cat	146	1	—	—	
Gulf Coast Blues and Impressions: A Hurricane Relief Benefit	Released: October 4, 2006; Label: Windham Hill/Dancing Cat	—	3	—	—	
Love Will Come: The Music of Vince Guaraldi, Volume 2	Released: February 2, 2010; Label: RCA/Dancing Cat	—	2	—	—	
Gulf Coast Blues and Impressions 2: A Louisiana Wetlands Benefit	Released: March 20, 2012; Label: RCA/Dancing Cat	—	4	—	—	
Spring Carousel: A Cancer Research Benefit	Released: March 31, 2017; Label: RCA/Dancing Cat	—	1	1	—	
Restless Wind	Released: May 3, 2019; Label: RCA/Dancing Cat	—	1	2	—	
Night	Released: May 6, 2022; Label: RCA/Dancing Cat	—	—	16	—	
Eastern Montana	Released: August 30, 2024; Label: Dancing Cat/Valley	—	1	22	—	
Beloved	Released: April 18, 2025; Label: Dancing Cat/Valley	—	—	—	—	
"—" denotes a recording that did not chart

=== Solo harmonica album ===
- 2012 Harmonica Solos

=== Benefit EPs, albums and singles ===
- 2001 Remembrance - A Memorial Benefit (piano, guitar & harmonica solos)
- 2013 Silent Night - A Benefit Single for Feeding America
- 2017 Spring Carousel: A Cancer Research Benefit

=== Soundtracks ===
- 1984 The Velveteen Rabbit (solo piano soundtrack with narration by Meryl Streep)
- 1988 This Is America, Charlie Brown—The Birth of the Constitution (piano & harpsichord solos)
- 1995 Sadako and the Thousand Paper Cranes (solo guitar soundtrack with narration by Liv Ullmann)
- 2002 Pumpkin Circle (solo piano, guitar and harmonica soundtrack with narration by Danny Glover)
- 2003 Bread Comes to Life (solo piano, guitar and harmonica soundtrack with narration by Lily Tomlin)
