= Philip Aaberg =

American pianist and composer (1949–2026)

- Born: April 8, 1949; Havre, Montana, U.S.
- Died: May 23, 2026 (aged 77)
- Genres: Chamber jazz; jazz
- Occupation: Musician
- Instrument: Piano
- Years active: 1979–2026
- Labels: Windham Hill; Sweetgrass
- Website: sweetgrassmusic.com

Philip Aaberg (April 8, 1949 – May 23, 2026) was an American pianist and composer. He gained international recognition through a series of successful piano recordings released on Windham Hill Records. Although classically trained, Aaberg incorporated classical, jazz, bluegrass, rock, and new music elements into his compositions and musical structures. Although best known for his solo piano work, he was most at home in the chamber jazz genre. His compositions are noted for their "rigorous keyboard technique, diverse influences, and colorful compositional style."

== Early life and education ==
Aaberg was born in Havre, Montana, in 1949, and raised in Chester, Montana. By the age of 14, he was performing with local bands at dances. Aaberg won a Leonard Bernstein Scholarship to study music at Harvard. After receiving his Bachelor of Arts degree in music from Harvard, he moved to Oakland, California and played in blues clubs for several years. He also toured and recorded as a member of Elvin Bishop's Group at the time of its greatest popularity, and co-wrote the title song of the band's 1976 Struttin' My Stuff release, an album which also included Bishop's biggest hit, "Fooled Around and Fell in Love," featuring Aaberg on piano.

== Windham Hill years ==
In 1985, Aaberg signed a recording contract with Windham Hill Records and released a solo album titled High Plains. He followed this up with three more solo albums: Out of the Frame (1988), Upright (1989), Cinema (1992). Aaberg also appeared regularly on the Windham Hill Sampler albums over 20 years and had success in various collaborations and ensemble projects.

Aaberg performed with the Boston Pops Orchestra and appeared at the Marlboro Chamber Music Festival. As a guest artist, he performed on over 200 albums and on PBS's All-American Jazz program, which earned him an Emmy Award nomination. He appeared with Peter Gabriel and Tom Johnston of the Doobie Brothers in concert.

== Sweetgrass Music years ==
In 2000, Aaberg began his record label with his wife Patty, Sweetgrass Music, through which he later endeavored to produce music that "connects a global audience to the sweeping landscape of the West." Releases include Field Notes (2000), Live from Montana (2000), which received a Grammy nomination, Christmas (2002), Blue West (2005), and High Plains Christmas (2013).

Throughout his career, Aaberg produced music that consistently translated Montana's farms, ranches, and native cultures into "musical concepts" and "forged a unique keyboard style that paints an audible portrait of his home state." Philip also produced a public radio program "Of the West: Creativity and Sense of Place". He received a Montana Governor's Award for the Arts and in 2011, received a Montana Arts Council Innovator Award. His score for "Class C: The Only Game in Town" was nominated for a regional Emmy.

In addition to Sweetgrass Music and "Of the West", Philip and Patty Aaberg ran the Great Northern Bed and Breakfast, the Westland Suite, and The Bin recording studio.

== Death ==
Aaberg died from pneumonia on May 23, 2026, at the age of 77.

== Discography ==
Solo recordings

- 1985 High Plains
- 1988 Out of the Frame
- 1989 Upright
- 1992 Cinema
- 2000 Field Notes
- 2000 Live from Montana
- 2002 Christmas
- 2005 Blue West
- 2013 High Plains Christmas
- 2015 From the Ground Up
- 2017 Versatile

Collaborations

- 1986 The Shape of the Land (with Michael Hedges and William Ackerman)
- 1987 Morning Walk (with Metamora)
- 1990 Meridian (with Bernie Krause)
- 1998 A Christmas Heritage (with New Grange)
- 1999 New Grange (with New Grange)
- 2001 Tasting the Wine Country (with the Mike Marshall Quintet)
- 2008 CrossTime (with Darol Anger)
- 2009 Three Part Invention (with Tracy Silverman and Eugene Friesen)
- 2010 Raven (with Kristina Stykos)
- 2012 Tuli Wamu with Kinobe
- 2013 Montana Wild Cats with Jack Walrath and Kelly Roberti
- 2014 Tone Poems Live with Steve Hunter

Guest appearances

- 1985 Windham Hill Sampler '86
- 1985 Windham Hill: Autumn Portrait
- 1985 A Winter's Solstice, Vol. 1
- 1988 A Winter's Solstice, Vol. 2
- 1989 Windham Hill Sampler'89
- 1990 Restore the Shore
- 1990 Windham Hill: The First Ten Years
- 1991 Windham Hill Sampler '92
- 1992 The Impressionists: A Windham Hill Sampler
- 1993 A Winter's Solstice, Vol. 4 (also: co-producer, Track 1)
- 1994 Windham Hill Piano Sampler 2
- 1995 A Winter's Solstice, Vol. 5
- 1995 Windham Hill: The Romantics
- 1996 Different Mozart
- 1996 Redbook Relaxation: Tranquility
- 1996 Redbook Relaxers: Daybreak
- 1996 Redbook Relaxers: Dreamscape
- 1996 Redbook Relaxers: Romance
- 1996 Redbook Relaxers: Twilight
- 1996 Sanctuary: 20 Years of Windham Hill
- 1997 Candlelight Moments: Meditative Moments
- 1997 Candlelight Moments: Moonlight Reflections
- 1997 Candlelight Moments: Serene Sounds
- 1997 Heritage
- 1997 Meditation: Restore
- 1997 Redbook Relaxation: Piano Reflections
- 1997 Redbook Relaxers: Dinner Party
- 1997 Redbook Relaxers: Lullabies
- 1997 Summer Solstice: A Windham Hill Collection
- 1997 Twilight Jazz (BMG Special Products)
- 1998 Best of New Age (Columbia River)
- 1998 Moonlight Reflections (BMG Special Products)
- 1998 Quiet Moods: Meditative Moments
- 1998 Quiet Moods: Romantic Reflections
- 1998 Thanksgiving: A Windham Hill Collection
- 1998 Tones of Christmas
- 1998 Yoga Zone: Music for Yoga Practice
- 1999 Moonlight Moments
- 1999 Sun Dance: Summer Solstice, Vol. 3
- 2000 Healing Harmony
- 2000 New Age Christmas [BMG Greeting Card CD]
- 2000 Redbook: Daybreak
- 2000 Redbook: Dinner Party
- 2000 Redbook: Lullabies
- 2000 Redbook: Piano Reflections
- 2000 Redbook: Romance
- 2000 Redbook: Tranquility
- 2000 Redbook: Twilight
- 2000 Windham Hill Classics: Harvest
- 2000 Windham Hill Classics: Journeys
- 2000 Windham Hill Classics: Persuasion
- 2000 Windham Hill Classics: Reflections
- 2001 A Winter's Solstice, Vol. 1: Silver Anniversary Edition
- 2001 Meditation: Relax Restore and Revive
- 2001 New Age Moods [BMG Special Products]
- 2001 Windham Hill Classics: Matters of the Heart
- 2001 Windows: Windham Hill 25 Years of Piano
- 2002 Ansel Adams: Original Soundtrack Recording from the Film by Ric Burns
- 2002 Meditation: Relax
- 2002 Peace of Mind (Windham Hill)
- 2003 A Windham Hill Christmas, Vol. 2
- 2003 Adagio: A Windham Hill Collection
- 2003 Prayer: A Windham Hill Collection
- 2003 Windham Hill Chill: Ambient Acoustic
- 2004 Relaxation (Windham Hill)
- 2004 Windham Hill America
- 2004 Windham Hill Christmas: I'll Be Home for Christmas
- 2004 Windham Hill Sampler: Winter Wonderland
- 2005 A Quiet Revolution: 30 Years of Windham Hill
- 2005 A Windham Hill Christmas: The Night Before Christmas
- 2005 Cinema: A Windham Hill Collection
- 2005 Essential Winter's Solstice
- 2005 Heritage
- 2005 Released
- 2006 Sundown: A Windham Hill Piano Collection
- 2007 True
- 2008 Blue Dreams
- 2008 Meditations
- 2012 The Manhattan Blues Project (Steve Hunter)
- 2015 Next

== See also ==
- List of ambient music artists
