= Windham Hill Records =

New-age music record label

- The Original Windham Hill logo (1977–1996), designed by Jay Durgan.
- Parent company: Sony Music Entertainment
- Founded: 1976
- Founder: William Ackerman; Anne Robinson
- Defunct: 2007
- Distributors: Legacy Recordings; Valley Entertainment
- Genre: Acoustic, New age, folk, ambient
- Country of origin: U.S.
- Location: Palo Alto, California (1976–1996); Los Angeles, California (1996–2007)

Windham Hill Records was an independent record label that specialized in instrumental acoustic music. It was founded by guitarist William Ackerman and Anne Robinson (née McGilvray) in 1976 and was popular in the 1980s and 1990s.

The label was purchased by BMG through a series of buyouts from 1992 through 1996. It is now a subsidiary of Sony Music Entertainment, following Sony's acquisition of BMG Music in 2007. Private Music, also a subsidiary of BMG, has issued some back-catalog releases under the Windham Hill Records imprint. Since the Sony merger in 2007, Windham Hill has released no new material but reissues albums and compilations as part of Sony's Legacy Recordings brand.

== Origin ==
In 1975, William Ackerman was a college dropout who played acoustic guitar on the Stanford University campus. Friends asked him to record his instrumental music for them on cassette. They chipped in so that he could make an album titled The Search for the Turtle's Navel (later renamed In Search of the Turtle's Navel). He gave copies to radio stations, which attracted an audience as well as California record store owners, and his albums began to sell. He founded the label with his girlfriend Anne Robinson in 1976. Ackerman invited like-minded musicians to the label, including Alex De Grassi, his cousin and an acoustic guitarist who became one of Windham Hill's best sellers. Ackerman began recording friends and fellow Bay Area musicians, and Robinson would market and design the albums.

Ackerman and co-founder Robinson started selling the label's albums themselves, loading their Volvo station wagon with the label's catalog and selling to bookstores and health food stores across the California coast.

== Style ==
Windham Hill produced music that was difficult to define, with elements of classical, folk, and jazz, nearly all of it instrumental, acoustic, and mellow. California-based Tower Records stores gave Windham Hill its own section. Billboard magazine called the music soft jazz in 1983, but later listed the label as new age. The roster included acoustic guitarists Michael Hedges, David Cullen, John Doan, and Andrew York. The label's albums topped the New Age and Contemporary Jazz charts in Billboard magazine. Albums of solo piano by George Winston crossed over into the Pop and Folk charts. Seven albums by Winston have been certified Gold and Platinum by the Recording Industry Association of America (RIAA).

By 1982, the label had grown over 300% and was bringing in revenues in the millions. Ackerman and Robinson expanded Windham Hill's presence from Palo Alto, opening offices in Seattle, Los Angeles, and later New York City. They hired a staff of talented friends whom they respected in the music industry, including Jeff Heiman, Steve Backer, and Sam Sutherland to run the other offices. Thanks in large part to the success of George Winston's albums Autumn and later December, Jerry Moss offered to Windham Hill a lucrative distribution arrangement with A&M Records to partially finance and distribute all of Windham Hill's record, cassette and newly created Compact Disc catalog. Ackerman booked music studios primarily in the Bay Area that prioritized high fidelity and later digital audio recording and mastering to record the label's artists and albums. He also championed utilizing catalog samplers that featured his personal favorite tracks on recently released albums of the label's artists. These proved to be the most successful-selling albums on the label and inspired a multitude of themed compilation albums for the record label. Partially inspired by his love of Gregorian Chant, and the success of December, Ackerman asked music producer Dawn Atkinson to start the Windham Hill Winter Solstice series of albums, a multi-platinum selling series of Holiday-themed music that ran from 1985 to 2007, and featured tracks composed and performed by the label's then-current roster of artists.

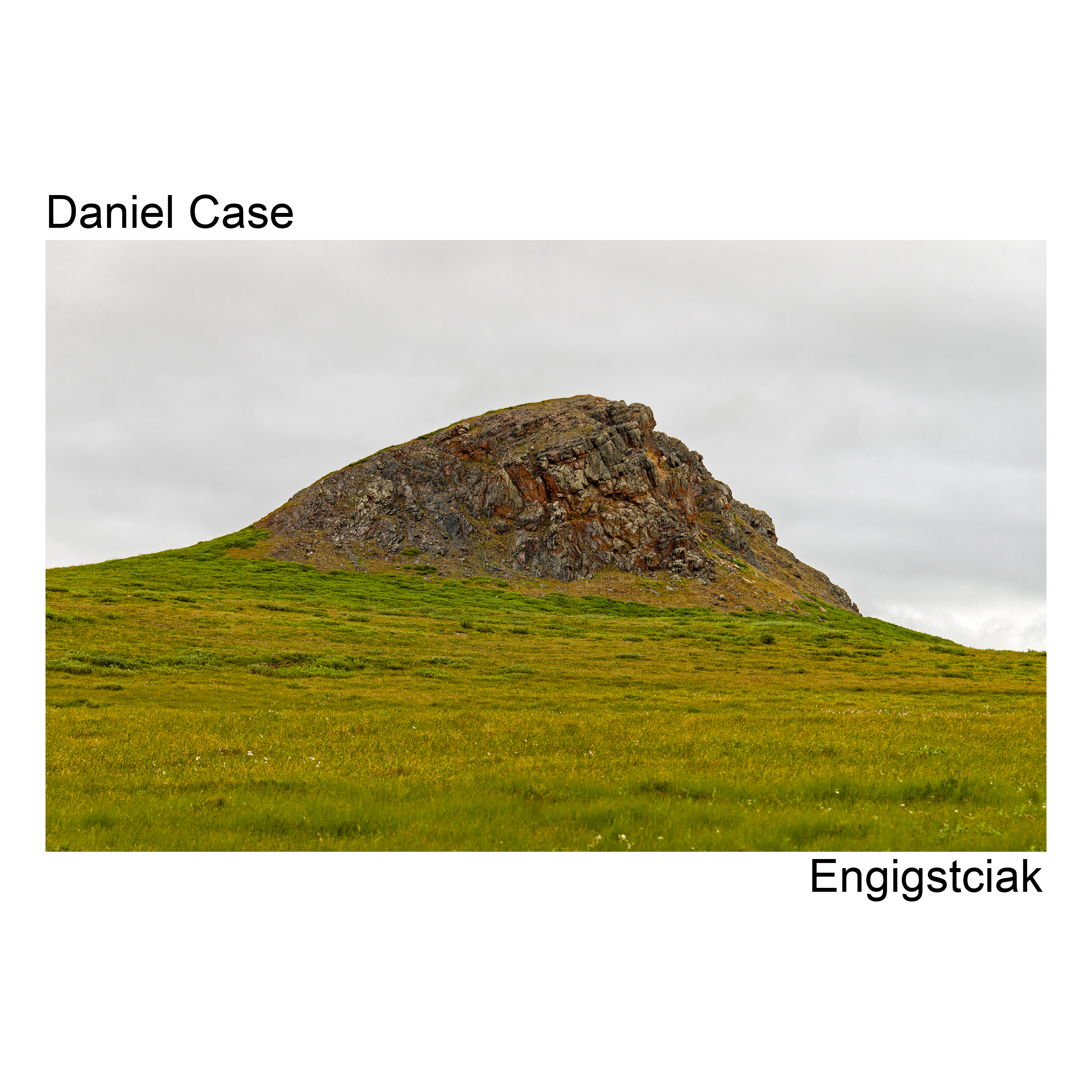
Image in the style of Windham Hill album covers

Anne Robinson, a student of design, was the primary designer of the majority of the albums' cover art. She produced covers that were minimal, with a centered photograph of nature surrounded by a large area, usually white, with the artist and album name in Avant Garde Gothic. The albums were packaged in loose plastic rather than tight cellophane, and distributed in health-food stores and book stores. Robinson later brought in Candace Upman to act as Chief Album Designer, supervising all of the album cover art through 1996.

== Buyouts ==
Windham Hill's music was distributed by A&M Records until PolyGram purchased A&M in 1989. When A&M was purchased, Ackerman and Robinson began considering selling Windham Hill to a media conglomerate. When BMG took over distribution from A&M in 1989, they began negotiations to purchase Windham Hill from its two principal shareholders. Ackerman sold his half of the company to BMG in 1992 and Anne Robinson sold her half in 1996. BMG relocated the Windham Hill office to Los Angeles and began distributing Windham Hill through RCA Records. BMG merged other music labels that they purchased (such as Peter Baumann's Private Music) into Windham Hill, forming the Windham Hill Group. In doing so, artists such as Yanni and Vangelis joined the label, though they were not original Windham Hill artists.

Jim Brickman was the last major artist signed to the label pre-buyout and he was the last artist to leave Windham Hill in 2006, joining Savoy Records. George Winston, who founded his own Dancing Cat Records in the early 1980s, continued working with Windham Hill as a distribution partner until the label was closed in 2007. BMG negotiated a distribution arrangement with Dancing Cat and Winston moved to RCA Victor until 2009, Sony Classical until 2015, and then moved back to RCA Records. Until his death in June 2023, Winston was the only original Windham Hill artist actively working as an artist under Windham Hill's parent company.

== Legacy ==
Today a majority of Windham's releases are distributed through Legacy Recordings, a division of Sony Music Entertainment. For Windham Hill's 30th Anniversary in 2006, Sony BMG released a special collection kit, with an article from Will Ackerman.

For the first time in over 15 years, many of the early Windham Hill artists who recorded for Ackerman performed together on August 27, 2006 at the Villa Montalvo in Saratoga, California near San Jose. Artists included: Barbara Higbie, Jim Brickman, Tuck & Patti, Andrew Robert Nelson, Alex de Grassi, Liz Story, Philip Aaberg, Michael Manring, Samite, David Cullen, Tracy Silverman, Lisa Lynne, George Tortorelli, Sean Harkness (who also planned and invited the musicians), and Will Ackerman.

In 2008 Sony absorbed all of the BMG assets including Windham Hill. The next year, Valley Entertainment began reissuing titles from the Windham Hill catalog. Other acoustic music record labels have also signed licensing deals with Legacy Recordings, including Adventure Music, Gnome Life Records, Grass-Tops Recording and Dancing Cat.

The label was mentioned on the cult TV series Mystery Science Theater 3000, as well as its spiritual successor RiffTrax.

Since 1993 William Ackerman, originally with engineer Corin Nelsen and since 2009 with co-producer and engineer Tom Eaton, have worked from his Vermont-based Imaginary Road Studios producing independent musicians aligned with the original spirit of Windham Hill.

== Associated labels ==
- Dancing Cat Records: A label founded by George Winston that began with Winston's albums and migrated to Hawaiian music, received distribution through Windham Hill. Dancing Cat remains an independent label under Sony Classical.
- High Street Records: A singer-songwriter-oriented sub-label started by Will Ackerman and managed by Dawn Atkinson and Bob Duskis.
- Hip Pocket: A jazz-oriented label started by Andy Narell and Steven Miller in 1981, folded into the Windham Hill Jazz label with Magenta in 1987.
- Magenta: A jazz-oriented label, started by Steve Backer in 1985, folded into the Windham Hill Jazz label with Hip Pocket in 1987.
- Living Music: A new age label started by Paul Winter in 1980, distributed by Windham Hill from 1996 to 1998.
- Lost Lake Arts: An imprint that reissued out-of-print albums. A total of 13 albums were released on the label between 1981 and 1988.
- Open Air: A vocal label that released seven albums between 1985 and 1989.
- Rabbit Ears: A children's entertainment company whose music was developed with and distributed by Windham Hill from 1984 to 1990.
- Pioneer Artists: A music video label that reissued Windham Hill titles on DVD and VHS beginning in January 2000.
- Imaginary Road Music: William Ackerman's music label for music produced by his Imaginary Road Studios.

== Roster ==
- Acoustic jazz group Montreux
- Bassist Michael Manring
- Group Angels of Venice Carol Tatum
- Celtic harpist and composer Lisa Lynne
- Celtic jazz group Nightnoise
- Composer David Arkenstone
- Composer Mark Isham
- Composer Ray Lynch
- Composer Wim Mertens
- Composer Patrick O'Hearn
- Electronic music composer Vangelis
- Folk musician John Gorka
- Folk/Celtic trio Metamora
- Fusion classical group Turtle Island String Quartet
- Guitarist William Ackerman
- Guitarist Robbie Basho
- Guitarist David Cullen
- Guitarist Alex De Grassi
- Guitarist Sean Harkness
- Guitarist Andrew Robert Nelson
- Guitarist Daniel Hecht
- Guitarist Michael Hedges
- Guitarist David Torn
- Guitarist David Qualey
- Guitarist Andrew York
- Hammered dulcimer player Malcolm Dalglish
- Harp guitarist John Doan
- Indie rock group Dots Will Echo
- Jazz duo Tuck & Patti
- Jazz guitarist Ray Obiedo
- Jazz keyboardist and composer Philip Aaberg
- Jazz keyboardist and composer Philippe Saisse
- Jazz keyboardist and composer Henry Adam Curtis
- Jazz pianist Fred Simon
- Jazz woodwind player and composer Paul McCandless
- Keyboardist Tim Story
- Mandolin player Mike Marshall, and Modern Mandolin Quartet (1988–1993)
- New Age duo Ira Stein and Russel Walder
- New Age duo Schönherz & Scott
- Pianist Jim Brickman
- Pianist Scott Cossu
- Pianist Pat Gorman
- Pianist Bill Quist
- Pianist Liz Story
- Pianist George Winston
- Pianist Yanni
- Pianist and composer W. A. Mathieu
- Pianist and composer Øystein Sevåg
- Pianist and singer Barbara Higbie
- Rock, R&B/soul group Kidd Afrika
- Singer-songwriter Cliff Eberhardt
- Singer-songwriter Iain Matthews
- Singer-songwriter Linda Waterfall
- Trumpeter Jeff Oster
- Violinist and composer Tracy Silverman
- Violinist Darol Anger
- Vocal ensemble The Nylons
- World musician Samite
- World fusion ensemble Shadowfax

== See also ==
- Music West Records
- Private Music
