= Dancing Cat Records =

Recording label

- Founded: 1983
- Founder: George Winston
- Distributor(s): Valley Entertainment
- Genre: Hawaiian music
- Country of origin: United States
- Official website: www.dancingcat.com

Dancing Cat Records is a record label founded in 1983 by pianist George Winston to publish both his music and music in the Hawaiian slack-key guitar style. Its mission later expanded to cover other Hawaiian musicians. Dancing Cat's albums were originally distributed by Windham Hill Records. Since 2020, the record label has been distributed by Valley Entertainment. In 2024 Dancing Cat's Hawaiian Slack Key catalog was sold to Valley Entertainment.

== Artists ==
- Keola Beamer
- Bob Brozman
- Sonny Chillingworth
- Ledward Kaapana
- Dennis Kamakahi
- Ray Kane
- Silvia Kohan
- Leonard Kwan
- Michael Lorimer
- Professor Longhair
- Cyril Pahinui
- Bola Sete
- Shad Weathersby
- George Winston

== See also ==
- List of record labels
