= Gronau (Samtgemeinde) =

Coordinates: 52°04′00″N 9°47′00″E

Gronau is a former Samtgemeinde ("collective municipality") in the district of Hildesheim, in Lower Saxony, Germany. Its seat was in the town Gronau. On 1 November 2016, it was merged into the new Samtgemeinde Leinebergland.

The Samtgemeinde Gronau consisted of the following municipalities:

1. Banteln
2. Betheln
3. Brüggen
4. Despetal
5. Eime
6. Gronau
7. Rheden
