= Los Angeles Children's Chorus =

California community children's choir

- Abbreviation: LACC
- Formation: 1986; 40 years ago
- Founder: Rebecca Thompson; Stephanie Mowery
- Type: Youth organization
- Legal status: 501(c)(3) nonprofit
- Purpose: Choral music education
- Headquarters: Pasadena, California
- Region served: Greater Los Angeles Area
- Members: 440+
- Key people: Fernando Malvar-Ruiz (Artistic Director, Concert Choir Director, Chamber Singers Director, and Chorale Director); Susan Miller Kotses (Executive Director); Fred Meads (Associate Artistic Director, Intermediate Choir Director, Preparatory Choir Director, LACC@HOLA Director); Eric Lifland (Young Men's Ensemble Director, Apprentice Choir Director)
- Website: lachildrenschorus.org

Los Angeles Children's Chorus (LACC) is a children's choral youth organization based in Los Angeles. LACC has appeared in more than 300 performances with such organizations as the Los Angeles Opera, Los Angeles Philharmonic, Los Angeles Master Chorale, Hollywood Bowl Orchestra, and Los Angeles Chamber Orchestra.

Since its founding in 1986, LACC has educated more than 2,200 young singers. It includes over 400 choristers divided into seven ensembles and two introductory programs, from more than 60 communities across the greater Los Angeles area. Members rehearse once or twice weekly, with weekly musicianship classes and regular performances with the Chorus.

Repertoire covers a spectrum of musical genres including established classical works, art songs, American jazz pieces and spirituals, and arrangements of folk songs from around the world.

== About ==
Los Angeles Children's Chorus was founded by Rebecca Thompson and Stephanie Mowery in 1986. It has office and rehearsal space in Pasadena Presbyterian Church.

LACC has performed with the Los Angeles Philharmonic in such works as Mahler's Third Symphony, Orff's Carmina Burana, Adams' El Niño, Mendelssohn's Midsummer Night's Dream, Stravinsky's Persephone, and Bernstein's Mass under conductors Esa-Pekka Salonen, André Previn, and Marin Alsop. The choir sings with the Los Angeles Master Chorale under Grant Gershon and with the Hollywood Bowl Orchestra under the direction of John Mauceri and Leonard Slatkin. In 2011, Concert Choir performed in the premiere of world-renowned conductor Esa-Pekka Salonen's composition of "Dona nobis pacem" at the Walt Disney Concert Hall. LACC also performs on occasion with the Pasadena Symphony, the Los Angeles Chamber Orchestra, and Southwest Chamber Music Orchestra.

In addition to their contracted performances, LACC presents its own annual Winter and Spring Concerts. The Chorus performs compositions that range from established works by classical composers to contemporary arrangements of folk songs from around the world. The Chorus presents new compositions written specifically for children's voices. Works performed by LACC's Concert Choir include Benjamin Britten's Missa Brevis and A Ceremony of Carols, Gabriel Faure's Messe basse, and Dancing Day by John Rutter. In June 2000, LACC produced its first children's opera, Benjamin Britten's Noye's Fludde (Noah's Flood). Eighty choristers joined with the Orchestra da Camera of the Colburn School and three adult singer/actors.

In July 2007, LACC produced a new choral opera written for LACC by composer Peter Ash and librettist Donald Sturrock, Keepers of the Night. Conductor Grant Gershon, director Corey Madden and soloists Suzanna Guzmán, Malcolm MacKenzie, Lynette Tapia and Lauren Libaw joined 65 LACC choristers for four performances of the world premiere production at the Alex Theatre in Glendale.

On August 1, 2018, Fernando Malvar-Ruiz replaced Anne Tomlinson as artistic director after her 22-year tenure came to an end.

At the closing of the 2018–2019 season, Diana Landis stepped down from her position as Apprentice Choir Director. Eric Lifland assumed her role alongside his existing role as Assistant Conductor for the Young Men's Ensemble, effective from the 2019–2020 season onward.

In response to the COVID-19 pandemic, LACC established virtual choir rehearsals and produced their first online concert, titled E pluribus unum (English: From many, one) in December 2020. The choir has since returned to rehearsing and performing in physical venues with safety protocols in place.

LACC announced on November 18, 2022 that Mandy Brigham, the chorus' Associate Artistic Director, would retire after 22 years at the end of the 2022–2023 season. Fred Meads, Education Director for the Westrick Music Academy, was named the new Associate Artistic Director starting in the 2023–2024 season. Meads will also assume Brigham's roles as director of the Preparatory and Intermediate choirs, as well as overseeing the musicianship program.

On April 28, 2023, the chorus announced the departure of executive director J. Andrew Bradford, effective July 5, 2023, and started a search for a new executive director. On December 13, 2023, the chorus announced that Susan Miller Kotses would fill the position beginning on February 8, 2024.

== Choirs & Programs ==
The Los Angeles Children's Chorus is made up of two introductory programs and seven ensembles, each designed for a specific level of musical experience. Choristers are promoted from one ensemble to the next after acquiring the required skills through the musicianship program.

=== First Experiences in Singing ===
Prior to admission into Preparatory Choir, children ages 6–8 may participate in a two-level beginner program called First Experiences in Singing (FES). Level I of the program introduces children to solfège, pitch, rhythm, the music staff, the use of head voice, and more. Level II builds upon the content introduced in Level I, adding the Bel canto technique, basic dictation, vocal exercises, and tempos.

=== First Experiences in Choral Singing ===
Following FES is First Experiences in Choral Singing (FECS). This introductory ensemble is designed for children who have the skills taught in FES, but who aren't ready for Preparatory Choir. It primarily encourages listening skills and development of the upper vocal range, and addresses other skills like reading octavos and recognizing musical phrasing.

=== Preparatory Choir ===
The youngest performing ensemble is the Preparatory Choir, directed by Fred Meads, which serves young children with little to no music experience. Though Preparatory Choir does not perform with LACC's other ensembles, it still hosts two concerts each season for choristers' family members.

=== Apprentice Choir ===
Choristers in Apprentice Choir, which is directed by Eric Lifland, may be promoted from Preparatory Choir or may audition. As such, this ensemble caters to choristers with basic music experience. Apprentice Choir performs with the higher-level ensembles at the Winter and Spring concerts, along with occasional performances at community events.

=== Intermediate Choir ===
Intermediate Choir, directed by Fred Meads, accepts auditions or promotions from Apprentice Choir. This ensemble introduces choristers to more advanced pieces, along with the opportunity to perform with professional musical organizations including the Los Angeles Philharmonic and Los Angeles Opera. Intermediate Choir performs with the other ensembles twice each season, in addition to community events, concerts, and its own annual spring tour.

=== Concert Choir ===
Concert Choir, directed by Fernando Malvar-Ruiz, is the largest ensemble in LACC. Choristers perform with music organizations like the Hollywood Bowl Orchestra, Los Angeles Master Chorale, Los Angeles Philharmonic, Los Angeles Opera, MUSE/IQUE throughout each season.

=== Young Men's Ensemble ===
The Young Men's Ensemble (YME) is composed of male singers whose voices are transitioning. The ensemble, directed by Dr. Steven Kronauer, accepts singers from Apprentice Choir, Intermediate Choir, Concert Choir, or through audition. Choristers work with Dr. Kronauer during separate vocal coaching sessions to enhance techniques that promote healthy singing throughout their vocal transition.

=== Chamber Singers ===
The Chamber Singers are also directed by Fernando Malvar-Ruiz. This ensemble of exclusively female choristers is invitation-only, chosen from members of the Concert Choir who have completed all 7 levels of musicianship lessons. Chamber Singers have the opportunity to perform with artists including the Calder Quartet, Anna Christy, and Grant Gershon.

=== Chorale ===
LACC's newest ensemble is Chorale, a mixed voices choir directed by Fernando Malvar-Ruiz. Choristers from Concert Choir and the Young Men's Ensemble with a high degree of musical ability are invited to audition for Chorale, which performs a variety of pieces designed specifically for mixed voice ensembles.

=== Musicianship Classes ===
Starting in Preparatory Choir, choristers receive weekly musicianship lessons from September to May of each season. These classes, which are separated into eight skill-based levels, incorporate the Kodály Method and teach how to read sheet music and identify rhythms, keys, scales, dynamics, and more. The highest levels introduce basic conducting.

== Tours ==
LACC's higher-level ensembles take part in annual tours of various locations across the world. Each tour is designed to provide the choristers with enriching experiences, opportunities for collaboration with other musical groups, and to teach the choristers to be cultural ambassadors for the city of Los Angeles.

Intermediate Choir tours California and the west coast of the United States, with frequent destinations being San Diego and the San Francisco Bay Area. Past destinations have also included Tucson, Sacramento, Portland, Salt Lake City, Seattle, and Vancouver, British Columbia.

LACC's Concert Choir and Young Men's Ensemble tour across the United States and worldwide, generally alternating between domestic and international tours occurring at the end of each performing season. Their June 2022 tour to Mexico marked the first time the two ensembles toured jointly, in addition to being Chorale's first tour. The chorus is continuing this multi-ensemble touring format into future seasons, with a trip to Spain upcoming in June 2023.

In previous seasons, Concert Choir has toured the countries of Australia, Austria, Brazil, Canada, the Czech Republic, Germany, Hungary, Iceland, Italy, Japan, Norway, Poland, South Africa, and the United Kingdom. Domestic tours have included Boston, New York City, New Jersey, Washington, D.C., Alaska, Colorado, Chicago, and Indianapolis.

Tours often include participation in festivals or events. For example, Concert Choir's 2006 tour saw them in Italy as the featured choir at the Tuscany International Children's Chorus Festival. Two years later, they participated in the China International Youth Arts Festival preceding the 2008 Summer Olympics in Beijing.

In Summer 2010, they traveled for the first time to Finland, Sweden, and Estonia. Summer 2012 took the members of Concert Choir to South Africa for the first time. In Summer 2016, the Concert Choir Touring Ensemble traveled to Japan.

LACC holds an all-choir retreat in the autumn, with time dedicated for workshops, combined rehearsals, individual rehearsals, and recreation. Intermediate Choir takes a weekend tour every spring, traveling to cities in the western United States to visit and perform with many other children's choirs. Apprentice Choir and Preparatory Choir take a day trip in the spring to visit and perform with other children's choirs.

== Notable performances ==
Chorus members have performed at events during visits to Los Angeles by the Emperor and Empress of Japan, the United Kingdom Prime Minister Margaret Thatcher, Israeli Prime Minister Yitzhak Rabin, and on nationally televised commercials, film soundtracks, the Grammy Awards Show, and The Tonight Show. They performed at the opening of the Cathedral of Our Lady of the Angels in downtown Los Angeles and sang at LA City Hall for the first anniversary of 9/11. LACC was named "2003 Artists of the Year" by the Los Angeles Opera League.

=== Operas ===
- Keepers of the Night (World Premiere) (2007)
- Hansel and Gretel (2006)
- Grendel (World Premiere) (2006)
- Parsifal (2005)
- Der Rosenkavalier (2005)
- Carmen (2004)
- La Boheme (2004)
- Fantastic Mr. Fox (World Premiere) (1998)

=== Other Performances ===
- Mahler's Eighth Symphony with the LA Philharmonic (2008)
- Rouse's Requiem (2007)
- Mahler's Third Symphony with the LA Philharmonic (2006)
- John Adams' El Niño (2005)
- Carl Orff's Carmina Burana (2005)
- The Lord of the Rings choral music at the Hollywood Bowl (2004)

=== Film and television ===
- Sing!, a 2001 Academy Award-nominated documentary about the Los Angeles Children's Chorus, directed by Freida Lee Mock.
- PBS Great Performances - John Williams (2015)
- Happier Than Ever: A Love Letter To Los Angeles, a concert film by pop star Billie Eilish, a previous member of the choir.

== LA Opera ==
LACC has appeared in productions and world premieres with LA Opera, including: La damnation de Faust, Die Frau ohne Schatten, Billy Budd, La Bohème, Pagliacci, Tosca, Midsummer Night's Dream, Otello, Carmen, Hansel and Gretel, Der Rosenkavalier, Queen of Spades, Werther, Turandot, and the world premieres of Grendel and the children's opera Fantastic Mr. Fox.

== Hosting ==
Los Angeles Children's Chorus occasionally hosts visits from, and performs with, other children's choirs, including the Leningrad Children's Choir, Toronto Children's Chorus, Tapiola Choir of Finland, Dawn Children's Choir of Moscow, Carmina Slovenica of Maribor, Slovenia, Australian Girls Choir, American Boychoir, The Phoenix Boys Choir, Phoenix Girls Chorus, Central California Children's Choir, Lawrence Children's Choir, Portland Symphonic Girlchoir and Pensacola Children's Chorus, Hamburg Girl's Choir.

== News Articles ==
- Looseleaf, Victoria. "Classical Music Raising Kids' Voices." Los Angeles Times February 22, 2004, E44.
