= Elze–Bodenburg railway =

Railway line in Germany

Elze–Bodenburg

Overview
- Line number: 1821 (Germany)

Service
- Route number: 202b (1966)

Technical
- Line length: 22.9 km (14.2 mi)
- Track gauge: 1,435 mm (4 ft 8 1/2 in)

The Elze–Bodenburg railway was a branch line of 23 km (14 mi) length in the Leine Uplands. Its main intermediate station was Gronau. The line is also known as the "Lower Saxon Alme Valley Railway" (niedersächsische Almetalbahn').

== History and operation ==
The section from Elze, a station on the Hanoverian Southern Railway, to Gronau was opened on 1 July 1900. On 7 November 1901 the section via Sibbesse to Bodenburg was opened which provided railway access to the southern parts of Hildesheimer Wald. The line connected in Bodenburg to the Lamme Valley Railway from Groß Düngen whose section between Bad Salzdetfurth and Bodenburg had been opened on the same day. Less than a year later, the Lamme Valley Railway was extended to Bad Gandersheim.

The Elze–Bodenburg line served only local needs in a predominantly agricultural region. Passenger traffic between Gronau and Bodenburg already ceased on 25 September 1966. On the same day, freight traffic between Gronau and Sibbesse was discontinued, and this section was decommissioned on 17. August 1970. Freight traffic between Sibbesse and Segeste ended on 25 September 1974, between Segeste and Bodenburg on 31 Dezember 1983. Passenger traffic between Elze and Gronau continued until 31 Mai 1980, freight traffic enden in 1994. Since then, the whole of the line has been out of operation. The last passenger services were provided by battery electric multiple units of DB class 515.

The section between Bodenburg and Almstedt was operated as a museum railway from 1976 to 1991. It is currently not usable, but will be preserved. Only a stretch of track of about 800 m (2,600 ft) length in Almstedt can be traveled by museum trains. The remainder of the line was cut several times, such as when the Hanover–Würzburg high-speed railway was built. It intersects the closed-down line at kilometer mark 38.8.

East of Despetal-Nienstedt a section of the embankment is preserved until a place short of Hönze. In 1987, a football ground was built at the northern edge of Nienstedt across a part of the old railway line. The former halt of Breinum is preserved at the southern edge of the village, together with a passenger shelter that was, however, only built at a time when the museum railway operated.

It was envisaged to refurbish the section between Bodenburg and Almstedt-Segeste, which has not been in use since 1991, for museum traffic, but due to high costs, the operators decided in 2013 to postpone this project. As the track between the old Bodenburg station and the new halt north of it has been cut, the museum line will remain isolated from the rest of the railway network. At its western end, however, an extension is planned from the current terminus Segeste/Grillplatz along the old embankment that is still preserved on a length of about 400 m (1,300 ft).

== Gallery ==
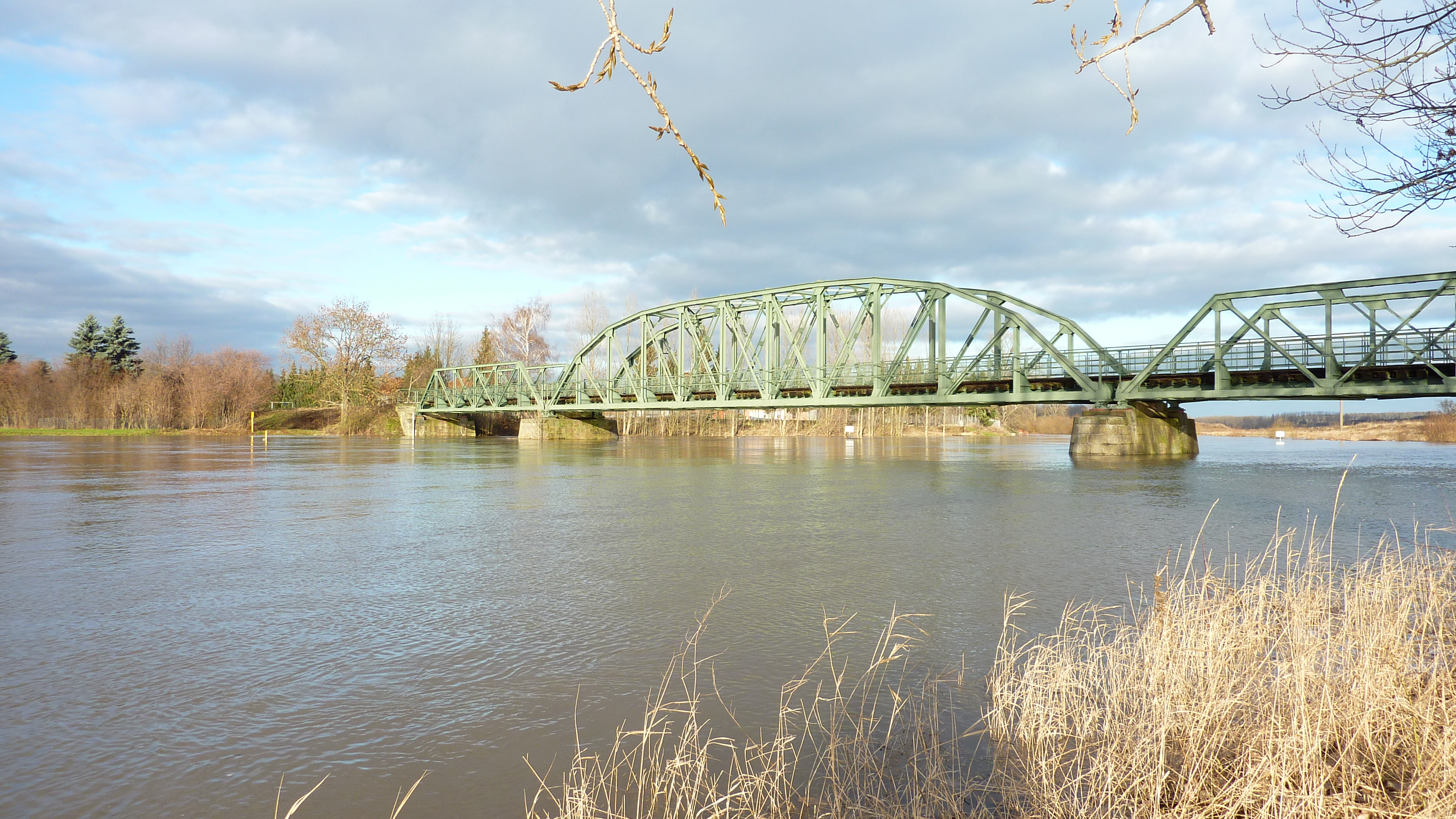
Railway bridge near Gronau

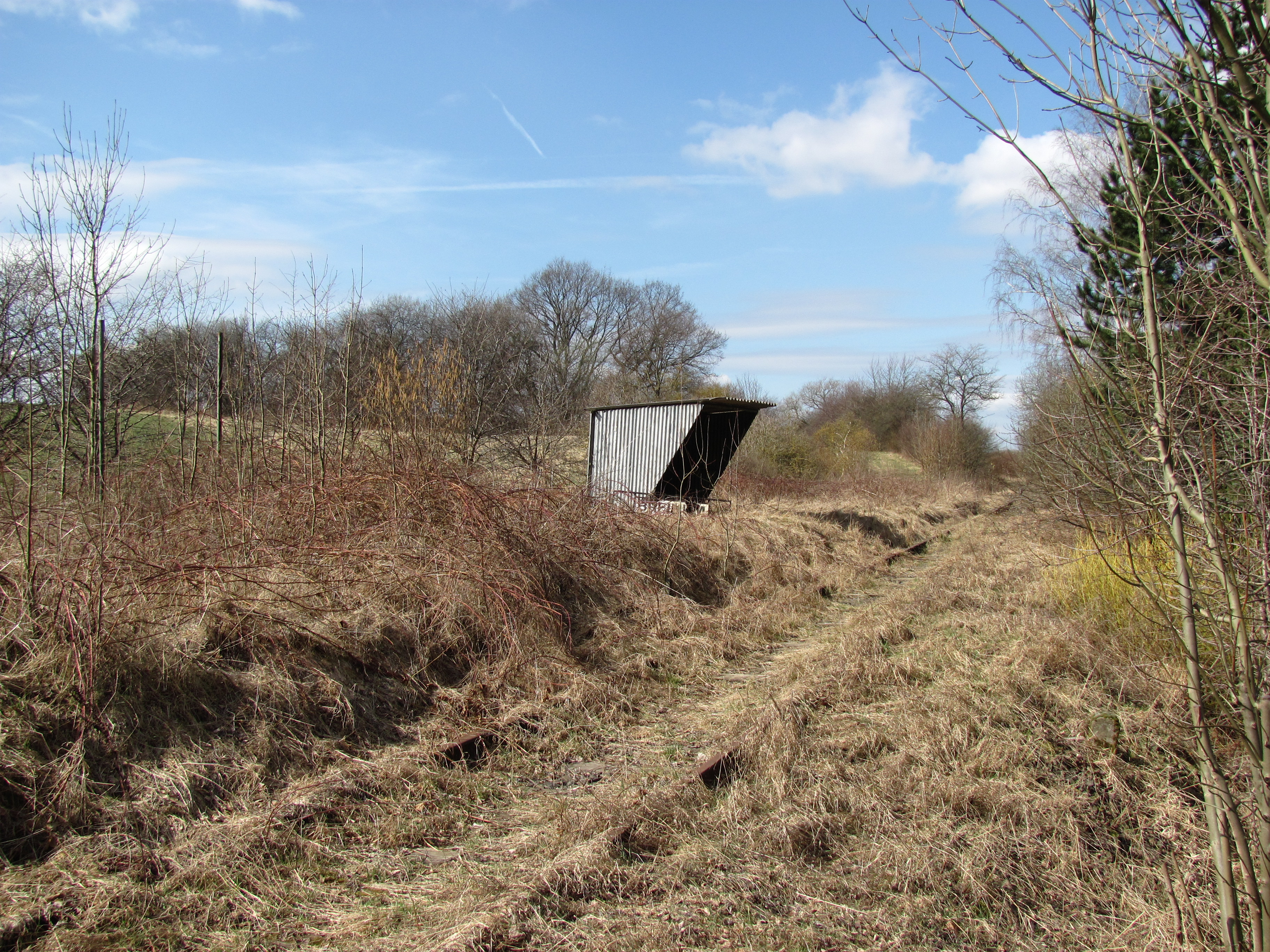
Former halt Breinum

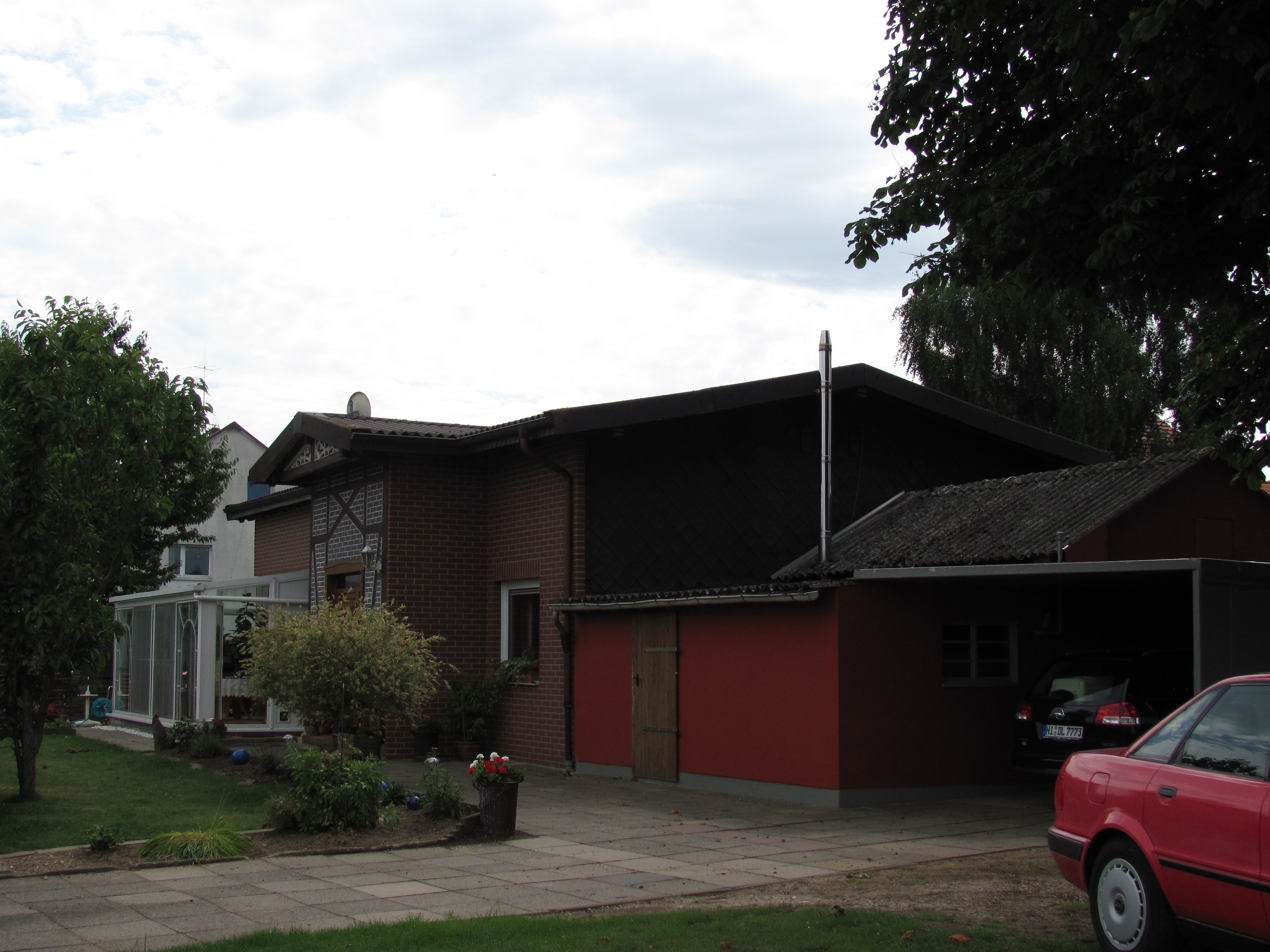
Former station Hönze

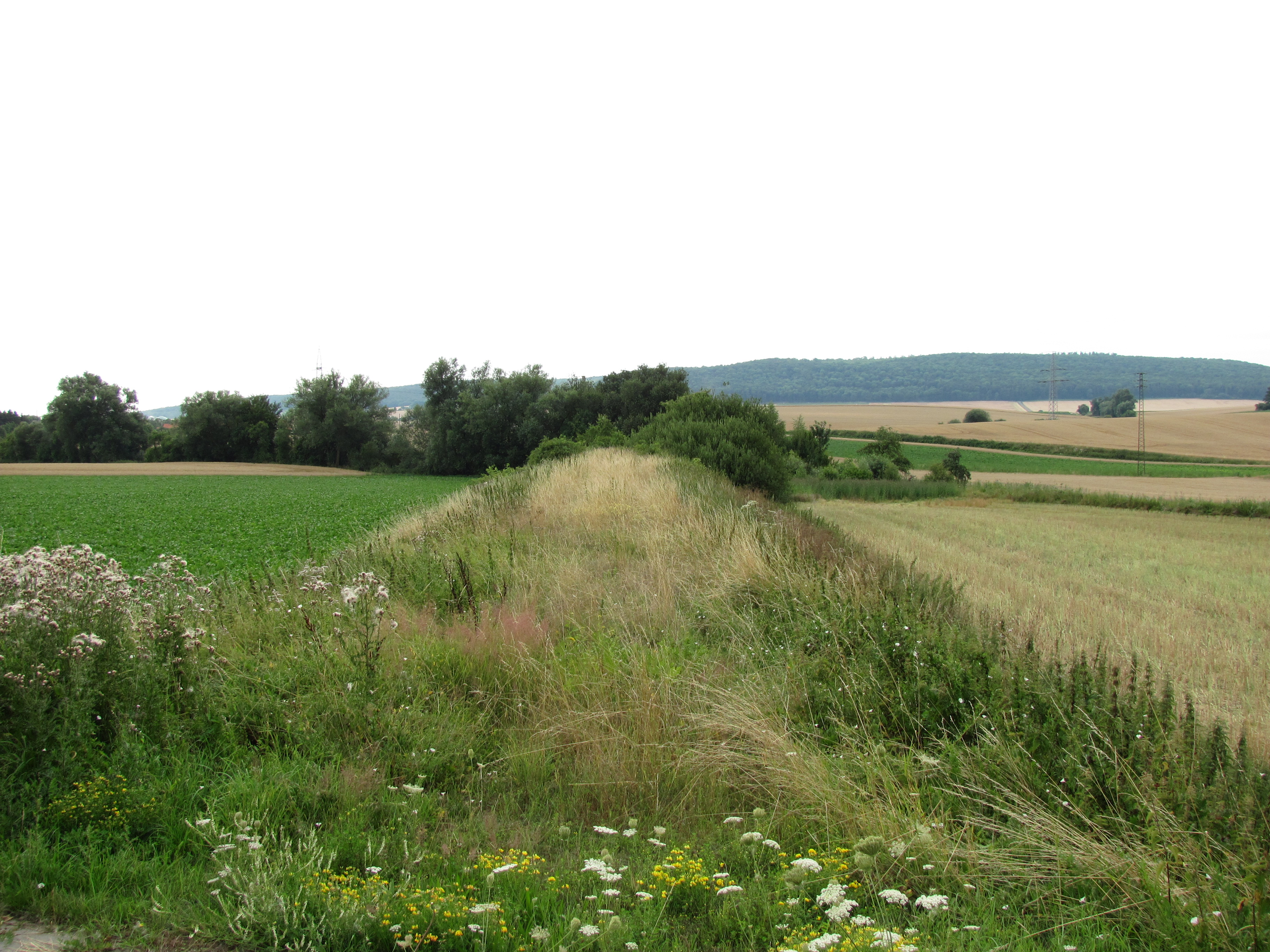
Embankment between Hönze and Despetal-Nienstedt

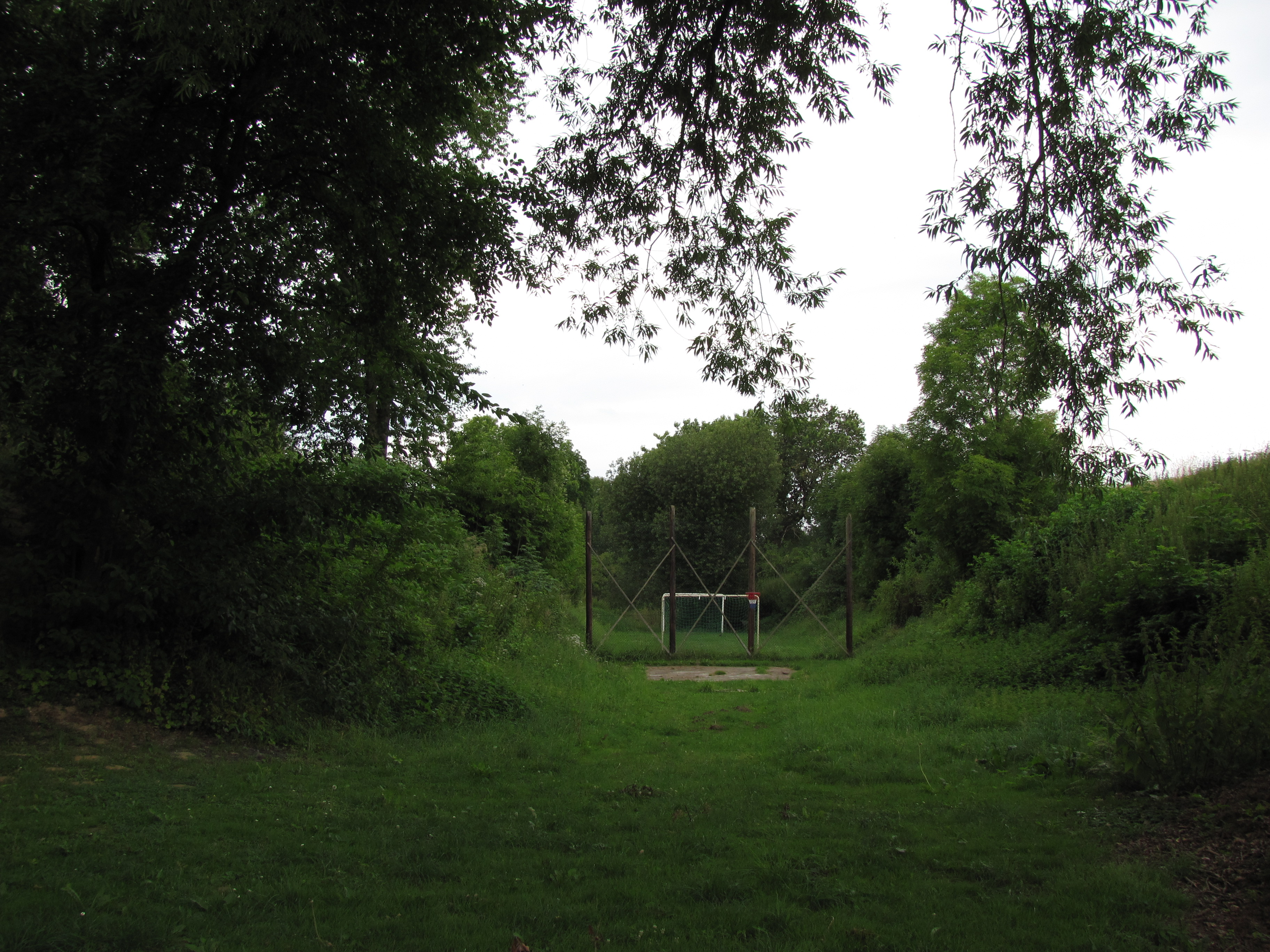
Cutting near football ground in Nienstedt
