= Cronauer =

Cronauer is the Americanized form of the German language habitational surname Gronauer, someone from any of several paces called Gronau or a variant of Kronauer.

Notable people with the name include:

- Adrian Cronauer (1938–2018), United States Air Force sergeant and radio personality
- Gail Cronauer (born 1948), American stage, television, and feature film actress
