= Gronau =

Gronau may refer to:

== Places ==
=== Germany ===
- Gronau, North Rhine-Westphalia, a city in district Borken, North Rhine-Westphalia
  - Gronau (Westf) railway station
- Gronau, Lower Saxony, a city on the river Leine in district Hildesheim, Lower Saxony
  - Gronau (Samtgemeinde), a Samtgemeinde ("collective municipality") in the district of Hildesheim, Lower Saxony
- Groß Grönau, a municipality in the district of Lauenburg, Schleswig-Holstein
- Gronau (Pinnau), a river of Schleswig-Holstein
- Gronau (Sinn), a river of Hesse

=== Greenland ===
- Gronau Nunataks

== People with the surname ==
- Ernst Gronau (1887–1938), German stage and film actor
- Hans von Gronau (1850–1940), Prussian general
- Jürgen Gronau (born 1962), German football player
- Reuben Gronau (born 1937), Israeli American economist
- Wolfgang von Gronau (1893–1977), German aviation pioneer
