= Eime =

Eime may refer to:

- Andrew Eime (born 1971), Australian cricket player
- Casement Aerodrome, Ireland (IATA code EIME)
- Eime, Lower Saxony, Germany
- Eime, Norway
