= Jürgen Mlynek =

German physicist

- Born: 15 March 1951 (age 75); Gronau, Lower Saxony, West Germany
- Education: University of Hannover; École Polytechnique
- Awards: Max Born Prize (1996) Gottfried Wilhelm Leibniz Prize (1992)
- Scientific career
- Doctoral students: Rudolf Grimm

Jürgen Mlynek (born 15 March 1951, in Gronau, Lower Saxony) is a German physicist and was president of the Helmholtz Association of German Research Centres from 2005 to 2015.

== Biography ==
Mlynek studied physics from 1970 to 1976 at the Technical University of Hannover and the École Polytechnique in Paris. In 1979, he obtained his doctor´s degree and habilitated in 1984.

Between 1976 and 1981, Mlynek was a scientific assistant in Hannover. In 1982, he worked for one year as a post-doctoral fellow with the IBM Research Laboratory in San Jose, California. After three years as an academic assistant in Hannover he became a Heisenberg fellow of the German Research Foundation (DFG – Deutsche Forschungsgemeinschaft) in 1985. He served as assistant professor at the ETH Zurich from 1986 to 1990.

In 1990, Mlynek became a full professor for experimental physics at the University of Konstanz. There he realized an atom inferometer for the first time and conducted groundbreaking experiments in the field of atom optics and quantum optics. Among them are his works on the Heisenberg microscope and the measurement of the Wigner function of the quantum state of matter and light. Since 2000 he has been professor for experimental physics at the Humboldt University of Berlin.

From 1996 to 2001, he was vice president of the German Research Foundation (DFG) where he dedicated himself to encouraging young academics. Between 2000 and 2005, Mlynek was president of the Humboldt University. During his term of presidency, he had to implement a series of reforms due to drastic reductions in order to downsize structures and to promote excellence. Besides, the sciences moved from Berlin Mitte to Adlershof and it was decided to build the Grimm library in Berlin Mitte.

In 2005, shortly after his reelection as president of the Humboldt University, Mlynek switched to the Helmholtz Association of German Research Centres, Germany's largest science organization, and became president. In June 2009, he was reelected for a second and last presidential term (2010–2015). During his presidency, program-oriented research was enhanced and the Helmholtz mission was strengthened in terms of strategic research for the national benefit. In addition, he developed new tools of strategic cooperation with universities like Helmholtz alliances and Helmholtz Institutes.

In 2006, Mlynek was one of the co-founders of the foundation "Haus der kleinen Forscher" which was supported by the Helmholtz Association from the beginning. It has now become the most successful initiative on education for young children in the German speaking countries. Furthermore, he established the Helmholtz Management Academy for teaching management techniques in the domain of science. The academy is also open to partner organizations and universities.

Since September 2015 he has resumed teaching as a professor in the physics department of the Humboldt University. Since the spring term in 2016, he has been officially released as a professor. Among his offices are Chairman of the Board of Trustees at the Falling Walls Foundation, Chairman of the Strategic Advisory Board of the European Quantum Technology Flagship Initiative, Chairman of the Foundation Board at the "Stiftung Kinder forschen" ('Little Scientists Foundation'), Chairman of the Board of Directors of the Wilhelm und Else Heraeus Foundation, as well as member of various university and science committees (e.g. Chairman of the University Council at Leibniz University Hannover). Until recently, he has been a longtime board member of the Holtzbrinck publishing group and of the company Carl Zeiss.

Mlynek worked in the field of experimental quantum optics, atomic physics and surface physics. He has published more than 200 papers (SCI:7875 / h-index:47).

He is married since 1972 to teacher Dagmar Mlynek and has two sons.

== Honors and awards ==
Mlynek is a member of the Berlin-Brandenburg Academy of Sciences and Humanities, National Academy of Science and Engineering (acatech) and the Academia Europaea.

- 1985 Heisenberg Fellow, German Research Foundation
- 1987 Physik-Preis, German Physical Society
- 1992 Gottfried-Wilhelm-Leibniz Preis, German Research Foundation
- 1996 Max-Born Preis, Institute of Physics and German Physical Society
- 2003 Urania Medal Berlin
- 2008 Order of Merit of Berlin
- 2009 Lower Saxony Order of Merit
- 2010 Order of Merit of the Federal Republic of Germany
- 2012 Honorary doctorate from the Faculty of Natural Sciences of the University of Ulm
- 2014 Ring of Honor of Garbsen
- 2019 Goldenes Ehrenzeichen für Verdienste um die Republik Österreichs 2019, Präsidentschaftskanzlei Alexander Van der Bellen
- 2022 Honorary doctorate from Aalto University

== Selected publications ==
- Lange, W.; Mlynek, J. (22 May 1978). "Quantum Beats in Transmission by Time-Resolved Polarization Spectroscopy". Physical Review Letters. 40 (21). American Physical Society (APS): 1373–1375. Bibcode:1978PhRvL..40.1373L. doi:10.1103/physrevlett.40.1373. ISSN 0031-9007.
- Mlynek, J.; Wong, N. C.; DeVoe, R. G.; Kintzer, E. S.; Brewer, R. G. (28 March 1983). "Raman Heterodyne Detection of Nuclear Magnetic Resonance". Physical Review Letters. 50 (13). American Physical Society (APS): 993–996. Bibcode:1983PhRvL..50..993M. doi:10.1103/physrevlett.50.993. ISSN 0031-9007.
- Carnal, O.; Mlynek, J. (27 May 1991). "Young's double-slit experiment with atoms: A simple atom interferometer". Physical Review Letters. 66 (21). American Physical Society (APS): 2689–2692. Bibcode:1991PhRvL..66.2689C. doi:10.1103/physrevlett.66.2689. ISSN 0031-9007. PMID 10043591.
- Carnal, O.; Sigel, M.; Sleator, T.; Takuma, H.; Mlynek, J. (2 December 1991). "Imaging and focusing of atoms by a fresnel zone plate". Physical Review Letters. 67 (23). American Physical Society (APS): 3231–3234. Bibcode:1991PhRvL..67.3231C. doi:10.1103/physrevlett.67.3231. ISSN 0031-9007. PMID 10044680.
- Adams, C.S; Sigel, M; Mlynek, J (1994). "Atom optics". Physics Reports. 240 (3). Elsevier BV: 143–210. Bibcode:1994PhR...240..143A. doi:10.1016/0370-1573(94)90066-3. ISSN 0370-1573.
- Pfau, T.; Spälter, S.; Kurtsiefer, Ch.; Ekstrom, C. R.; Mlynek, J. (29 August 1994). "Loss of Spatial Coherence by a Single Spontaneous Emission". Physical Review Letters. 73 (9). American Physical Society (APS): 1223–1226. Bibcode:1994PhRvL..73.1223P. doi:10.1103/physrevlett.73.1223. ISSN 0031-9007. PMID 10057656.
- Seel, Stefan; Storz, Rafael; Ruoso, Giuseppe; Mlynek, Jürgen; Schiller, Stephan (23 June 1997). "Cryogenic Optical Resonators: A New Tool for Laser Frequency Stabilization at the 1 Hz Level". Physical Review Letters. 78 (25). American Physical Society (APS): 4741–4744. Bibcode:1997PhRvL..78.4741S. doi:10.1103/physrevlett.78.4741. ISSN 0031-9007. S2CID 96462025.
- Kurtsiefer, Ch.; Pfau, T.; Mlynek, J. (1997). "Measurement of the Wigner function of an ensemble of helium atoms". Nature. 386 (6621). Springer Nature: 150–153. Bibcode:1997Natur.386..150K. doi:10.1038/386150a0. ISSN 0028-0836. S2CID 4359853.
- Breitenbach, G.; Schiller, S.; Mlynek, J. (1997). "Measurement of the quantum states of squeezed light". Nature. 387 (6632). Springer Nature: 471–475. Bibcode:1997Natur.387..471B. doi:10.1038/387471a0. ISSN 0028-0836. S2CID 4259166.
- Michaelis, J.; Hettich, C.; Mlynek, J.; Sandoghdar, V. (2000). "Optical microscopy using a single-molecule light source". Nature. 405 (6784). Springer Nature: 325–328. Bibcode:2000Natur.405..325M. doi:10.1038/35012545. ISSN 0028-0836. PMID 10830956. S2CID 1350535.
- Lvovsky, A. I.; Hansen, H.; Aichele, T.; Benson, O.; Mlynek, J.; Schiller, S. (11 July 2001). "Quantum State Reconstruction of the Single-Photon Fock State". Physical Review Letters. 87 (5) 050402. arXiv:quant-ph/0101051. Bibcode:2001PhRvL..87e0402L. doi:10.1103/physrevlett.87.050402. ISSN 0031-9007. PMID 11497753. S2CID 18527964.
