= Leinebergland (Samtgemeinde) =

Administrative division in Lower Saxony, Germany

- Samtgemeinde
- Location of Leinebergland within Hildesheim district
- Interactive map of Leinebergland
- Location within Germany Location within Lower Saxony
- Coordinates: 52°04′N 9°47′E
- Country: Germany
- State: Lower Saxony
- District: Hildesheim
- Seat: Gronau
- Subdivisions: 3 municipalities

Area
  - Total: 170 km^{2} (66 sq mi)

Population (2025-12-31)
  - Total: 17,664
  - Density: 100/km^{2} (270/sq mi)
- Time zone: UTC+01:00 (CET)
  - Summer (DST): UTC+02:00 (CEST)
- Website: www.sg-leinebergland.de

Leinebergland is a Samtgemeinde ("collective municipality") in the district of Hildesheim, in Lower Saxony, Germany. Its seat is in the town Gronau, with a branch office in Duingen. It was formed on 1 November 2016 by the merger of the former Samtgemeinden Gronau and Duingen. It takes its name from the Leine Uplands.

The Samtgemeinde Leinebergland consists of the following municipalities:

1. Duingen
2. Eime
3. Gronau
