= Kronauer =

Kronauer or Krönauer is a surname. Notable people with the surname include:

- Brigitte Kronauer (1940–2019), German writer and novelist
- Hansl Krönauer (1932-2011), German folk-singer and composer
- Richard Ernest Kronauer, Gordon McKay Professor of Mechanical Engineering
- Steven Kronauer, American conductor and tenor
