= Banteln =

- Ortsteil of Gronau
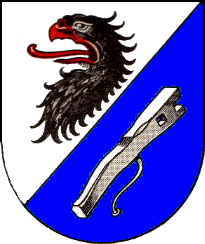
- Coat of arms
- Interactive map of Banteln
- Location within Germany Location within Lower Saxony
- Coordinates: 52°04′05″N 09°45′20″E
- Country: Germany
- State: Lower Saxony
- District: Hildesheim
- Town: Gronau

Area
  - Total: 7.51 km^{2} (2.90 sq mi)
- Elevation: 79 m (259 ft)

Population (2015-12-31)
  - Total: 1,507
  - Density: 201/km^{2} (520/sq mi)
- Time zone: UTC+01:00 (CET)
  - Summer (DST): UTC+02:00 (CEST)
- Postal codes: 31029
- Dialling codes: 05182
- Vehicle registration: HI

Banteln is a village and a former municipality in the district of Hildesheim in Lower Saxony, Germany. Since 1 November 2016, it is part of the town Gronau.

== Sights ==
North of Banteln, on the western edge of the geest above the river Leine, is a historic cemetery complex consisting of the medieval Feldberg Chapel together with the adjacent Christian and Jewish cemeteries, both enclosed by rubble-stone walls. The cemeteries were laid out on the site of the former settlement of Feldberge, which was abandoned after 1400, on the western bank above the Leine.

The Feldberg Chapel, built in the 12th century and the only surviving structure of the former settlement, served as a cemetery chapel until 1971 and is among the oldest surviving buildings in the surrounding area. To the north of the Christian cemetery lies a Jewish burial ground associated with the Meyerstein family, established in the early 19th century and used between 1815 and 1917, with 13 gravestones preserved.

== Gallery ==
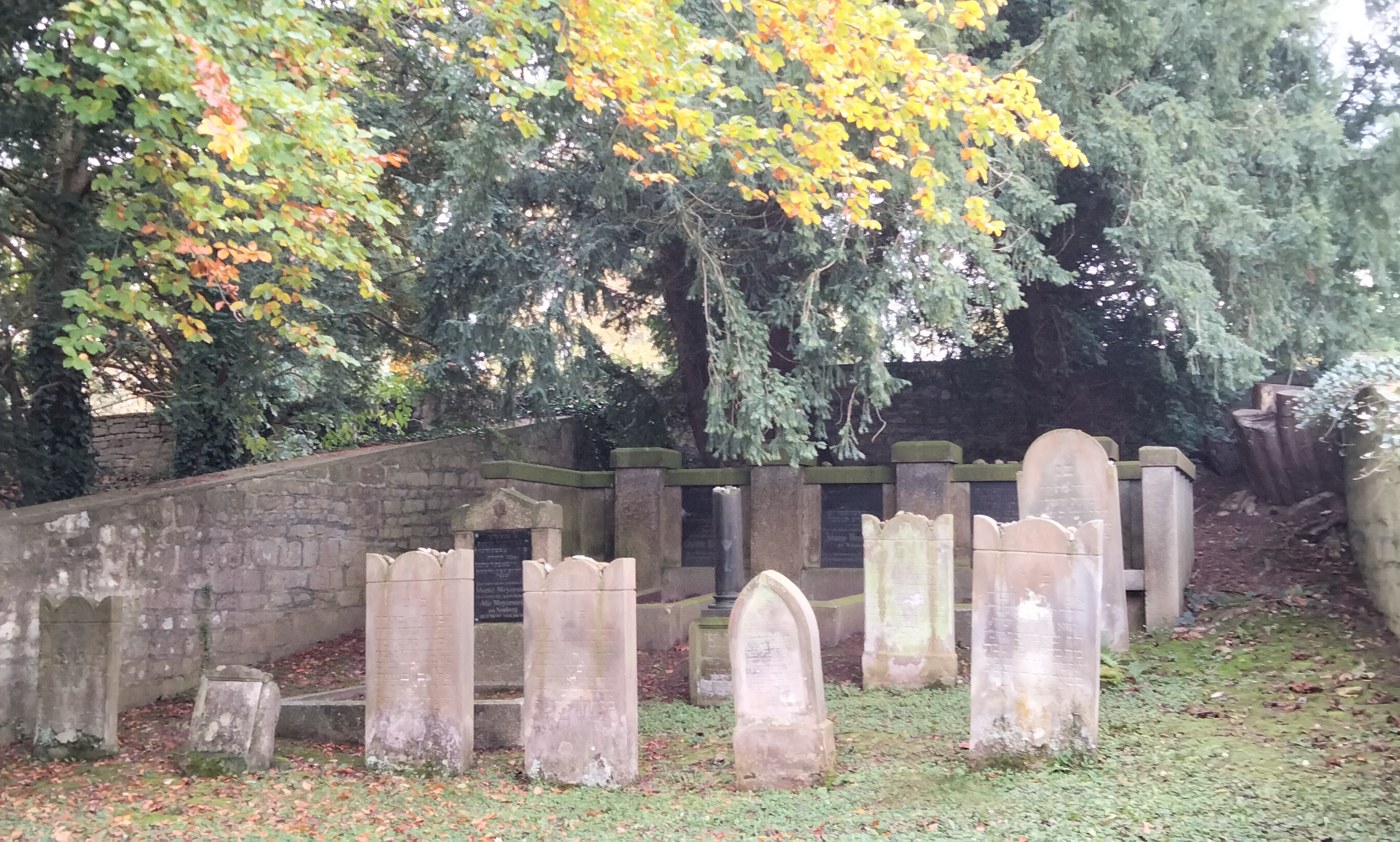
Jewish cemetery
