= Steven Kronauer =

American conductor and tenor

- Born: United States
- Genres: Classical
- Occupations: conductor, tenor
- Years active: 2000–present

Steven Kronauer is an American conductor and tenor known for directing the Young Men's Ensemble at the Los Angeles Children's Chorus, founding and directing Artes Vocales of Los Angeles, and his ten years with the Los Angeles Opera. Kronauer holds a doctorate from University of California, Los Angeles in choral and opera conducting and is also fluent in German.

== Early life ==
Kronauer is of German descent. He attended Interlochen Arts Academy, graduating in 1983. He then went on to complete two master's degrees, Vocal Performance and Choral Conducting, at the University of Michigan by 1990, and in 2006, Kronauer received his doctorate in choral and opera conducting from the University of California, Los Angeles.

== Career ==
Kronauer traveled to Cuba in June 2015 to conduct the Los Angeles Children's Chorus's Young Men's Ensemble on tour. He told the International Business Times, "I think music is something that bonds everyone, and the glory of the opportunity to share with music with other choirs from Cuba, and to share through the hearts and soul of music, and learning about the Cuban music for us, and perhaps (for them) learning about the American music we've brought as well, it's a wonderful opportunity to be together."
