= Rheden, Lower Saxony =

Rheden
- Ortsteil of Gronau
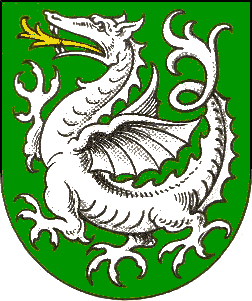
- Coat of arms
- Interactive map of Rheden
- Location within Germany Location within Lower Saxony
- Coordinates: 52°04′N 09°47′E
- Country: Germany
- State: Lower Saxony
- District: Hildesheim
- Town: Gronau

Area
  - Total: 15.14 km^{2} (5.85 sq mi)
- Elevation: 95 m (312 ft)

Population (2015-12-31)
  - Total: 1,015
  - Density: 67.04/km^{2} (173.6/sq mi)
- Time zone: UTC+01:00 (CET)
  - Summer (DST): UTC+02:00 (CEST)
- Postal codes: 31039
- Dialling codes: 05182
- Vehicle registration: HI

Rheden is a village and a former municipality in the district of Hildesheim in Lower Saxony, Germany. Since 1 November 2016, it is part of the town Gronau.
