= Betheln =

- Ortsteil of Gronau
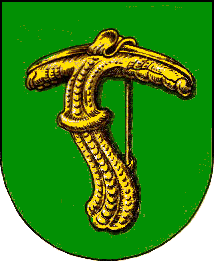
- Coat of arms
- Interactive map of Betheln
- Location within Germany Location within Lower Saxony
- Coordinates: 52°07′N 09°48′E
- Country: Germany
- State: Lower Saxony
- District: Hildesheim
- Town: Gronau

Area
  - Total: 7.51 km^{2} (2.90 sq mi)
- Elevation: 125 m (410 ft)

Population (2015-12-31)
  - Total: 972
  - Density: 129/km^{2} (335/sq mi)
- Time zone: UTC+01:00 (CET)
  - Summer (DST): UTC+02:00 (CEST)
- Postal codes: 31032
- Dialling codes: 05182
- Vehicle registration: HI

Betheln is a village and former municipality in the district of Hildesheim, in Lower Saxony, Germany. Since 1 November 2016, it is part of the town of Gronau.
