= Carmina Slovenica =

Slovenian female vocal theatre ensemble

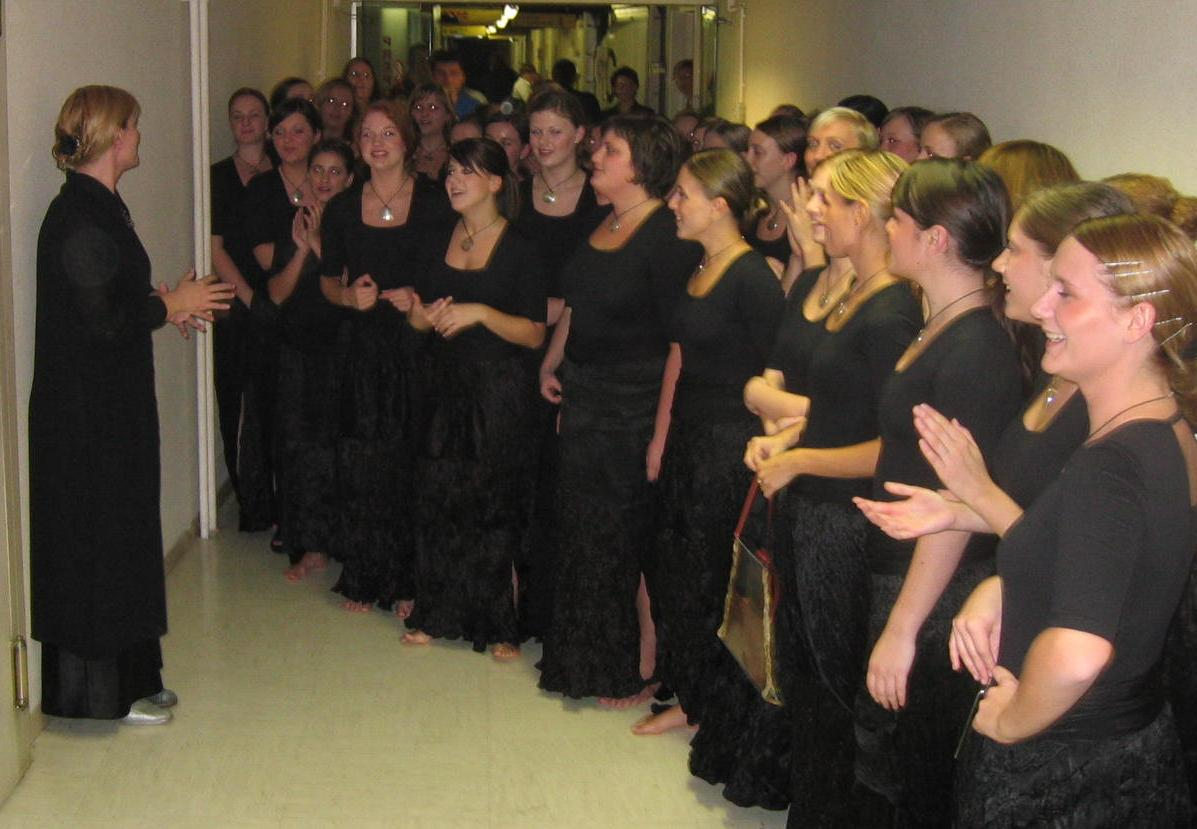
Carmina Slovenica

Carmina Slovenica is a Slovenian female vocal theatre ensemble, choir and production house, based in Maribor. It consists of three main ensembles, the Vocal Theatre Carmina Slovenica, the Carmina Slovenica Concert Choir, and the Ensemble ¡Kebataola!. Its concert and music theatre productions have toured internationally. The artistic director of Carmina Slovenica is conductor and director-author Karmina Šilec.

== History ==
The choir was established in 1964 by Branko Rajšter as the Central Choir of Maribor. It gave its first performance the following year and was later renamed The Youth Choir Maribor. Rajšter led the choir until 1989, when he was succeeded by Karmina Šilec, a decorated professor of choral conducting at the University of Maribor. The choir was renamed Carmina Slovenica in 1997, upon being registered formally as a cultural institute.

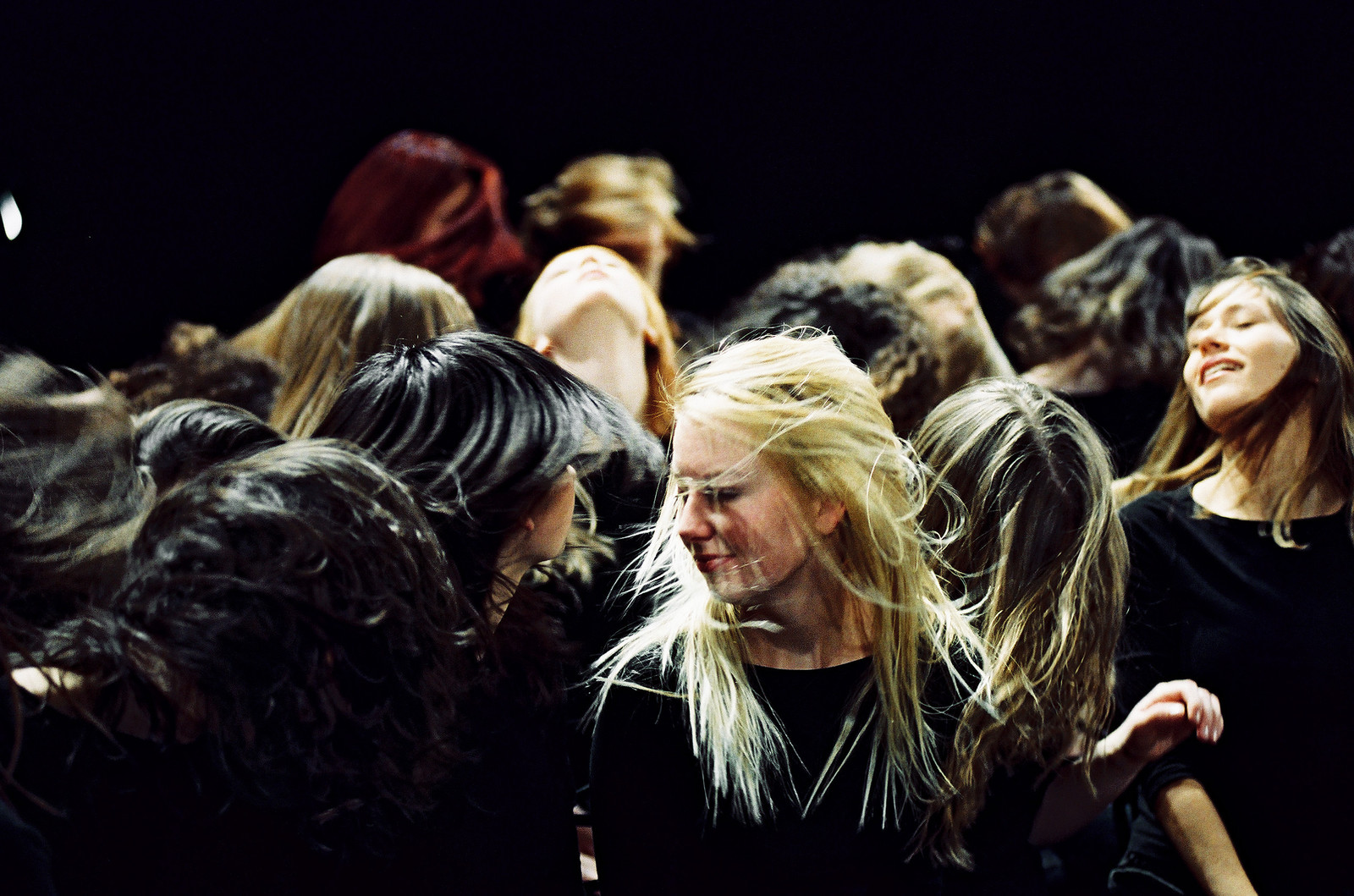
Carmina Slovenica in 2016

In 2001, Sounding Board, published by the American Composer's Forum, cited Carmina Slovenica as among the world's great children's choirs, including the Tapiola Choir in Finland, Adolf Frederik's group in Sweden, the San Francisco Girl's Chorus and the Nebraska Children's Choir.

In 2012, the vocal ensemble performed When the Mountain Changed Its Clothing. In January 2015, the vocal ensemble put on a production of Toxic Psalms at St. Ann's Warehouse in Brooklyn, New York. Zachary Woolfe of The New York Times wrote that it is "hardly what you'd expect from a choir concert", describing it as "vibrantly theatrical, genre-blurring, unusual in its techniques, eclectic in its musical style and politically charged". The performance was part of the Prototype Festival.

In 2018, Melita Forstnerič Hajnšek published a book in Slovenian about the ensemble, Planet Carmina.

In May 2020, the Carmina Slovenica premiered "Threnos" by Jacob Cooper and Karmina Šilec at the Operadagen Rotterdam.

== Description and performances ==
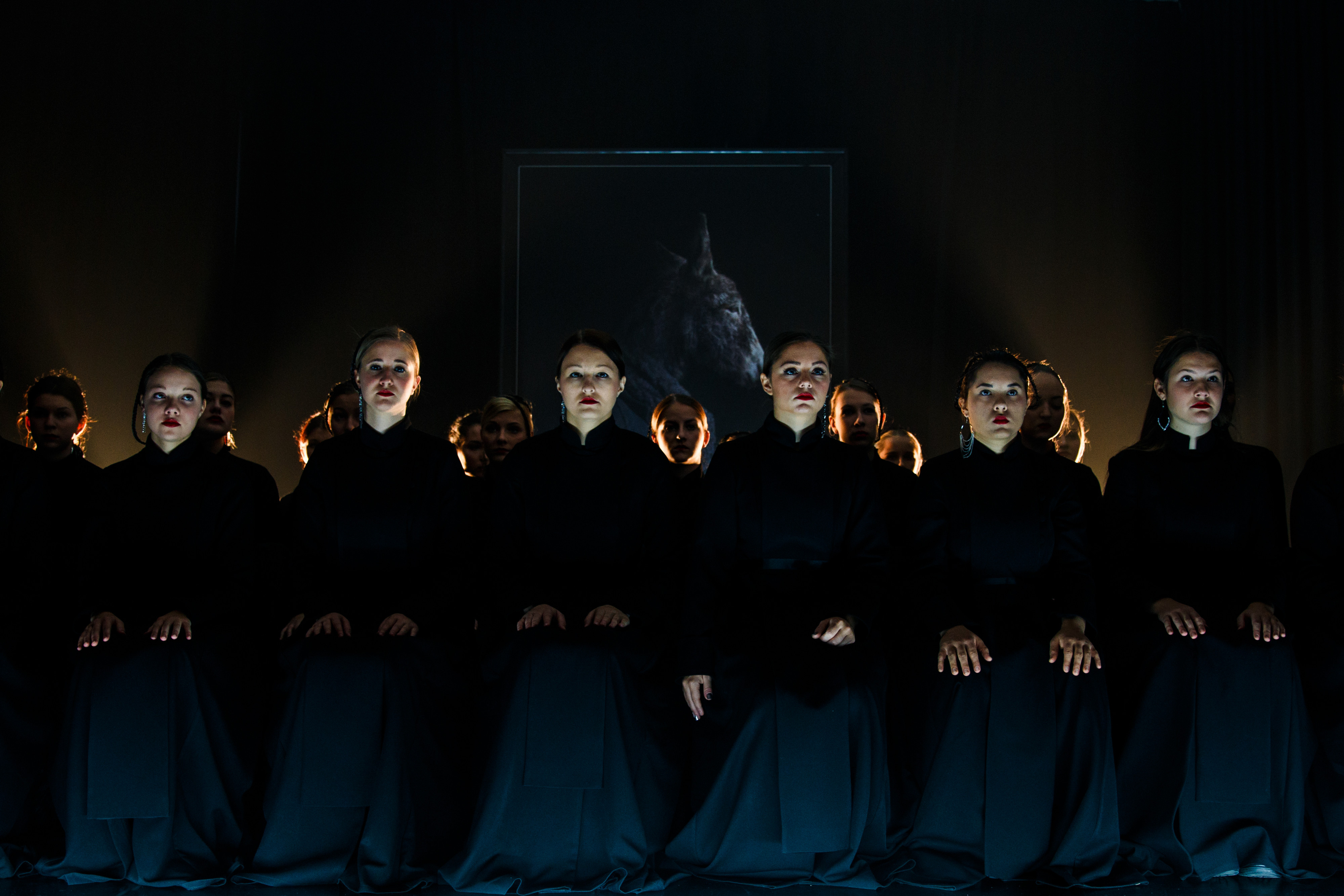
The dark, thematic dress of Carmina Slovenica

Carmina Slovenica is described (translated from Slovenian) as a "top ensemble that has marked the international scene as a collective that, with the concept of choregia, expands the fields of music-theatre art and brings freshness to the music scene, opening up new areas of expression, intensity of experience and communication." It is critically acclaimed, with over 30 international awards, and it has released 19 CDs. In the 2014 book Post-Yugoslavia:New Cultural and Political Perspectives, the authors write that the Carmina Slovenica female singers "back up their songs with their looks", often performing "dressed in nondescript uniforms that seem to be a combination of pioneer and partisan uniforms".

The Ensemble ¡Kebataola!. is known for using chants, songs, and arrangements of folk tunes and drawing upon inspiration from the 9th century. The Carmina Slovenica vocal theatre covers a wide range of music from early ritual chants to modern avant-garde. It has performed at the Tokyo Metropolitan Art Space, Grand St. Petersburg Philharmonic Hall, St. Ann's Warehouse NY, Esplanade Singapore, Teresa Carreño Theatre Caracas, Hong Kong Cultural Centre, Radial System Berlin, San Francisco Symphony Hall, Teatro Colón in Buenos Aires, Jahrhuderthalle Bochum, Théâtre de la Ville Paris, Auditorium Rome, the World Music Days, the Prototype Festival New York, and the Festival d'Automne á Paris, among many others.
