= Brüggen (Leine) =

- Ortsteil of Gronau
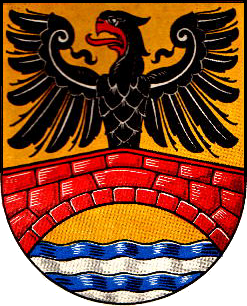
- Coat of arms
- Interactive map of Brüggen
- Location within Germany Location within Lower Saxony
- Coordinates: 52°02′34″N 09°46′53″E
- Country: Germany
- State: Lower Saxony
- District: Hildesheim
- Town: Gronau

Area
  - Total: 12.20 km^{2} (4.71 sq mi)
- Elevation: 94 m (308 ft)

Population (2016)
  - Total: 899
  - Density: 73.7/km^{2} (191/sq mi)
- Time zone: UTC+01:00 (CET)
  - Summer (DST): UTC+02:00 (CEST)
- Postal codes: 31033
- Dialling codes: 05182
- Vehicle registration: HI

Brüggen (German pronunciation: [ˈbʁʏɡn̩]) is a village and a former municipality in the district of Hildesheim in Lower Saxony, Germany. Since 1 November 2016 it has been part of the town of Gronau.
