= Fernando Malvar-Ruiz =

Fernando Malvar-Ruiz is a musician.

== Education ==
Fernando Malvar-Ruiz was born in Equatorial Guinea on July 11, 1968. He began his musical studies at the age of ten. After earning his undergraduate degree in piano performance and music theory from the Real Conservatorio Superior de Música in Madrid, he completed his Kodály certification in Kecskemét, Hungary, where he was awarded the Sarolta Kodály scholarship. He holds a master's degree in Choral Conducting from Ohio State University, and has completed all coursework toward a doctoral degree in musical arts from the University of Illinois.

== Career ==
Malvar-Ruiz has guest conducted internationally including the Kodály Music Education Institute of Australia, the World Children's Choir in Hong Kong, the Czech Republic, Bermuda, and the Des Moines International Children's Choral Festival. For 11 years, he instructed the summer master's Program in Kodály at Capital University and since 2008 has served on the faculty of the Internacional De Verano de Direccion Coral y Pedagogoia Musical in Las Palmas, Spain. Malvar-Ruiz also regularly conducts honor choirs and choral festivals throughout the United States for ACDA and OAKE regional and national conventions.

== The American Boychoir ==
Malvar-Ruiz is the Litton-Lodal Music Director of The American Boychoir, a music boarding school, located in Princeton, New Jersey, has performed for the 9/11 Memorial Service broadcast live on CNN around the world, "Look to Your Path" at the 2005 Academy Awards, the YouthAIDS Benefit Gala, and the US Open Tennis Tournament. He prepares the choir for regular performances with some of the finest orchestras in the world, including the New York Philharmonic, Boston Symphony Orchestra, Royal Concertgebouw, The Staatskapelle at Dresden in Germany, The Philadelphia Orchestra, and has worked with James Levine, Pierre Boulez, Kurt Masur, and Charles Dutoit.

== Recordings ==
With The American Boychoir -

- I Hear America Singing (2013) - Albemarle Records
- Journey On...Passport to a World of Music (2010) – Albemarle Records
- Harmony: American Songs of Faith (2007) – Albemarle Records
- Voices of Angels (2004) – Albemarle Records
- Litton Live (2002) - Albemarle Records, Music Director : James Litton

As conductor

- Biebl: Ave Maria
- Prayer of the Children
- Weep No More
