= Despetal =

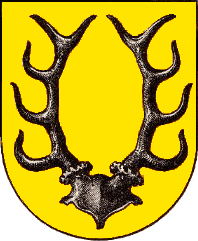
- Coat of arms
- Interactive map of Despetal
- Location within Germany Location within Lower Saxony
- Coordinates: 52°06′N 09°49′E
- Country: Germany
- State: Lower Saxony
- District: Hildesheim
- Disbanded: 1 November 2016

Area
  - Total: 15.03 km^{2} (5.80 sq mi)
- Elevation: 130 m (430 ft)

Population (2015-12-31)
  - Total: 1,237
  - Density: 82.30/km^{2} (213.2/sq mi)
- Time zone: UTC+01:00 (CET)
  - Summer (DST): UTC+02:00 (CEST)
- Postal codes: 31035
- Dialling codes: 05182
- Vehicle registration: HI

Despetal is a former municipality in the district of Hildesheim in Lower Saxony, Germany. Since 1 November 2016, it is part of the town Gronau.
