= Eime, Lower Saxony =

- Municipality
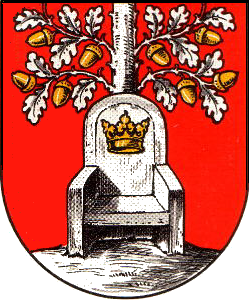
- Coat of arms

- Location of Eime, Lower Saxony within Hildesheim district
- Interactive map of Eime, Lower Saxony
- Location within Germany Location within Lower Saxony
- Coordinates: 52°05′N 09°43′E
- Country: Germany
- State: Lower Saxony
- District: Hildesheim
- Municipal assoc.: Leinebergland

Government
  - Mayor: Hartmut Fischer (SPD)

Area
  - Total: 21.97 km^{2} (8.48 sq mi)
- Elevation: 89 m (292 ft)

Population (2025-12-31)
  - Total: 2,558
  - Density: 116.4/km^{2} (301.6/sq mi)
- Time zone: UTC+01:00 (CET)
  - Summer (DST): UTC+02:00 (CEST)
- Postal codes: 31036
- Dialling codes: 05182
- Vehicle registration: HI

Eime (German pronunciation: [ˈaɪmə]) is a municipality in the district of Hildesheim in Lower Saxony, Germany.
