= Gronau, Lower Saxony =

Gronau
- Town
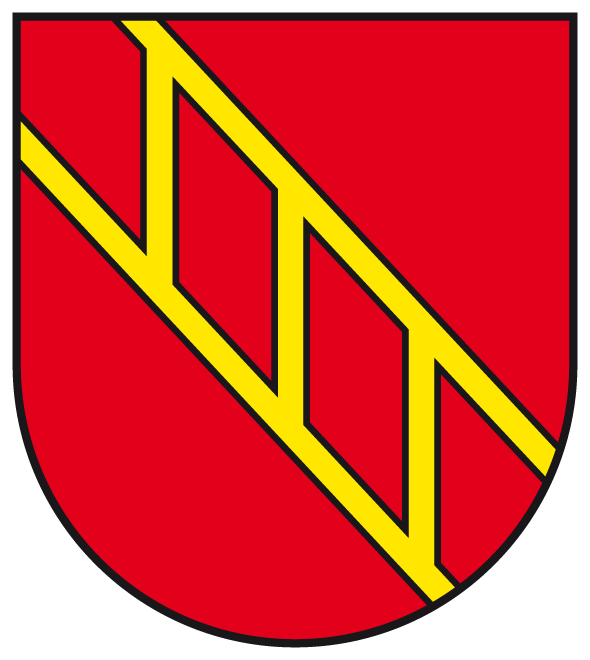
- Coat of arms

- Location of Gronau within Hildesheim district
- Interactive map of Gronau
- Location within Germany Location within Lower Saxony
- Coordinates: 52°04′N 9°47′E
- Country: Germany
- State: Lower Saxony
- District: Hildesheim
- Municipal assoc.: Leinebergland

Government
  - Mayor: Karl Heinz Gieseler SPD

Area
  - Total: 88.39 km^{2} (34.13 sq mi)
- Elevation: 79 m (259 ft)

Population (2025-12-31)
  - Total: 10,459
  - Density: 118.3/km^{2} (306.5/sq mi)
- Time zone: UTC+01:00 (CET)
  - Summer (DST): UTC+02:00 (CEST)
- Postal codes: 31028
- Vehicle registration: HI
- Website: www.gronau-leine.de

Gronau (German pronunciation: [ˈɡʁoːnaʊ]) is a town and a municipality in the district of Hildesheim, in Lower Saxony, Germany. It is situated on the River Leine, approximately 15 km southwest of Hildesheim, and 35 km south of Hanover. Since 1 November 2016, the former municipalities Banteln, Betheln, Brüggen, Despetal and Rheden are part of the municipality Gronau.

Gronau is also the seat of the Samtgemeinde ("collective municipality") of Leinebergland.

== History ==
Gronau was founded around 1298 by Siegfried II of Querfurt, the bishop of Hildesheim. The town was laid out according to a plan of regular streets with a wall, shot towers, remparts and two gates. Gronau was a part of the Prince-Bishopric of Hildesheim. In 1467 Gronau became a member of the Hanseatic League. It was destroyed during the Hildesheim Diocesan Feud and the Thirty Years' War. Many houses were destroyed by fire in 1577, 1703, 1758 and 1795. The medieval town wall was demolished at the end of the 18th century, and the inhabitants who had lost their homes during the fire of 1795 were allowed to use the stones for building new houses.

Gronau had 1.681 inhabitants in 1821 and 2.537 in 1900. After the railway line from Elze to Bad Salzdetfurth had been inaugurated in 1901 and Gronau had got a railway station the town developed into an industrial town with several factories. In 1921 Gronau had 2.663 inhabitants. The villages of Banteln, Betheln, Brüggen, Despetal y Rheden were incorporated into the town in 2016 and the number of inhabitanats rose to more than 10.000.

== Sights ==
Many well-preserved half-timbered houses can be visited in the historical town center. Various parts of the medieval wall are preserved as well. The two gates, however, are not preserved, but two streets (Steintor and Leintor) are named after them. St. Mattäus Church was founded in 1457 and renovated by the famous architect Georg Ludwig Friedrich Laves from 1856 to 1859. The church is famous for its medieval winged altarpiece dating from 1415. The pulpit and the baptismal font were created in 1859 and the organ dates from 1869. The clock tower measures 55 metres in height. The ruin of Saint George Chapel, a small gothic chapel with typical pointed arches representing the style of the Middle Ages, can be visited in the north of Gronau outside of the historical town centre. Originally it was a part of a hospital which was demolished in 1960.

The Town Hall dating from 1907 in the Market Place represents the style of Gründerzeit.

The monastery of Dominican Order was founded in 1680. Its aisleless church dates from 1715. Near the monastery a part of the medieval town wall with a fortified tower built in the 14th century can be visited. The tower measuring ten metres in height got the nickname Leaning Tower of Gronau. Unlike the other fortified towers in Gronau it was not demolished at the end of the 18th century, as it was used as a prison for a long time.

The Jewish cemetery founded in 1819 can be visited in Hoher Escher Street. 57 graves are preserved. The cemetery was used until 1934, devastated in 1938 and renovated in 1978. The former synagoge of Gronau, built around 1820, is still preserved in Südstraße Strasse no. 14. As it is in a narrow lane surrounded by wooden half-timbered houses it was not set on fire in 1938 in the Kristallnacht but transformed into a residential building. Unfortunately there is no conmemorative plaque fixed on the building.

== Infrastructure ==
Gronau has a hospital and various schools. The railway line was closed in 1981 and dismantled afterwards. The railway bridge above river Leine was transformed into a walking path for hikers. The nearest railway station is in Banteln, a village which was incorporated into Gronau in 2016. Gronau can be reached by bus from Hildesheim, Elze and from the surrounding villages.

Honiton, United Kingdom, is twinned with Gronau.

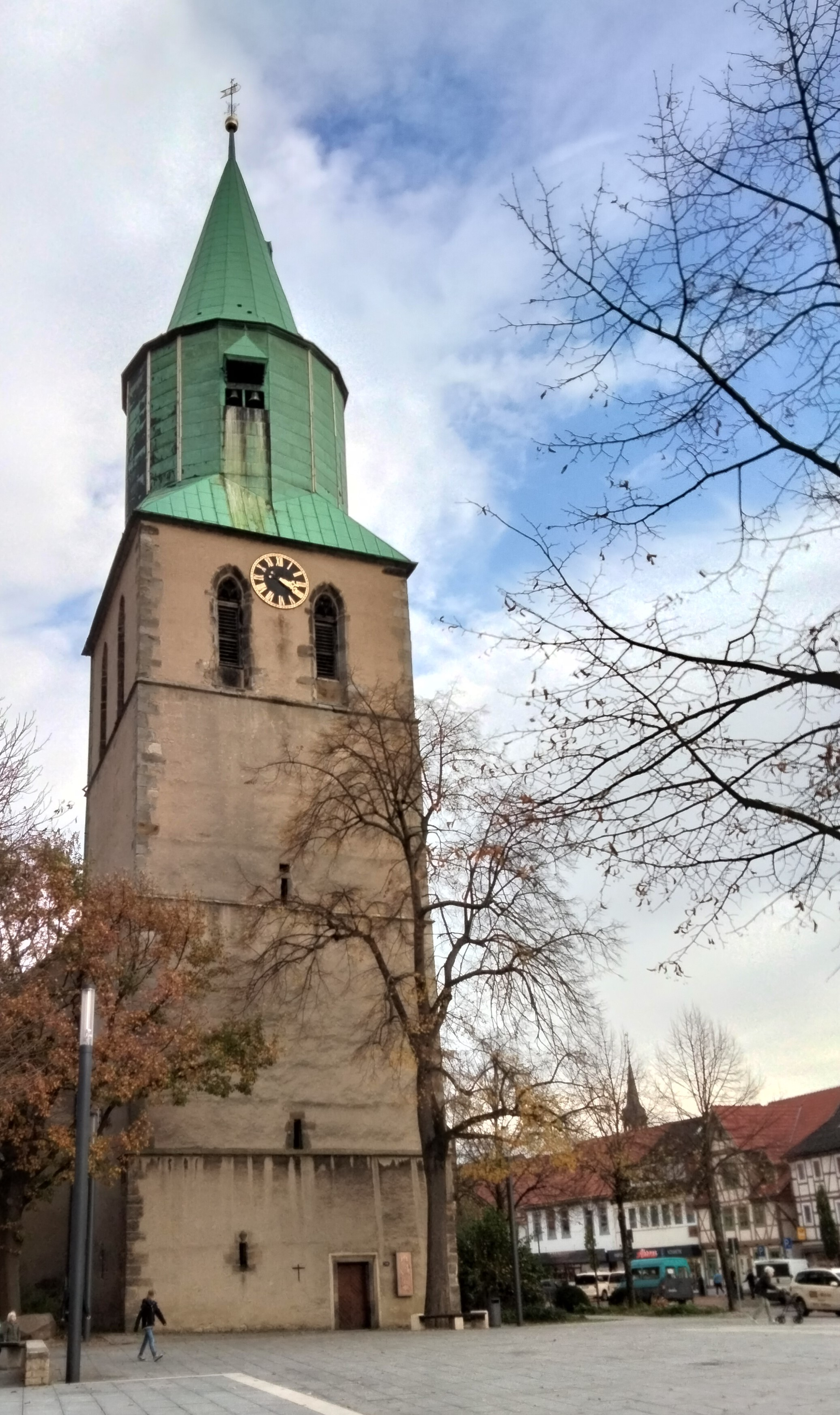
Clock tower of St. Mattäus Church

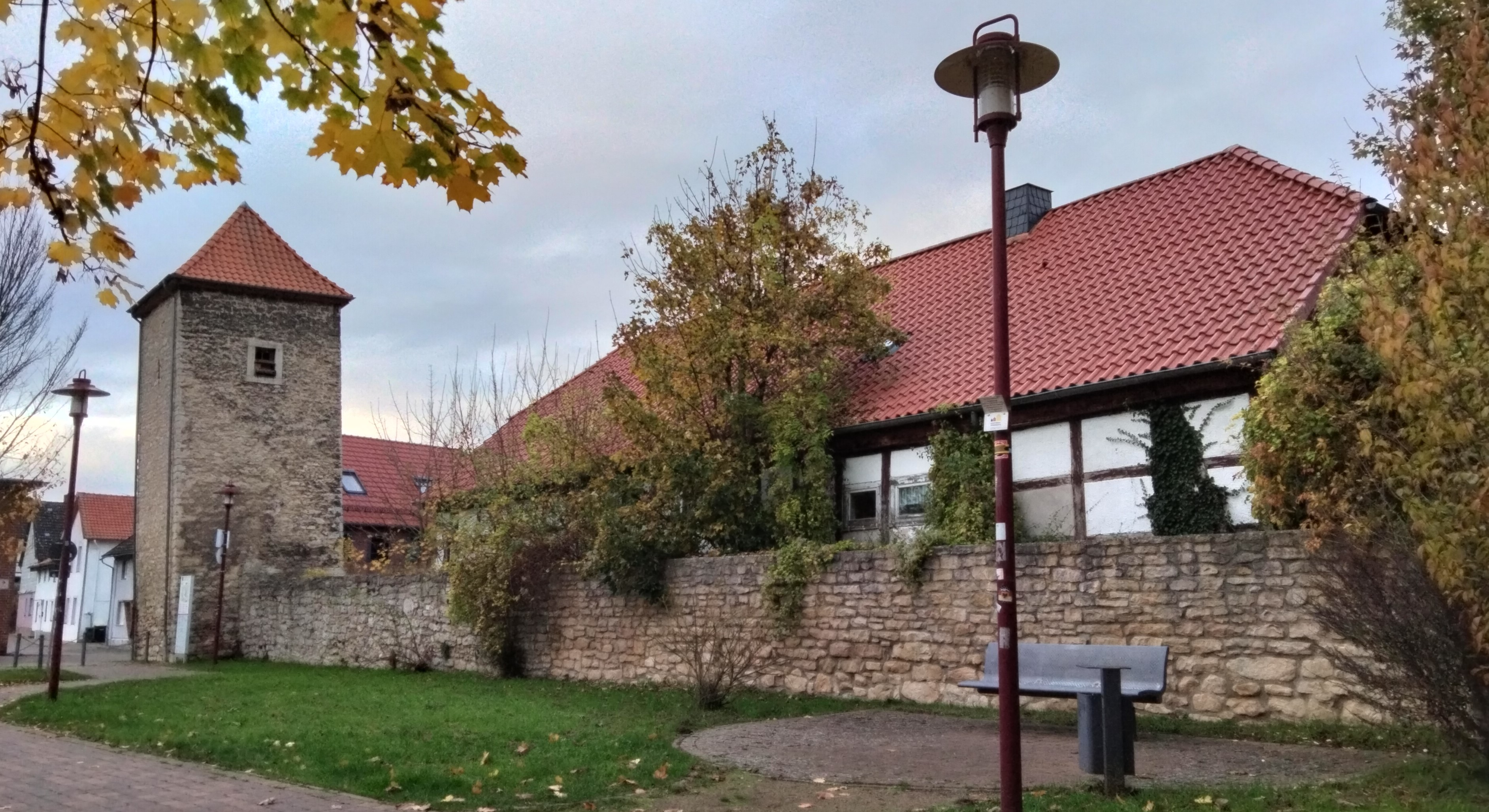
Medieval town wall and Leaning Tower

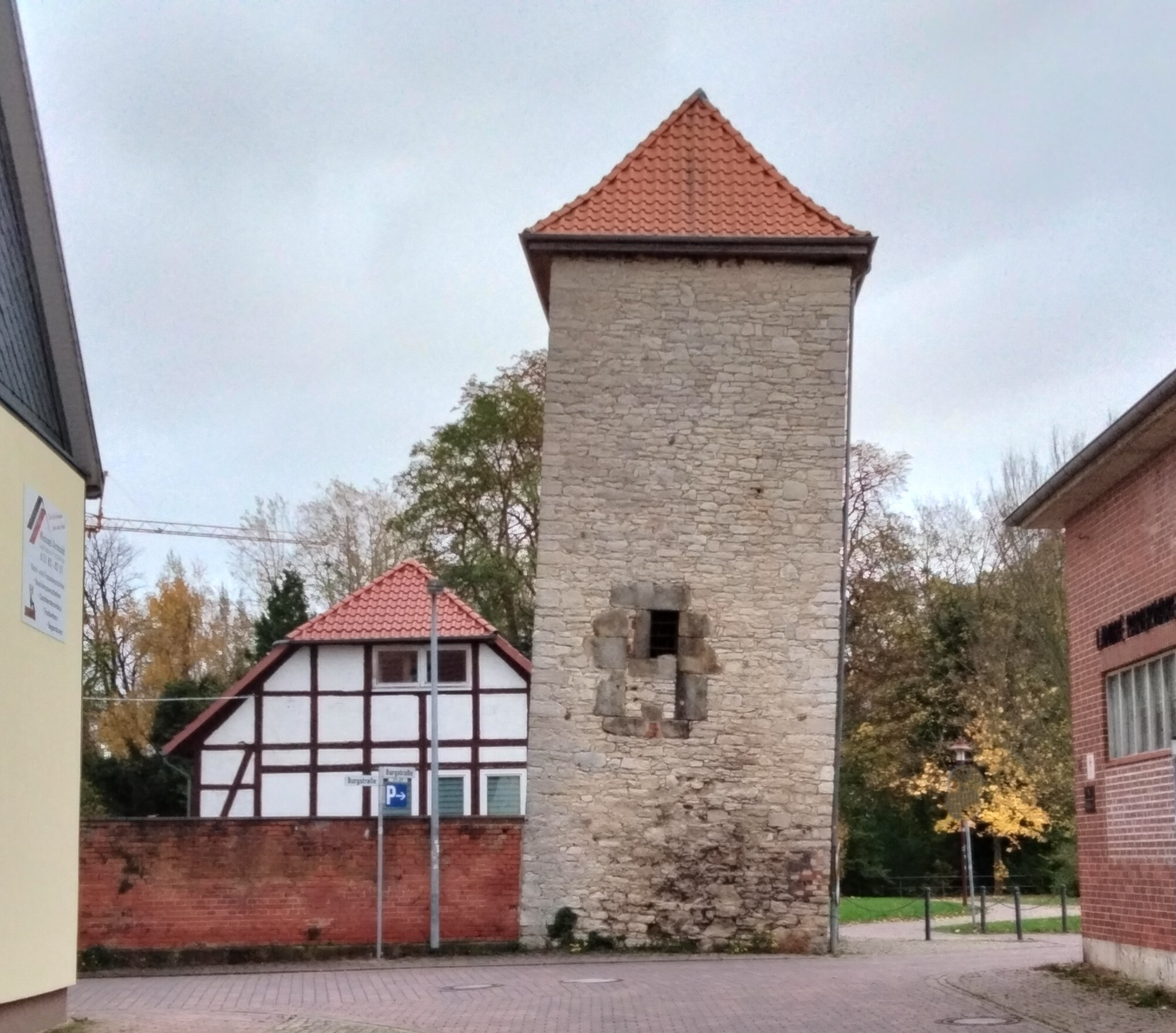
Leaning Tower

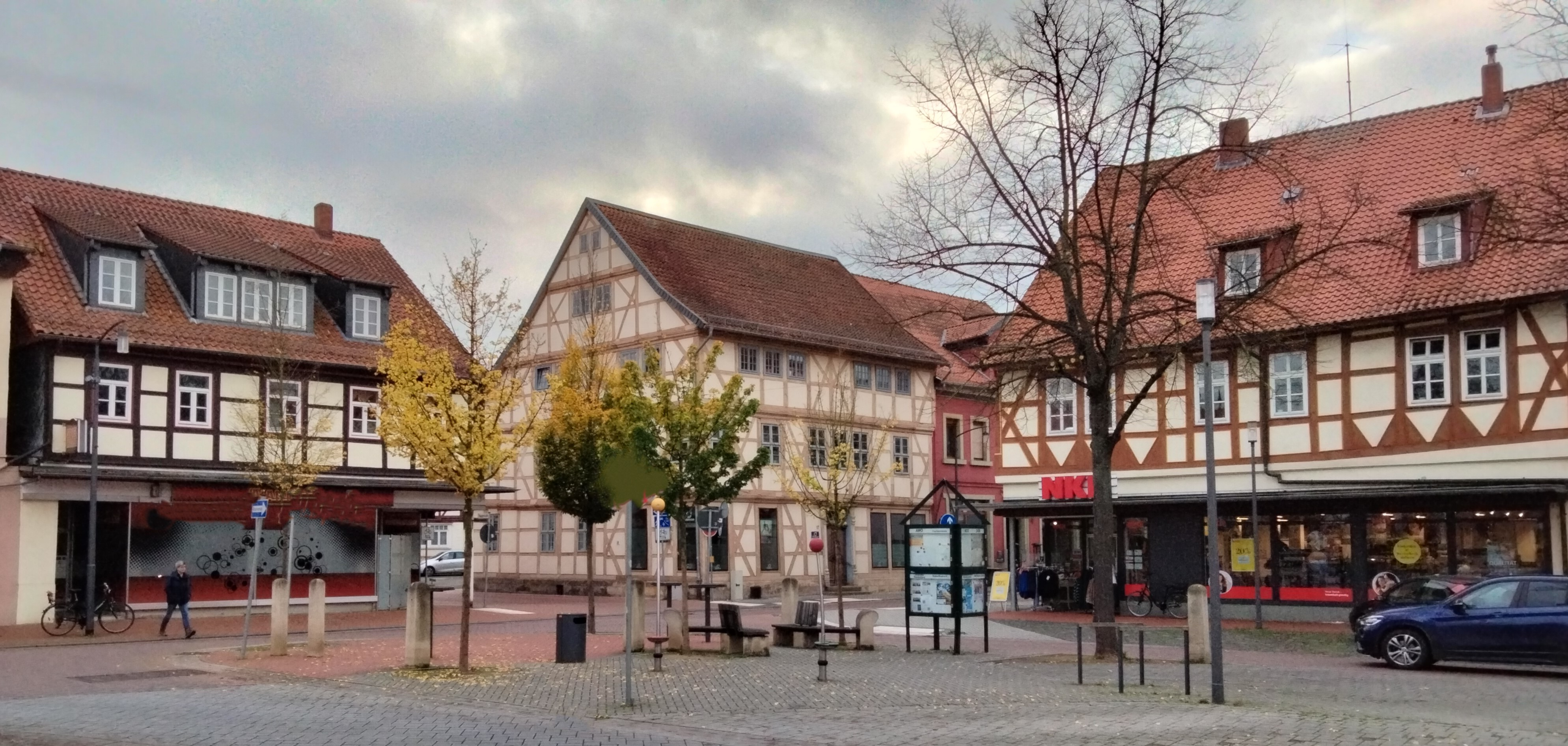
Market Place

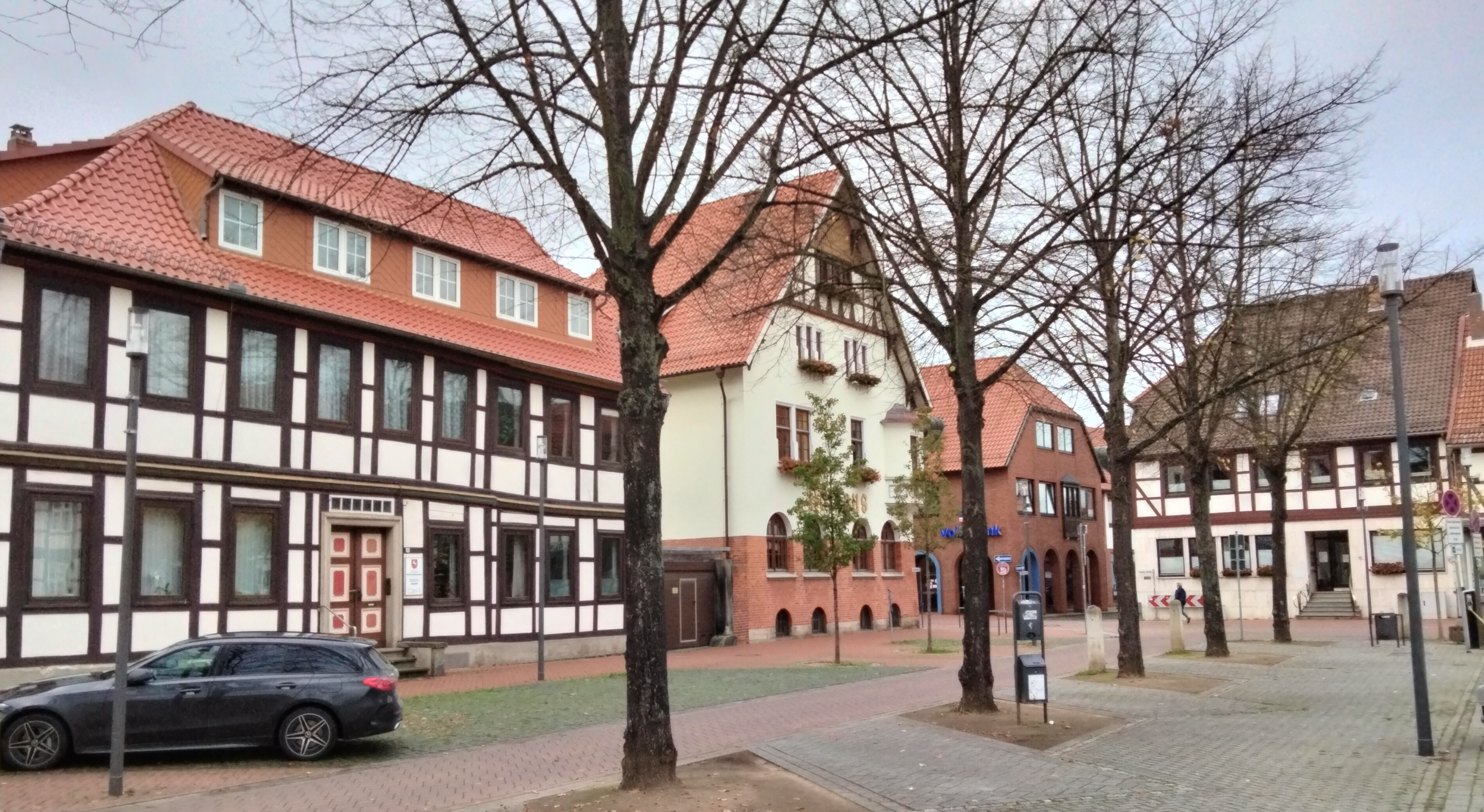
Town Hall in the Market Place

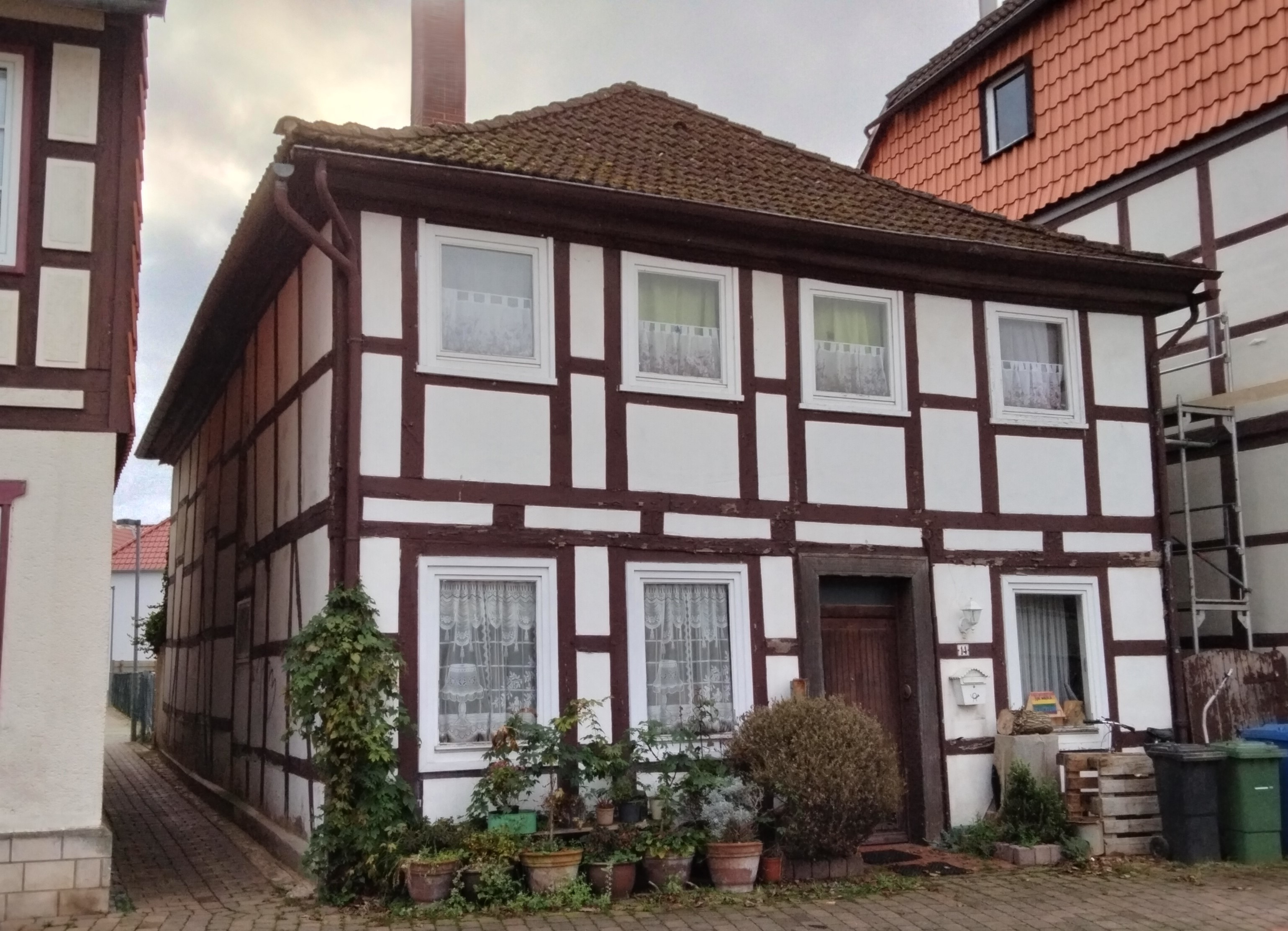
Former Synagogue

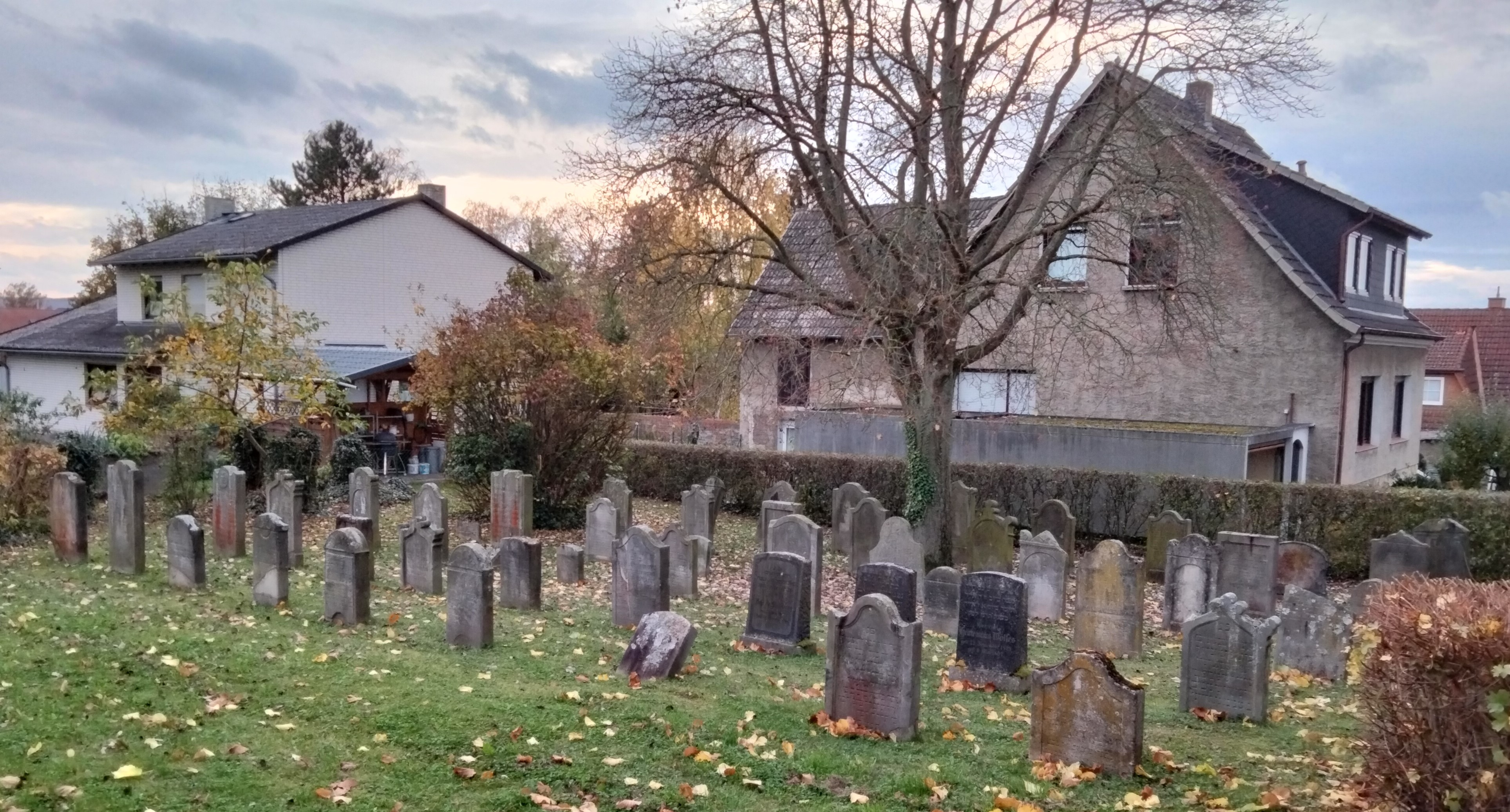
Jewish cemetery

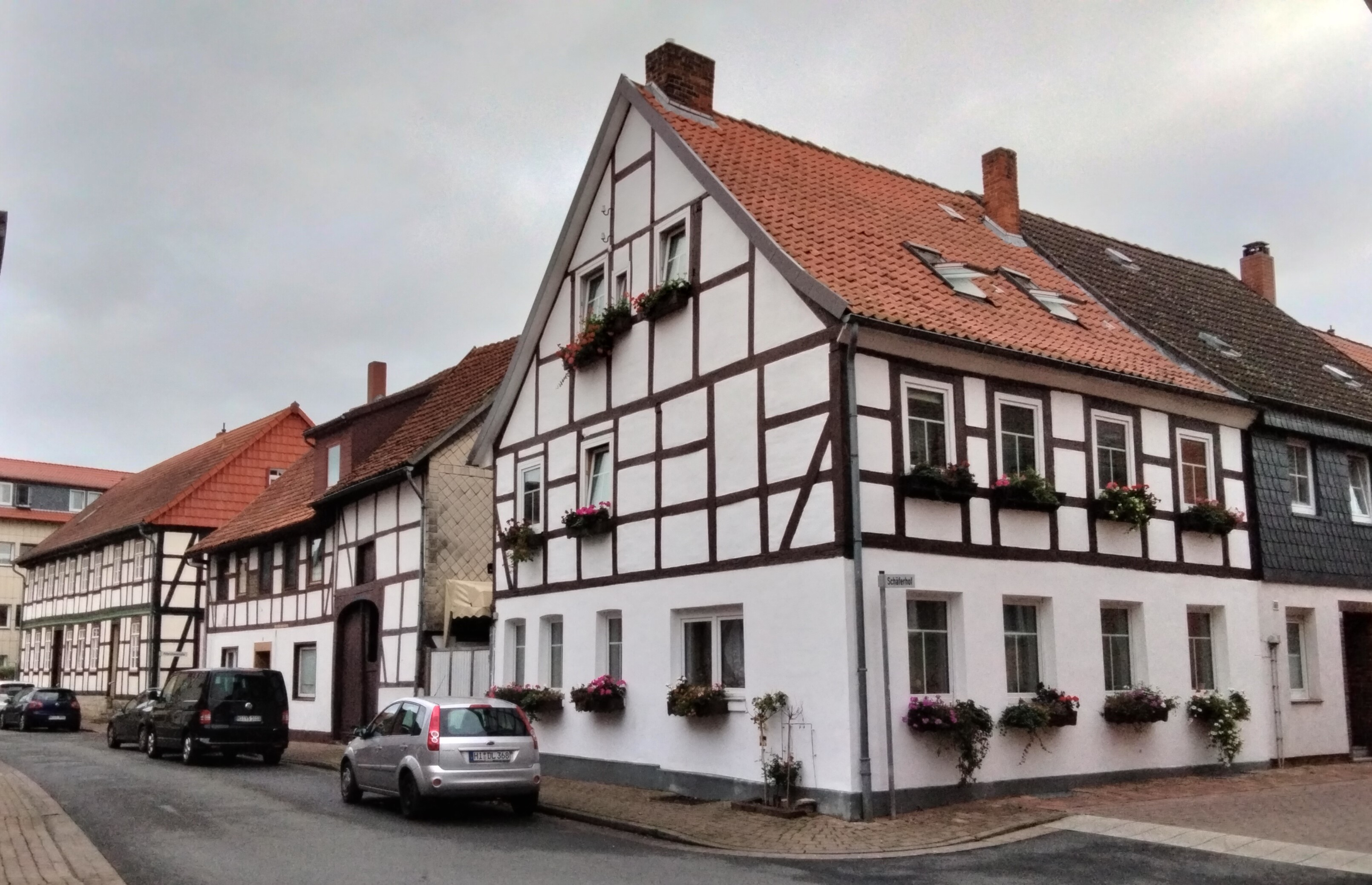
Half-timbered houses in Schäferhof Street

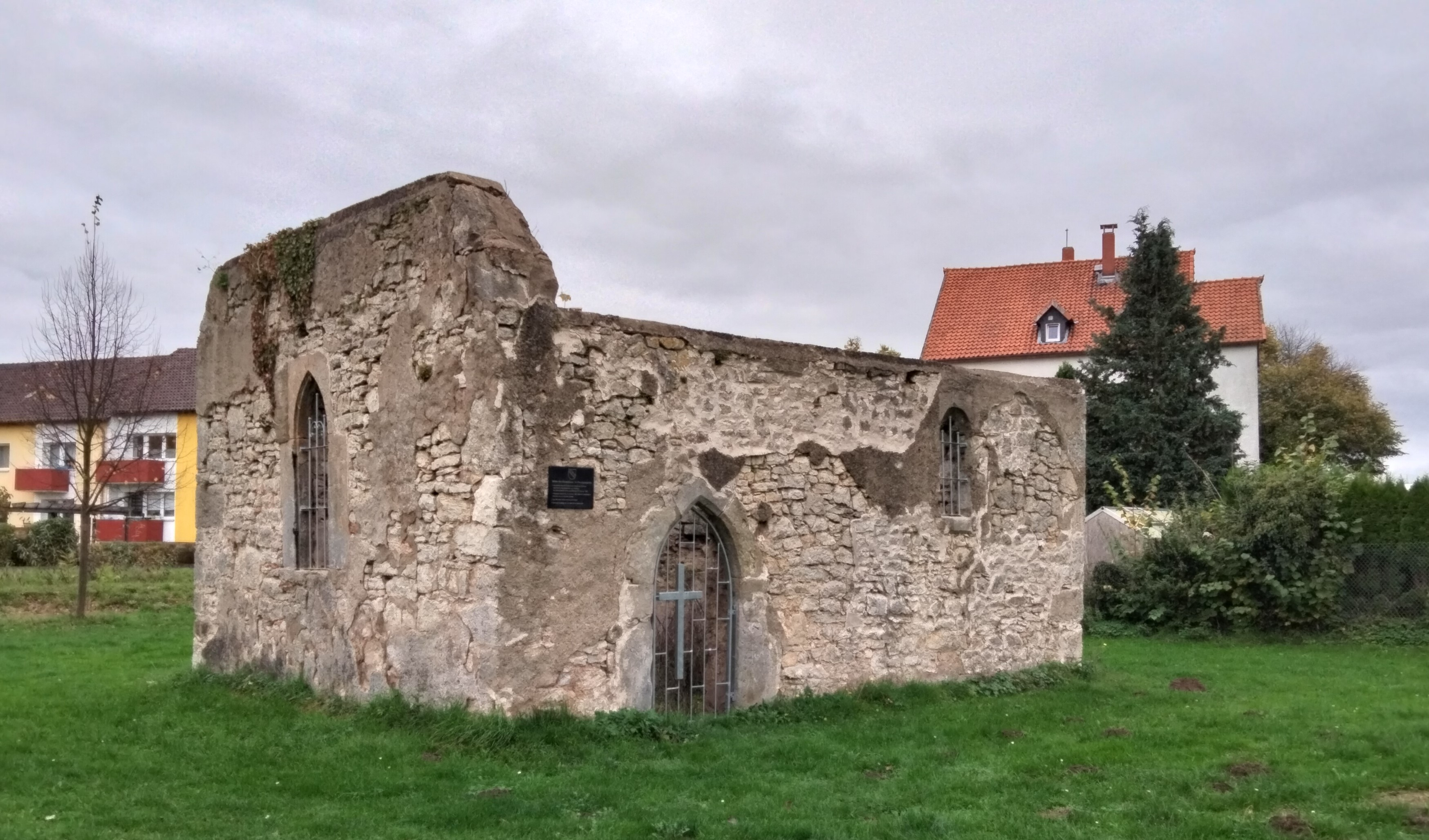
St. George's Chapel

== Personalities ==
- Armin Kaufmann (1922-1985), born in Banteln, lawyer and university lecturer
- Jürgen Mlynek (born 1951), physicist
