= Peanuts on Parade =

Public art exhibition in Sonoma County, California

- Description Statue of Charlie Brown in the parking lot of the Charles Schulz Museum in Santa Rosa, California

Peanuts on Parade is a public art exhibition featuring around 145 life-sized statues of characters from Peanuts comic strip in Sonoma County, California, where Peanuts creator Charles M. Schulz lived from 1969 until his death in 2000. The exhibition is fluid, with new statues being added on a regular basis.

== History ==
The exhibition began in 2005, modeled after a similar exhibition in Schulz's birthplace of Minneapolis. The first statue on display was one of Charlie Brown.

In 2010, 30 statues of Lucy Van Pelt were added to the display.

== Current display & locations ==
As of September 2026, there are 49 pieces depicting Snoopy, 34 pieces depicting Charlie Brown, 33 pieces depicting Woodstock, and 25 pieces depicting Lucy. There are also statues featuring Linus, Sally, and Schroeder.

The majority of pieces, 132 in total, are on display in Santa Rosa, the city in which Schulz lived. On top of that, there are 9 in Rohnert Park, 4 in Windsor, 1 in Petaluma, 1 in Cotati, 1 in Healdsburg, and 1 in Bodega Bay. Of these, 7 statues are displayed in private residences.

The exhibition also officially includes a bush cut in the shape of Snoopy outside Snoopy's Home Ice, the skating rink that Schulz established; a 1996 drawing in cement by Schulz outside the Canine Companions Headquarters and Northwest Training Center; and a replica of Schulz's star on the Hollywood Walk of Fame outside Snoopy's Gallery & Gift Shop.

== See also ==
- "The Complete History of Peanuts on Parade - Vol. 2: The Santa Rosa Years" by Jean Schulz (daughter of Charles Schulz)
- Images of Woodstock statues that have been a part of Peanuts on Parade, including some that are no longer on display
