= Snoopy's Home Ice =

Ice rick in Santa Rosa, California

Coordinates: 38.4609°N 122.7344°W

Redwood Empire Ice Arena

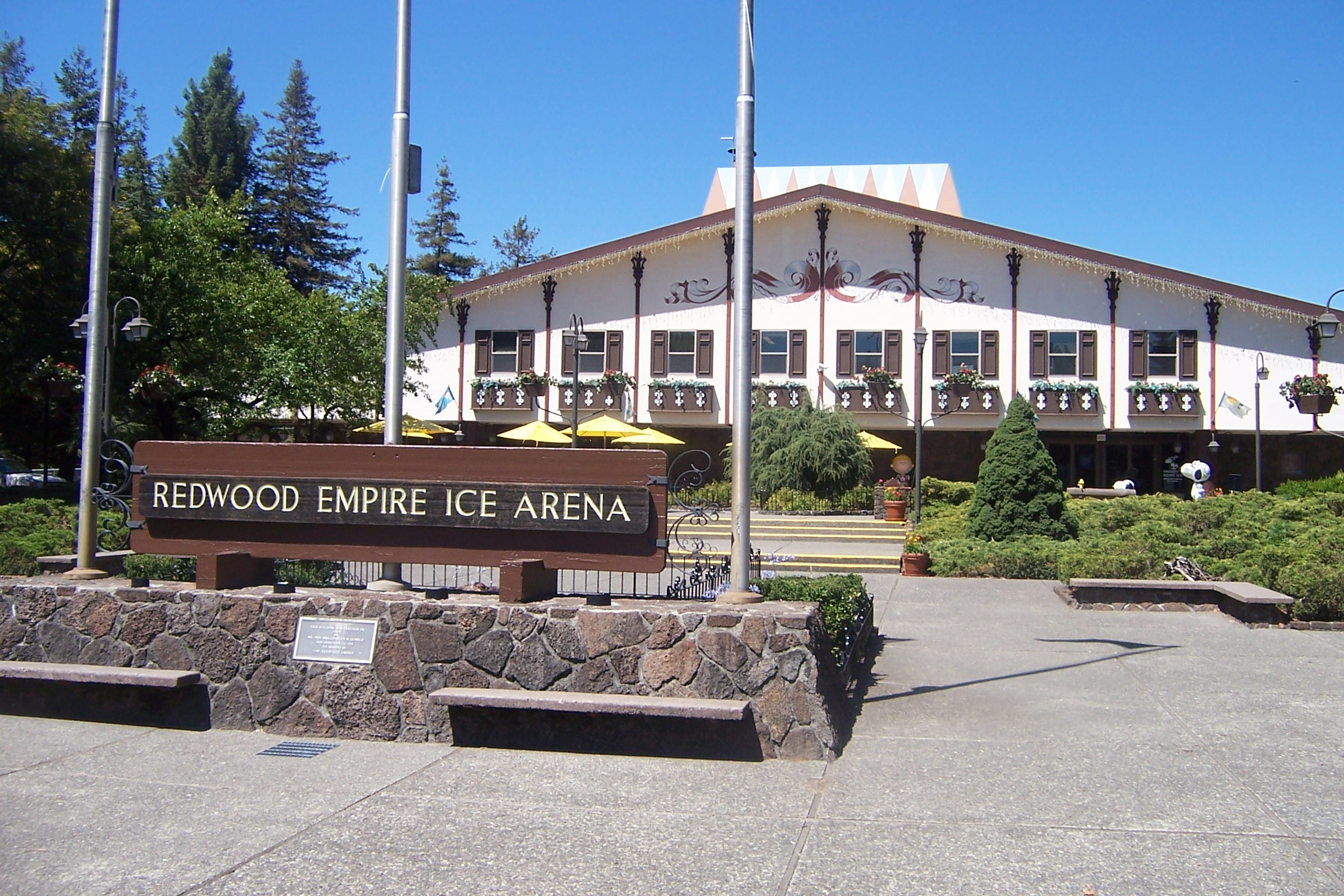
- Redwood Empire Ice Arena, 2007.
- Interactive map of Redwood Empire Ice Arena
- Location: Santa Rosa, California
- Owner: Charles M. Schulz
- Capacity: 3,000
- Surface: Ice
- Public transit: CityBus 6 & 10

Construction
- Opened: April 28, 1969; 57 years ago

Tenants
- Santa Rosa Flyers; Cardinal Newman High School Hockey; Santa Rosa Junior College Hockey; Santa Rosa Figure Skating Club; Santa Rosa Growlers

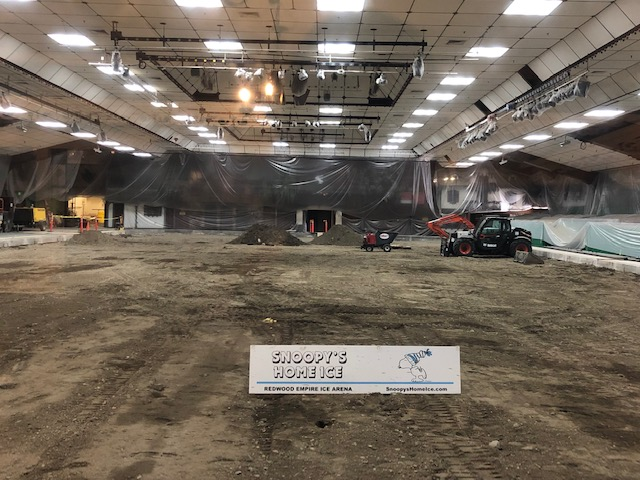
Renovations at Snoopy's Home Ice, 2019

The Redwood Empire Ice Arena (commonly known as Snoopy's Home Ice) is an indoor ice rink in Santa Rosa, California, United States. It was owned and built by Peanuts cartoonist Charles M. Schulz, and it opened on April 28, 1969. It was originally conceived, designed, and operated by his first wife Joyce Schulz.

The Arena offers public skating, private ice time, figure skating, junior hockey, and adult hockey. It is also host to the annual Snoopy's Senior World Hockey Tournament, in which 64-70 senior teams from all over the world come to Santa Rosa for a week-long hockey tournament in the summer. The arena has about 500 permanent seats for hockey games, but this can be expanded to 3,000 seats for concerts and other events. The arena is also home to the junior hockey Santa Rosa Flyers, the Cardinal Newman High School hockey team, and the Santa Rosa Figure Skating Club.

The Arena, located just down the street from the Charles M. Schulz Museum and Research Center, features The Warm Puppy Café, which serves cafe drinks and meals.

Across the parking lot from the Arena is Snoopy's Gallery and Gift Shop where people can buy Peanuts-related products as well as figure skating and hockey equipment.

In the summer of 2019, the ice rink was closed and underwent renovations for the first time since the arena opened a half-century earlier. The rink re-opened in November.

The ice arena is also the home of the Santa Rosa Growlers, a new Senior A team in the Mountain West Hockey League.

== Public transportation ==
Santa Rosa CityBus lines 6 and 10 serve the arena. Santa Rosa North station of the Sonoma-Marin Area Rail Transit system is located half a mile southwest of the arena.
