= Li'l Folks =

Comic strip

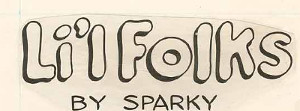
- Official logo
- Author: Charles M. Schulz
- Current status/schedule: concluded / weekly
- Launch date: June 22, 1947
- End date: January 22, 1950
- Syndicate(s): Minneapolis Tribune, St. Paul Pioneer Press
- Genre(s): Humor, Children, Teens, Adults
- Followed by: Peanuts

Li'l Folks was a weekly cartoon feature by American cartoonist Charles M. Schulz and a precursor to his comic strip Peanuts. Two early installments appeared in the Minneapolis Tribune in June 1947 under the title Sparky's Li'l Folks, before the feature began its regular run in the St. Paul Pioneer Press on June 22, 1947. The final installment appeared on January 22, 1950. Schulz's first regular newspaper feature, Li'l Folks consisted of single-panel cartoons rather than a continuing comic strip. Its humor often came from children speaking like adults. It anticipated elements of Peanuts, including the name Charlie Brown and a puppy resembling the early Snoopy. Unlike Peanuts, Li'l Folks did not feature any recurring characters, though several themes were carried over to the later strip, including: Beethoven's music (which was applied to Peanuts character Schroeder); dogs resembling Snoopy that appeared in most strips; and the name Charlie Brown.

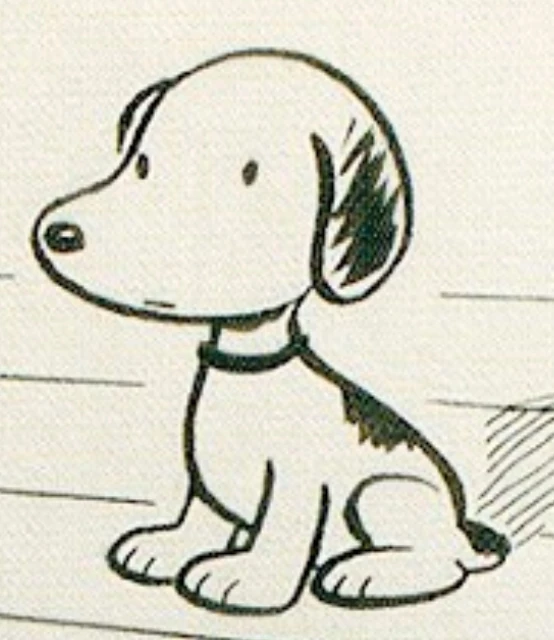
"Rover", the earliest prototypical version of Snoopy, from Li'l Folks from a strip from an unknown date.

== Publication history ==
Schulz was 24 at the time he began drawing Li'l Folks, and he was living with his father in a four-bedroom apartment above his father's barber shop. He earned $10 for each submission to the paper.

The first two installments of Li'l Folks ran June 8 and 15, 1947, in the Minneapolis Tribune. It then moved to the St. Paul Pioneer Press; Li'l Folks ran in the women's section of the paper.

In 1948, Schulz tried to have Li'l Folks syndicated through the Newspaper Enterprise Association (a Scripps Company). He would have been an independent contractor for the syndicate, unheard of in the 1940s, but the deal fell through.

Schulz quit two years into the strip after the editor turned down his requests for a pay increase and a move of Li'l Folks from the women's section to the comics pages.

Later that year, Schulz approached United Feature Syndicate (also a Scripps Company) with Li'l Folks, and the syndicate became interested. By this point, Schulz had redeveloped Li'l Folks with a four-panel strip format and a set cast of characters, rather than different nameless children for each page. The syndicate accepted the strip; however, the name Li'l Folks was too close to the names of two other comics of the time: Al Capp's Li'l Abner and a strip titled Little Folks. To avoid confusion, the syndicate chose the name Peanuts, after the peanut gallery featured in the Howdy Doody TV show. Peanuts made its first appearance on October 2, 1950, in seven newspapers.

All of the original Li'l Folks comic strips have fallen into the public domain due to a lack of a copyright notice and weren't renewed.

== Characters and story ==
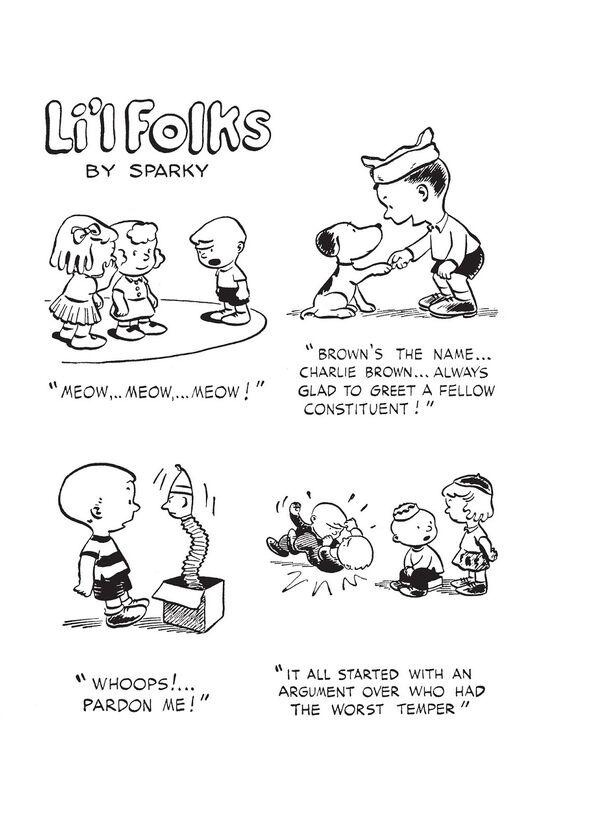
First appearance of a "Charlie Brown" from a May 30, 1948 strip of Li'l Folks.

The name Charlie Brown first appeared in Li'l Folks on May 30, 1948. Schulz used it for four different characters, who bore little resemblance to the later Peanuts protagonist; the name came from his fellow instructor Charles F. Brown at Art Instruction Schools. One strip also featured a dog named Rover that looked much like Snoopy. Like most of Peanuts, adult characters were not shown in the strip.

== Collected editions ==
The newspaper never returned Schulz's original artwork, so he clipped each week's strip from the paper and placed it in his scrapbook, which eventually housed over 7,000 pieces of artwork.

In 2004, the Charles M. Schulz Museum and Research Center (Santa Rosa, California) published Charles M. Schulz: Li'l Beginnings, edited by Derrick Bang with a foreword by Jean Schulz. The book collects all 135 installments published in the St. Paul Pioneer Press between June 22, 1947, and January 22, 1950, with annotations and commentary by Bang. It is available from the Museum and distributed by Fantagraphics Books. The complete run of the strip was also included in the penultimate volume of The Complete Peanuts, published in May 2016 by Fantagraphics Books.
