= Snoopy's Senior World Hockey Tournament =

Amateur senior hockey tournament in California

Snoopy Tournament logo

Snoopy's Senior World Hockey Tournament (commonly known as the "Snoopy Tournament") is a major amateur senior ice hockey tournament held every summer at Redwood Empire Ice Arena in Santa Rosa, California. Charles M. Schulz, creator of the comic strip Peanuts and owner of the arena, started the tournament in 1975.

== Tournament structure ==
The entire tournament consists of over 60 teams split up into many different divisions. The teams are divided up by age group: 40, 45, 50, 55, 60, 65, 70, and 75. A player is able to play in a younger division but not an older one. For example, a 50-year-old forward can play in either the 40-, 45- or 50-year-old division, but he is not eligible to play in the 55 or higher. Goaltenders are the only exception to this rule. They can be 10 years younger than the requirement for a division, but have to be at least 40 years of age.

The teams in each division play a round-robin series, playing each other only once. Gold, Silver and bronze medals are awarded for the winners in each division.

== Countries represented ==
Teams from all over the world participate in the tournament. United States, Canada, Europe, and Japan have all been represented in past years. In the 36th Annual tournament in 2011, there were teams from 12 different states within the U.S., British Columbia and Alberta in Canada, and a team from Oslo, Norway.

== Ex-pros and celebrities ==
Schulz played in the tournament every year up until his death. He was a member of the Diamond Icers team that played their final game in the 75-year-old division. His son Monte Schulz also has played in the tournament.

The Snoopy Tournament has also attracted the attention of some retired pro National Hockey League players as well as some celebrities. Some of the former NHLers who have played in the tournament are Red Berenson, Ernie Hicke, Terry Harper, and Mel Bridgman, as well as the current general manager and Head Coach for the Portland Winterhawks, Jamie Kompon. Other notable participants in the tournament are television producer David E. Kelley, creator of The Practice and Ally McBeal, and Dave Filoni, animation director for Star Wars Rebels.

Mark Sertich, the Guinness World Records holder for being the oldest hockey player, also played in the tournament into his mid-90s. He died in August 2020 at the age of 99.

== Tournament dates ==
The 2019 tournament was cancelled due to renovations and ice repairs, and both the 2020 and 2021 tournaments were cancelled due to the COVID-19 pandemic.

Recent years tournament dates:

- 12-21 July, 2024
- 7-16 July, 2023
- 6–15 July, 2018
- 14–23 July, 2017
- 15–24 July 2016
- 10–19 July, 2015
- 11–20 July 2014
- 12–21 July, 2013
- 7–15 July 2012
- 9–16 July, 2011
