= Yoshiteru Otani =

Japanese artist (born 1958)

Yoshiteru Otani (大谷 芳照, Ōtani Yoshiteru; born 1958) is a Japanese artist best known for his Peanuts-inspired work. Otani is the creator of much of the artwork found in the Charles M. Schulz Museum and Research Center.

An exhibit of Otani's Peanuts-themed charcoal ink paintings, Peanuts: Found in Translation, was presented at the Schulz Museum from November 12, 2004, to April 11, 2005.
