= The Complete Peanuts =

Reprint book series

- The cover to the first volume

Publication information
- Publisher: Fantagraphics Books
- Schedule: Biannual
- Format: Hardcover, softcover
- Publication date: 2004 – 2016
- No. of issues: 26
- Main character(s): Snoopy, Woodstock, Charlie Brown, Sally Brown, Franklin, Lucy van Pelt, Linus van Pelt, Peppermint Patty

Creative team
- Created by: Charles M. Schulz
- Written by: Charles M. Schulz
- Artist: Charles M. Schulz
- Editor: Gary Groth

The Complete Peanuts is a series of books containing the entire run of Charles M. Schulz's long-running newspaper comic strip Peanuts, published by Fantagraphics Books. The series was published at a rate of two volumes per year, each containing two years of strips (except for the first volume, which includes 1950–1952). Slipcased sets of two volumes are also available. The series comprises a total of 26 volumes, including a final volume that was a collection of Schulz strips, cartoons, stories, and illustrations that appeared outside of the daily newspaper strip. These hardcover books were first published between 2004 and 2016. Later, Fantagraphics also began publishing the series in a softcover format. A companion series titled Peanuts Every Sunday, collecting only the Sunday strips of the Peanuts series, was launched by Fantagraphics in 2013 and ran until late 2022.

Schulz began to discuss an anthology of his work with Fantagraphics in 1997. The idea of a complete compendium of all published Peanuts strips was long resisted by Schulz; he did not want some early strips reprinted, as he felt they were not as good as the ones he drew later in his career. Approximately 2,000 of the 17,897 strips had never appeared in a previous U.S. collection.

The first book in the series was published in April 2004 and topped the New York Times Best Seller list.

== Volumes ==
Besides Schulz's work, each book contains an introduction by an influential individual (often with a connection to Schulz), an index of themes and characters, additional art by designer Seth (all of which are directly based on a specific Peanuts panel), and a biography of Schulz written by series editor Gary Groth. In addition, the first volume contains an interview with Schulz conducted by Groth and an extended biography. Sunday panels, which originally appeared in color, are presented in black and white in the series (a decision approved by Schulz's widow, Jean Schulz). The hardcover volumes measure 8.5 inches (220 mm) × 7 inches (180 mm) while the softcover volumes are 8.25 inches (210 mm) × 6.5 inches (170 mm).

All the characters on the covers (and their styles) match the time period each volume represents.

Volume 25, covering the years 1999 and 2000, also includes the complete run of Schulz's 1947–50 strip Li'l Folks. This precursor includes early versions of Charlie Brown and Snoopy. A 26th and final volume was announced in 2016 which includes hundreds of miscellaneous sketches, designs, short stories, and covers drawn by Schulz.

No.	Title	ISBN	Release date (Hardcover)	Release date (Softcover)	Cover art	Spine art	Introduction	Page count
1	The Complete Peanuts: 1950 to 1952	1-56097-589-X	May 17, 2004	June 8, 2014	Charlie Brown	Shermy	Garrison Keillor	346
2	The Complete Peanuts: 1953 to 1954	1-56097-614-4	October 17, 2004	November 2, 2014	Lucy van Pelt	Charlotte Braun	Walter Cronkite	344
3	The Complete Peanuts: 1955 to 1956	1-56097-647-0	April 17, 2005	June 30, 2015	Pig-Pen	Patty	Matt Groening	344
4	The Complete Peanuts: 1957 to 1958	1-56097-670-5	October 17, 2005	October 26, 2015	Snoopy	Violet Gray	Jonathan Franzen	314
5	The Complete Peanuts: 1959 to 1960	1-56097-671-3	May 17, 2006	May 17, 2016	Patty	Schroeder	Whoopi Goldberg (US edition); Russell T Davies (UK edition)	344
6	The Complete Peanuts: 1961 to 1962	1-56097-672-1	November 17, 2006	November 22, 2016	Schroeder	Snoopy	Diana Krall	344
7	The Complete Peanuts: 1963 to 1964	1-56097-723-X	May 1, 2007	August 15, 2017	Linus van Pelt	Lucy van Pelt	Bill Melendez	344
8	The Complete Peanuts: 1965 to 1966	1-56097-724-8	August 29, 2007	January 2, 2018	Charlie Brown	555 95472	Hal Hartley	344
9	The Complete Peanuts: 1967 to 1968	1-56097-826-0	April 23, 2008	May 1, 2018	Violet Gray	Linus van Pelt	John Waters	344
10	The Complete Peanuts: 1969 to 1970	1-56097-827-9	October 19, 2008	September 18, 2018	Snoopy (as the World War I Flying Ace)	Pig-Pen	Mo Willems	344
11	The Complete Peanuts: 1971 to 1972	1-60699-145-0	April 29, 2009	May 7, 2019	Sally Brown	Thibault	Kristin Chenoweth	344
12	The Complete Peanuts: 1973 to 1974	1-60699-286-4	September 8, 2009	October 22, 2019	Woodstock (with a larger shadow hanging over him)	Frieda	Billie Jean King	344
13	The Complete Peanuts: 1975 to 1976	1-60699-345-3	April 20, 2010	July 7, 2020	Frieda	Charlie Brown	Robert Smigel	344
14	The Complete Peanuts: 1977 to 1978	1-60699-375-5	September 27, 2010	November 24, 2020	Peppermint Patty	Sally Brown	Alec Baldwin	344
15	The Complete Peanuts: 1979 to 1980	1-60699-438-7	April 11, 2011	July 27, 2021	Charlie Brown	José Peterson	Al Roker	344
16	The Complete Peanuts: 1981 to 1982	1-60699-471-9	August 29, 2011	November 16, 2021	Linus van Pelt	Eudora	Lynn Johnston	344
17	The Complete Peanuts: 1983 to 1984	1-60699-523-5	April 3, 2012	May 31, 2022	Franklin	Roy	Leonard Maltin	344
18	The Complete Peanuts: 1985 to 1986	1-60699-572-3	September 19, 2012	November 8, 2022	Spike	Marcie	Patton Oswalt	344
19	The Complete Peanuts: 1987 to 1988	1-60699-634-7	April 6, 2013	July 25, 2023	Lucy van Pelt	Peppermint Patty	Garry Trudeau	344
20	The Complete Peanuts: 1989 to 1990	1-60699-680-0	October 18, 2013	December 5, 2023	Charlie Brown	Franklin	Lemony Snicket	344
21	The Complete Peanuts: 1991 to 1992	1-60699-726-2	June 8, 2014	April 2, 2024	Marcie	Woodstock	Tom Tomorrow	344
22	The Complete Peanuts: 1993 to 1994	1-60699-773-4	October 28, 2014	September 24, 2024	Peppermint Patty	Molly Volley	Jake Tapper	344
23	The Complete Peanuts: 1995 to 1996	1-60699-818-8	July 4, 2015	TBA	Snoopy (as the "World Famous Attorney")	Spike	RiffTrax/MST3K	348
24	The Complete Peanuts: 1997 to 1998	1-60699-860-9	November 9, 2015	TBA	Rerun van Pelt	Royanne Hobbs	Paul Feig	314
25	The Complete Peanuts: 1999 to 2000 Plus Li'l Folks	1-60699-913-3	May 10, 2016	TBA	Sally Brown	Truffles	Barack Obama	332
26	The Complete Peanuts: Comics and Stories	1-60699-957-5	November 22, 2016	TBA	Charlie Brown	Rerun van Pelt	Jean Schulz	344

=== Boxed sets ===
All of the volumes are also being released in boxed sets of two, housed in a specially designed slipcase.

Title	ISBN	Release date	Center character
The Complete Peanuts: 1950 to 1954	1-56097-632-2	October 17, 2004	Charlie Brown (Volume 1 cover)
The Complete Peanuts: 1955 to 1958	1-56097-687-X	October 17, 2005	Snoopy (Volume 4 cover)
The Complete Peanuts: 1959 to 1962	1-56097-774-4	November 17, 2006	Lucy van Pelt
The Complete Peanuts: 1963 to 1966	1-56097-868-6	August 29, 2007	Linus van Pelt (Volume 7 cover)
The Complete Peanuts: 1967 to 1970	1-56097-948-8	October 19, 2008	Snoopy (as the World War I Flying Ace) (Volume 10 cover)
The Complete Peanuts: 1971 to 1974	1-60699-287-2	September 8, 2009	Woodstock (Volume 12 cover)
The Complete Peanuts: 1975 to 1978	1-60699-376-3	September 27, 2010	Peppermint Patty (Volume 14 cover)
The Complete Peanuts: 1979 to 1982	1-60699-472-7	August 29, 2011	Schroeder
The Complete Peanuts: 1983 to 1986	1-60699-573-1	September 19, 2012	Spike (Volume 18 cover)
The Complete Peanuts: 1987 to 1990	1-60699-681-9	October 18, 2013	Sally Brown
The Complete Peanuts: 1991 to 1994	1-60699-774-2	October 28, 2014	Woodstock's bird friends
The Complete Peanuts: 1995 to 1998	1-60699-861-7	November 9, 2015	Lucy van Pelt
The Complete Peanuts: 1999 to 2000 and Comics and Stories	1-60699-958-3	November 22, 2016	Charlie Brown

=== Peanuts Every Sunday ===
Peanuts Every Sunday is a series featuring the Peanuts Sunday strips in full color. These books, unlike the Complete Peanuts series, were released one per year, in ten volumes covering half a decade each (except the first book, 1952–55). Slip-cased sets of two are also available.

Title	ISBN	Release date	Character(s) in focus	Introduction	Pages
Peanuts Every Sunday: 1952 to 1955	1-60699-692-4	December 2013	Charlie Brown	Jonathan Rosenbaum	288
Peanuts Every Sunday: 1956 to 1960	1-60699-794-7	November 2014	Lucy van Pelt	Chuck Klosterman	272
Peanuts Every Sunday: 1961 to 1965	1-60699-872-2	November 2015	Charlie Brown and Snoopy	Lucy Sante	288
Peanuts Every Sunday: 1966 to 1970	1-60699-968-0	November 2016	Lucy van Pelt and Snoopy	Max Apple	288
Peanuts Every Sunday: 1971 to 1975	1-68396-063-7	November 2017	Snoopy and Woodstock	Alexander Theroux	288
Peanuts Every Sunday: 1976 to 1980	1-68396-141-2	December 2018	Pig-Pen and Peppermint Patty		288
Peanuts Every Sunday: 1981 to 1985	1-68396-252-4	October 2019	Charlie Brown's baseball team		288
Peanuts Every Sunday: 1986 to 1990	1-68396-373-3	September 2020	Snoopy and Woodstock		264
Peanuts Every Sunday: 1991 to 1995	1-68396-463-2	November 2021	Snoopy and Woodstock		264
Peanuts Every Sunday: 1996 to 2000	1-68396-663-5	November 2022	Snoopy and Woodstock		264

Box sets

Title	ISBN	Release date
Peanuts Every Sunday: The 1950s Gift Box Set	978-1-60699-873-1	2015-12-07
Peanuts Every Sunday: The 1960s Gift Box Set	978-1-60699-969-1	2016-11-17
Peanuts Every Sunday: The 1970s Gift Box Set	978-1-68396-142-0	2018-11-15
Peanuts Every Sunday: The 1980s Gift Box Set	978-1-68396-374-5	2020-09-22
Peanuts Every Sunday: The 1990s Gift Box Set	978-1-68396-664-7	2022-11-29

Both the complete series and the Sunday collections are being published in hardback and paperback form, with different covers and supplemental artwork.

== Recognition ==
The Complete Peanuts have won several awards including:

Eisner Awards

- 2005 – "Best Archival Collection/Project"
- 2005 – "Best Publication Design" (Seth)
- 2007 – "Best Archival Collection/Project—Strips"

Harvey Awards

- 2005 – "Special Award for Excellence in Presentation"
- 2005 – "Best Domestic Reprint Project"
- 2007 – "Best Domestic Reprint Project"
- 2008 – "Best Domestic Reprint Project"
- 2009 – "Best Domestic Reprint Project"

== International editions ==
All international editions retain the artwork, layout, and format of the original American version (though some of the German volumes feature the original introductions, such as those by Matt Groening and Whoopi Goldberg, while others feature new ones by Germans such as Robert Gernhardt). As of January 2017, the following have been printed:

- Canongate Books started publication of a U.K. edition of the series in October 2007, with all of the volumes published; Volume 5 features a different introduction from the U.S. edition, by Russell T. Davies.
- Carlsen Comics began publication of a German edition of The Complete Peanuts in October 2006, under the title Peanuts Werkausgabe. All of the volumes have been released.
- The Portuguese release of Peanuts – Obra Completa by Edições Afrontamento started with the first two volumes in 2006, with the sixth released in 2011. There is no schedule for the publication of the following volumes.
- Dargaud started publishing The Complete Peanuts in France, under the title Snoopy – Intégrales, in November 2005; later volumes were re-titled Snoopy et les Peanuts. As of 2024, all volumes have been published.
- In Poland, Nasza Księgarnia began publishing the collected edition in 2008, under the title Fistaszki zebrane, with all volumes released.
- In Spain, Planeta DeAgostini is the publisher of Snoopy y Carlitos, with 25 volumes published as of 2024.
- In Brazil, L&PM Editores started publication in November 2009, under the title Peanuts Completo. Ten volumes have been released so far.
- In Italy, Panini Comics started publication in April 2005, maintaining the original title The Complete Peanuts. All of the volumes have been released.
- In China, Shaanxi Tourism Press Co. Ltd. first started a Chinese edition of The Complete Peanuts in October 2007. One volume (1950–1952) was published, and then the publication was stopped. Then, 21 Century Publishing Group started another Chinese edition of The Complete Peanuts in September 2009. Ten volumes (1950–1970) were published before the publication was stopped. Beijing Huawen Tianxia Changqingteng Books Issuance Co. Ltd. started a third Chinese edition of The Complete Peanuts in November 2015. Seventeen volumes (1950–1984) have been published so far, and more are expected to be coming.
- In Greece, Kathimerini started publishing Peanuts Every Sunday, in January 2022. The Greek publisher kept everything the American version has. The only difference is that they decided to divide every volume in half. So, until now, five volumes (1950–1975) have been published.
