= Charles M. Schulz =

American cartoonist (1922–2000)

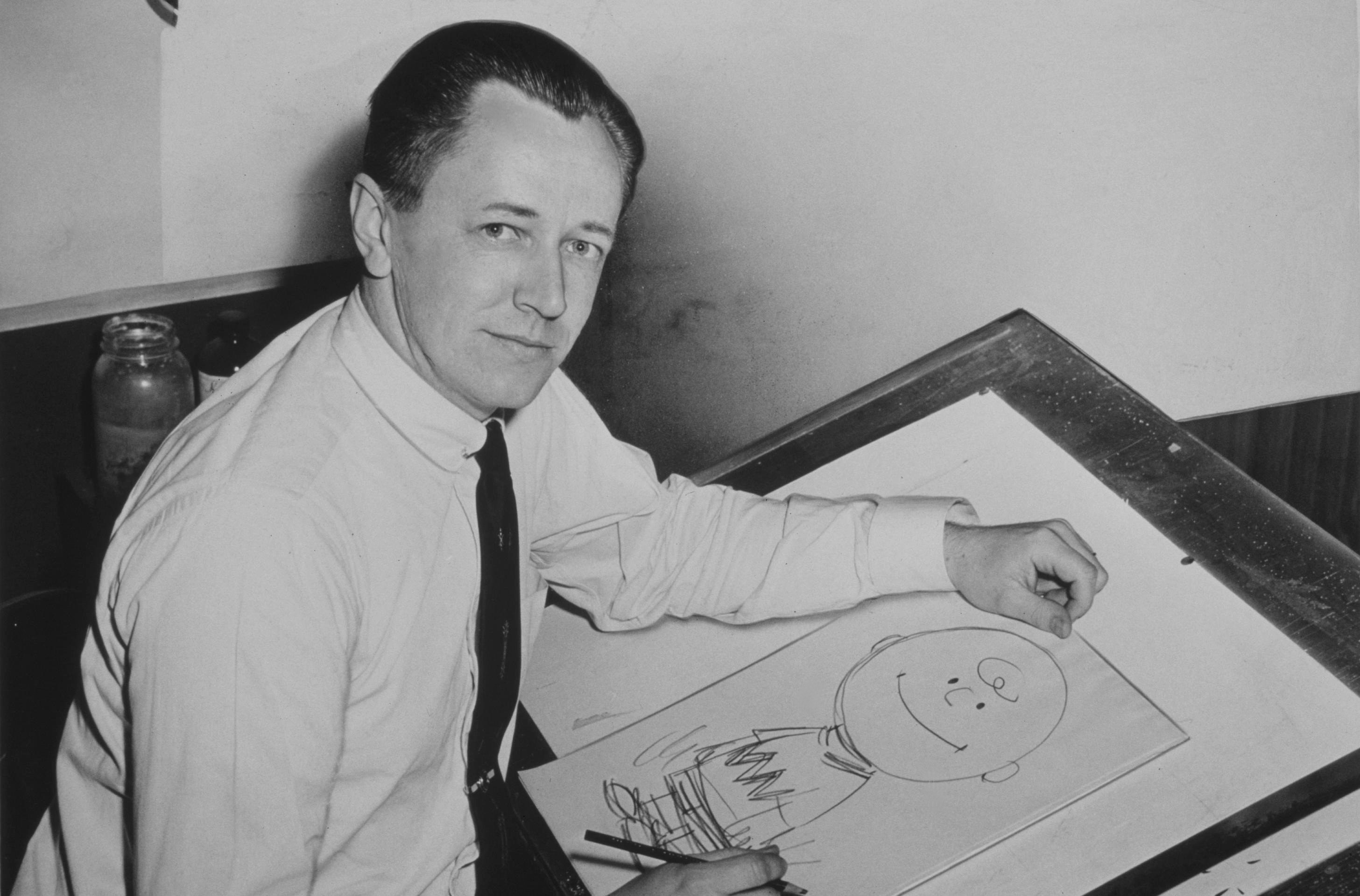
- Schulz drawing Charlie Brown in 1956
- Born: Charles Monroe Schulz; November 26, 1922 Minneapolis, Minnesota, U.S.
- Died: February 12, 2000 (aged 77) Santa Rosa, California, U.S.
- Areas: Cartoonist, Writer, Inker
- Notable works: Peanuts
- Spouses: Joyce Halverson (m. 1951; div. 1972); Jean Forsyth Clyde (m. 1973)
- Children: 5, including Meredith and Craig

- Military career
- Allegiance: United States
- Branch: United States Army
- Service years: 1942–1945
- Rank: Staff Sergeant
- Unit: 20th Armored Division
- Conflicts: World War II
- Other name: Sparky

Charles Monroe "Sparky" Schulz (/ʃʊlts/ SHUULTS; November 26, 1922 – February 12, 2000) was an American cartoonist who created the comic strip Peanuts, featuring the characters Charlie Brown and Snoopy.

Schulz was born in Minneapolis, Minnesota, and developed an interest in drawing while growing up in Saint Paul. He was conscripted in 1943 and served in the United States Army during the final years of World War II. After returning to Minnesota, Schulz began his comic strip career with Li'l Folks in 1947.

In 1950, Schulz redeveloped Li'l Folks as a four-panel comic strip and submitted it to United Features Syndicate, who renamed it Peanuts and began publishing that October. Schulz relocated to Northern California with his family in 1958. Beginning with A Charlie Brown Christmas in 1965, he helped write several animated television specials and four animated films based on his characters. He continued drawing Peanuts until his death in 2000.

Schulz is regarded as one of the most influential cartoonists in history, inspiring many cartoonists including Jim Davis, Murray Ball, Bill Watterson, Jeff Smith, Matt Groening, and Dav Pilkey as well as animators like Oscar-nominee Don Hertzfeldt and The Peanuts Movie (2015) director Steve Martino. He was inducted into the United States Hockey Hall of Fame in 1983 and the Hollywood Walk of Fame in 1996, and was posthumously inducted into the United States Figure Skating Hall of Fame in 2007.

== Early life and education ==
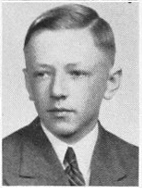
Schulz's high school yearbook photo, 1940

Charles Monroe Schulz was born on November 26, 1922, in Minneapolis, Minnesota, and grew up in nearby Saint Paul. He was the only child of the barber Carl Fredrich August Schulz and Dena Bertina (née Halverson), and was of German and Norwegian descent. His uncle called him "Sparky" after the horse Spark Plug in Billy DeBeck's comic strip Barney Google, which Schulz enjoyed reading. Schulz attended Saint Paul Central High School, and played baseball, golf, and ice hockey there.

Schulz loved drawing and sometimes drew his family dog, Spike, who ate unusual things, such as pins and tacks. In 1937, Schulz drew a picture of Spike and sent it to Ripley's Believe It or Not!. His drawing appeared in Robert Ripley's syndicated panel, captioned, "A hunting dog that eats pins, tacks, and razor blades is owned by C. F. Schulz, St. Paul, Minn." and "Drawn by 'Sparky'". Schulz's drawings were rejected by his high school yearbook. A five-foot-tall statue of Snoopy was placed in the school's office 60 years later. After graduating, Schulz took a correspondence course from Art Instruction Schools.

== Military service and post-war positions ==
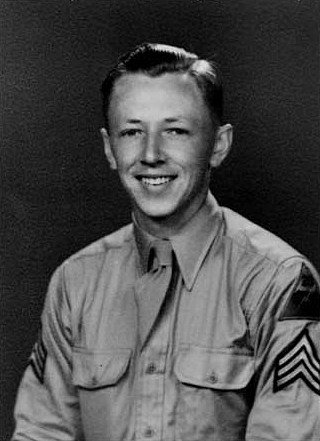
United States Army portrait of Sergeant Schulz, c. 1943

In November 1942, Schulz was drafted into the United States Army. He served as a staff sergeant with the 20th Armored Division in Europe during World War II as a squad leader on a .50 caliber machine gun team. His unit saw combat at the very end of the war. Schulz said he had only one opportunity to fire his machine gun but forgot to load it, and that the German soldier he could have fired at surrendered. Years later, Schulz proudly spoke of his wartime service. For being under fire he received the Combat Infantryman Badge, of which he was proud.

In February 1943, Schulz's mother died at age 50, after a long battle with cervical cancer. Schulz was with her as she died at home and later described his sadness that she never saw his work published. In late 1945, Schulz returned to Minnesota, where he did lettering for a Roman Catholic comic magazine, Timeless Topix. In July 1946, Schulz took a job at Art Instruction, where he reviewed and graded students' work. He worked there for several years as he developed his career as a comic creator. At the school, he proposed marriage to a redhaired accountant, Donna Johnson, who turned him down. Johnson inspired the Little Red-Haired Girl, Charlie Brown's unrequited love, in Peanuts.

== Career ==
The anti-Communist propaganda comic book Is This Tomorrow (1947) featured some of Schulz's early work. Schulz's first group of regular cartoons, a weekly series of one-panel jokes called Li'l Folks, was published from June 1947 to January 1950 in the St. Paul Pioneer Press, with Schulz usually doing four one-panel drawings per issue. It was in Li'l Folks that Schulz first used the name Charlie Brown for a character, although he applied the name in four gags to three different boys as well as one buried in sand. The series also had a dog that looked much like Snoopy. In May 1948, Schulz sold his first one-panel drawing to The Saturday Evening Post; within the next two years, a total of 17 untitled drawings by Schulz were published in the Post, simultaneously with his work for the Pioneer Press. Around the same time, he tried having Li'l Folks syndicated through the Newspaper Enterprise Association; Schulz would have been an independent contractor for the syndicate, unheard of in the 1940s, but negotiations broke down. Li'l Folks was dropped from the Pioneer Press in January 1950.

Later that year, Schulz approached United Feature Syndicate (UFS) with Li'l Folks, and the syndicate became interested. By that time, Schulz had also developed a comic strip, usually using four panels rather than one; to Schulz's delight, the syndicate preferred the longer version. However, to his consternation, the syndicate had to change the title for Schulz's strip for legal reasons. Schulz begrudgingly accepted the name Peanuts, allegedly taken from the phrase "peanut gallery".

Peanuts first appeared on October 2, 1950, in seven newspapers. The weekly Sunday page debuted on January 6, 1952. After a slow start, Peanuts eventually became one of the most popular comic strips in history, as well as one of the most influential. Schulz also had a short-lived sports-oriented comic strip, It's Only a Game (1957–59); however, he abandoned it after the success of Peanuts. From 1956 to 1965 he contributed a gag cartoon, Young Pillars, featuring teenagers, to Youth, a publication associated with the Church of God.

In 1957 and 1961, Schulz illustrated two volumes of Art Linkletter's Kids Say the Darndest Things. In 1964, he illustrated a collection of letters, Dear President Johnson, by Bill Adler.

In 1962, Schulz published a book, Happiness is a Warm Puppy, which spent 42 weeks on The New York Times Best Seller list.

=== Peanuts ===
At its height, Peanuts was published daily in 2,600 papers in 75 countries, in 21 languages. Over nearly 50 years, Schulz drew 17,897 published Peanuts strips. The strips, plus merchandise and product endorsements, produced revenues of more than $1 billion per year, with Schulz earning an estimated $30–40 million annually. During the strip's run, Schulz took only one vacation, a five-week break in late 1997 to celebrate his 75th birthday; reruns of the strip ran during his vacation, the only time that occurred during Schulz's life.

Rinehart & Company published the first collection of Peanuts strips in July 1952. Many more books followed, greatly contributing to the strip's increasing popularity. In 2004, Fantagraphics began their Complete Peanuts series. Peanuts also proved popular in other media; the first animated TV special, A Charlie Brown Christmas, aired in December 1965 and won an Emmy award. Numerous TV specials followed, the latest being Snoopy Presents: A Summer Musical in 2025. Until his death, Schulz wrote or co-wrote the TV specials, as well as the films A Boy Named Charlie Brown, Snoopy Come Home, Race for Your Life, Charlie Brown and Bon Voyage, Charlie Brown (and Don't Come Back!!), and oversaw their production.

New York City's Macy's Thanksgiving Day Parade has featured a gigantic balloon-version of a Peanuts character since 1968.

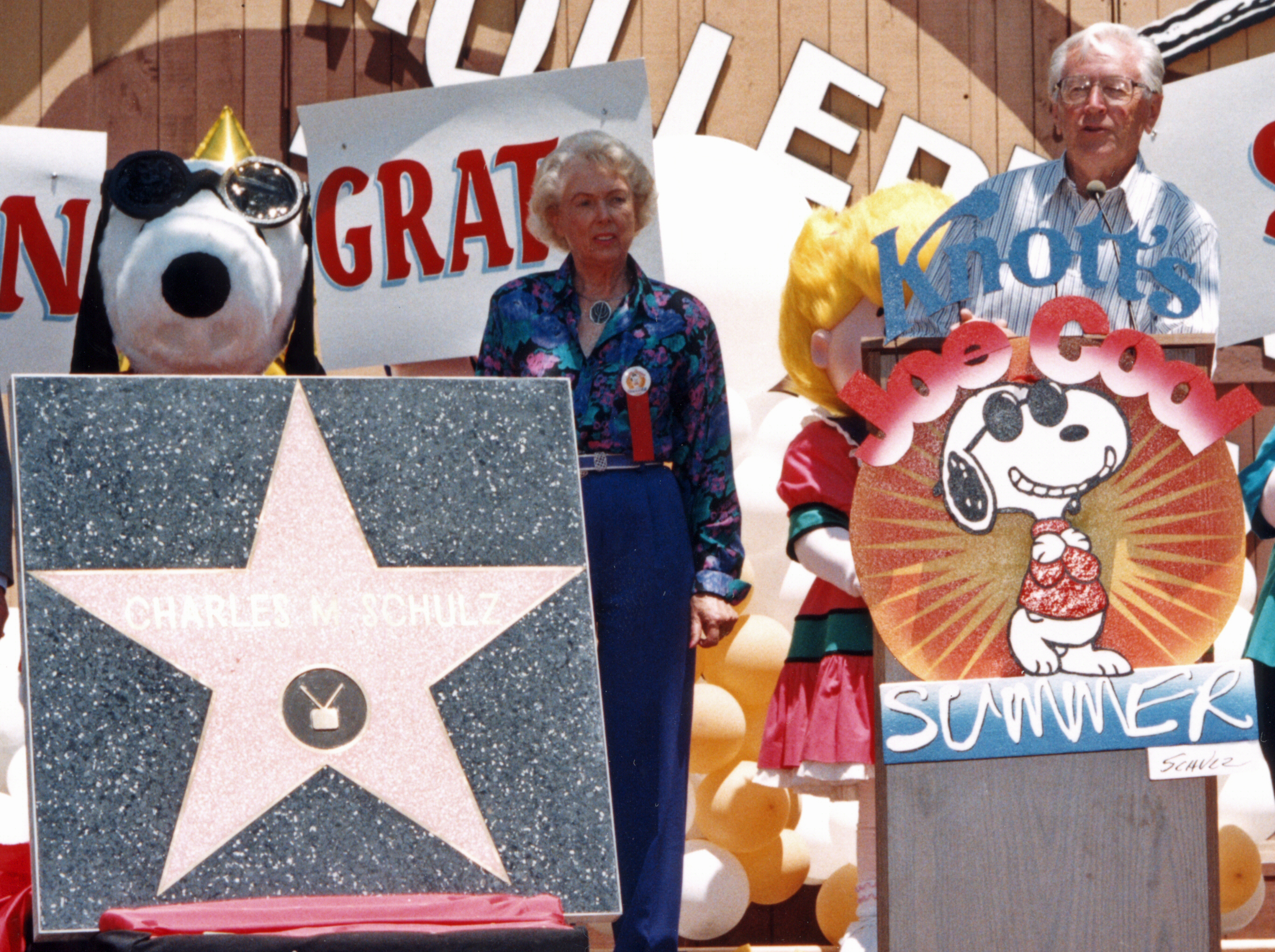
Schulz receiving his star on the Hollywood Walk of Fame at Knott's Berry Farm in June 1996

Charlie Brown, the principal character of Peanuts, was named after a co-worker at Art Instruction Inc. Schulz drew much from his own life. Some examples include:

- Like Charlie Brown's parents, Schulz's father was a barber and his mother a housewife.
- Like Charlie Brown, Schulz had often felt shy and withdrawn. In an interview with Charlie Rose in May 1997, Schulz observed, "I suppose there's a melancholy feeling in a lot of cartoonists, because cartooning, like all other humor, comes from bad things happening."
- Schulz reportedly had an intelligent dog when he was a boy. Although this dog was a pointer, not a beagle like Snoopy, family photos confirm a certain physical resemblance.
- References to Snoopy's brother Spike living outside of Needles, California, were influenced by the few years (1928–30) the Schulz family lived there; they moved to Needles to join other family members who had relocated from Minnesota to tend to an ill cousin.
- Schulz's inspiration for Charlie Brown's unrequited love for the Little Red-Haired Girl was Donna Mae Johnson, an Art Instruction Inc. accountant with whom he fell in love. When Schulz finally proposed to her in June 1950, shortly after he had made his first contract with his syndicate, she turned him down and married another man.
- Linus and Shermy were named for his good friends Linus Maurer and Sherman Plepler, respectively.
- Peppermint Patty was inspired by Patricia Swanson, one of his cousins on his mother's side. Schulz devised the character's name when he saw peppermint candies in his house.
- Sally calls Linus her "Sweet Babboo." The term of endearment was inspired by a phrase Jean Schulz used for her husband, "I called him, 'Sweet Babboo' and instead of saying, 'O, that's clever, I think I'll use that,' it just showed up six weeks later in the comic strip!"

=== Influences ===
The Charles M. Schulz Museum cites Milton Caniff (Terry and the Pirates) and Bill Mauldin as key influences on Schulz's work. In his own strip, Schulz regularly described Snoopy's annual Veterans Day visits with Mauldin, including mention of Mauldin's World War II cartoons. Schulz also credited George Herriman (Krazy Kat), Roy Crane (Wash Tubbs), Elzie C. Segar (Thimble Theatre) and Percy Crosby (Skippy) as influences. In a 1994 address to fellow cartoonists, Schulz discussed several of them. But according to his biographer Rheta Grimsley Johnson:

It would be impossible to narrow down three or two or even one direct influence on [Schulz's] personal drawing style. The uniqueness of "Peanuts" has set it apart for years ... That one-of-a-kind quality permeates every aspect of the strip and very clearly extends to the drawing. It is purely his with no clear forerunners and no subsequent pretenders.

According to the museum, Schulz watched the 1941 film Citizen Kane 40 times. The character Lucy van Pelt also expresses a fondness for the film; in one strip, she cruelly spoils the ending for her younger brother.

Biographer David Michaelis wrote that Schulz considered Jim Davis, the author of Garfield, his greatest rival. Schulz disliked Davis's low, broad-appeal approach and was jealous when Garfield eclipsed Peanuts in popularity. However, Schulz frequently provided advice to the younger Davis, particularly in the realms of merchandising and franchising, by using the strategy he had developed for Snoopy and allowing Davis to develop it further for Garfield. Davis considered Schulz a valuable mentor. Davis credits Schulz with redesigning Garfield in his modern form; while Schulz and Davis were working on their Peanuts and Garfield television specials in adjacent rooms, Davis was struggling to work Garfield's obese, quadrupedal physique into physical gags and asked Schulz for ideas. Schulz sketched out a redesign—bipedal and pot-bellied but slimmer—that Davis has used in its basic form since.

Schulz had a mutual respect for Robb Armstrong, the author of Jump Start; for the 1994 special You're in the Super Bowl, Charlie Brown, Schulz gave Franklin the last name "Armstrong" in homage. Armstrong would later collaborate with Schulz's sons on the streaming special "Welcome Home, Franklin", part of the Apple TV+ series Snoopy Presents.

== Personal life ==
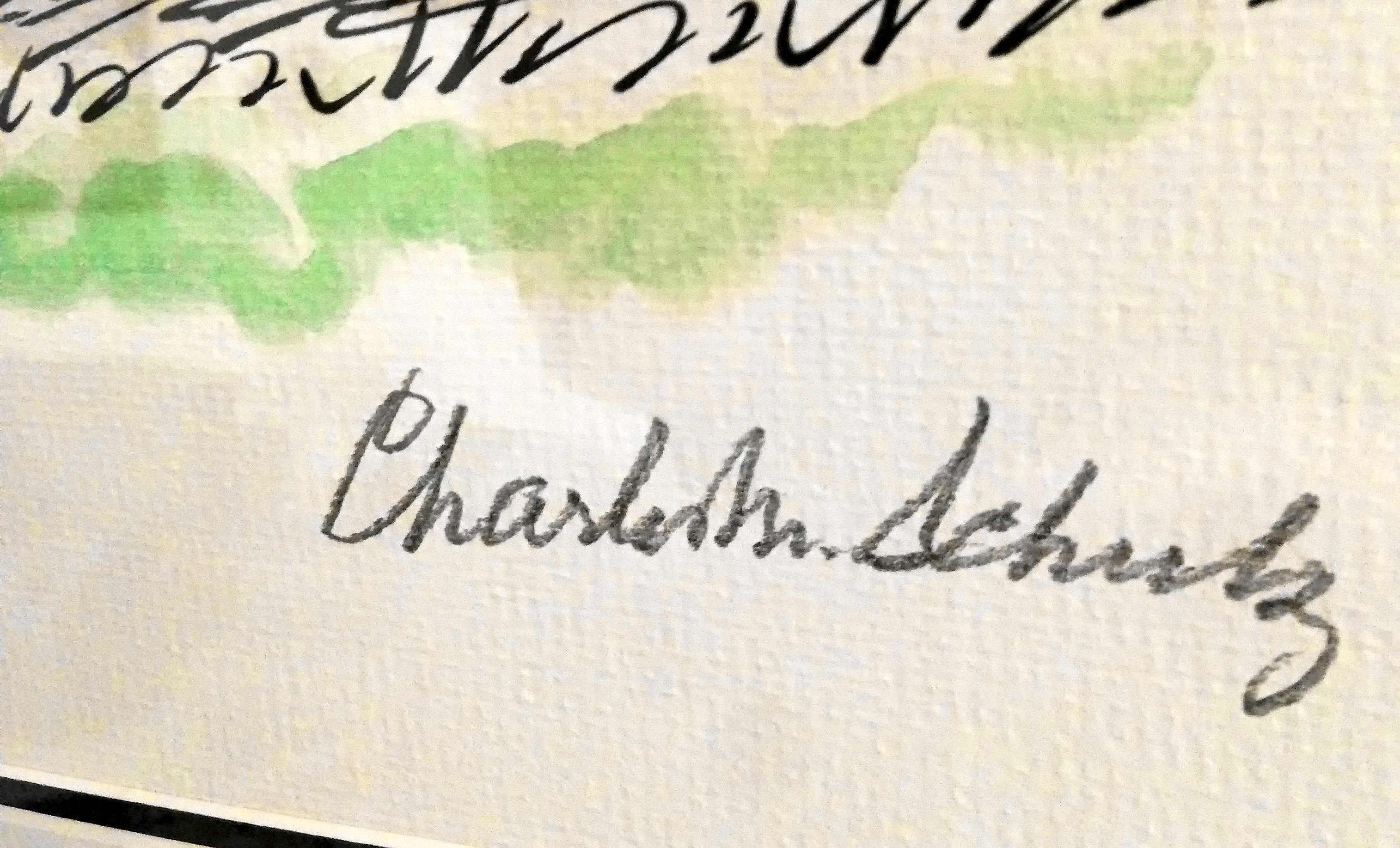
Schulz's Signature ("Play Ball" Lithograph) in 2024

In April 1951, Schulz married Joyce Halverson, who was not related to his mother Dena Halverson Schulz. He also adopted Halverson's daughter, Meredith Hodges. Later the same year, they moved to Colorado Springs, Colorado. Their son, Monte, was born in February 1952; three more children, Craig, Amy and Jill, were born later in Minnesota.

Schulz and his family moved to Minneapolis and stayed until 1958. They then moved to Sebastopol, California, where Schulz built his first studio. Until then, he had worked at home or in a small rented office room. It was there that Schulz was interviewed for the unaired television documentary A Boy Named Charlie Brown. Some of the footage was eventually used in a later documentary, Charlie Brown and Charles Schulz. Schulz's father died while visiting him in 1966, the same year Schulz's Sebastopol studio burned down.

By 1969, Schulz had moved to Santa Rosa, California, where he lived and worked until his death. While briefly living in Colorado Springs, Schulz painted a mural on the bedroom wall of his daughter Meredith, featuring Patty with a balloon, Charlie Brown jumping over a candlestick, and Snoopy playing on all fours. The wall was removed in 2001, and donated and relocated to the Charles M. Schulz Museum in Santa Rosa.

By Thanksgiving of 1970, Schulz's marriage was strained. That year, he had a brief affair with a 25-year-old woman named Tracey Claudius. The Schulzes divorced in 1972, and in September 1973, he married Jean Forsyth Clyde, whom he had first met when she brought her daughter to his hockey rink. They were married for 27 years, until Schulz's death.

Schulz's son Craig has served as president of the Charles M. Schulz Creative Associates licensing company, located at One Snoopy Place in Santa Rosa, and has had a prominent role in modern Peanuts adaptations, including The Peanuts Movie (2015). Schulz's daughter Jill starred in the 1988 live action and animation hybrid Peanuts special It's the Girl in the Red Truck, Charlie Brown.

=== Kidnapping attempt ===
On May 8, 1988, two gunmen in ski masks entered Schulz's home through an unlocked door, planning to kidnap Jean, but the attempt failed when Schulz's daughter Jill drove up to the house, prompting the would-be kidnappers to flee. Sonoma County Sheriff Dick Michaelsen said, "It was obviously an attempted kidnap-ransom. This was a targeted criminal act. They knew exactly who the victims were." Neither Schulz nor Jean were hurt during the incident.

=== Sports ===
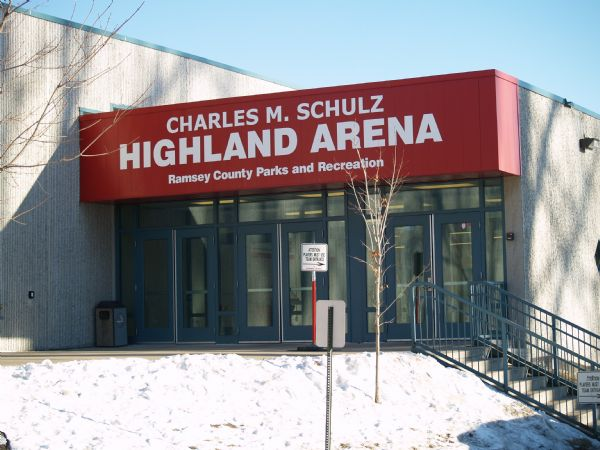
Charles M. Schulz Highland Arena in 2007

Schulz had a long association with ice sports, and both figure skating and ice hockey featured prominently in his cartoons. In Santa Rosa, he built and owned the Redwood Empire Ice Arena, which opened in 1969: it acquired the nickname "Snoopy's Home Ice" and featured a snack bar called "The Warm Puppy Café". Schulz's daughter Amy served as a model for the figure skating in the television special She's a Good Skate, Charlie Brown (1980). Schulz also was very active in adult amateur hockey; in 1975, he organized Snoopy's Senior World Hockey Tournament at his Redwood Empire Ice Arena and would play each year with a team he formed named the "Diamond Icers", skating in his final tournament in 1999 in the 75-and-over division. He was awarded the Lester Patrick Trophy in 1981, given by the NHL and USA Hockey for outstanding service to the sport of hockey in the United States. Schulz also enjoyed golf and was a member of the Santa Rosa Golf and Country Club from 1959 until his passing. In 2000, the Ramsey County Board in St. Paul, Minnesota, voted to rename the Highland Park Ice Arena near his childhood home the Charles M. Schulz–Highland Arena in his honor. Schulz also used his hockey rink for tennis exhibitions after meeting Billie Jean King.

=== Art ===
Schulz's favorite artist in his later years was Andrew Wyeth. As a young adult, Schulz developed a passion for classical music. Although the piano-playing character Schroeder in Peanuts adored Ludwig van Beethoven, Schulz's favorite composer was Johannes Brahms. He had a strong respect for the Footrot Flats creator Murray Ball; the two influenced each other throughout their careers.

=== Religion ===
According to a 2015 "spiritual biography", Schulz's faith was complex and personal. He often touched on religious themes in his work, including in the classic television cartoon A Charlie Brown Christmas (1965), which features Linus quoting Luke 2 to explain "what Christmas is all about." Schulz said that Linus represented his spiritual side, and the spiritual biography points out a much wider array of religious references.

Brought up in a Lutheran family, Schulz was active in the Church of God as a young adult and later taught Sunday school at a United Methodist Church. In the 1960s, Robert L. Short interpreted certain themes and conversations in Peanuts as consistent with parts of Christian theology, and used them as illustrations in his lectures on the Gospel, as explained in his book The Gospel According to Peanuts, the first of several he wrote on religion, Peanuts, and popular culture.

Schulz's daughter, Amy, joined the Church of Jesus Christ of Latter-day Saints during her relationship with a Latter-day Saint boyfriend. According to Amy, Schulz told her that the "church is either true or it's a hoax. And I think it's a hoax." Although Schulz was disenchanted by Mormonism and his daughter's conversion, he continued to support her and, according to Amy, told her that he appreciated the bond between the two of them created by her belief "in Christ and the scriptures."

From the late 1980s, Schulz said in interviews that some people had described him as a "secular humanist" but that he did not know one way or the other:

I do not go to church anymore ... I guess you might say I've come around to secular humanism, an obligation I believe all humans have to others and the world we live in.

In 2013, Schulz's widow said:

I think that he was a deeply thoughtful and spiritual man. Sparky was not the sort of person who would say "oh that's God's will" or "God will take care of it." I think to him that was an easy statement, and he thought that God was much more complicated.

When he came back from the army he was very lonely. His mother had died and he was invited to church by a pastor who had prepared his mother's service from the Church of God. Sparky's father was worried about him and was talking to the pastor and so the pastor invited Sparky to come to church. So Sparky went to church, joined the youth group and for a good 4–5 years he went to Bible study and went to church 3 times a week (2 Bible studies, 1 service). He said he had read the Bible through three times and taught Sunday school. He was always looking for what those passages REALLY might have meant. Some of his discussions with priests and ministers were so interesting because he wanted to find out what these people (who he thought were more educated than he) thought.

When he taught Sunday school, he would never tell people what to believe. God was very important to him, but in a very deep way, in a very mysterious way.

=== Failing health and retirement ===
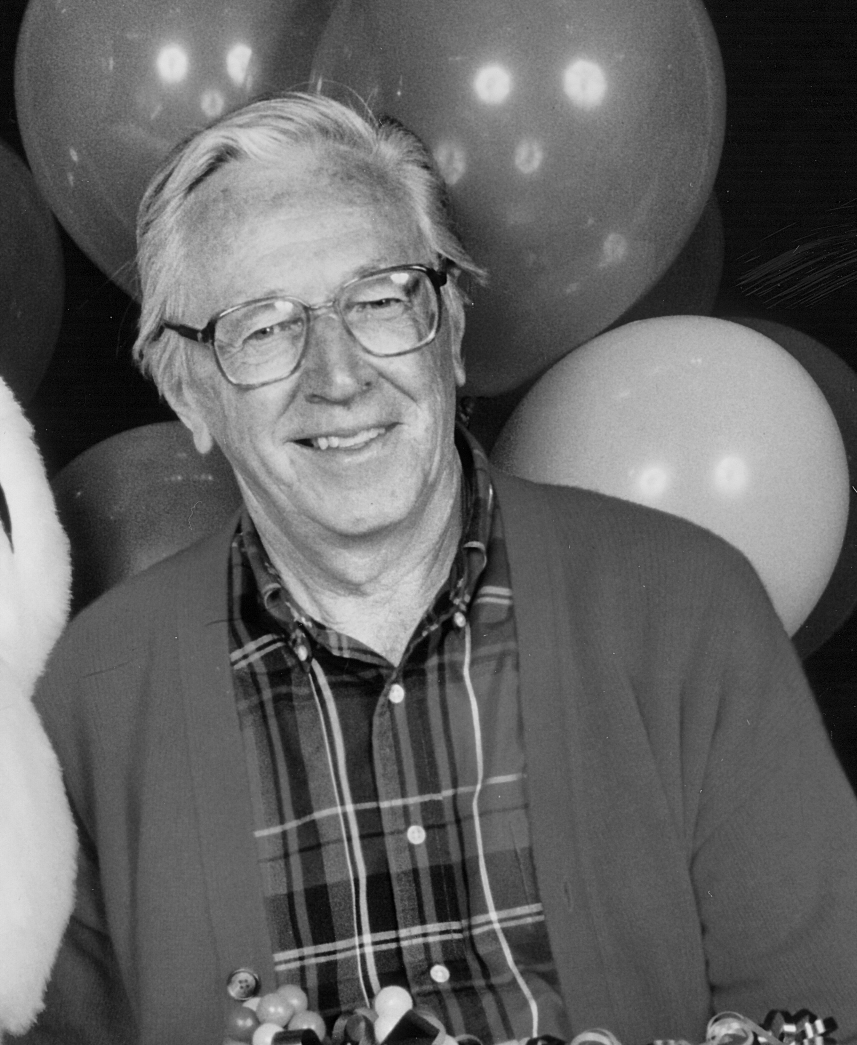
Schulz in 1993

In July 1981, Schulz underwent heart bypass surgery. During his hospital stay, President Ronald Reagan phoned to wish him a quick recovery.

In the 1980s, Schulz complained that "sometimes my hand shakes so much I have to hold my wrist to draw." This led to an erroneous impression that Schulz had Parkinson's disease. According to a letter from his physician, placed in the Archives of the Charles M. Schulz Museum by his widow, Schulz had essential tremor, a condition alleviated by beta blockers. Schulz still insisted on writing and drawing the strip by himself, resulting in noticeably shakier lines over time.

In November 1999, Schulz suffered several small strokes and a blocked aorta; he was later found to have colorectal cancer that had metastasized. Because of the chemotherapy and because he could not see clearly, he announced his retirement on December 14, 1999. The decision was difficult for Schulz, who told Al Roker on The Today Show, "I never dreamed that this was what would happen to me. I always had the feeling that I would probably stay with the strip until I was in my early eighties. But all of a sudden it's gone. It's been taken away from me. I did not take this away from me."

Schulz was asked if, in his final Peanuts strip, Charlie Brown would finally get to kick the football after so many decades (one of the many recurring themes in Peanuts was Charlie Brown's attempts to kick a football while Lucy was holding it, only to have Lucy pull it back at the last moment, causing him to fall). His response, "Oh, no. Definitely not. I couldn't have Charlie Brown kick that football; that would be a terrible disservice to him after nearly half a century." But in a December 1999 interview, holding back tears, Schulz recounted the moment when he signed his final strip, saying, "All of a sudden I thought, 'You know, that poor, poor kid, he never even got to kick the football. What a dirty trick—he never had a chance to kick the football.'"

== Death ==
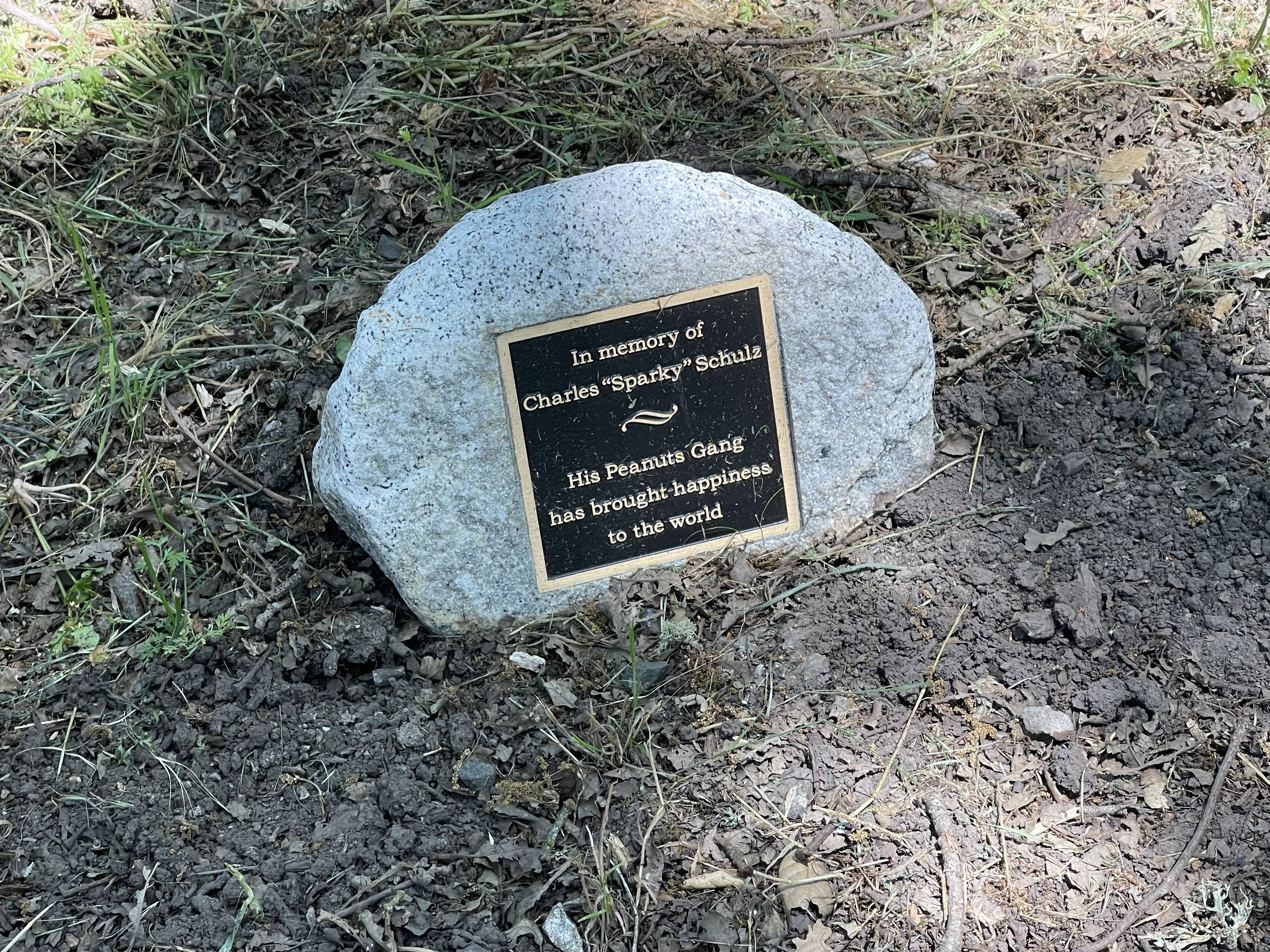
A memorial to Charles M. Schulz at the Santa Rosa Rural Cemetery (2023)

Schulz died in his sleep of a heart attack in his Santa Rosa home on February 12, 2000, at the age of 77. He was suffering from colorectal cancer. The last original Peanuts strip was published the following day. He had predicted that the strip would outlive him because the strips were usually drawn weeks before their publication. Schulz was buried at Pleasant Hills Cemetery in Sebastopol, California, where he first lived after relocating from Minnesota.

Family and associates, including Jean Schulz, Lynn Johnston and Rick Kirkman, paid tribute to him via media outlets. Over 40 syndicated cartoonists in addition to Kirkman and Johnston paid homage to Schulz and Peanuts on May 27 by incorporating his characters into their over 100 comic strips that day, including Garfield by fellow associate Jim Davis and Dilbert by Scott Adams.

While UFS retained ownership of the strip, Schulz requested that the syndicator allow no other artist to draw Peanuts. UFS honored his wishes, instead syndicating reruns. Because Schulz considered other media separate from the strip, new television specials and comic books with the Peanuts characters have been made since his death.

== Awards ==
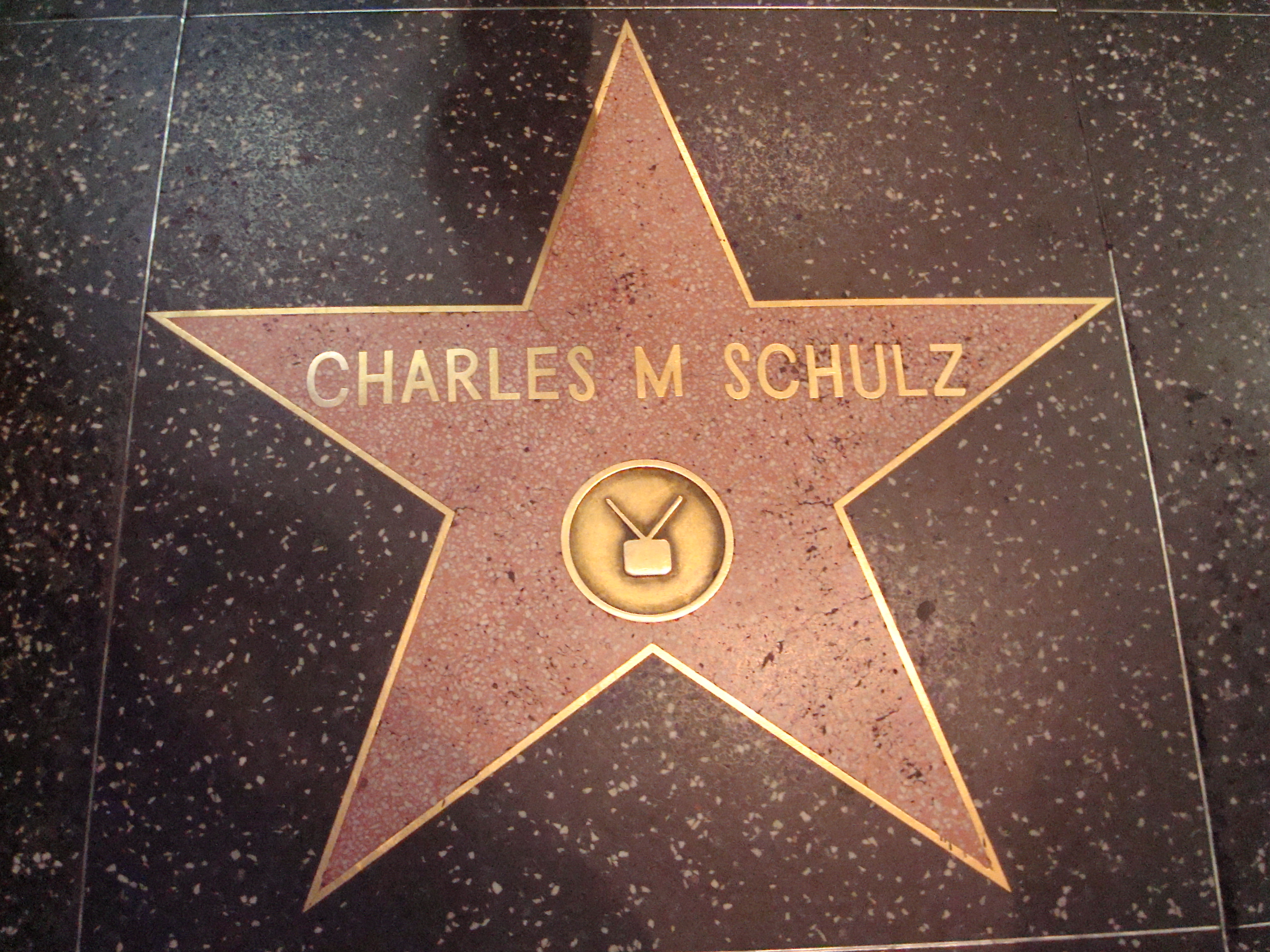
Schulz's star on the Hollywood Walk of Fame in 2008

In 1966, A Charlie Brown Christmas received an Emmy Award for Outstanding Children's Program.

Schulz received the National Cartoonists Society's Humor Comic Strip Award in 1962 for Peanuts and the Society's Elzie Segar Award in 1980; he was the first two-time winner of their Reuben Award (for 1955 and 1964) and the winner of their Milton Caniff Lifetime Achievement Award in 1999. He was also an avid hockey fan; in 1981, Schulz was awarded the Lester Patrick Trophy for outstanding contributions to the sport of hockey in the United States, and he was inducted into the United States Hockey Hall of Fame in 1993.

In 1988, the Boy Scouts of America, a youth organization, honored Schulz with its Silver Buffalo Award. He was recognized for his service to American youth. On June 28, 1996, Schulz received a star on the Hollywood Walk of Fame, adjacent to Walt Disney's. A replica of this star appears outside his former Santa Rosa studio. On November 2, 2015, Snoopy was also honored with a star on the Hollywood Walk of Fame.

On January 1, 1974, Schulz served as the Grand Marshal of the Rose Parade in Pasadena, California. This led to the only Peanuts strip in which he made any reference to himself: Lucy was watching the parade, and told Linus that the Grand Marshal was somebody "you've never heard of". The same year, he received the Inkpot Award. In 1980, Schulz received the Golden Plate Award of the American Academy of Achievement, presented by Awards Council member Judge John Sirica. Schulz was a keen bridge player, and Peanuts occasionally included bridge references. In 1997, the American Contract Bridge League (ACBL) awarded both Snoopy and Woodstock the honorary rank of Life Master. Schulz was delighted.

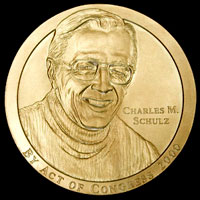
Charles M. Schulz Congressional Gold Medal in 2000

On February 10, 2000, two days before Schulz's death, Congressman Mike Thompson introduced H.R. 3642, a bill to award Schulz the Congressional Gold Medal, the highest civilian honor the United States legislature can bestow. The bill passed the House (with only Ron Paul voting no and 24 not voting) on February 15, and the bill was sent to the Senate, where it passed unanimously on May 2. The Senate also considered a related bill, S.2060 (introduced by Dianne Feinstein). President Bill Clinton signed the bill into law on June 20, 2000. On June 7, 2001, Schulz's widow Jean accepted the award on behalf of her late husband in a public ceremony.

Schulz was inducted into the United States Figure Skating Hall of Fame in 2007. Schulz was the inaugural recipient of the Harvey Kurtzman Hall of Fame Award, accepted by Karen Johnson, Director of the Charles M. Schulz Museum, at the 2014 Harvey Awards, held at the Baltimore Comic Convention in Baltimore, Maryland. The U.S. Postal Service commemorated the 100th anniversary of Schulz's birth with postage stamps honoring him "alongside his beloved characters".

== Military awards and decorations ==
U.S. service medals
World War II Victory Medal
Army Good Conduct Medal
European–African–Middle Eastern Campaign Medal
American Campaign Medal
Army of Occupation Medal
U.S. Army badges and patches
Combat Infantryman Badge
20th Armored Division

== Biographies ==
Multiple biographies have been written about Schulz, including Rheta Grimsley Johnson's Good Grief: The Story of Charles M. Schulz (1989), which Schulz authorized.

The lengthiest biography, Schulz and Peanuts: A Biography (2007) by David Michaelis, was widely criticized by the Schulz family; Schulz's son Monte stated it has "a number of factual errors throughout ... [including] factual errors of interpretation", and he extensively documents these errors in a number of essays. However, Michaelis maintains that there is "no question" his work is accurate. Although cartoonist Bill Watterson (creator of Calvin and Hobbes) feels the biography does justice to Schulz's legacy, while giving insight into the emotional impetus of the creation of the strips, cartoonist and critic R.C. Harvey regards the book as falling short both in describing Schulz as a cartoonist and in fulfilling Michaelis' stated aim of "understanding how Charles Schulz knew the world". Harvey believes that Michaelis' biography inductively bends the facts to a thesis rather than logically deducing a thesis from the facts. Dan Shanahan's review, in the American Book Review (vol 29, no. 6), of Michaelis' biography faults the biography not for factual errors, but for "a predisposition" to finding problems in Schulz's life to explain his art, regardless of how little the material lends itself to Michaelis' interpretations. Shanahan cites, in particular, such things as Michaelis' crude characterizations of Schulz's mother's family, and "an almost voyeuristic quality" to the hundred pages devoted to the breakup of Schulz's first marriage.

In light of Michaelis' biography and the controversy surrounding his interpretation of Charles Schulz's personality, responses from Schulz's family reveal some intimate details about Schulz's persona beyond his artistry.

In August 2023, author and comic artist Francesco Matteuzzi and comic artist Luca Debus, both longtime Peanuts fans, wrote and illustrated Funny Things: A Comic Strip Biography of Charles M. Schulz. In panels styled after his famous work, Schulz himself narrates the story of his own life. The biography received positive reviews, with The Comics Journal noting, "at the end of 2023, it was welcomed by many critics and readers as one of the most interesting graphic novels of that year."

== Legacy ==
A proponent of crewed spaceflight, Schulz was honored with the naming of Apollo 10 command module Charlie Brown and lunar module Snoopy, which launched on May 18, 1969. The Communications Carrier Assembly, a cloth cap containing headphones and microphones worn within the Apollo space suit, was nicknamed the Snoopy cap because it resembled Snoopy's white head and black ears. The Silver Snoopy award is given to NASA employees and contractors for outstanding achievements related to human flight safety or mission success. The award certificate states that it is in appreciation for "professionalism, dedication and outstanding support that greatly enhanced space flight safety and mission success".

In the 1970s, Shuntarō Tanikawa began translating Peanuts into Japanese, leading to the strip's popularity in Japan. To this day in Japan there are multiple Snoopy-themed hotels, attractions, cafés, teahouses and stores, including the Snoopy Museum in Tokyo, managed by the Charles M. Schulz Museum.

On July 1, 1983, Camp Snoopy opened at Knott's Berry Farm; it is a forested, mountain-themed area featuring the Peanuts characters. It has rides designed for younger children and is one of the most popular areas of the amusement park. Since, similar Camp Snoopy and Planet Snoopy areas have opened at several Six Flags parks.

When the Mall of America in Bloomington, Minnesota, opened in 1992, its amusement park had a Peanuts theme and was called Camp Snoopy, which was replaced by Nickelodeon Universe in 2006, when the mall lost the rights to use the characters.

The Jean and Charles Schulz Information Center at Sonoma State University opened in 2000 and now stands as one of the largest buildings in the California State University system, as well as in all of California, with a 400,000-volume general collection and a 750,000-volume automated retrieval system capacity. The $41.5 million building was named after Schulz, and his wife donated the $5 million needed to build and furnish the structure.

In 2000, the Sonoma County Board of Supervisors renamed the county airport the Charles M. Schulz–Sonoma County Airport. The airport's logo features Snoopy in goggles and scarf, taking to the skies on top of his red doghouse.

Peanuts on Parade has been St. Paul, Minnesota's tribute to its favorite native cartoonist. It began in 2000 with the placing of 101 5-foot-tall (1.5 m) statues of Snoopy throughout the city of St. Paul. Every summer for the following four years, statues of a different Peanuts character were placed on the sidewalks of St. Paul: Charlie Brown Around Town (2001), Looking for Lucy (2002), Linus Blankets St. Paul (2003) and Snoopy lying on his doghouse (2004). The statues were auctioned off at the end of each summer, so some remain around the city, but others have been relocated. The auction proceeds were used for artist's scholarships and for permanent bronze statues of the Peanuts characters, which are in Landmark Plaza and Rice Park in downtown St. Paul.

The Charles M. Schulz Museum and Research Center in Santa Rosa opened in August 2002, two blocks away from his former studio, celebrating his life's work and the art of cartooning. A bronze statue of Charlie Brown and Snoopy stands in Depot Park in downtown Santa Rosa.

Santa Rosa, California, celebrated the 55th anniversary of the strip in 2005 by continuing the Peanuts on Parade tradition, beginning with It's Your Town, Charlie Brown (2005), Summer of Woodstock (2006), Snoopy's Joe Cool Summer (2007), and Look Out For Lucy (2008).

In 2006, Forbes ranked Schulz as the third-highest-earning deceased celebrity, for he had earned $35 million in the previous year. In 2009, he was ranked sixth. According to Tod Benoit, Schulz's income during his lifetime totaled more than $1.1 billion.

When asked about Schulz's impact in a 2007 interview, cartoonist Bill Watterson said, "Peanuts pretty much defines the modern comic strip, so even now it's hard to see it with fresh eyes. The clean, minimalist drawings, the sarcastic humor, the unflinching emotional honesty, the inner thoughts of a household pet, the serious treatment of children, the wild fantasies, the merchandising on an enormous scale – in countless ways, Schulz blazed the wide trail that most every cartoonist since has tried to follow."

Schulz's Santa Rosa home was destroyed by the Tubbs Fire, one of the October 2017 wildfires in California.

On November 26, 2022, over 75 American syndicated cartoonists honored Schulz on what would have been his 100th birthday.
