= Snoopy cap =

Part of American space suits

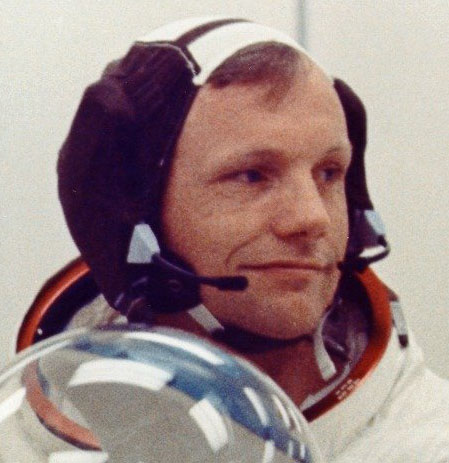
Neil Armstrong wearing a Snoopy cap

A Snoopy cap, or communication cap, is a part of a space suit worn by American astronauts on the head and incorporating an audio headset for communication. The cap is nicknamed after the Peanuts character, whom its black and white paneling resembled. Its NASA designation is Communications Carrier Assembly. The "Snoopy cap" includes two earphones and two microphones, to tolerate failure of a single unit.
