= Charles M. Schulz Museum and Research Center =

American museum

Coordinates: 38°27′35.98″N 122°44′6.15″W

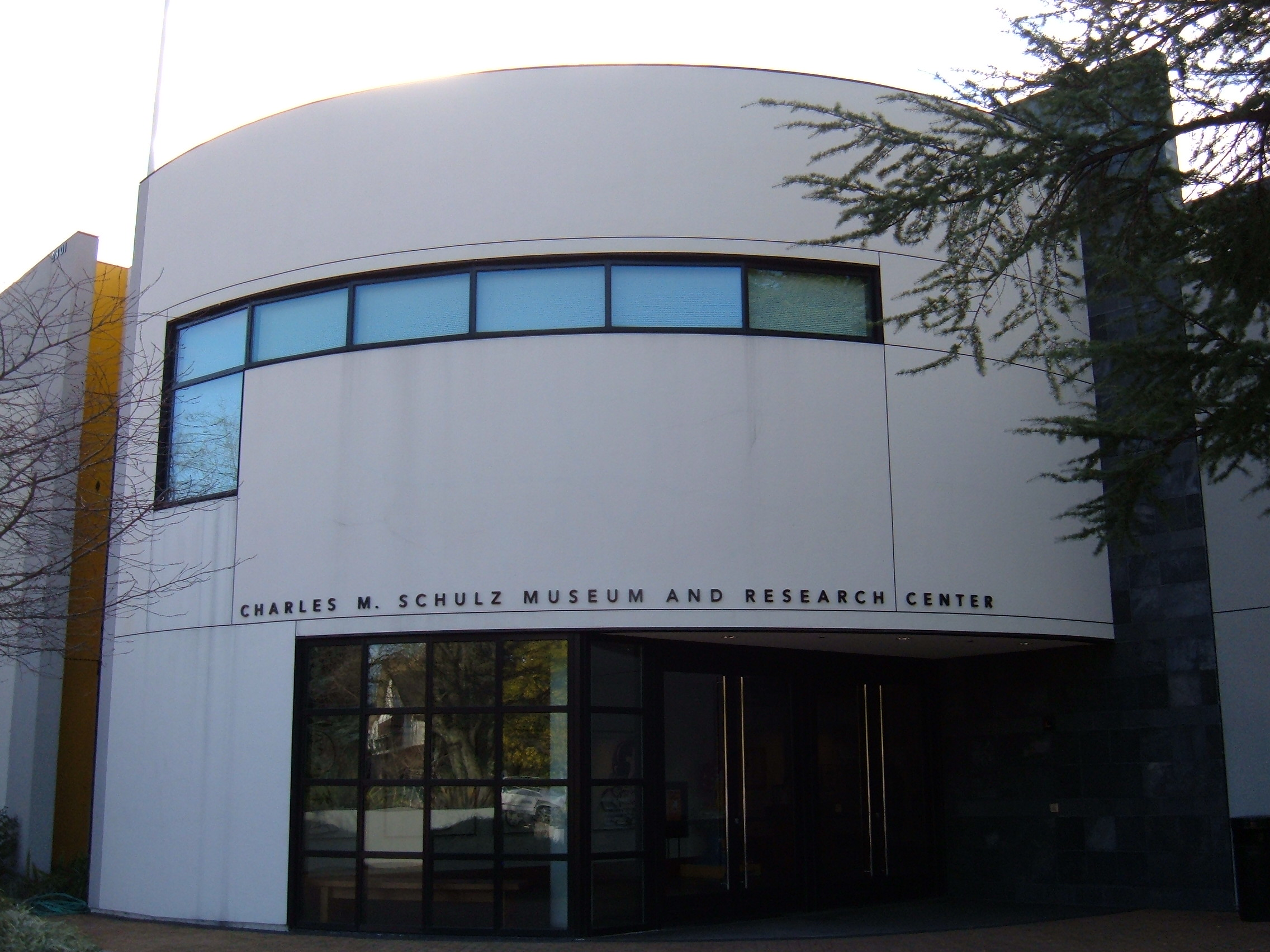
- Established: 2002
- Location: Santa Rosa, California
- Director: Gina Huntsinger
- Curator: Benjamin L. Clark
- Website: schulzmuseum.org

The Charles M. Schulz Museum and Research Center is a museum dedicated to the works of Charles M. Schulz, creator of the Peanuts comic strip. The museum opened on August 17, 2002, two years after Schulz died, and is in Santa Rosa, California.

The museum is home to many of the original Peanuts strips, as well as other artwork by Schulz. Two works by Japanese artist Yoshiteru Otani dominate the Great Hall: a 3.5-ton wood sculpture depicting the evolution of Snoopy and a 22 ft (6.7 m)-high ceramic mural made of 3,588 Peanuts strips which combine to form the image of Lucy van Pelt holding the football for Charlie Brown to kick it. Among the museum's permanent exhibits are a work by Christo which depicts Snoopy's doghouse wrapped, an exhibition of foreign language editions of Peanuts books, Schulz's personal studio and tributes to Schulz from other artists. Inside the museum are three rotating galleries with exhibits that change every six months. The museum is open daily, except for Tuesdays, from 11:00 a.m. to 5:00 p.m.

== Gallery ==
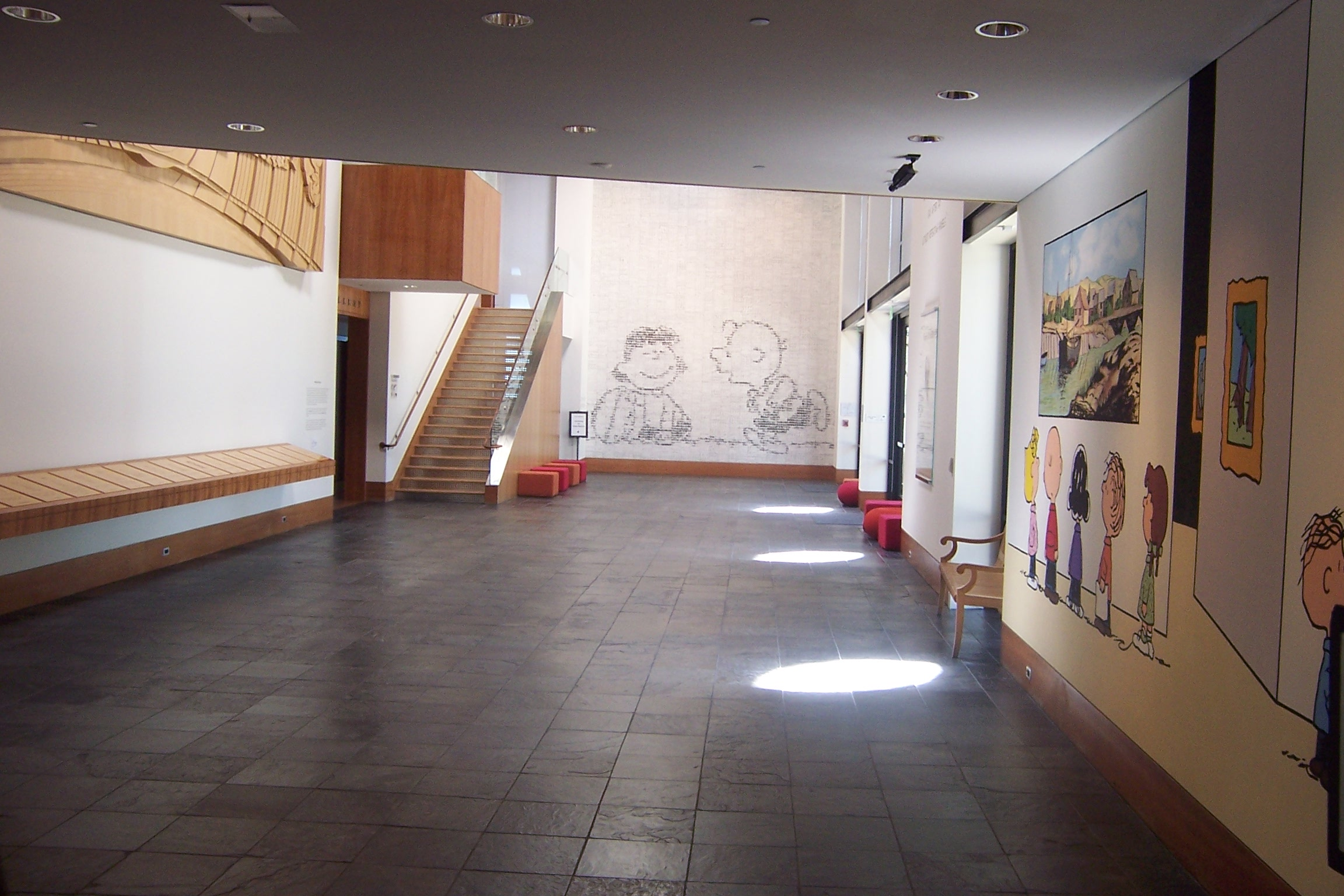
The Great Hall: portions of the wood sculpture on the left, the strips mural in the center, featuring Charlie Brown and Lucy.

== See also ==
- Cartoon Art Museum – comics museum in San Francisco that presents the "Sparky Award", named in honor of Charles M. Schulz
