= Peanuts =

Comic strip by Charles M. Schulz

- The Peanuts gang Top row left to right: Woodstock, Snoopy, Charlie Brown; Bottom row left to right: Franklin, Lucy Van Pelt, Linus Van Pelt, Peppermint Patty, Sally Brown
- Author: Charles M. Schulz
- Owner: United Feature Syndicate (1950–1978); United Media (1978–2010); Peanuts Holdings LLC (2010–present)
- Website: www.peanuts.com
- Current status/schedule: Concluded, in reruns
- Launch date: October 2, 1950 (dailies); January 6, 1952 (Sundays)
- End date: January 3, 2000 (dailies); February 13, 2000 (Sundays)
- Syndicates: United Feature Syndicate (1950–2011); Andrews McMeel Syndication (2011–present)
- Genre(s): Humor, gag-a-day, satire, children
- Preceded by: Li'l Folks

Peanuts (Note: Subtitled featuring "Good ol' Charlie Brown" from November 1966 to January 1987) is a syndicated daily and Sunday American comic strip written and illustrated by Charles M. Schulz, which eventually expanded into a media franchise. The strip originally ran from October 2, 1950 to February 13, 2000, continuing in reruns afterward. Its precursor Li'l Folks ran from 1947 to 1950. Peanuts is regarded as one of the most popular and influential comic strips in history, with 17,897 strips published in all, making it "arguably the longest story ever told by one human being". At the time of Schulz's death in 2000, Peanuts ran in over 2,600 newspapers, with a readership of roughly 355 million across 75 countries, and had been translated into 21 languages. It helped to cement the four-panel gag strip as the standard in the United States, and together with its merchandise earned Schulz more than $1 billion. Following successful animated television and stage-theatrical adaptations over the years, five animated theatrical films have been released. It is also one of the highest-grossing media franchises of all time.

Peanuts focuses on a social circle of young children, where adults exist but are rarely seen or heard. The main character, Charlie Brown, is meek, nervous, and lacks self-confidence. He cannot fly a kite, win a baseball game, or kick a football held by his irascible friend Lucy Van Pelt, who always pulls it away at the last instant. Peanuts is a literary strip with philosophical, psychological, and sociological overtones, which was innovative in the 1950s. Its humor is psychologically complex and driven by the characters' interactions and relationships.

Schulz drew every strip, through nearly 50 years, with no assistants, including the lettering and coloring process.

== Title ==
Peanuts was originally sold under the title of Li'l Folks, but that had been used before, so they said we have to think of another title. I couldn't think of one and somebody at United Features came up with the miserable title Peanuts, which I hate and have always hated. It has no dignity and it's not descriptive. [...] What could I do? Here I was, an unknown kid from St. Paul. I couldn't think of anything else. I said, why don't we call it Charlie Brown and the president said "Well, we can't copyright a name like that." I didn't ask them about Nancy or Steve Canyon. I was in no position to argue.

— Charles Schulz, in a 1987 interview with Frank Pauer in Dayton Daily News and Journal Herald Magazine

Peanuts was originally titled Li'l Folks, a weekly panel cartoon that appeared in the St. Paul Pioneer Press (Schulz's hometown newspaper) from 1947 to 1950. Li'l Folks marked the first appearance of the name "Charlie Brown", also featuring a dog that looked much like the early 1950s version of Snoopy.

Schulz submitted his Li'l Folks cartoons to United Features Syndicate (UFS), who responded with interest. In response, he visited their office in New York City, but instead of bringing the panels he submitted, he presented some new comic strips he had worked on, which, after viewing, UFS said they preferred. While UFS was preparing to syndicate it under the name Li'l Folks, Tack Knight, who authored the retired 1930s comic strip Little Folks, objected to the title being used. Schulz argued in a letter to Knight that the contraction of Little to Li'l was intended to avoid this conflict, but conceded that the final decision would be for his syndicate. After it was confirmed that Little Folks was a registered trademark, a different name for Schulz's strip became necessary. The production manager of UFS noted the popularity of the children's program Howdy Doody, which featured an audience of children who were seated in the "Peanut Gallery", and were referred to as "Peanuts". This led to the decided title for the comic strip to be forced upon Schulz.

Schulz hated the title Peanuts, which remained a source of irritation to him throughout his life. He accused the production manager at UFS of not having seen the comic strip before giving it a title, saying that the title would only make sense if there were a character named "Peanuts". On the day it was syndicated, Schulz's friend visited a newsstand in uptown Minneapolis and asked if any newspapers carried Peanuts, to which the newsdealer replied, "No, and we don't have any with popcorn either", which confirmed Schulz's fears concerning the title. Whenever Schulz was asked what he did for a living, he would evade mentioning the title and say, "I draw that comic strip with Snoopy in it, Charlie Brown and his dog". Schulz later said in 1997 that he had discussed changing the title to Charlie Brown on multiple occasions in the past, but found that it would cause problems with licensees who already incorporated the existing title into their products, making it costly to change.

== Characters ==
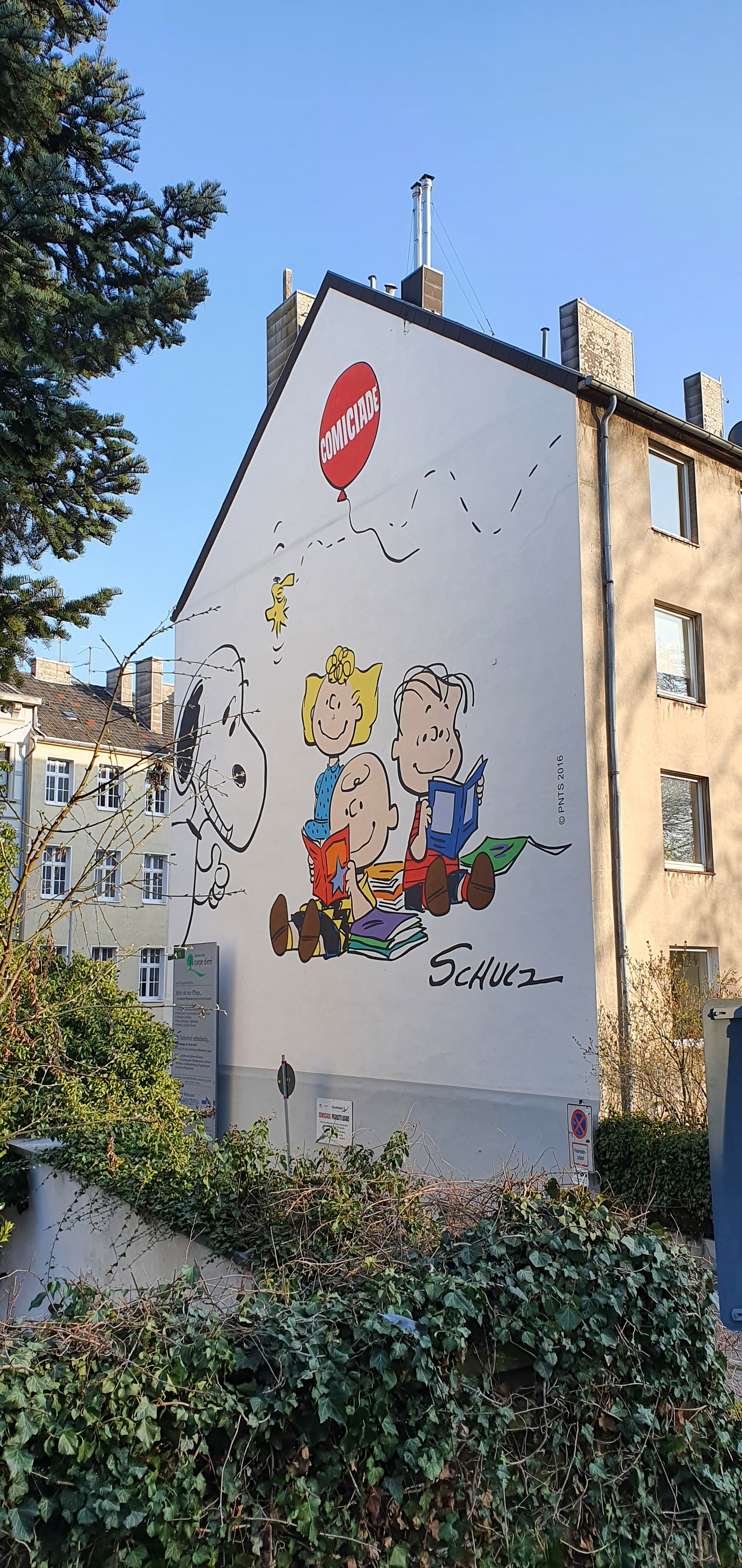
Official Peanuts mural in Aachen in 2021.

=== Charlie Brown ===
Charlie Brown is the main character, a young boy acting as the center of the strip's world and serving as an everyman. While seen as decent, considerate, and reflective, he is also awkward, deeply sensitive, and said to suffer from an inferiority complex. Charlie Brown is a constant failure: he can never win a ballgame, nor can he successfully fly a kite. His sense of determination, regardless of the certainty of failure, can be interpreted as either self-defeating stubbornness or admirable persistence. When he fails, however, he experiences pain and anguish through self-pity. The journalist Christopher Caldwell observed this tension between Charlie Brown's negative and positive attitudes, stating: "What makes Charlie Brown such a rich character is that he's not purely a loser. The self-loathing that causes him so much anguish is decidedly not self-effacement. Charlie Brown is optimistic enough to think he can earn a sense of self-worth." Schulz named Charlie Brown after a colleague of his while working at Art Instruction, whose full name was Charlie Francis Brown.

Readers and critics have explored whether Schulz based Charlie Brown on himself. This question often carried the suggestion that the emotionally sensitive and depressed behavior of Charlie Brown drew from Schulz's own life or childhood experiences. Commenting on the tendency of these conclusions being drawn, Schulz said in a 1968 interview, "I think of myself as Charles Schulz. But if someone wants to believe I'm really Charlie Brown, well, it makes a good story." He explained in another interview that the comic strip as a whole is a personal expression, and so it is impossible to avoid all the characters presenting aspects of his personality. Biographer David Michaelis made a similar conclusion, describing Charlie Brown as simply representing Schulz's "wishy-washiness and determination". Regardless, some profiles of Schulz confidently held that Charlie Brown was based on him.

=== Snoopy ===
Snoopy is Charlie Brown's pet dog, who later in the development of the strip would be described as a beagle. While generally behaving like a real dog and having a non-speaking role, he connects to readers through having human thoughts. Despite acting like a real dog some of the time, Snoopy possesses many different anthropomorphic traits. He frequently walks on his hind legs and is able to use tools, including his typewriter. He introduces fantasy elements to the strip by extending his identity through various alter egos. Many of these alter egos, such as a "world-famous" attorney, surgeon, or secret agent, were seen only once or twice, although others (such as the World War I flying ace, or the sunglasses-wearing "Joe Cool") were featured many times over a period of years. His character is a mixture of innocence and egotism; he possesses childlike joy, while on occasion being somewhat selfish. He has an arrogant commitment to his independence but is often shown to be dependent on humans. Schulz was careful in balancing Snoopy's life between that of a real dog and that of a fantastical character. While the exterior of Snoopy's doghouse is of small dimensions, the interior is described in the strip as having such things as a recreation room, a library, a pool table, and being adorned with paintings of Andrew Wyeth and Van Gogh. However, it was never shown, as it would have demanded an inappropriate kind of suspension of disbelief from readers.

=== Linus and Lucy ===
Linus and Lucy are siblings; Linus is the younger brother, and Lucy is the older sister.

Lucy is bossy, selfish, and opinionated, and she often delivers commentary in an honest, albeit offensive and sarcastic way. Schulz described Lucy as full of misdirected confidence, but having the virtue of being capable of cutting right down to the truth. He said that Lucy is mean because it is funny, particularly because she is a girl: he posited that a boy being mean to girls would not be funny at all, describing a pattern in comic strip writing where it is comical when supposedly weak characters dominate supposedly strong characters. Lucy, at times, acts as a psychiatrist and charges five cents for psychiatric advice to other characters (usually Charlie Brown) from her "psychiatric booth", a booth parodying the setup of a lemonade stand. Lucy's role as a psychiatrist has attracted attention from real-life individuals in the field of psychology; the psychiatrist Athar Yawar playfully identified various moments in the strip where her activities could be characterized as pursuing medical and scientific interests, commenting that "Lucy is very much the modern doctor".

Linus is Charlie Brown's most loyal and uplifting friend and introduces intellectual, spiritual, and reflective elements to the strip. He offers opinions on topics such as literature, art, science, politics, and theology. He possesses a sense of morality and ethical judgment that enables him to navigate topics such as faith, intolerance, and depression. Linus acts as a philosopher and an open ear to Charlie Brown's dilemmas and worries. Schulz enjoyed the adaptability of his character, remarking he can be "very smart" as well as "dumb". He has a tendency to express lofty or pompous ideas that are quickly rebuked. He finds psychological security from thumb sucking and holding a blanket for comfort. The idea of his "security blanket" originated from Schulz's own observation of his first three children, who carried around blankets. Schulz described Linus's blanket as "probably the single best thing that I ever thought of". He was proud of its versatility for visual humor in the strip, and of how the phrase "security blanket" entered the dictionary.

=== Peppermint Patty and Marcie ===
Peppermint Patty and Marcie are two girls who are friends. They attend a different school than Charlie Brown, on the other side of town, and so represent a slightly different social circle from the other characters.

Peppermint Patty is a tomboy who is forthright and loyal and has what Schulz described as a "devastating singleness of purpose". She frequently misunderstands things, to the extent that her confusion serves as the premise of many individual strips and stories; in one story she prepares for a "skating" competition, only to learn with disastrous results that it is for roller skating and not ice skating. She struggles at school and with her homework, and often falls asleep in school. The wife of Charles Schulz, Jean Schulz, suggested that this is the consequence of how Peppermint Patty's single father works late; she stays awake at night waiting for him. In general, Charles Schulz imagined that some of her problems were from having an absent mother.

Marcie is bookish and a good student. Schulz described her as relatively perceptive compared to other characters, stating that "she sees the truth in things" (although she perpetually addresses Peppermint Patty as "sir"). The writer Laura Bradley identified her role as "the unassuming one with sage-like insights".

=== Supporting characters ===
In addition to the core cast, other characters appeared regularly for a majority of the strip's duration:

- Sally Brown is the younger sister of Charlie Brown. She has a habit of fracturing the English language to comical effect. She reacts negatively to school and homework due to dealing with dogmatic memorization and obeying ambiguous instructions. She otherwise confidently delivers speeches in oral exams, using wordplay and puns while framing her topics with theatrics and suspense. Sally harbors a long-standing, unrequited crush on Linus van Pelt, affectionately referring to him as her "Sweet Baboo"—a nickname that Linus firmly and repeatedly rejects with the exclamation, "I am not your Sweet Baboo!"
- Schroeder is a boy who is fanatic about Beethoven. Each year he celebrates Beethoven's birthday, though on occasion he does forget and struggles to forgive himself. In this relatively innocent role, he serves as an outlet for the expressions of other characters. He most recognizably appears in the strip playing music on his toy piano, as the catcher on Charlie Brown's baseball team and the romantic foil to Lucy's unrequited affections who is always after a kiss especially when it's Beethoven's birthday.
- Pig-Pen is a physically dirty boy, normally appearing with a cloud of dust surrounding him. Schulz acknowledged that the scope of his role is limited, but he continued to make appearances because of his popularity with readers.
- Franklin is an African American boy who first appeared at the suggestion of a reader following the assassination of Martin Luther King Jr. Since Schulz intended to achieve this without being patronizing, he is a relatively normal character who mainly reacts to the oddness of other characters.
- Woodstock is a bird and Snoopy's friend. He entirely communicates through peeps, which leaves it up to readers to guess what he says. Schulz said that Woodstock is aware that he is small and inconsequential, a role that serves as a lighthearted existential commentary on coping with the much larger world.
- Spike is Snoopy's brother who lives alone in the California desert.

As well as the above, several other characters were introduced and then faded out of prominence during the strip's run:

- Shermy, a boy with a crew cut, was introduced as one of Charlie Brown's friends in the first strip in 1950, but began disappearing by the end of the decade, last appearing in 1969. Schulz came to dislike Shermy, describing him as "an extra little boy", and only used him when he required a character with "little personality".
- Patty, another original character introduced in 1950, was initially a core character before her appearances dwindled to just being a sidekick or background character, especially after Peppermint Patty's arrival. Her last appearance was in 1995.
- Violet Gray, introduced in 1951, became memorable for her near-continual abuse of Charlie Brown, especially not inviting him to parties and bragging about her affluent father. Her last appearance was in 1996.
- Charlotte Braun was introduced in 1954 as a female counterpart to Charlie Brown, but her unpopularity led to Schulz "killing her off" in a tongue-in-cheek letter to a fan in 1955.
- Frieda, memorable for her "naturally curly hair" and attempts to make Snoopy chase rabbits, first appeared in 1961 but was already an infrequent character by 1970. She last appeared in 1985 after a seven-year absence.
- Rerun, Lucy and Linus' younger brother, first appeared in 1973 and continued appearing until the final strip in 2000. Initially a background character, Rerun became a foreground character by the 1990s.
- Eudora, a friend of Sally's from summer camp, arrived in 1978 and had one of the shortest tenures in the strip, last appearing in 1987.
- Lydia, a classmate of Linus' who seemed to have a lukewarm romantic interest in him, was introduced in 1986 and appeared as a regular recurring character until 1999.

== History ==
=== Early development: 1950–1955 ===
Peanuts began as a daily strip on October 2, 1950, in seven newspapers: Minneapolis Tribune, Schulz's hometown newspaper; The Washington Post; Chicago Tribune; The Denver Post; The Seattle Times; and two newspapers in Pennsylvania, Evening Chronicle (Allentown) and Globe-Times (Bethlehem). Schulz had to draw the strip in four equally sized panels so that editors could run the strip horizontally, vertically, or 2-by-2. By October 1951, the strip appeared in 36 newspapers. Schulz sought to rival the reach of other newspaper comics at the time, such as Pogo,which appeared in 80 newspapers, or Nancy, which appeared in 200.

Peanuts first appeared as a half-page format Sunday strip in newspapers on January 6, 1952, at the time appearing in 40 newspapers across US. By this point the design of the characters had less exaggerated proportions and slightly more realistic postures. Schulz indicated that the strip had reached a certain level of stylistic maturity, recommending against the reprinting of very early strips when book publisher Rinehart & Company proposed that the strips from the first year of Peanuts be collected into a book. Over the course of four years, the strip began to syndicate outside of the US, being translated into Spanish and syndicated in Latin American countries with the title Carlitos.

=== Cultural success: 1956–1987 ===
On April 9, 1965, Peanuts became the subject of an edition of Time magazine; the characters appeared on the front cover along with the title "The World According To Peanuts", signalling the strip's ascension in American culture. The 1960s are generally considered to be the "golden age" for the strip.

By 1975, Peanuts was in 1,480 newspapers in the US and in 175 abroad.

=== Change of format: 1988–2000 ===
Final Sunday strip, which came out February 13, 2000: a day after the death of Charles M. Schulz

Beginning Leap Day of 1988, the four-panel format for the daily strip was discontinued in favor of a free-form horizontal format that offered Schulz more creative freedom; Schulz began to regularly draw strips with 1–3 panels. Schulz's pen lines during this period began to be rendered frazzled and wobbly due to him developing an essential tremor in his hand, resulting in the graphical style of strips being significantly different than earlier decades. While such a medical condition would normally justify hiring assistant artists, as was normal for other popular newspaper comic strips at the time, Schulz asserted his ideals of craftsmanship by continuing to draw the strip like this.

Schulz announced his retirement on December 14, 1999.

The last daily strip appeared on January 3, 2000, and the last Sunday strip and final strip overall appeared on February 13, 2000. Schulz died in his sleep in his Santa Rosa, California home on February 12, the night before the last strip; commentators have noted the close timing of these two events as unusual. Michaelis surmised, "To the very end, his life had been inseparable from his art. In the moment of ceasing to be a cartoonist, he ceased to be".

== Reception ==
Schulz received the National Cartoonists Society Humor Comic Strip Award for Peanuts in 1962, the Reuben Award in 1955 and 1964 (the first cartoonist to receive the honor twice), the Elzie Segar Award in 1980, and the Milton Caniff Lifetime Achievement Award in 1999. A Charlie Brown Christmas won a Peabody Award and an Emmy; Peanuts cartoon specials have received a total of two Peabody Awards and four Emmys. For his work on the strip, Schulz has a star on the Hollywood Walk of Fame (as does Snoopy) and a place in the William Randolph Hearst Cartoon Hall of Fame. Peanuts was featured on the cover of Time on April 9, 1965, with the accompanying article calling it "the leader of a refreshing new breed that takes an unprecedented interest in the basics of life."

The strip was declared second in a list of the "greatest comics of the 20th century" commissioned by The Comics Journal in 1999. The top-ranked comic was George Herriman's Krazy Kat, a strip Schulz admired (and in fact was among his biggest inspirations), and he accepted the ranking in good grace, to the point of agreeing with it. In 2002 TV Guide declared Snoopy and Charlie Brown tied for 8th in its list of the "Top 50 Greatest Cartoon Characters of All Time", published to commemorate its 50th anniversary.

Schulz was included in the touring exhibition "Masters of American Comics". His work was described as "psychologically complex", and his style as "perfectly in keeping with the style of its times."

Despite the widespread acclaim Peanuts has received, some critics have alleged a decline in quality in the later years of its run, as Schulz frequently digressed from the more cerebral socio-psychological themes that characterized his earlier work in favor of lighter, more whimsical fare. For example, in an essay published in the New York Press at the time of the final daily strip in January 2000, "Against Snoopy", Christopher Caldwell argued that Snoopy, and the strip's increased focus on him in the 1970s, "went from being the strip's besetting artistic weakness to ruining it altogether".

== Legacy ==
=== Among cartoonists ===
Many cartoonists who came after Schulz have cited his work as an influence, including Lynn Johnston, Patrick McDonnell, and Cathy Guisewite, the last of whom stated, "A comic strip like mine would never have existed if Charles Schulz hadn't paved the way".

The December 1997 issue of The Comics Journal featured an extensive collection of testimonials to Peanuts. Over 40 cartoonists, from mainstream newspaper cartoonists to underground, independent comic artists, shared reflections on the power and influence of Schulz's art. Gilbert Hernandez wrote, "Peanuts was and still is for me a revelation. It's mostly from Peanuts where I was inspired to create the village of Palomar in Love and Rockets. Schulz's characters, the humor, the insight ... gush, gush, gush, bow, bow, bow, grovel, grovel, grovel ..." Tom Batiuk wrote: "The influence of Charles Schulz on the craft of cartooning is so pervasive it is almost taken for granted." Batiuk also described the depth of emotion in Peanuts: "Just beneath the cheerful surface were vulnerabilities and anxieties that we all experienced, but were reluctant to acknowledge. By sharing those feelings with us, Schulz showed us a vital aspect of our common humanity, which is, it seems to me, the ultimate goal of great art."

Cartoon tributes have appeared in other comic strips since Schulz died in 2000 and are often displayed at the Charles Schulz Museum in Santa Rosa, California. On May 27, 2000, many cartoonists collaborated to include references to Peanuts in their strips. Originally planned as a tribute to Schulz's retirement, after his death that February, it became a tribute to his life and career. Similarly, on October 30, 2005, several comic strips again included references to Peanuts and specifically the It's the Great Pumpkin, Charlie Brown television special. On November 26, 2022, over 100 cartoonists included references to Peanuts and Charles Schulz in their strips to celebrate his 100th birthday.

=== In broader culture ===
Snoopy has been the personal safety mascot for NASA astronauts since 1968, and NASA issues a Silver Snoopy award to its employees or contractors' employees who promote flight safety. The black-and-white communications cap carrying an audio headset worn since 1968 by the Apollo, Skylab, and Space Shuttle astronauts was commonly referred to as a Snoopy cap.

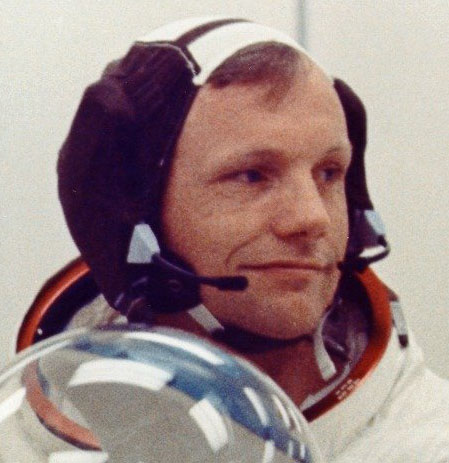
American astronaut Neil Armstrong (1969) wearing the "Snoopy cap"

The lunar and command modules of Apollo 10 had the call signs of Snoopy and Charlie Brown, respectively. While not included in the mission logo, Charlie Brown and Snoopy became semi-official mascots for the mission. Charles Schulz drew an original picture of Charlie Brown in a spacesuit that was hidden aboard the craft to be found by the astronauts once they were in orbit. As of 2026, this drawing is on display at the Kennedy Space Center.

Giant helium balloons of Snoopy, Charlie Brown, and Woodstock have been featured in the annual Macy's Thanksgiving Day Parade in New York City since 1968. This was referred to in a 2008 Super Bowl XLII commercial for Coca-Cola, in which the Charlie Brown balloon snags a Coca-Cola bottle from two battling balloons (Underdog and Stewie Griffin). The Snoopy balloon appeared outside the window of composer Leonard Bernstein's Central Park West apartment in a scene in the film Maestro (2023).

Peanuts on Parade is St. Paul, Minnesota's tribute to Peanuts. It began in 2000, with the placing of 101 five-foot-tall (1.5 m) statues of Snoopy throughout the city of Saint Paul. The statues were later auctioned at the Mall of America in Bloomington, Minnesota. In 2001, there was "Charlie Brown Around Town", 2002 brought "Looking for Lucy", and in 2003, "Linus Blankets Saint Paul". Permanent bronze statues of the Peanuts characters are found in Landmark Plaza in downtown St. Paul.

Peanuts characters and Charles Schulz have been recognized several times in U.S. commemorative postage stamps. A Peanuts World War I Flying Ace U.S. stamp was released on May 17, 2001. The value was 34 cents, first class. A Charlie Brown Christmas forever stamp was issued on October 2, 2015. In 2022, the U.S. Postal Service commemorated the 100th anniversary of Schulz's birth with postage stamps honoring him "alongside his beloved characters".

In 2001, the Sonoma County Board of Supervisors renamed the Sonoma County Airport, located a few miles northwest of Santa Rosa, the Charles M. Schulz Airport in his honor. The airport's logo features Snoopy as the World War I Flying Ace (goggles/scarf), taking to the skies on top of his red doghouse (the Sopwith Camel). A bronze statue of Charlie Brown and Snoopy stands in Depot Park in downtown Santa Rosa.

The name of the Brazilian rock band Charlie Brown Jr., formed in 1992, is named after the character Charlie Brown. The idea came about when Chorão, the band's lead singer, ran over a coconut water stand where there was an image of the character printed on the facade of the establishment.

Robert L. Short interpreted certain themes and conversations in Peanuts as consistent with parts of Christian theology and used them as illustrations in his lectures on the gospel, as explained in his book The Gospel According to Peanuts, the first of several he wrote on religion, Peanuts, and popular culture.

== Books ==
The Peanuts characters have been featured in many books over the years. Some represented chronological reprints of the newspaper strip, while others were thematic collections such as Snoopy's Tennis Book, or collections of inspirational adages such as Happiness Is a Warm Puppy. Some single-story books were produced, such as Snoopy and the Red Baron. In addition, many of the animated television specials and feature films were adapted into book form.

The primary series of reprints was published by Rinehart & Company (later Holt, Rinehart and Winston) beginning in 1952, with the release of a collection simply titled Peanuts. This series, which presented the strips in rough chronological order (albeit with many strips omitted from each year) continued through the 1980s, after which reprint rights were handed off to various other publishers. Ballantine Books published the last original series of Peanuts reprints, including Peanuts 2000, which collected the final year of the strip's run.

Coinciding with these reprints were smaller paperback collections published by Fawcett Publications. Drawing material from the main reprints, this paperback series began with The Wonderful World of Peanuts in 1962 and continued through Lead On, Snoopy in 1992.

Charles Schulz had always resisted republication of the earliest Peanuts strips, as they did not reflect the characters as he eventually developed them. However, in 1997, he began talks with Fantagraphics Books to have the entire run of the strip, which would end up with 17,897 strips in total, published chronologically in book form. In addition to the post-millennium Peanuts publications are BOOM! Studios' restyling of the comics and activity books, and the "First Appearances" series. Its content is produced by Peanuts Studio, subsequently an arm of Peanuts Worldwide LLC.

=== The Complete Peanuts ===
The entire run of Peanuts, covering nearly 50 years of comic strips, was reprinted in Fantagraphics' The Complete Peanuts, a 26-volume set published over 12 years, consisting of two years per volume published every May and October. The first volume (collecting strips from 1950 to 1952) was published in May 2004; the volume containing the final newspaper strips (including all the strips from 1999 and seven strips from 2000, along with the complete run of Li'l Folks) was published in May 2016, with a twenty-sixth volume containing outside-the-daily-strip Peanuts material by Schulz appeared in the fall of that year. A companion series, titled Peanuts Every Sunday and presenting the complete Sunday strips in color (as the main Complete Peanuts books reproduce them in black and white only), was issued in ten volumes published between December 2013 and November 2022.

In addition, almost all Peanuts strips are now also authoritatively available online at GoComics.com (there are some strips missing from the digital archive). Peanuts strips were previously featured on Comics.com.

=== Anniversary books ===
Several books have been released to commemorate key anniversaries of Peanuts:

- 20th (1970) – Charlie Brown & Charlie Schulz — a tie-in with the TV documentary Charlie Brown and Charles Schulz that had aired May 22, 1969
- 25th (1975) – Peanuts Jubilee
- 30th (1980) – Happy Birthday, Charlie Brown
- 30th (1980) – Charlie Brown, Snoopy and Me
- 35th (1985) – You Don't Look 35, Charlie Brown
- 40th (1990) – Charles Schulz: 40 Years of Life & Art
- 45th (1995) – Around the World in 45 Years
- 50th (2000) – Peanuts: A Golden Celebration
- 50th (2000) – 50 Years of Happiness: A Tribute to Charles Schulz
- 60th (2009) – Celebrating Peanuts
- 65th (2015) – Celebrating Peanuts: 65 Years
- 100th Schulz Birthday (2022) – Charles M. Schulz: The Art and Life of the Peanuts Creator in 100 Objects
- 75th (2025) – The Essential Peanuts by Charles M. Schulz: The Greatest Comic Strip of All Time

== Adaptations ==
=== Animation ===
Vince Guaraldi (pictured in 1961 with Bernard Bragg and Don Freeman) provided the music for the first 16 Peanuts television specials and one feature film until his sudden death in February 1976

The strip was first adapted into animation in The Tennessee Ernie Ford Show. A TV documentary, A Boy Named Charlie Brown (1963), featured newly animated segments, but it did not air due to not being able to find a channel willing to broadcast it. It did, however, shape the team for A Charlie Brown Christmas (1965), a half-hour Christmas special broadcast on CBS. It was met with extensive critical success. It was the first of a set of Peanuts television specials (second counting the 1963 documentary), and forms a selection of holiday-themed specials which are aired annually in the US to the present day, including It's the Great Pumpkin, Charlie Brown (1966), and A Charlie Brown Thanksgiving (1973). The animated specials were significant to the cultural impact of Peanuts; by 1972, they were remarked as being "among the most consistently popular television specials" and "regularly have been in the top 10 in the ratings". Many of the specials were acquired by Apple TV+ in 2020. The first feature-length film, A Boy Named Charlie Brown, came in 1969, and was one of four which were produced before the comic strip ended. A Saturday morning television series, The Charlie Brown and Snoopy Show aired in 1983, each episode consisting of three or four segments dealing with plot lines from the strip. An additional spin-off miniseries, This Is America, Charlie Brown, aired in 1988, exploring the history of the United States.

The characters continue to be adapted into animation after the comic strip ended in 2000, with the latest television special Snoopy Presents: A Summer Musical made in 2025. A series of cartoon shorts premiered on iTunes in 2008, Peanuts Motion Comics, which directly lifted themes and plot lines from the strip. In 2014, the French network France 3 debuted Peanuts by Schulz, a series of episodes each consisting of several roughly one-minute shorts bundled together. The latest feature-length film, The Peanuts Movie, was released in 2015 by 20th Century Fox and Blue Sky Studios. Three Peanuts Apple TV+ series, Snoopy in Space, The Snoopy Show, and Camp Snoopy both premiered in 2019, 2021, and 2024, respectively. The characters also make a guest appearance in Mariah Carey's Magical Christmas Special in 2020. On November 6, 2023, a new feature film from WildBrain (the company behind the recent Peanuts content from 2018 until 2025) and Peanuts Worldwide was announced by Apple TV+. Production started in 2024.

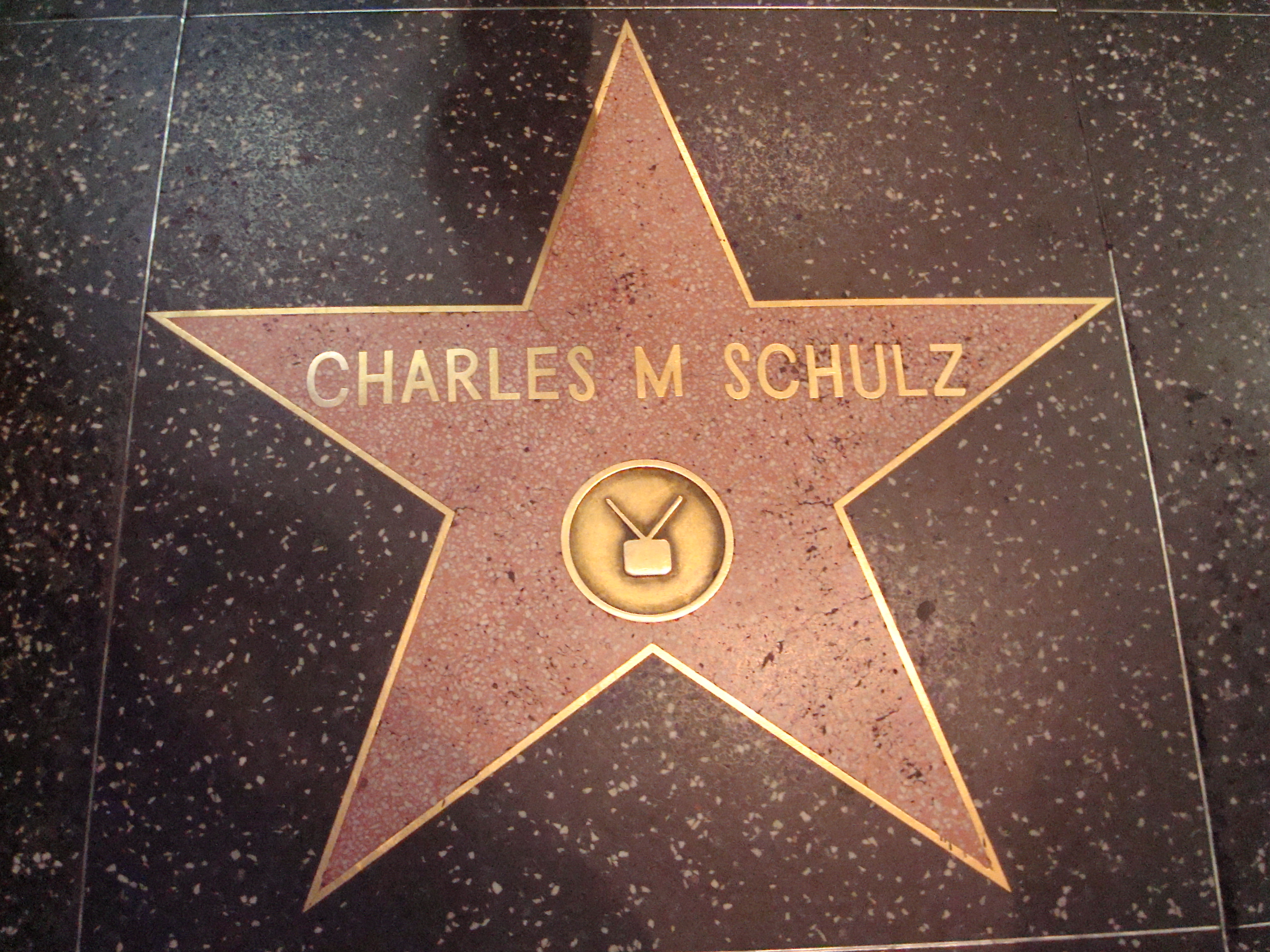
Charles Schulz's Hollywood Walk of Fame star in 2008.

==== Series ====
- Peanuts animated specials (1965–present)
- The Charlie Brown and Snoopy Show (1983–1985)
- This Is America, Charlie Brown (1988–1989)
- Peanuts Motion Comics (2008)
- Peanuts (2014–2016)
- Snoopy in Space (2019–2021)
- The Snoopy Show (2021–2023)
- Camp Snoopy (2024–present)

==== Film ====
- A Boy Named Charlie Brown (1969)
- Snoopy Come Home (1972)
- Race for Your Life, Charlie Brown (1977)
- Bon Voyage, Charlie Brown (and Don't Come Back!!) (1980)
- The Peanuts Movie (2015)
- Snoopy Unleashed (2027)

=== Music ===
The album A Charlie Brown Christmas was recorded in 1965, the original soundtrack from the animated television special of the same name. It was performed by the jazz trio led by pianist Vince Guaraldi. It enjoys enduring critical, commercial, and cultural success; employing a sombre and whimsical style, songs such as Christmas Time Is Here evoke a muted and quiet melody, and arrangements such as the traditional carol O Tannenbaum improvised in a light, off-center pace. The album has continued popularity to the present day; writer Chris Barton for the Los Angeles Times praised it in 2013 as "one of the most beloved holiday albums recorded", and Al Jazeera described it as "one of the most popular Christmas albums of all time". The album was added to the national recording registry of the Library of Congress in 2012, being regarded as "culturally, historically, or aesthetically important".

The American rock band The Royal Guardsmen recorded four novelty songs from 1966 to 1968 as tributes to Snoopy. The first song was released as the single Snoopy Vs. The Red Baron (1966), based on the storyline of Snoopy sitting atop his dog house imagining himself as a World War I pilot, battling the German flying ace The Red Baron. The band would later release two more similar songs in 1967, Return of The Red Baron and Snoopy's Christmas. In 1968 they recorded Snoopy for President.

=== Theater ===
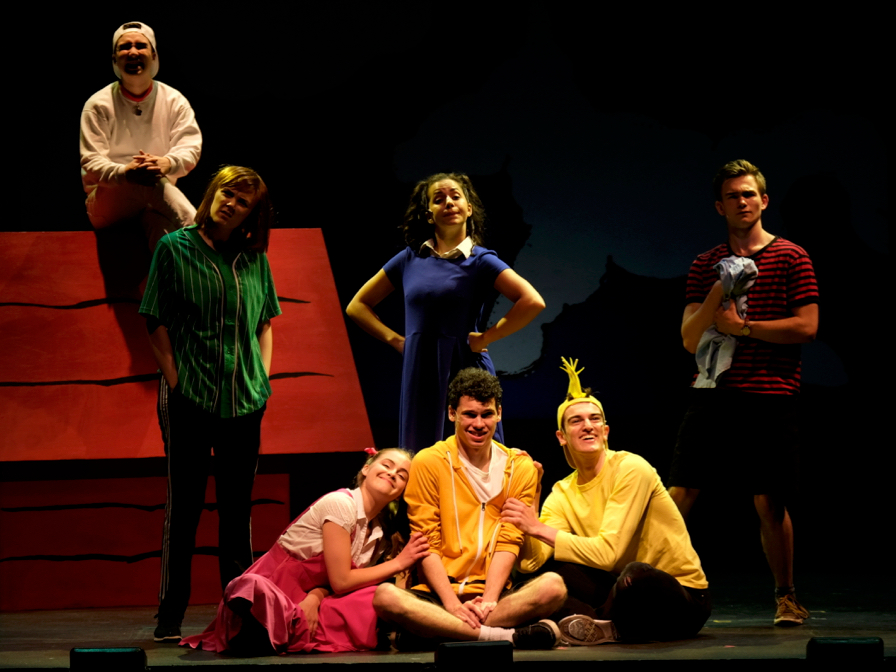
A 2018 performance of Snoopy! The Musical by the Otterbein University theater group

The characters first appeared in live stage production in 1967 with the musical You're a Good Man, Charlie Brown, scored by Clark Gesner. It is a collection of musical sketches, where the characters explore their identities and discover the feelings they have for each other. The play was performed off-broadway, as well as later being performed as a live telecast on NBC. The play continued to have other professional performances, in the London West End, and later a Broadway revival, while also being a popular choice of musical by amateur theater groups such as schools.

A second musical premiered in 1975, Snoopy! The Musical, scored by Larry Grossman with lyrics by Hal Hackady. A sequel to You're a Good Man, Charlie Brown, Snoopy! is also a collection of musical sketches, though focused on Snoopy. It was first performed in San Francisco, and eventually off-Broadway for 152 performances.

You're a Good Man, Charlie Brown and Snoopy!!! The Musical was both further adapted as an animated television special, respectively, in 1985 and in 1988. Going in the opposite direction from animation to live production is the 2016 A Charlie Brown Christmas, based on the 1965 animated television special. It is considered a generally faithful readaptation, although it features the additional characters Woodstock and Peppermint Patty, who did not exist in the strip when the original was made.

== Licensing ==
=== Advertising and retail ===
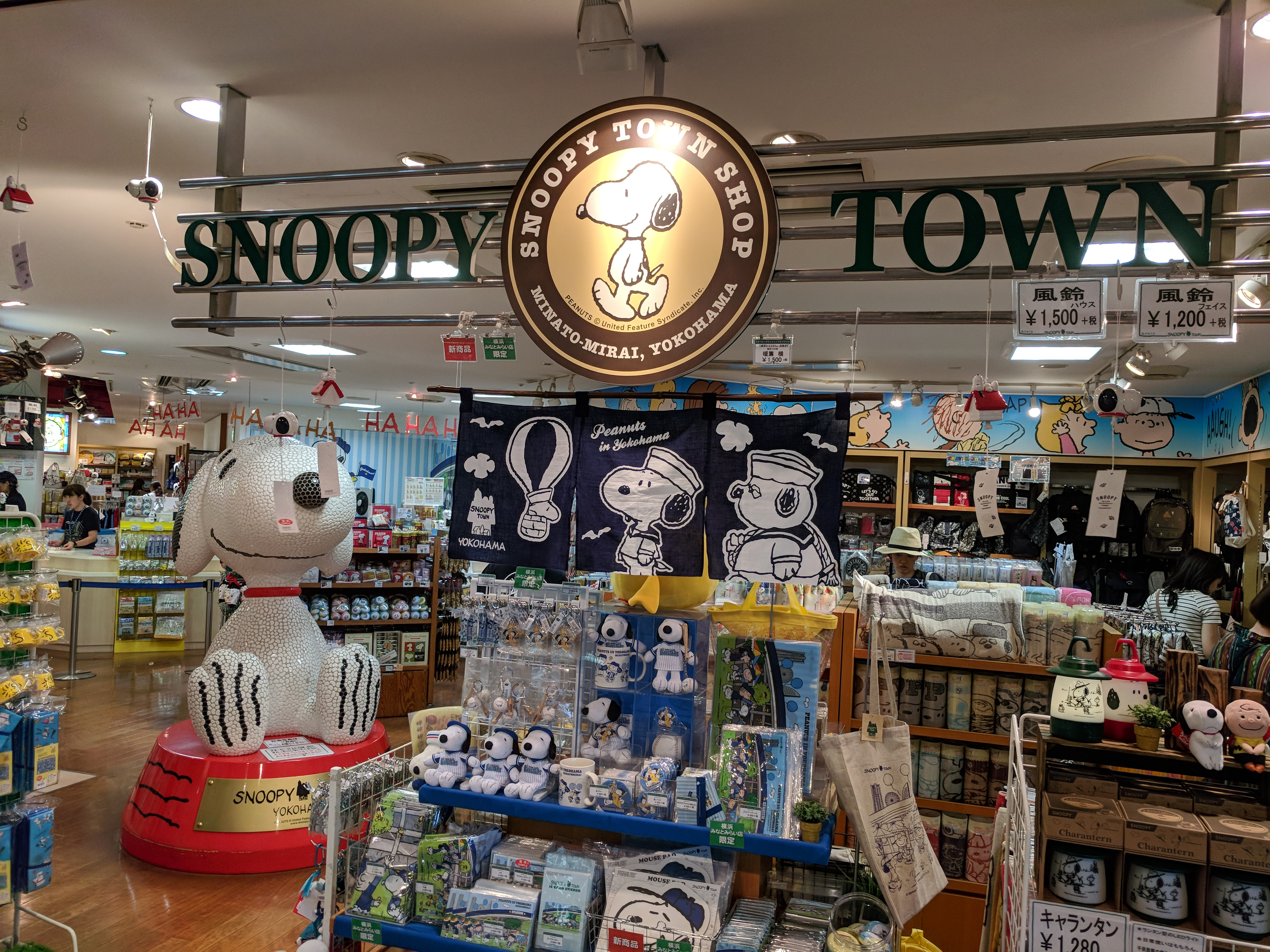
A shop selling Snoopy-related merchandise in Yokohama, Japan (2018). The number of different licensed items is countless.

The characters from the comic have long been licensed for use on merchandise, the success of the comic strip helping to create a market for such items. In 1958, the Hungerford Plastics Corporation created a set of five vinyl dolls of the most famous characters (Charlie Brown, Snoopy, Lucy, Linus, and Schroeder); they expanded this line in 1961 to make the dolls slightly larger and included Sally and Pig-Pen. An early example of the characters appearing in promotional material was strips and illustrations drawn by Schulz for the 1955 instructional booklet for the Kodak Brownie camera, The Brownie Book of Picture Taking. Another early campaign was on behalf of Ford Motor Company; magazine illustrations, brochure illustrations, and animated television spots featuring the characters were used to promote the Ford Falcon from January 1960 into 1964. Schulz credited the Ford campaign as the first time where licensing the characters earned "a lot of money". However, he expressed a dislike of illustrating the adverts, describing it as "hard work" and would have preferred to dedicate equivalent effort to drawing the Sunday format strips.

Some licensing relationships were maintained long-term. Hallmark began printing greeting cards and party goods featuring the characters in 1960. In the late 1960s, Sanrio held the licensing rights in Japan for Snoopy. Sanrio is best known for Hello Kitty and its focus on the kawaii segment of the Japanese market. Beginning in 1985, the characters were made mascots and served as spokespeople for the MetLife insurance company, with the intention to make the business "more friendly and approachable". Schulz justified the licensing relationship with MetLife as necessary to financially support his philanthropic work, although refused to openly describe the exact details of the work he was financing. In 2016, the 31-year licensing relationship with MetLife ended. The relationship resumed in 2023 with Snoopy returning as a mascot for pet insurance.

In 1999, it was estimated that there were 20,000 different new products each year, adorning a variety of licensed items, such as clothing, plush toys of Snoopy, Thermos bottles, lunch boxes, picture frames, and music boxes. The familiarity of the characters also proved lucrative for advertising material in both print and television, appearing on products such as Dolly Madison snack cakes, Chex Mix snacks, Bounty paper towels, Kraft macaroni cheese and A&W Root Beer.

The sheer extent to which the characters are used in licensed material is a subject of criticism against Schulz. Los Angeles Times pointed out that "some critics [say] Schulz was distracted by marketing demands, and his characters had become caricatures of themselves by shilling for Metropolitan Life Insurance, Dolly Madison cupcakes and others." Schulz reasoned that his approach to licensing was in fact modest, stating "our [licensing] program is built upon characters who are figuratively alive" and "we're not simply stamping these characters out on the sides of products just to sell products" while also adding "Snoopy is so versatile he just seems to be able to fit into any role and it just works. It's not that we're out to clutter the market with products. In fact anyone saying we're overdoing it is way off base because actually we are underdoing it".

=== Games ===
The Peanuts characters have appeared in several video games, such as Snoopy in 1984 by Radarsoft, Snoopy: The Cool Computer Game by The Edge, Snoopy and the Red Baron for the Atari 2600, Snoopy's Silly Sports Spectacular (1989, Nintendo Entertainment System), Snoopy's Magic Show (1990, Game Boy), Snoopy Tennis (2001, Game Boy Color), Snoopy Concert which was released in 1995 and sold to the Japanese market for the Super NES, and in October 2006, a second game titled Snoopy vs. The Red Baron by Namco Bandai for the PlayStation 2. In July 2007, the Peanuts characters appeared in the Snoopy the Flying Ace mobile phone game by Namco Networks. In November 2015, Snoopy's Town Tale was launched for mobile by Pixowl, featuring the entire Peanuts gang along with Snoopy and Charlie Brown.

In 1980 (with a new edition published in 1990), the Funk & Wagnalls publishing house also produced a children's encyclopedia called the Charlie Brown's 'Cyclopedia. The 15-volume set features many of the Peanuts characters.

In April 2002, The Peanuts Collectors Edition Monopoly board game was released by USAopoly. The game was created by Justin Gage, a friend of Charles and Jeannie Schulz. Gage dedicated the game to Schulz in memory of his passing.

=== Amusement parks ===
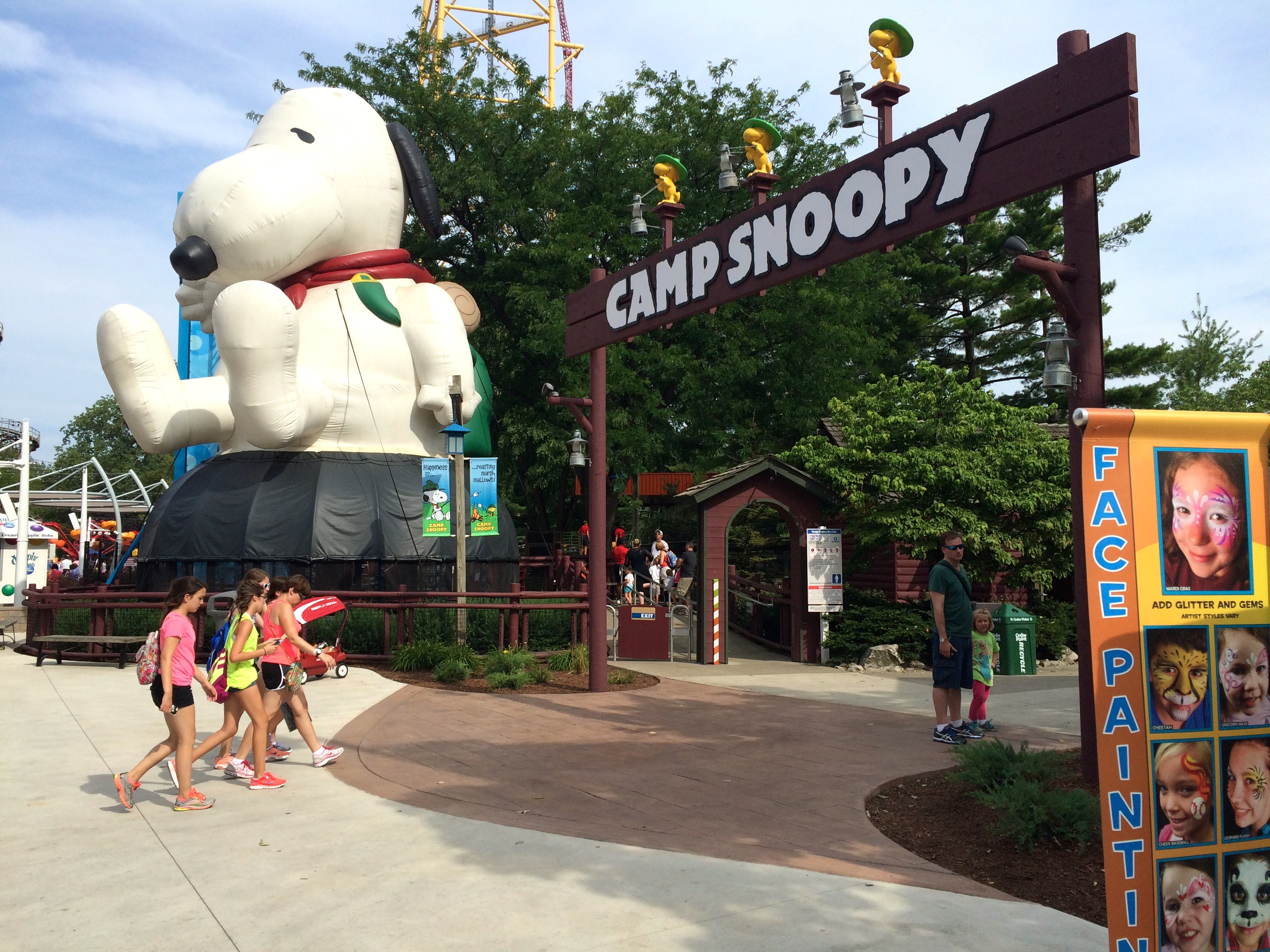
Camp Snoopy, at Cedar Point in 2014

In 1983, Knott's Berry Farm, in Southern California, was the first theme park to license the Peanuts characters, creating the first Camp Snoopy area and making Snoopy the park's mascot. Knott's expanded its operation in 1992 by building an indoor amusement park in the Mall of America, called Knott's Camp Snoopy. The Knott's theme parks were acquired by the national amusement park chain Cedar Fair LP in 1997, which continued to operate Knott's Camp Snoopy park until the mall took over its operation in March 2005. Cedar Fair had already licensed the Peanuts characters for use in 1992 as an atmosphere, so its acquisition of Knott's Berry Farm did not alter the use of those characters. In 2024, Cedar Fair merged with Six Flags, resulting in the latter inheriting the Peanuts characters license.

Snoopy is currently one of the official mascots of the Six Flags parks, primarily in the former Cedar Fair-operated areas. It was previously used in all of the park logos, but it has since been removed. Before 2011, Cedar Fair also operated a Camp Snoopy area at Dorney Park & Wildwater Kingdom, Worlds of Fun, and Valleyfair featuring various Peanuts-themed attractions. There is still a Camp Snoopy area at Cedar Point, Carowinds, Kings Island, Knott's Berry Farm, and Michigan's Adventure.

In 2008, Cedar Point introduced Planet Snoopy, a children's area where Peanuts Playground used to be. This area consists of family and children's rides relocated from Cedar Point's sister park, Geauga Lake, after its closing. The rides are inspired by Peanuts characters. In 2010, the Nickelodeon Central and Nickelodeon Universe areas in the former Paramount Parks (California's Great America, Canada's Wonderland, Carowinds, Kings Dominion, and Kings Island) were replaced by Planet Snoopy. In 2011, Cedar Fair announced it would also add Planet Snoopy to Valleyfair, Dorney Park & Wildwater Kingdom, and Worlds of Fun, replacing the Camp Snoopy areas. ″Carowinds″ Planet Snoopy was rethemed to Camp Snoopy.

Also, the Peanuts characters can be found at Universal Studios Japan in the Universal Wonderland section along with the characters from Sesame Street and Hello Kitty, and in the Snoopy's World in Hong Kong.

=== Exhibition ===
An exhibition in partnership with the Charles M. Schulz Museum titled Good Grief, Charlie Brown! Celebrating Snoopy and the Enduring Power of Peanuts opened at Somerset House in London on 25 October 2018, running until 3 March 2019. The exhibition brought together Charles M. Schulz's original Peanuts cartoons with work from a wide range of acclaimed contemporary artists and designers inspired by the cartoon.

There is a trail called A Dog's Trail Across Cardiff, Caerphilly, and Porthcawl. The trail features Snoopy from Peanuts.

== Ownership ==
Peanuts Holdings LLC
- Type: Subsidiary
- Industry: Entertainment; Licensing
- Founded: June 3, 2010; 16 years ago
- Key people: Tim Erickson (CEO); Ken Ohtake (chairman)
- Owner: Sony (80%) (Note: Via Sony Pictures Entertainment and Sony Music Entertainment Japan.); Charles M. Schulz Creative Associates (20%)
- Parent: Iconix Brand Group (2010–2017); WildBrain (2017–2026)
- Subsidiaries: Peanuts Worldwide LLC
- Website: https://www.snoopy.co.jp/

During his lifetime, Schulz held no ownership stake in his strip but retained royalty and limited licensing rights, with the intellectual property being wholly owned by United Features Syndicate (later United Media). Charles M. Schulz Creative Associates was established by Schulz in 1972 to manage the creative direction and product approvals of Peanuts merchandise in partnership with United Media. Following Schulz's death in 2000, the company remained under the control of his family, who continue to oversee his creative legacy.

On June 3, 2010, United Media sold all its Peanuts-related assets, including its strips and branding, to a new company, Peanuts Holdings LLC, a joint venture of the Iconix Brand Group (which owned 80 percent) and Charles M. Schulz Creative Associates (20 percent). On the same day Iconix established the subsidiary Peanuts Worldwide LLC to manage the Peanuts brand. In addition, United Media sold its United Media Licensing arm, which represents licensing for its other properties, to Peanuts Worldwide. United Feature Syndicate continued to syndicate the strip until February 27, 2011, when Universal Uclick took over syndication, ending United Media's 60-plus-year stewardship of Peanuts.

In May 2017, Canada-based DHX Media (now WildBrain) announced that it would acquire Iconix's entertainment brands, including the 80% stake of Peanuts Worldwide and full rights to the Strawberry Shortcake brand, for $345 million. DHX officially took control of the properties on June 30, 2017.

On May 13, 2018, DHX announced that it had reached a strategic agreement in which Sony Music Entertainment Japan (whose consumer products division has been a licensing agent for the Peanuts brand since 2010) would acquire 49% of its 80% stake in Peanuts Worldwide for $185 million, with DHX holding a 41% stake and SMEJ owning 39%. The transaction was completed on July 23. Two months after the sale's completion, DHX eliminated the rest of its debt by signing a five-year, multi-million-dollar agency agreement with CAA-GBG Global Brand Management Group (a brand management joint venture between Creative Artists Agency and Hong Kong-based Global Brands Group) to represent the Peanuts brand in China and the rest of Asia excluding Japan.

On December 19, 2025, Sony Pictures Entertainment and SMEJ announced that they would jointly acquire WildBrain's stake in the Peanuts brand, Peanuts Worldwide, and its parent company, Peanuts Holdings, LLC, for $457 million. Sony increased its stake to 80%, as part of the process of acquiring the previous 41% stake held by WildBrain, which is shared between SPE and SMEJ. The sale resolved WildBrain's lingering debt issues tied to its domestic Canadian market and allowed it to focus on its other major franchises. As part of the deal, WildBrain will continue to produce the Snoopy Presents specials, future television series and the upcoming Peanuts film for Apple TV, and WildBrain CPLG continues to serve as its licensing agent for consumer products in the EMEA and Asia-Pacific markets (excluding Australia, New Zealand, and Japan). The acquisition was completed on March 3, 2026.

Sony's majority ownership directly intersects with the franchise's location-based entertainment footprint in Japan, where Sony Creative Products Inc. (SCP), a wholly owned subsidiary of SMEJ, serves as the primary local licensing agent. SCP launched and operates the Snoopy Museum Tokyo, which originally opened in Roppongi as a temporary venue in April 2016 before permanently relocating to Machida, Tokyo, in December 2019. Operating with direct involvement from both Sony and Charles M. Schulz Creative Associates, the venue serves as the world's only official international satellite branch of the California-based Charles M. Schulz Museum and Research Center.
