= List of Cleveland Guardians no-hitters =

The Cleveland Guardians are a Major League Baseball franchise based in Cleveland, Ohio. They play in the American League Central division. Also known as the Cleveland Blues (1901), Cleveland Broncos (1902), Cleveland Naps (1903–1914), and Cleveland Indians (1915–2022), pitchers for the Guardians have thrown 14 no-hitters in franchise history. A no-hitter is officially recognized by Major League Baseball only "when a pitcher (or pitchers) allows no hits during the entire course of a game, which consists of at least nine innings. In a no-hit game, a batter may reach base via a walk, an error, a hit by pitch, a passed ball or wild pitch on strike three, or catcher's interference." No-hitters of less than nine complete innings were previously recognized by the league as official; however, several rule alterations in 1991 changed the rule to its current form. No-hitters are rare, but every team in Major League Baseball has had a pitcher accomplish the feat.^{[a]} Two perfect games, a special subcategory of no-hitter, have been thrown in Guardians history. As defined by Major League Baseball, "in a perfect game, no batter reaches any base during the course of the game." These feats were achieved by Addie Joss on October 2, 1908 and by Len Barker on May 15, 1981.

Bob Rhoads threw the first no-hitter in Guardians history on September 18, 1908; the most recent no-hitter was thrown by Barker on May 15, 1981. No left-handed pitchers have thrown no-hitters in franchise history while all were by right-handers. Nine no-hitters were thrown at home and five on the road. They threw four in April, two in May, two in June, three in July, two in September, and one in October. The longest interval between no-hitters in franchise history was between the games pitched by Barker and incumbent pitcher, encompassing over 39 years from May 15, 1981 till present. Conversely, the shortest interval between no-hitters was between the games pitched by Rhoads and Joss, encompassing merely 14 days from September 18, 1908 till October 2, 1908. They no-hit the Chicago White Sox the most, which occurred thrice, which were no-hit by Joss (in 1908 and 1910) and Bob Feller (in 1940). There is one no-hitter which the team allowed at least a run, which was done by Rhoads in 1908. The most baserunners allowed in a no-hitter were by Feller (in 1940) and Don Black (in 1947), who each allowed six. Of the 14 no-hitters, five have been won by a score of 1–0, more common than any other results. The largest margin of victory in a no-hitter was a 9–0 win by Wes Ferrell in 1931. The smallest margin of victory was a 1–0 wins by Joss in 1908 and 1910, Feller in 1940 and 1946, and Dennis Eckersley in 1977; and 2–1 win by Rhoads in 1908.

The umpire is also an integral part of any no-hitter. The task of the umpire in a baseball game is to make any decision "which involves judgment, such as, but not limited to, whether a batted Ball is fair or foul, whether a pitch is a strike or a Ball, or whether a runner is safe or out… [the umpire's judgment on such matters] is final." Part of the duties of the umpire making calls at home plate includes defining the strike zone, which "is defined as that area over homeplate (sic) the upper limit of which is a horizontal line at the midpoint between the top of the shoulders and the top of the uniform pants, and the lower level is a line at the hollow beneath the kneecap." These calls define every baseball game and are therefore integral to the completion of any no-hitter. 11 different umpires presided over each of the franchise's 14 no-hitters.

The manager is another integral part of any no-hitter. The tasks of the manager is to determine the starting rotation as well as batting order and defensive lineup every game. Managers choosing the right pitcher and right defensive lineup at a right game at a right place at a right time would lead to a no-hitter. 11 different managers have led to the franchise's 14 no-hitters.

== List of no-hitters in Guardians history ==
¶	Indicates a perfect game
£	Pitcher was left-handed
*	Member of the National Baseball Hall of Fame and Museum

#	Date	Pitcher	Final score	Base- runners	Opponent	Catcher	Plate umpire	Manager	Notes	Ref
(1) (disputed)	June 30, 1901	Pete Dowling	7–0	5	@ Milwaukee Brewers	George Yeager	Joe Cantillon	Jimmy McAleer	Not recognized by Major League Baseball; Sources disagree on whether a ball hit by Milwaukee's Wid Conroy in the 7th inning was a hit, or an error by Cleveland third baseman Bill Bradley	
1	September 18, 1908	Bob Rhoads	2–1	2	Boston Red Sox	Harry Bemis	Tommy Connolly (1)	Nap Lajoie (1)	First no-hitter at home in franchise history; First right-handed pitcher to throw a no-hitter in franchise history; Smallest margin of victory in a franchise's no-hitter (tie)	
2	October 2, 1908	Addie Joss* (1)	1–0	0	Chicago White Sox	Nig Clarke	Tommy Connolly (2)	Nap Lajoie (2)	Smallest margin of victory in a franchise's no-hitter (tie); First perfect game in Guardians history and 4th in MLB history; Shortest interval between franchise's no-hitters; Latest calendar date of franchise's no-hitter	
3	April 20, 1910	Addie Joss* (2)	1–0	2	@ Chicago White Sox	Steve O'Neill	Bull Perrine	Deacon McGuire	Smallest margin of victory in a franchise's no-hitter (tie); First franchise's no-hitter on the road; Joss was the first pitcher to no-hit the same team twice, since then, Tim Lincecum and Justin Verlander have matched the feat by no-hitting the San Diego Padres and Toronto Blue Jays twice	
4	September 10, 1919	Ray Caldwell	3–0	2	@ New York Yankees	Steve O'Neill	Billy Evans	Tris Speaker	First game of a doubleheader	
5	April 29, 1931	Wes Ferrell	9–0	5	St. Louis Browns	Luke Sewell	Harry Geisel (1)	Roger Peckinpaugh	Ferrell also hit HR; Largest margin of victory in a franchise's no-hitter	
6	April 16, 1940	Bob Feller* (1)	1–0	6	@ Chicago White Sox	Rollie Hemsley	Harry Geisel (2)	Ossie Vitt	Smallest margin of victory in a franchise's no-hitter (tie); Only no-hitter on Opening Day; Earliest calendar date of franchise's no-hitter; Most baserunners allowed in a franchise's no-hitter (tie)	
7	April 30, 1946	Bob Feller* (2)	1–0	5	@ New York Yankees	Frankie Hayes	Eddie Rommel (1)	Lou Boudreau (1)	Smallest margin of victory in a franchise's no-hitter (tie)	
8	July 10, 1947	Don Black	3–0	6	Philadelphia Athletics	Jim Hegan (1)	Eddie Rommel (2)	Lou Boudreau (2)	First game of a doubleheader; Most baserunners allowed in a franchise's no-hitter (tie)	
9	June 30, 1948	Bob Lemon*	2–0	3	@ Detroit Tigers	Jim Hegan (2)	Cal Hubbard	Lou Boudreau (3)	Shortest interval between franchise's no-hitters	
10	July 1, 1951	Bob Feller* (3)	2–1	5	Detroit Tigers	Jim Hegan (3)	Charlie Berry	Al Lopez	First game of a doubleheader	
11	June 10, 1966	Sonny Siebert	2–0	2	Washington Senators	Joe Azcue	Jim Honochick	Birdie Tebbetts	Game was televised on ABC	
12	July 19, 1974	Dick Bosman	4–0	1	Oakland Athletics	John Ellis	Hank Morgenweck	Ken Aspromonte	Bosman's own fielding error with 2 outs in the 4th allowed Oakland's only baserunner (Sal Bando); The A's went on to win the 1974 World Series—their third consecutive World Championship and second straight after being no-hit during the season	
13	May 30, 1977	Dennis Eckersley*	1–0	2	California Angels	Ray Fosse	Bill Deegan	Frank Robinson	Memorial Day; Smallest margin of victory in a franchise's no-hitter (tie)	
14	May 15, 1981	Len Barker	3–0	0	Toronto Blue Jays	Ron Hassey	Rich Garcia	Dave Garcia	Second perfect game in Indians history and 10th in MLB history; Most recent no-hitter in franchise history	

== See also ==
- List of Major League Baseball no-hitters
