= Kate M. Foley =

American librarian and advocate for blind literacy (1873–1940)

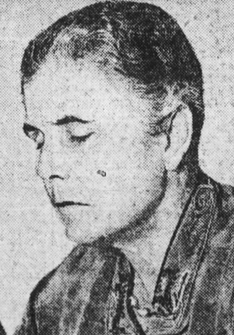
- Kate M. Foley, from a 1928 newspaper photograph.
- Born: Catherine M. Foley; May 26, 1873; East St. Louis, Illinois
- Died: October 7, 1940 (aged 67); Los Angeles, California
- Occupation: librarian
- Known for: California Library Hall of Fame (2015)
- Notable work: Five Lectures on Blindness (1919)

Kate M. Foley (May 26, 1873 – October 7, 1940) was an American librarian and advocate for blind literacy, based in San Francisco, California.

== Early life ==
Catherine M. Foley was born in East St. Louis, Illinois, the daughter of James Foley and Bridget E. Dunn Foley. Her parents were both immigrants from Ireland. She was blind from infancy, from ophthalmia neonatorum. "I was in my sixth year before I understood the meaning of the word blind. Up to that time, I had romped and played with other children, climbed trees, jumped ditches, accepting bumps and bruises as part of the game, and having no sense of fear, since some child always held my hand." She attended the California Institute for the Deaf and Dumb and Blind, graduating in 1895.

== Career ==
Foley began working for the California State Library in 1914, in the Books for the Blind department, as Home Teacher of the Blind. She started a public school class for blind children in Los Angeles in 1917, and taught a class of men at the Industrial Home for the Adult Blind in Oakland, California. "The pupils have confidence in a blind teacher," she explained, "because they know that every step in their difficult path is familiar to her feet." She also trained educators to work with blind students, trained clubwomen to copy texts into Braille, and worked with blind prisoners at San Quentin. She published Five Lectures on Blindness in 1919, based on lectures she gave at the University of California in 1918. In the 1920s she gave radio talks for blind listeners, and promoted radio as a medium for blind education. She also promoted an early prototype of a "talking book" machine.

She was second vice-president of the American Association of Workers for the Blind, and chaired the American Braille Commission. She was a frequent speaker before civic groups and conferences, including the 1931 World Conference on Work for the Blind in New York.

== Personal life ==
On October 7, 1940, Foley died at her brother's home in Los Angeles, California. Foley was 67 years old. In 2015, she was inducted into the California Library Hall of Fame.
