= Meredith Hodges =

American equine trainer, competitor, educator, author and TV personality

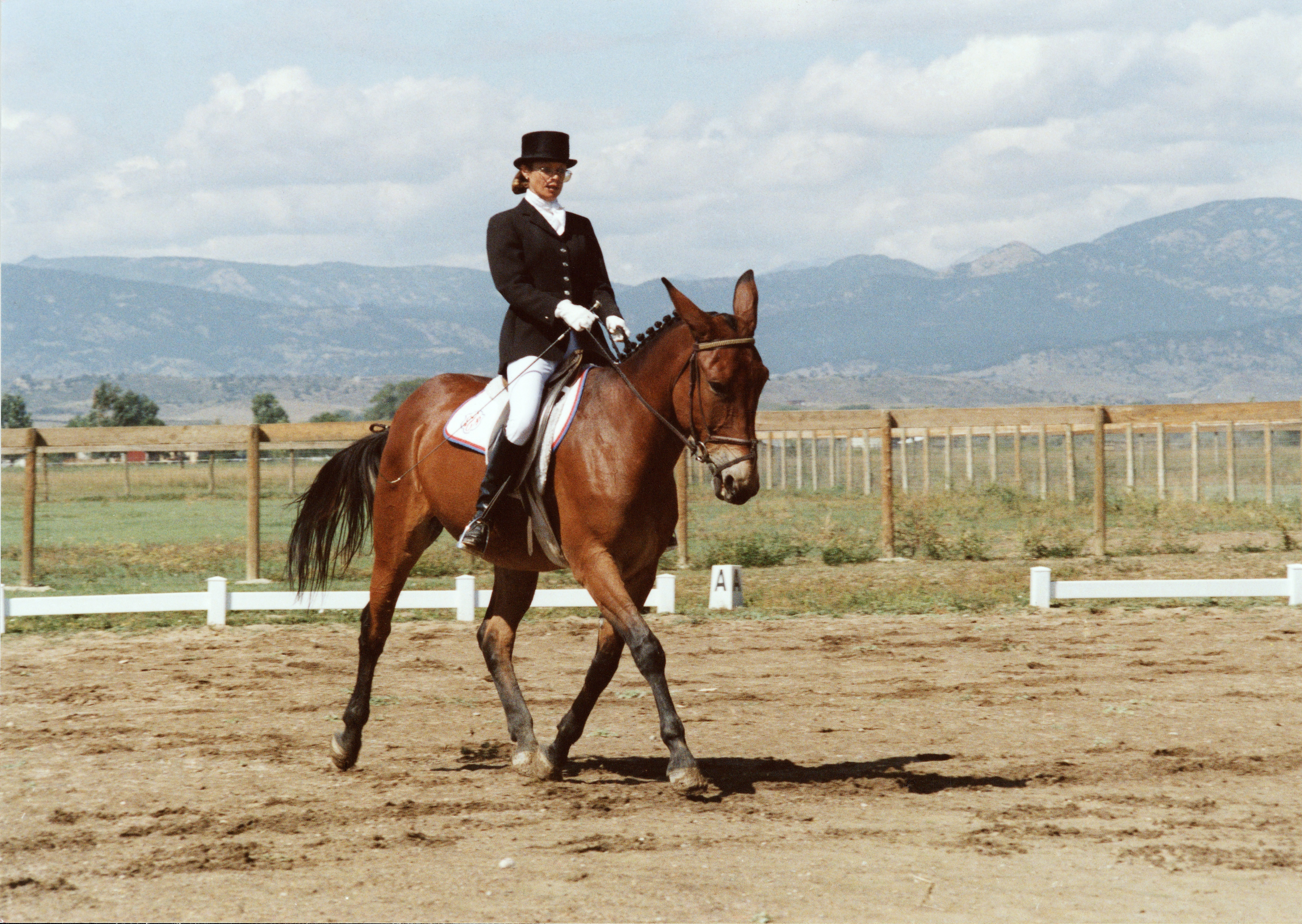
- Meredith Hodges doing dressage with Champion Mule, Lucky Three Sundowner
- Born: Meredith Sue Lewis; February 5, 1950 (age 76); Minneapolis, Minnesota, U.S.
- Other name: Meredith Schulz
- Education: The American School in Switzerland
- Alma mater: Sonoma State University
- Occupations: equine trainer, equestrian competitor, author, TV personality, horse and mule advocate
- Known for: Work with saddle mules and donkeys
- Spouses: Gary Fredricksen (m. 1969; died 1975) Gary Hodges (m. 1980–1982)
- Children: 1
- Parent: Charles M. Schulz (stepfather)

Meredith Sue Hodges (née Schulz; born February 5, 1950) is an American equine trainer, competitor, educator, author and TV personality specializing in mules and donkeys, specifically the contemporary saddle mule.

== Early life ==
Hodges's parents are Newton William Lewis and Joyce Steele Doty (née Halverson, formerly Lewis), mule breeder and developer of the first "quality" mules in the United States. In 1951, her mother, having divorced Lewis, married cartoonist and Peanuts creator Charles M. Schulz, who adopted Hodges. Hodges grew up as one of Schulz's five children, and did not learn until she was an adult that he was not her biological father. Hodges was born in Minneapolis, Minnesota, after which her family moved to Colorado Springs, Colorado where her younger brother was born. The family eventually moved to Sebastopol, California. After graduating from The American School In Switzerland, Hodges attended Sonoma State University, where she studied psychiatric nursing. During this time she began work at Sonoma State Hospital with a rotation at Napa State Hospital as a psychiatric technician. Her career choice seemed far removed from where life would take her in the future, but, today, Hodges attributes her studies in psychology—especially her work in behavior modification science—to be at the core of her understanding of and her ability to communicate with mules and donkeys. In 1973 her mother enlisted her help in tending to the many mules and donkeys on her Windy Valley Mule Ranch in Healdsburg, California. Hodges became an assistant trainer and worked with her mother, on and off, until 1979, when her mother sold the Windy Valley Ranch. Joyce Doty gave Hodges the last mule, Lucky Three Sundowner, and the last jack, Little Jack Horner, that were born at Windy Valley Ranch in 1980. Little Jack Horner became the Sire Supreme of the Lucky Three Ranch lineage in Colorado.

== Career ==
Meredith Hodges jumping with champion jack donkey, Little Jack Horner

In 1980 Hodges purchased a 10-acre (40,000 m^{2}) former sheep ranch in Loveland, Colorado and christened it the Lucky Three Ranch. She began breeding and training what would become a top-quality line of mules and donkeys, some of them future champions. Her purpose was to prove that mules could do everything that horses could do in all kinds of recreational equestrian disciplines to further their use in modern America. As she learned more about these equines’ personalities and abilities, she began to develop her own training program utilizing her own observations and her background in behavior modification. Over the next ten years, guided by the resistance-free training techniques of Richard Shrake and merging the knowledge of many other trainers from multiple equestrian disciplines (such as Major Anders Lindgren in dressage, Rick Noffsinger in driving, Bruce Davidson and Denny Emerson in Combined Training, Al Dunning in reining), she coalesced her theories and techniques into a comprehensive method called “Training Mules and Donkeys: A Logical Approach To Longears.”

Concurrently, Hodges’ evolving technique proved successful in showing her animals in both horse and mule shows. In 1984 Lucky Three Sundowner became the World Champion Bridle Reined Mule at Bishop Mule Days in Bishop, California. He then became the World Champion 3rd level Dressage Mule in 1992, and again in 1993, while working at home at 4th Level Dressage.

During the 1970s and early 1980s, most competitive equestrian events were closed to mules and donkeys. In 1986 Hodges lobbied at the United States Dressage Federation (USDF) Convention, wrote letter campaigns, and held forums and discussions with various breed organizations in an effort to change the USDF rules to include mules and donkeys in competition. This was done, but the American Horse Show Association (AHSA) still would not accept them. Mules were limited to schooling shows only and not allowed at the upper levels in the USDF shows that were governed by the AHSA. Hodges continued to work with other mule enthusiasts to get mules accepted by the AHSA. On January 18, 2004, mules were finally accepted by the AHSA, now the United States Equestrian Federation (USEF). The rule was approved with consideration. Mules were now accepted in the Dressage Division of the USEF.

In 1990 her champion jack donkey, Little Jack Horner, jumped four feet in exhibition at Bishop Mule Days, winning a Special Award and making him the only formal jumping donkey in the world. In 2024, she hired Daniel Parker, on a $950,000 contract, to produce a life-size bronze sculpture of a mule pack train.

== Animal welfare and advocacy ==
Since 1999, Hodges has financially supported Colorado’s Hearts & Horses, a NARHA-approved therapeutic riding program, and donated two mules to help develop and expand this program. As an equine rights advocate, Hodges supports and promotes a variety of horse and mule rescue organizations. She is also involved in the efforts to end horse slaughter and the consumption of horsemeat overseas, and the call for ethical and humane treatment and management of the wild horses and burros being overseen by the United States BLM (Bureau of Land Management).

== Personal life ==
She married Gary Fredricksen in 1969. Meredith and Gary Fredricksen started managing the Sonoma Craft Magic Leather Shop making unique, original design leather clothes from 1970 up until 1975. During this time she worked a series of other jobs as a waitress and a skating instructor for the Redwood Empire Ice Arena in Santa Rosa. Her daughter, Dena was born in 1974. Gary Fredricksen drowned in a swimming accident in Bear River in Grass Valley, California in 1975 and shortly after Meredith went to the Windy Valley Ranch to work with her mother's equines. She married Gary Hodges in 1980, the same year she purchased the property that would become the Lucky Three Ranch. Meredith and Gary Hodges divorced in 1982. She has two brothers, Monte and Craig, and two sisters, Amy and Jill.

== Career highlights ==
- 1986 – Established the Colorado Mule & Donkey Society
- 1986 – Gave a presentation entitled “Mules in Dressage” to the United States Dressage Federation in Houston, Texas, Mules were accepted nationally at non-AHSA shows and competitions.
- 1988 – Three of her mules marched in the Tournament of Roses Parade in Pasadena, CA.
- 1991 - Lucky Three Ciji was International Side Saddle Organization All Around Champion.
- 1991 – Rode Little Jack Horner to jump over four feet in exhibition at Bishop Mule Days.
- 1992,1993– Rode Lucky Three Sundowner to two world championships at third-level dressage.
- 1992 - Lucky Three Ciji was Reserve International Side Saddle Organization All Around Champion.
- 1992 – Mae Bea C.T. took second place at the Abbe Ranch Horse Trials.
- 1993 – Mae Bea C.T. took first place in the Novice division at the Abbe Ranch Horse Trials.
- 1993 – Rode Mae Bea C.T. in the presidential inaugural parade, Washington, D.C.
- 1998 – Lucky Three Eclipse was Bishop World Champion Warm-up Hunter.
- 2002–2009 - Her mule and donkey training program, “Training Mules & Donkeys,” aired on RFD-TV.

== Bibliography and DVDs ==
=== Books ===
- Training Mules and Donkeys: A Logical Approach to Longears, Alpine Publications, 1993, ISBN 0-931866-58-8
- Training Without Resistance from Foal to Advanced Levels (also available in Spanish, French and German), 1999, ISBN 1-928624-01-4
- Equine Management & Donkey Training (also available in Spanish, French and German), 1999, ISBN 1-928624-16-2
- Donkey Training, 1999, ISBN 1-928624-02-2
- A Guide to Raising & Showing Mules, 2003, ISBN 0-9702309-9-0
- Equus Revisited: A Complete Approach to Athletic Conditioning, 2009, ISBN 1-928624-44-8
- Jasper: The Story of a Mule, 2003, ISBN 0-9702309-8-2
- Jasper: A Christmas Caper, 2004, ISBN 1-928624-20-0
- Jasper: A Precious Valentine, 2005, ISBN 1-928624-23-5
- Jasper: A Fabulous Fourth, 2006, ISBN 1-928624-24-3
- Jasper: A Turkey Tale, 2007, ISBN 1-928624-42-1
- Jasper Goes to Bishop Coloring Book, 2009, ISBN 978-1-928624-45-5
- Jasper: An April Mule's Day, 2019, ISBN 978-1-928624-47-9

=== DVDs ===
- Training Mules and Donkeys Series:
1. Foal Training, 1997, ISBN 1-928624-03-0
2. Preparing for Performance: Groundwork, 1997, ISBN 1-928624-04-9
3. Preparing for Performance: Driving, 1997, ISBN 1-928624-05-7
4. Basic Foundation for Saddle, 1997, ISBN 1-928624-06-5
5. Intermediate Saddle Training, 1997 ISBN 1-928624-07-3
6. Advanced Saddle Training, 1997, ISBN 1-928624-08-1
7. Jumping, 1997, ISBN 1-928624-09-X
8. Management, Fitting & Grooming, 1998, ISBN 1-928624-10-3
9. Keys to Training the Donkey: Intro to the Donkey & Basic Training, 1999, ISBN 1-928624-11-1
10. Keys to Training the Donkey: Saddle Training & Jumping, 1999, ISBN 1-928624-12-X
- Those Magnificent Mules Series:
1. Those Magnificent Mules, The Story of Lucky Three Ranch & The Road to Bishop, Parts 1-4, 2008, ISBN 1-928624-36-7
2. Those Magnificent Mules, Walk On: Exploring Therapeutic Riding, Parts 5&6, 2008, ISBN 1-928624-37-5
3. Those Magnificent Mules, Bishop All-Stars & The Bishop Experience, Parts 7-10, 2009, ISBN 1-928624-38-3
4. Equus Revisited: A Complete Approach to Athletic Conditioning, 2009, ASIN 1928624472
5. Rock and Roll: Diary of a Rescue, 2020, ISBN 978-1-928624-48-6, ASIN 1928624480
- Jasper the Mule Series:
1. Jasper: The Story of a Mule, 2005, ISBN 1-928624-22-7
2. Jasper Goes to Bishop, 2009, ASIN 1928624464
3. Jasper: A Christmas Caper, 2010, ASIN 1928624391
4. Jasper: A Precious Valentine, 2011, ASIN 1928624405
5. Jasper: A Turkey Tale, 2011, ASIN 1928624421
6. Creating the Jasper Carousel, 2021, ISBN 978-1-928624-49-3

== Sources ==
- Meredith Hodges at IMDb
- Hertz, H. (2001). "Meredith Hodges", Western Horseman 66
- (1987). "Mules Make the Grade", Equus
- Voynick, S. (2006)."For the Love of Longears" Acres Innovative Country Living 14
- (Aug. 2010). USDF Connection Magazine
- Hertz, H. (2010) "An Event Like No Other", Western Horseman
- Davis S. (1993). "Long Ears in High Society", Sports Illustrated
- Noel T.J. & Faulkner, D.B. (2006).Colorado An Illustrated History of the Highest State American Historical Press
- Nickell, G. (2003). "Meredith Hodges authors children’s book", Inyo Register
- Voynick, S. (2006) "A Place for Mules", Persimmon Hill 64
- Gordon, J. (2003) "Telling a mule’s tale", Fort Collins Coloradoan
- Hertz. H. (2007). "A Special Mule Memorialized in Bronze", Horses in Art 32
- CBLM Staff (2005). "Mule Expert Focuses on Educating Children", Colorado Business & Lifestyle Magazine 4
- (2003). "Mule It Over", Cowboys & Indians
- Schulz, C.M. (1975). ‘’Peanuts Jubilee’’, Holt, Rinehart and Wilson
- Noel T.J. with Sladek, R.D. (2002). Fort Collins and Larimer County An Illustrated History, Heritage Media Corp.
- Peyre-Ferry, M. (1990), "Sport Mules Leaving the Plows Behind", HorsePlay
- Mule Days Celebration, Bishop, California
- Bishop Mule Days show records
- (2004)."Hodges comes by her love of mules naturally", Journal-Advocate, Sterling, Colorado
- Mischka, R.A. (1994).Let’s Show Your Mule, Heart Prairie Press
- Lackett, K. (2006) "Rialto to screen 'Jasper,' and animated short" Fort Collins Coloradoan
- (2007). "Hearts & Horses gala a big success", Fort Collins Coloradoan
- Lee/Embry/Hutter/Pollok/Rudd/Westrom/Bull (1996). Introduction to Livestock and Poultry Production, Interstate Publishers Inc.
- Travis, L. (1990). The Mule, J.A. Allen & Co., Ltd.
- Orlean, S. (2010). "Riding High Mules in the Military", The New Yorker
- Hertz, H. (2009). "Heartwarming Tale Holds Key to Training Success", Mules and More Magazine
