= California School for the Blind =

School in Fremont, California, US

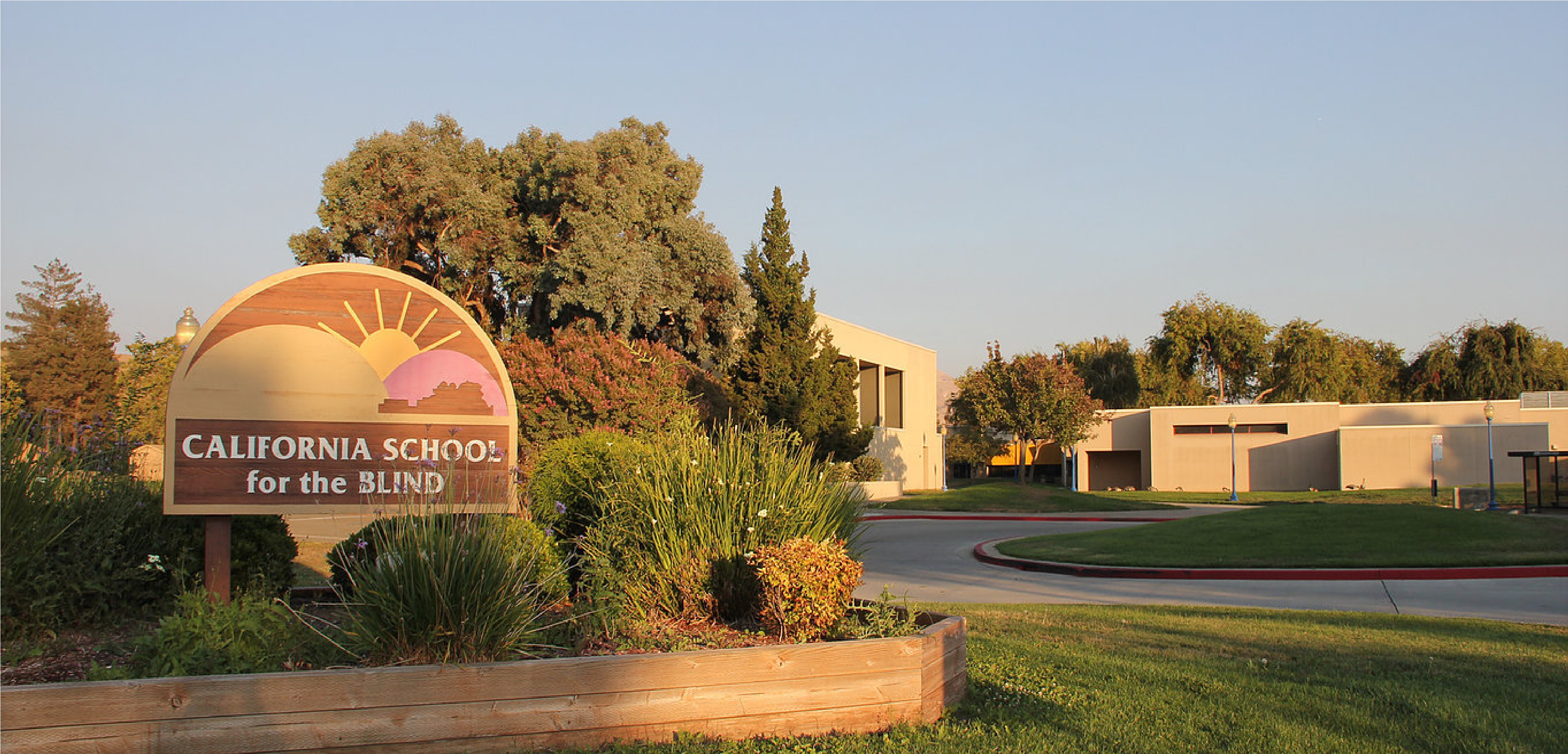
- Photo of the main entrance to the California School for the Blind from Walnut Avenue, facing the school. The sign at the main entrance is shown with the theater and several other buildings in the background.

Location
- 500 Walnut Avenue; Fremont, CA 94536; United States; 37°33′41″N 121°57′54″W

Information
- Established: 1860
- Superintendent: Dr. Gina E. Ouellette
- Faculty: 44
- Grades: ages 3 to 21
- Enrollment: 82
- Campus size: 25 acres (100,000 m^{2})
- Colors: Burgundy and Silver
- Mascot: Cheetah
- Website: www.csb-cde.ca.gov

The California School for the Blind is a public educational institution for blind children, K-12, located in Fremont, California. Its campus is located next to the California School for the Deaf.

== History ==
The San Francisco area's education of blind children began in 1860 with the organization of the privately supported Society for the Instruction and Maintenance of the Indigent Deaf and Dumb, and the Blind in California by Frances Augusta Clark. She served as the first principal of the school until 1865, when Dr. Warring Wilkinson was brought to the school. Dr. Wilkinson is credited with beginning the efforts to make the school wholly state-supported and seeing the school, then known as the California State Asylum for the Deaf, Dumb and Blind through its move to what would later become Berkeley in 1867.

=== Berkeley (1867–1980) ===
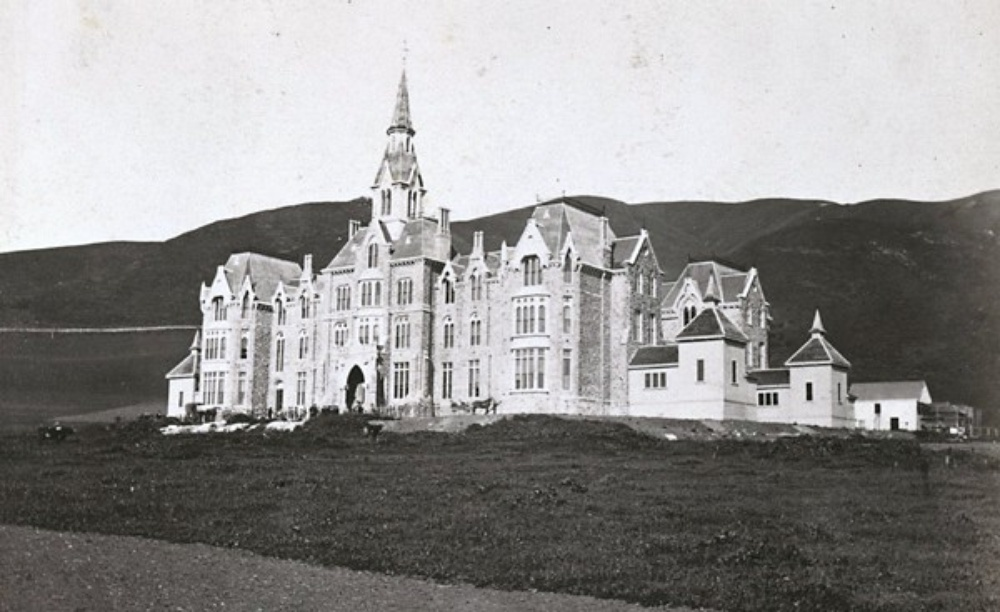
Deaf, Dumb and Blind Asylum (ca. 1860/1870), that was destroyed by fire in 1875

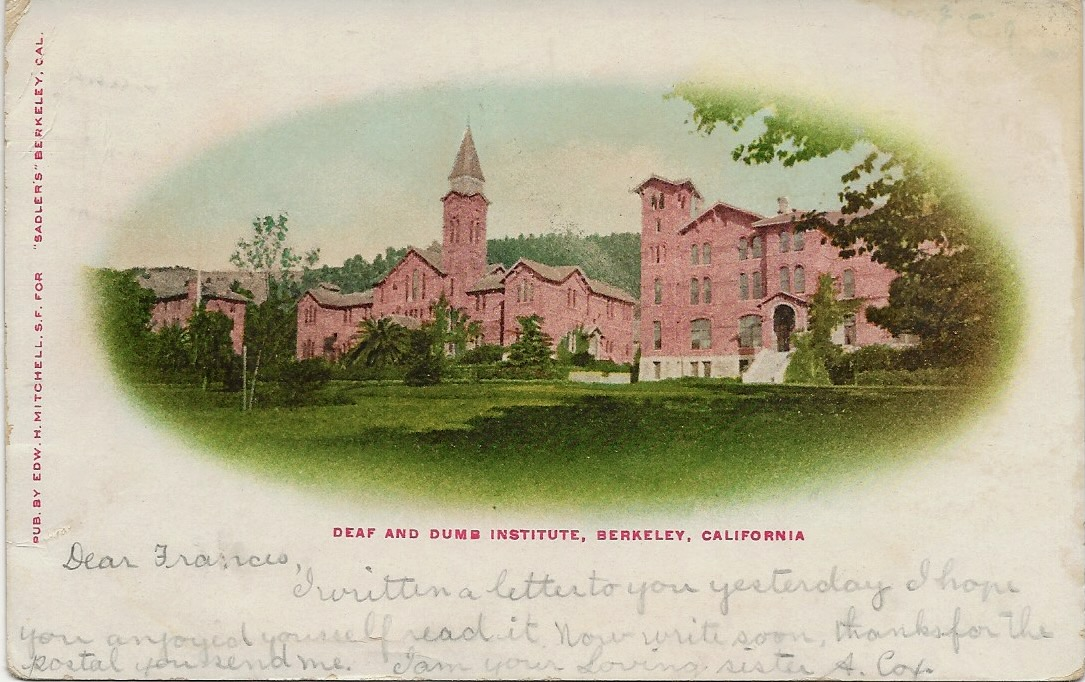
Deaf and Dumb Institute postcard as it appeared ca. 1907

- State Asylum for the Deaf, Dumb and Blind
- U.S. National Register of Historic Places
- U.S. Historic district
- Berkeley Landmark
- Location within Oakland, California Location within California
- Location: Berkeley, California
- Coordinates: 37°51′51″N 122°14′54″W
- Area: Bounded by Dwight Way, City line, Derby and Warring Streets
- Built: 1867-1914
- NRHP reference No.: 82000962
- BERKL No.: 42

Significant dates
- Added to NRHP: 1982-10-14
- Designated BERKL: September 21, 1981

The first building on the Berkeley campus was a stone Victorian Gothic building called the Deaf, Dumb and Blind Asylum, which was constructed starting in 1867. This construction was interrupted when major damage was caused as a result of the 1868 Hayward earthquake. Construction was subsequently completed and the site opened for classes.

On January 17, 1875, a devastating fire engulfed the building of the asylum, resulting in its destruction. This unfortunate event raised concerns among the Nevada State Senate and Assembly, who visited the asylum later that year to assess the well-being of the children from Nevada who had been placed in its care. They observed the aftermath of the fire but were relieved to find that the children were being accommodated in a neighboring building.

Classes continued in temporary buildings for a few years while new buildings were constructed. In an effort to rebuild and continue providing care for the children, construction for the new buildings commenced on April 30, 1877. This marked an important milestone in the institution's history as they embarked on a journey to create a new and improved facility that would meet the needs of its residents. The groundbreaking ceremony symbolized the resilience and determination of the community to overcome adversity and ensure the continuation of vital services for those in their care. This including an educational building, four dormitories, various support facilities and a private residence for the principal. In 1887 the facility was listed as the Deaf, Dumb and Blind Institute located in Berkeley, with most of the staff residing in Berkeley.

In 1890, the Spanish Colonial Revival education building was completed, featuring an assembly hall and a 160-foot (49 m) tower with a Seth Thomas clock. The education building survived the 1906 San Francisco earthquake with damage to some chimneys and the slate roof as well as interior cracks, but there was no fire and the main walls held firm.

A 1906 amendment to the Political Code changed the school's name from the Asylum for the Deaf, Dumb and Blind to the California Institution for the Deaf and Blind and established the school's place as a part of the California State school system. Dr. Wilkinson retired in 1910. The Legislature voted in 1914 to substitute the term "School" for "Institution," again changing the school's name, this time to the California School for the Deaf and Blind.

Additional buildings were erected over the years: a gymnasium in 1915, a girls' dormitory in 1925, a boys' dormitory and another classroom building in 1929, a wing added to the new classroom building in 1931, the Helen Keller Building for classes for the deaf-blind in 1949, and a new dining facility in 1957. Ms. Keller was present at the dedication of the building named in her honor.

=== School separation ===
The school was separated by a legislative act in 1922 into separate programs, the California School for the Blind (CSB) and the California School for the Deaf, although formal separation with the completion of a new classroom building did not occur until July 1929. California School for the Blind was given authorization by the state legislature in 1943 to admit the deaf-blind, becoming the third school in the country to establish a deaf-blind program. The first deaf-blind student to graduate from CSB was graduated in 1949.

The school's enrollment peaked in 1965 at 167 students. By 1973, the California Department of Education determined that the school needed to be relocated to a site more amenable to meeting accessibility for students with limited mobility and updating facilities to meet current earthquake and fire code standards. During the 1970s, a new campus was constructed in Fremont, California and the school moved to its current home there in 1980.

In 1981 the Berkeley campus was designated a Berkeley Landmark. In 1982, it was placed on the National Register of Historic Places.

The school's former site was divided between the University of California and the city of Berkeley. Both parties opened their portions of the site in 1986, the university as the Clark Kerr Campus residential complex and the city as Redwood Gardens, a home for financially needy elderly people. The school is a member of Council of Schools for the Blind (COSB).

== Campus ==
The Fremont campus has dormitory facilities.

== Curriculum ==
The school follows a nationally accepted expanded core curriculum for students who are blind or visually impaired. It includes skills training in braille reading and writing, orientation and mobility, assistive technology, career education, adapted physical education, music, art, recreation and leisure, independent living, and functional academics.

== Extracurricular activities ==
Popular activities among California School for the Blind students include swimming, karate, goalball, tandem bicycling, music groups, dance groups, international pen pals on tape, art, cooking and roller skating. Many of the school's athletes are also members of the Alameda County Special Olympics team and the United States Association of Blind Athletes.

== Notable alumni ==
- Matilda Allison (1888–1973), blind educator, stenographer
- Christine la Barraque (c. 1878–1961), singer, first blind woman admitted to the bar in California
- Kate M. Foley (1873–1940), librarian, worked on blind literacy in California
