= Flathead High School =

Public school in Montana, United States

Coordinates: 48.1911°N 114.3192°W

- 644 W. 4th Ave. Kalispell, MT 59901

Information
- Type: Public
- Established: 1903; 123 years ago
- Principal: Michele Paine
- Staff: 105.40 (FTE)
- Enrollment: 1,628 (2023–2024)
- Student to teacher ratio: 15.45
- Colors: Black and orange
- Team name: Braves/Bravettes
- Information: (406) 751-3500
- Website: flathead.sd5.k12.mt.us

Flathead High School is an American public secondary school located in Kalispell, Montana. It is one of two high schools in District #5 of the Kalispell Public Schools. Originally Flathead County High School is offers an International Baccalaureate Diploma Programme. Its teams have won various state championships. The Flathead High School mascot is the Brave and Bravette and the school colors are black and orange.

== History ==
Flathead High school was founded in the late 1890s. Its original name was Flathead County High School.

== Academics ==
Flathead High School offers the International Baccalaureate Programme, including the IB diploma programme. Flathead became the first IB school in the state of Montana on 16 February 2004 and is part of the IB North American region.

== Athletics ==
The Flathead High School mascot is the Brave and Bravette.

State Championships include:

  - Speech and Debate — 1916, 1946, 1947, 1948, 1949, 1951, 1976, 1985, 1986, 1994, 1998, 1999, 2000, 2001, 2003, 2004, 2005, 2006, 2007, 2015, 2020
  - Girls Cross Country — 1971, 1972, 1980, 1986, 1987, 1989, 1991, 1993, 1994, 1996, 2001, 2002 (#13 U.S.), 2003 (#12 U.S.), 2004 (#6 U.S.)
  - Boys Cross Country — 1985, 1986, 1994, 1997 (#24 U.S.), 1998 (#3 U.S.), 1999 (#9 U.S.), 2000 (#2 U.S.), 2001, 2002, 2004, 2005
  - Girls Track and Field — 1969, 1970, 1971, 1973, 1977, 1978, 1979, 1988, 1989, 1991, 1992, 1993, 1994, 1995, 1998, 1999, 2005
  - Girls Swimming —1977, 1978 1981, 1982, 1990, 1991, 1992, 1995, 2003, 2005 (tie)
  - Boys Wrestling — 1973, 2004, 2006, 2007, 2008, 2009, 2010, 2017, 2022
  - Girls Wrestling - 2022
  - Boys Track and Field — 1907, 1995, 1996, 2000, 2001, 2002, 2003
  - Football — 1950, 1951, 1958, 1959, 1970
  - Boys Basketball — 1951, 1952, 1970, 1982, 1989
  - Boys Soccer — 1994, 1995, 1999, 2005, 2006
  - Boys Golf — 1966, 1983
  - Girls Golf — 1966, 1967, 1970, 1991
  - Girls Basketball — 1996, 2000, 2001
  - Boys Tennis — 1995, 1996
  - Girls Soccer — 1993
  - Girls Softball — 2003
  - Girls Tennis — 2000
  - Girls Volleyball — 2001
  - Boys Swimming — 1986

== Notable alumni ==
- Flip Gordon, Class of 2010, professional wrestler
- Brock Osweiler, Class of 2009, professional football player
- Shane Bitney Crone, Class of 2004, filmmaker, writer, and speaker
- Lex Hilliard, Class of 2003, professional football player
- Mike Reilly, Class of 2002, professional football player
- Dylan McFarland, Class of 1999, professional football player
- Daniel Parker, Class of 1978, wildlife sculptor
- Alice Ritzman, Class of 1970, professional golfer
- Sam McCullum, Class of 1970, professional football player
- Jim Otten, Class of 1969, professional baseball player
- Eugene Peterson, Class of 1953, clergyman, scholar, author, and poet
- Ruth Anderson, Class of 1945 or 1946, composer, orchestrator, teacher, and flutist
- Willard A. Saunders, Class of 1923, Rear admiral, USN
- Fred Brinkman, Class of 1912, architect
