= Charles E. Huber =

American politician (1845–1904)

Charles Edward Huber (c. 1845–1904) was from a well-known family in Los Angeles, California, at the turn of the 19th and 20th centuries and served on the city's governing body, the Common Council, between 1873 and 1875. Near the end of his life he was engaged in several court cases and was sent to a state hospital for the mentally ill.

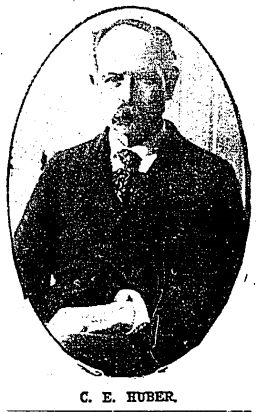

== Personal ==
=== Family ===
Huber was born about 1845, the son of Joseph and Apolonia Huber. He had two brothers, Charles Edward Huber and Joseph Huber, and two sisters— Emeline (Mrs. Ozro W.) Childs and Mary Louisa Fisher.

A widower, Huber had two daughters—Mary Louisa (Lulu) Huber (Fisher) and Gertie Huber. The family lived at 830 South Broadway.

=== Vocation ===
He was at one time a deputy sheriff and later was in real estate, including being an agent for several downtown buildings.

=== Legal problems ===
Beginning in 1900 Huber's name was in the newspapers several times in connection with his mental condition or with the results of his actions.

He appeared at a Police Commission meeting and threatened to "blow out the brains" of police officers who, he said, were "interfering" with some of the tenants of Chinatown property that he controlled. In November 1900 he went to the home of his sister, Emeline Childs, at 11th and Main streets, seeking the "return" of $1,000 he said she owed him, smashed the glass panels of the front door and all the windows on the front of the house and threatened a butler with a double-barreled shotgun. An insanity complaint was filed against him by Emeline's son-in-law, Frank S. Hicks, and, after a standoff at Huber's house, with Huber again holding the shotgun and threatening the police, he was arrested. In a hearing on November 12, 1900, two doctors testified that he was sane. He was sent to the County Hospital, but after two weeks he was discharged from custody.

In April 1901, Huber sued Emeline Childs and Frank Hicks for $20,000 in damages because, Huber claimed, "the defendants, actuated through personal spite and malice toward him, falsely and unreasonably accused him of being an insane person."

The next month, Huber, who was collecting rents from tenants, was arrested in Ferguson Alley, Chinatown, when he remonstrated with a police officer who had been ripping up lottery tickets that the officer had discovered in "some of the Chinese houses there" and, Huber said, threw the fragments in his face. It was said that Huber then threatened to "blow the policeman's head off."

Upon being tried on June 7, 1901, for disturbing the peace, Huber was found innocent after a juror asked the judge, "Has an officer the right to enter a house this way without a search warrant?" Judge Morgan responded: "[E]very person has a right to defend his constitutional rights."

The decision led the Times to add:

For many years it has been the idea of most white people that the Chinese have no particular rights in their houses, and that the first and foremost function of Chinatown is to amuse the dominant race. People go ambling through the establishments of Chinatown without bothering to offer excuses, fingering and pointing and remarking. The policemen invade the whole rookery, from top to bottom at pleasure.

In August 1901 Huber filed suit against Police Chief Charles Elton, alleging malicious prosecution and false imprisonment.

Huber was again arrested in June 1902 after he became "very wild" on a train from San Francisco to Los Angeles and "with his threats kept everybody in a constant state of apprehension." He claimed to have purchased the Palace Hotel, the Russ House and the San Francisco Chronicle. Officers met the train in Los Angeles and took Huber to the County Hospital.

During the next months, Huber's mental condition grew worse, and, as the Los Angeles Times put it, he was "reduced to a pitiable plight." The newspaper continued;

He fancies that he has $20,000,000, and goes around to all his friends promising them gifts of small fortunes and asking them to give up work and accept a salary from him. On the night of May 30 he was found on Spring Street by a policeman holding to two little flower girls to whom he wanted to give $20 apiece. They were frightened and crying. . . . Shortly after that he went to San Francisco, the eleventh time he had made the trip in thirty days. . . . He is said to have mortgaged his property here and to have squandered his money. He came from San Francisco with a . . . stenographer and an electrical expert and an aide de camp or two. He said he had a great instrument by which he could cure almost every earthly ailment. . . .

After a court hearing in June 1902, he was sent to the State Asylum for the Insane in Napa, California. His daughter Mary Louise Huber was made guardian of his estate.

Huber died almost two years later—on June 27, 1904—at the age of fifty-nine.

== Common Council ==
Huber was elected on December 1, 1873, to represent the 3rd Ward on the Los Angeles Common Council and was reelected twice more to end his service on the council on December 6, 1877. In 1898 he was the Democratic candidate in the 4th Ward, but he was defeated by Republican Herman Silver.
