= Matilda Allison =

American educator (1888–1973)

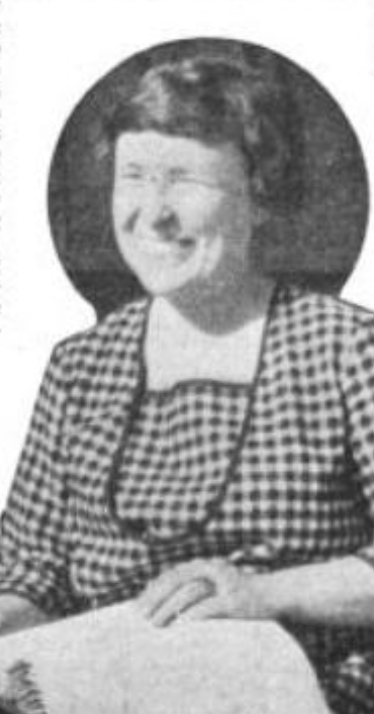
- Allison posing with a braille book, from a 1922 publication
- Born: Matilda Eva Allison; February 18, 1888; Lincoln, California, US
- Died: November 21, 1973 (aged 85); Los Angeles, California, US
- Other names: Tillie Allison; Mathilda Allison; Matilda Lavery; Matilda Allison Williams
- Occupations: Stenographer; typist; educator

Matilda Eva Allison (February 18, 1888 – November 21, 1973) was an American educator, a blind woman working with blind students, including veterans of World War I. She passed California's civil service examination in 1919, opening career opportunities for other blind office workers.

== Early life and education ==
Allison was from Lincoln, California, the daughter of William Allison and Ingeborg Catherina Krogh (later Engellenner). She was blinded by an injury when she was seven years old. She was raised mainly by her Danish-born mother and grandmother. She graduated at the top of her class from the California School for the Deaf and Blind in 1909. In 1910, she was briefly institutionalized as despondent and "suddenly insane", but soon recovered. She was one of the early West Coast graduates of The Seeing Eye training course, when it was held in Berkeley in 1930.

== Career ==
In the 1920s Allison worked as a dictaphone operator, typist, and clinical stenographer, and taught newly-blind veterans at Napa State Hospital. "My routine day consists of taking clinical, pathological and bacteriological dictation from nine doctors," she told a 1922 interviewer. She also volunteered as a braille teacher at the state soldiers' home in Yountville, and traveled to Hawaii in 1925 to lecture on blind education there. "She being blind herself, having, by supreme effort secured a wonderful education, devotes much of her time in instructing the blind throughout this country", a 1928 report explained. She was also assistant editor of the Imola Times, an internal newspaper of the Napa State Hospital.

Allison was described as "the first blind person in America to pass a state civil service examination", or at least the first in California. She took the California civil service examination, and passed in 1919, allowing her to expect the same pay as sighted typists and stenographers. Her effort also opened the California civil service examination to other blind applicants.

Allison taught classes in braille transcription. She gave lectures and demonstrations of her office skills at business colleges, and spoke to community groups and girls' organizations as well. She lectured on guide dogs with her own German shepherd companion, Betty, and her success with a guide dog was considered by the California legislature, in support of a 1931 resolution to furnish guide dogs to blind veterans.

She was California state chaplain of the Women's Auxiliary of the American Legion. She addressed radio audiences in 1930, and was elected to serve as delegate to the American Legion Auxiliary's national convention in Boston that year, where she was a candidate for national chaplain of the organization. She was also president of the Napa YWCA Council, vice-president of the California Association for the Blind, and a charter member of the East Bay Club of Blind Women.

As Matilda Allison Williams after her second marriage, she was executive director of Voluntary Aid for the Blind.

== Personal life ==
Matilda Allison married at least three times. She married her first husband, James Barr Lavery, an executive at the blind soldiers' home, in 1932. In 1934, she was declared incompetent and placed under a legal guardianship. Her sister, Mabel Ida Bidwell, served as her guardian, until Edgar Williams took over in 1936. In 1937, she was ruled competent again. Edgar Williams, her guardian, became her second husband in 1938; he died in 1953. In 1967, she was known as Mrs. Gerald McLean.
