= Brock Osweiler =

American football player (born 1990)

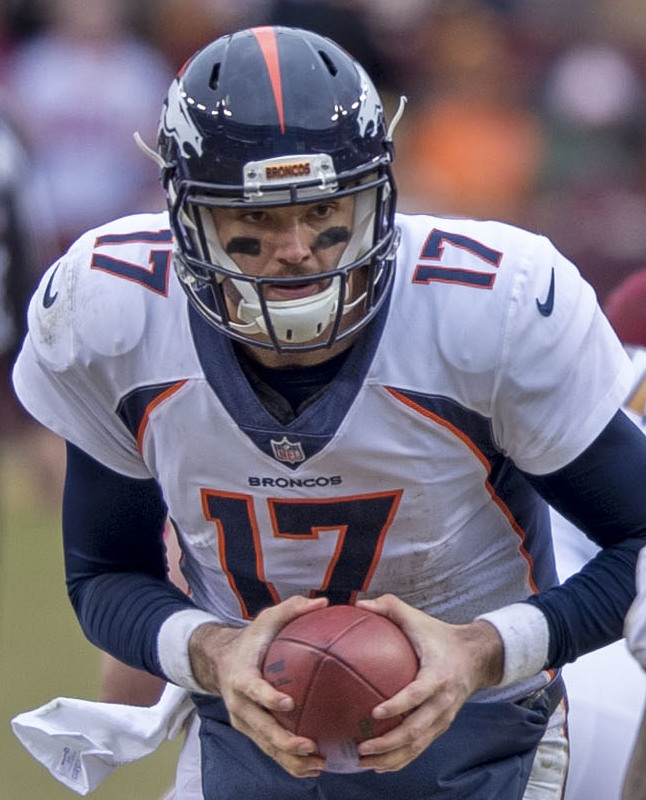
- Osweiler with the Denver Broncos in 2017

No. 6, 17, 8
- Position: Quarterback

Personal information
- Born: November 22, 1990 (age 35); Coeur d'Alene, Idaho, U.S.
- Listed height: 6 ft 7 in (2.01 m)
- Listed weight: 240 lb (109 kg)

Career information
- High school: Flathead (Kalispell, Montana)
- College: Arizona State (2009–2011)
- NFL draft: 2012: 2nd round, 57th overall pick

Career history
- Denver Broncos (2012–2015); Houston Texans (2016); Cleveland Browns (2017)*; Denver Broncos (2017); Miami Dolphins (2018)
- * Offseason or practice squad member only

Awards and highlights
- Super Bowl champion (50)

Career NFL statistics
- Passing attempts: 1,165
- Passing completions: 697
- Completion percentage: 59.8%
- TD–INT: 37–31
- Passing yards: 7,418
- Passer rating: 78
- Stats at Pro Football Reference

Brock Alan Osweiler (born November 22, 1990) is an American former professional football quarterback who played in the National Football League (NFL) for seven seasons. He played college football for the Arizona State Sun Devils and was selected by the Denver Broncos in the second round of the 2012 NFL draft. Osweiler first served as the Broncos' starter during their Super Bowl-winning season in 2015 when he relieved an injured Peyton Manning and helped Denver get the top seed in the AFC heading into the postseason, although Manning resumed his starting duties for the playoffs and eventual Super Bowl 50 victory.

After the Super Bowl, Osweiler became the starting quarterback for the Houston Texans, but an unsuccessful 2016 campaign resulted in him being traded to the Cleveland Browns the following offseason. Osweiler eventually returned to Denver in a backup role upon his release from the Browns and played his final season as a backup with the Miami Dolphins.

== Early life ==
Born in Coeur d'Alene, Idaho, on November 22, 1990, Osweiler was raised by his parents, Kathy and John Osweiler, in Kalispell, Montana. Osweiler attended Flathead High School. His older brother, Tanner, played college football in the National Association of Intercollegiate Athletics (NAIA) at Montana Tech in Butte. John received scholarship offers to play football at Montana and Montana State, but ultimately chose to enter the military out of high school.

Osweiler played both football and basketball; football was the dominant sport in Montana, so he traveled to neighboring states to play for Amateur Athletic Union (AAU) basketball teams in Portland, Oregon, and Seattle, Yakima, and Spokane, Washington. In 2006, after his freshman year of high school, Osweiler committed to Gonzaga University in Spokane to play basketball, but later decided to focus on playing college football. As a senior, he was the 2008–09 Gatorade Player of the Year in football for Montana after completing 189 of 303 passes for 2,703 yards and 29 touchdowns; Osweiler also rushed 162 times for 700 yards and 13 touchdowns.

== College career ==
Osweiler chose to attend Arizona State University over scholarship offers from Stanford and Washington State.

As a true freshman in 2009, Osweiler played in six games with one start. He became the first true freshman to start a game for the Sun Devils since Jake Plummer in 1993. Osweiler finished the season completing 24 of 55 passes for 249 yards, two touchdowns, and two interceptions.

As a sophomore in 2010, Osweiler again played in six games with one start. For the season, he completed 62 of 109 passes for 797 yards and five touchdowns to go along with 38 carries for 124 yards and a touchdown.

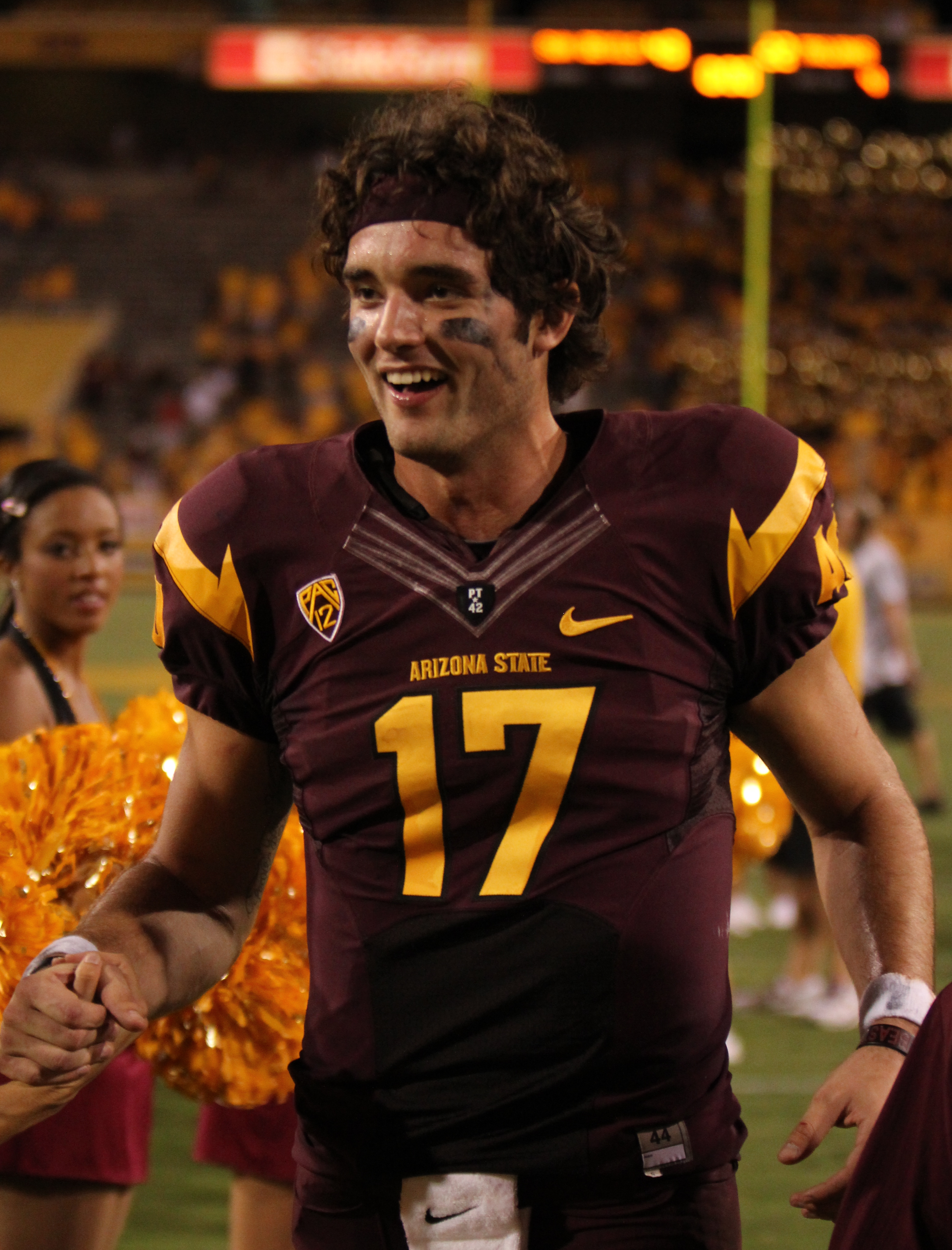
Osweiler in 2011

As a junior in 2011, Osweiler took over as the Sun Devils starting quarterback after the retirement of Steven Threet. He finished the season with 4,036 passing yards, 26 touchdowns, and 13 interceptions to go along with 90 rushing yards and three touchdowns.

== Professional career ==
=== Pre-draft ===
Pre-draft measurables
Height	Weight	Arm length	Hand span	Wingspan	Wonderlic
6 ft 6 7/8 in (2.00 m)	242 lb (110 kg)	33 7/8 in (0.86 m)	9 7/8 in (0.25 m)	6 ft 7 3/8 in (2.02 m)	25
All values from NFL Combine

Osweiler was rated the sixth best quarterback in the 2012 NFL draft by NFLDraftScout.com. He measured 6 feet 6 7/8 inches (2.003 m) tall at the 2012 NFL Combine, instead of the 6 feet 8 inches (2.03 m) that the media had touted throughout his Arizona State career. Osweiler scored a 25 on the Wonderlic.

=== Denver Broncos (first stint) ===
==== 2012 season ====
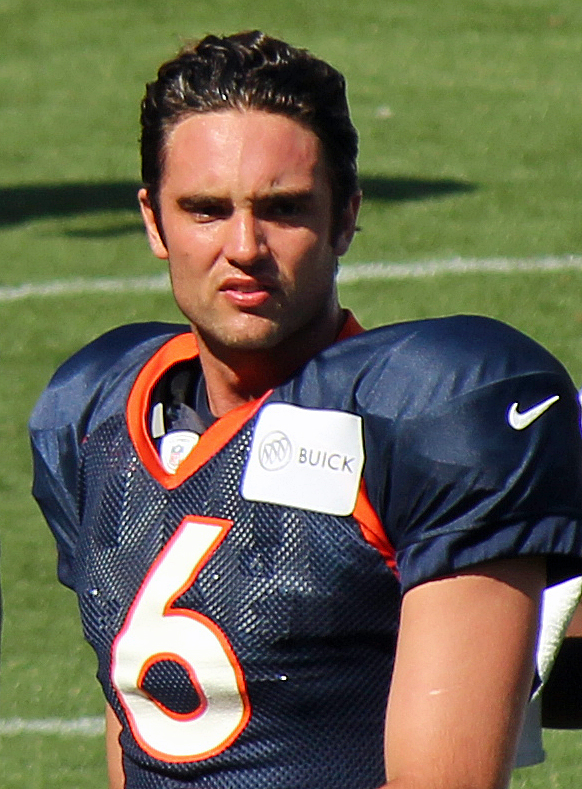
Osweiler in 2012

Osweiler was selected in the second round (57th overall) of the draft by the Denver Broncos. He signed a four-year rookie contract worth $3,516,000 through the 2015 season.

Osweiler made his NFL debut in the Week 4 37–6 victory over the Oakland Raiders. During the regular season finale against the Kansas City Chiefs, he completed two-of-four passes for 12 yards in the 38–3 victory.

==== 2013 season ====
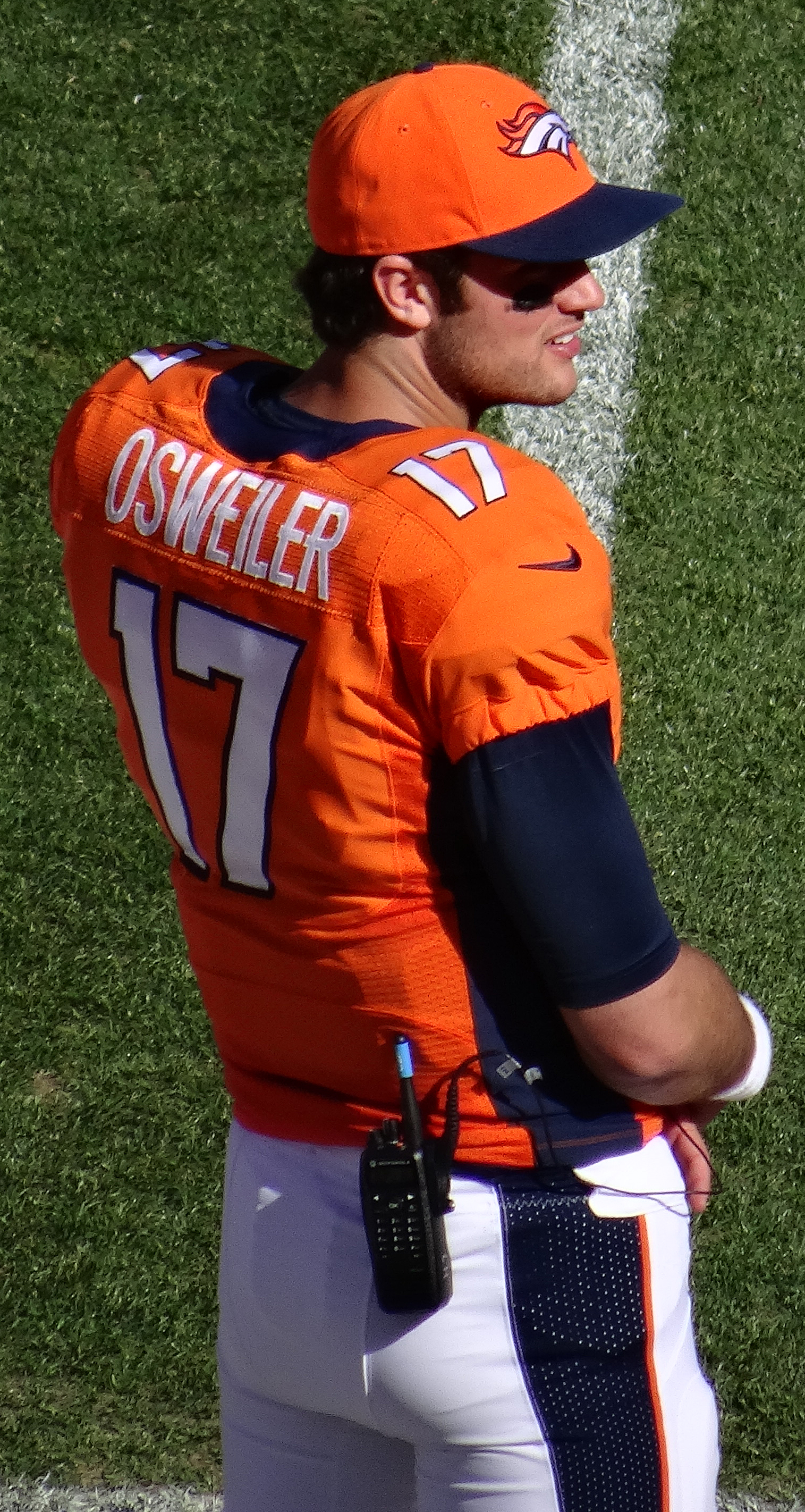
Osweiler in 2013

During a Week 4 52–20 victory over the Philadelphia Eagles, Osweiler completed two-of-three passes for 10 yards and rushed twice for three yards. During Week 12 against the New England Patriots, he was put into the line in an attempt to block the Patriots' game-winning field goal, as Osweiler was the tallest member of the team at the time, measuring 6 feet 7 inches (2.01 m). The Broncos went on to lose on the road in overtime by a score of 34–31. In the regular-season finale against the Raiders, he completed nine of 13 passes for 85 yards during the 34–14 road victory.

==== 2014 season ====
During a Week 7 41–17 victory over the San Francisco 49ers on Sunday Night Football, Osweiler attempted one incomplete pass. Three weeks later against the Raiders, he completed two of five passes for 13 yards in the 41–17 road victory. During Week 15 against the San Diego Chargers, Osweiler had two incomplete passes in the 22–10 road victory. In the regular season finale against the Raiders, he completed both of his pass attempts for 39 yards and his first NFL touchdown during the 47–14 victory.

==== 2015 season ====
During Week 10 against the Chiefs, Osweiler took over for Peyton Manning, who was benched after throwing four interceptions and posting a passer rating of 0.0. Osweiler finished the 29–13 loss with 146 passing yards, a touchdown, and an interception to go along with three carries for 18 yards.

The Broncos later announced that Osweiler would start in place of the injured Manning the following week against the Chicago Bears. In his first start on his 25th birthday, Osweiler completed 20-of-27 passes for 250 yards and two touchdowns for a 127.1 passer rating during the narrow 17–15 road victory. He became the first player to start and win his first career game on his birthday. Osweiler was named AFC Offensive Player of the Week for his performance against the Bears. Osweiler was presented the game ball after the game by head coach Gary Kubiak. The next day, it was announced that Osweiler would start the following week against the Patriots. He led the Broncos to a 30–24 overtime victory on Sunday Night Football over the then-undefeated Patriots and finished with 270 passing yards, a touchdown, and an interception.

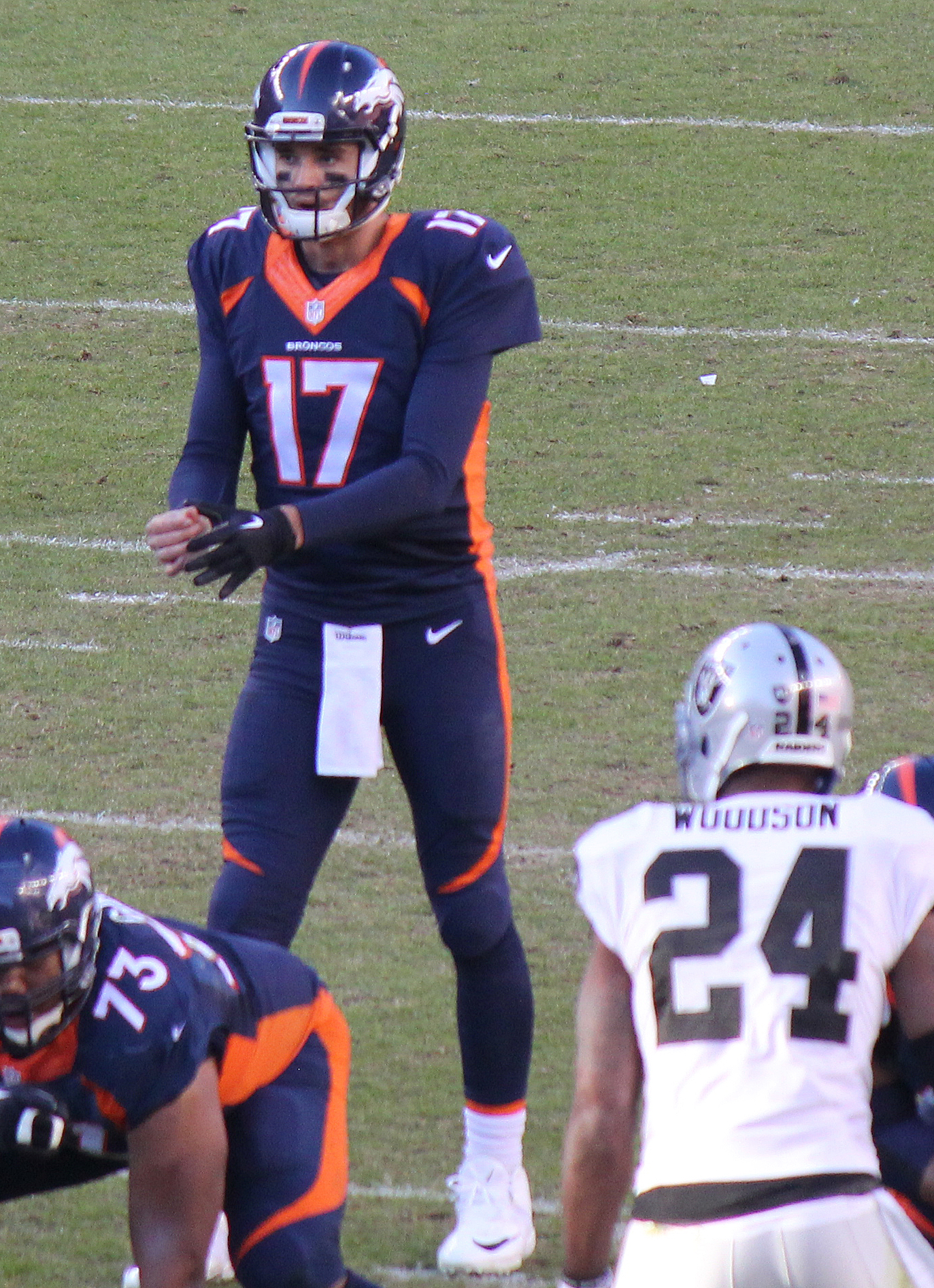
Osweiler in a game against the Oakland Raiders

With Manning still injured, Osweiler started his third consecutive game during Week 13 against the San Diego Chargers. He finished the 17–3 victory throwing for 166 yards, a touchdown, and an interception. In the next game against the Raiders, Osweiler completed 35-of-51 passes for 308 yards during the 15–12 loss.

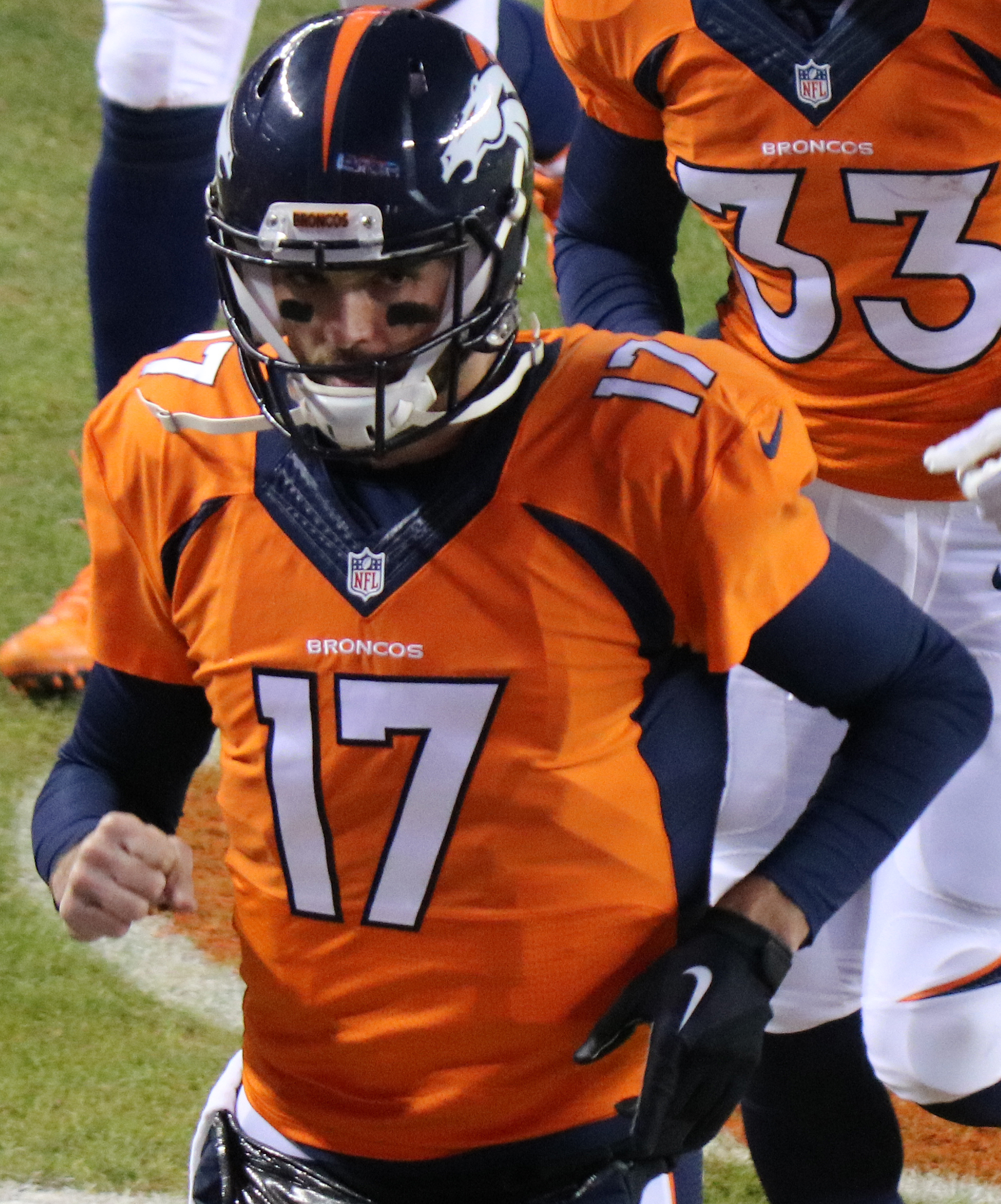
Osweiler in December 2015

On December 15, it was announced that Osweiler would start his fifth consecutive game against the Pittsburgh Steelers, despite the fact that Manning had returned to practice. Osweiler finished the 34–27 road loss with 296 passing yards, three touchdowns, and an interception to go along with five carries for 19 yards and a touchdown. During Week 16, Osweiler started his sixth consecutive game against the Cincinnati Bengals, completing 27-of-39 passes for 299 yards and a touchdown in the 20–17 overtime comeback victory. In the regular season finale against the Chargers, Osweiler was replaced by Manning in the third quarter after throwing for 232 yards, a touchdown, and two interceptions with one fumble. Manning led the Broncos to a 27–20 victory and helped them secure the top seed in the AFC. On January 7, 2016, the team announced that Osweiler suffered a low-grade strain to the MCL of his right knee in the game against the Chargers.

Osweiler finished the 2015 season with 1,967 passing yards, 10 touchdowns, and six interceptions to go along with 21 carries for 61 yards and a touchdown. Despite Osweiler seeing no playing time in the postseason, his 5–2 record as a starter in the regular season (while Manning was sidelined with a foot injury) was instrumental in helping Denver capture the top seed in the AFC and earned home-field advantage over the Patriots in the AFC Championship Game. Osweiler was active as the backup quarterback as the Broncos won Super Bowl 50 over the Carolina Panthers by a score of 24–10.

=== Houston Texans ===
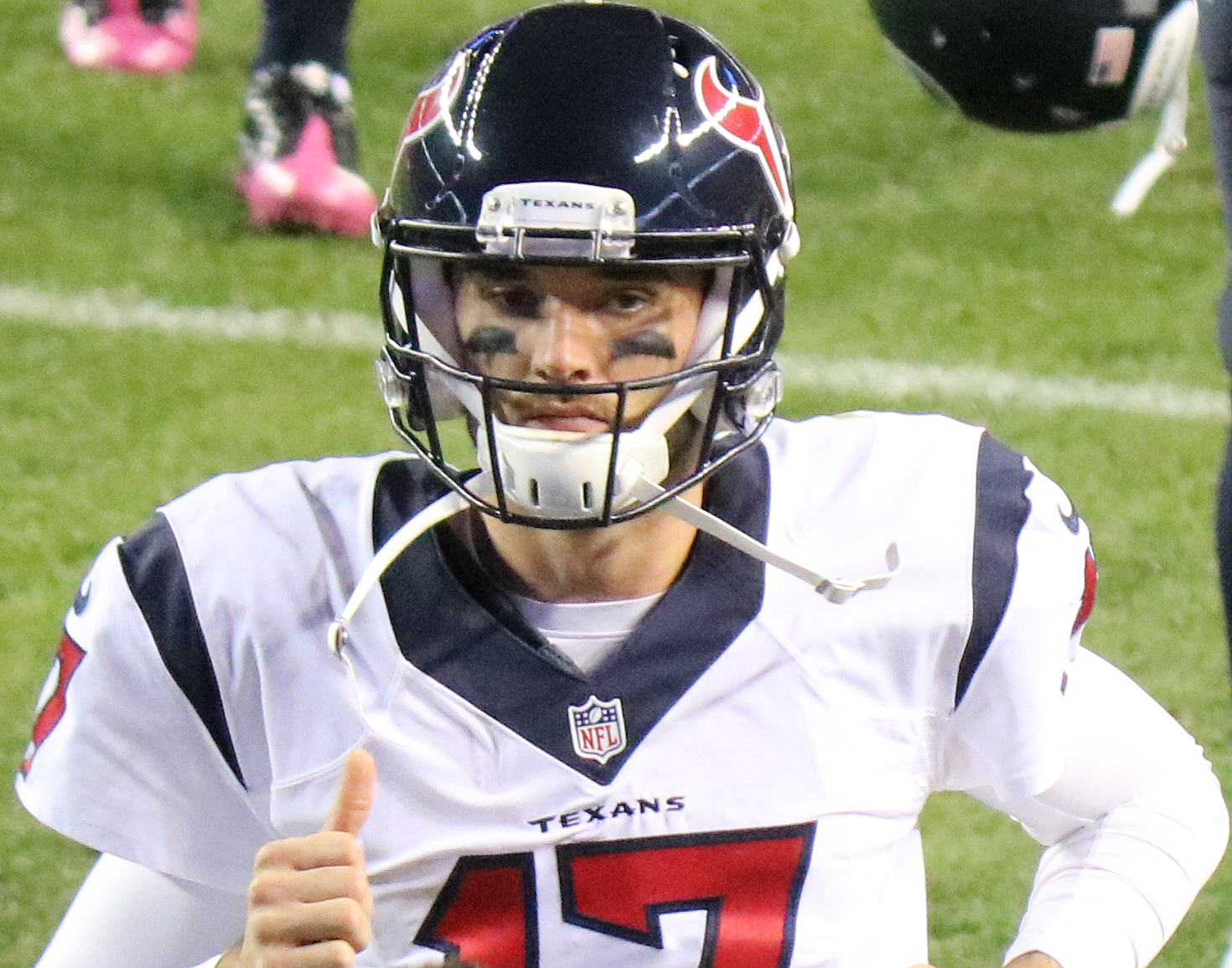
Osweiler in 2016

On March 9, 2016, Osweiler signed a four-year, $72 million contract ($37 million guaranteed) with the Houston Texans.

In his Texans debut on September 11, 2016, Osweiler threw for 231 yards, two touchdowns, and an interception during the season-opening 23–14 victory over the Bears. Despite his strong start, Osweiler began to struggle as the season progressed. During Week 7 against his former team, the Denver Broncos, on Monday Night Football, Osweiler had a total of three fumbles with one lost in the 27–9 road loss. During a Week 12 21–13 loss to the Chargers, he threw for 246 yards, no touchdowns, and three interceptions, but contributed a one-yard rushing touchdown.

During a narrow Week 15 21–20 comeback victory over the Jacksonville Jaguars, Osweiler was benched for Tom Savage after throwing back-to-back first-half interceptions. The two interceptions brought Osweiler's season total to 16, setting a single-season Texans franchise record. Savage was then named the starter for the Week 16 matchup against the Cincinnati Bengals. In the regular-season finale against the Tennessee Titans, Osweiler entered the game in relief of Savage, who suffered a concussion. Osweiler finished the 24–17 road loss completing 21-of-40 passes for 253 yards and a touchdown while also rushing for a one-yard touchdown.

Osweiler finished the 2016 season with 2,957 passing yards, 15 touchdowns, and 16 interceptions to go along with 30 carries for 131 yards and two touchdowns in 15 games and 14 starts. Due to Savage's injury, Osweiler started in the Wild Card Round against the Raiders. He finished the 27–14 victory completing 14-of-25 passes for 168 yards and a touchdown to go along with six carries for 15 yards and a touchdown. Shortly after the game, head coach Bill O'Brien announced that Osweiler would remain the team's starter for the Divisional Round against the Patriots even though Savage had cleared concussion protocol. Osweiler finished the 34–16 road loss completing 23-of-40 passes for 198 yards, a touchdown, and three interceptions to go along with an 18-yard rush.

=== Cleveland Browns ===
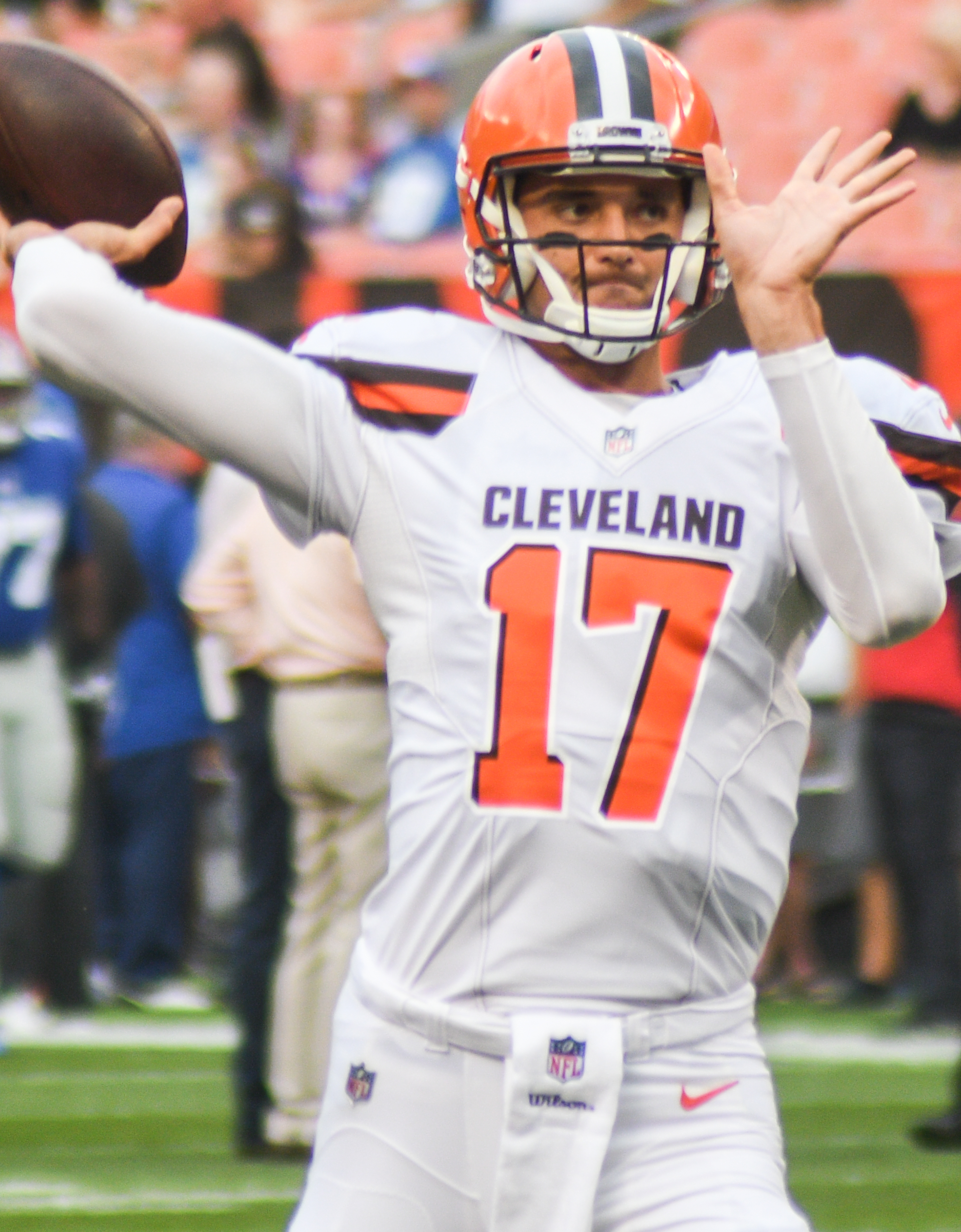
Osweiler in 2017

On March 9, 2017, Osweiler was traded to the Cleveland Browns along with the Texans' 2017 sixth-round pick and 2018 second-round pick in exchange for the Browns' 2017 fourth-round compensatory pick. This trade was termed by ESPN's Adam Schefter as possibly the most creative trade in NFL history. The move allowed Cleveland to absorb some of Osweiler's cap from Houston in exchange for draft picks, one of the first trades of its kind.

On September 2, 2017, Osweiler was released after rookie DeShone Kizer was named the starter.

=== Denver Broncos (second stint) ===
On September 2, 2017, Osweiler signed a one-year contract with the Broncos after backup quarterback Paxton Lynch sustained a shoulder injury. His contract was worth the league-minimum $775,000, leaving the Browns to pay the remaining $15.25 million of Osweiler's $16 million guaranteed.

On November 1, it was announced that Osweiler would start in the Week 9 matchup against the Eagles in place of the benched Trevor Siemian. He finished the 51–23 road loss with 208 passing yards, a touchdown, and two interceptions. Osweiler then started the team's next two games against the Patriots and the Bengals, throwing a touchdown and an interception in both games.

On November 21, Osweiler was benched after Lynch was named the starter for the Week 12 matchup against the Raiders. Lynch was injured during his lone start and relieved by Siemian. Three weeks later against the Indianapolis Colts on Thursday Night Football, Siemian was injured and relieved by Osweiler. Osweiler played well, throwing for 194 yards and two touchdowns while also rushing for 15 yards and a touchdown, en route to leading the Broncos to a 25–13 road victory. He then started in Week 16 against the Washington Redskins and finished the 27–11 road loss with 193 passing yards and an interception.

Osweiler finished the 2017 season with 1,088 passing yards, five touchdowns, and five interceptions to go along with 14 carries for 64 yards and a touchdown in six games and four starts.

=== Miami Dolphins ===
On March 23, 2018, Osweiler signed a one-year deal worth $880,000 with the Miami Dolphins, reuniting him with his former Broncos offensive coordinator Adam Gase.

During Week 4 against the Patriots, Osweiler relieved Ryan Tannehill and threw a touchdown to Frank Gore in the fourth quarter. Osweiler finished the 38–7 road loss completing four of five passes for 35 yards and the aforementioned touchdown to go along with a seven-yard rush. He was named the starter for the Week 6 matchup against the Bears after Tannehill was inactive due to a shoulder injury. Osweiler finished the 31–28 overtime victory passing for 380 yards, three touchdowns, and two interceptions. With the victory over the Bears, he improved to a 4–0 career record in overtime games, which is an NFL record winning percentage in overtime NFL games in a career. In the next game against the Detroit Lions, Osweiler completed 22-of-31 passes for 239 yards and two touchdowns during the 32–21 loss. The following week against his former team, the Houston Texans, on Thursday Night Football, Osweiler threw for 241 yards and an interception in the 42–23 road loss.

During Week 9 against the New York Jets, Osweiler had 139 passing yards in the 13–6 victory. In the next game against the Green Bay Packers, he threw for 213 yards and an interception during the 31–12 road loss.

Osweiler finished the 2018 season with 1,247 passing yards, six touchdowns, and four interceptions to go along with eight carries for 21 yards in seven games and five starts.

=== Retirement and broadcasting career ===
On October 16, 2019, Osweiler announced his retirement from the NFL.

In 2022, Osweiler joined ESPN as a college football analyst. Two years later, it was announced that he would serve as an ambassador for SHARx, a patient advocacy company for uninsured and underinsured Americans. In a statement announcing his ambassadorship, Osweiler said: "This is a passion of mine because it hits so close to home. Those closest to me have experienced the loss of loved ones because the high price of the drugs they needed made access impossible."

== Career statistics ==
Legend
	Won the Super Bowl
**Bold**	Career high

=== NFL ===
==== Regular season ====
Year	Team	Games			Passing								Rushing				Sacked		Fumbles	
Year	Team	GP	GS	Record	Cmp	Att	Pct	Yds	Avg	TD	Int	Rtg	Att	Yds	Avg	TD	Sck	SckY	Fum	Lost
2012	DEN	5	0	–	2	4	50.0	12	3.0	0	0	56.2	8	−13	−1.6	0	0	0	0	0
2013	DEN	4	0	–	11	16	**68.8**	95	5.9	0	0	84.1	3	2	0.7	0	2	8	0	0
2014	DEN	4	0	–	4	10	40.0	52	5.2	1	0	**90.4**	8	0	0.0	0	0	0	0	0
2015	DEN	8	7	**5–2**	170	275	61.8	1,967	**7.2**	10	6	86.4	21	61	2.9	1	23	151	4	**1**
2016	HOU	15	14	8–6	**301**	**510**	59.0	**2,957**	5.8	**15**	**16**	72.2	**30**	**131**	4.4	**2**	**27**	**206**	**5**	**1**
2017	DEN	6	4	0–4	96	172	55.8	1,088	6.3	5	5	72.5	14	64	**4.6**	1	10	64	2	**1**
2018	MIA	7	5	2–3	113	178	63.5	1,247	7.0	6	4	86.0	8	21	2.6	0	17	130	1	**1**
Career		49	30	15–15	697	1,165	59.8	7,418	6.4	37	31	78.0	92	266	2.9	4	79	559	12	4

==== Postseason ====
Year	Team	Games			Passing								Rushing				Sacked		Fumbles	
Year	Team	GP	GS	Record	Cmp	Att	Pct	Yds	Avg	TD	Int	Rtg	Att	Yds	Avg	TD	Sck	SckY	Fum	Lost
2015	DEN	0	0	–	DNP															
2016	HOU	2	2	1–1	37	65	56.9	365	5.6	2	3	63.9	7	33	4.7	1	3	17	1	0
Career		2	2	1–1	37	65	56.9	365	5.6	2	3	63.9	7	33	4.7	1	3	17	1	0

=== College ===
Season	Team	Passing								Rushing			
Season	Team	Cmp	Att	Pct	Yds	Y/A	TD	Int	Rtg	Att	Yds	Avg	TD
2009	Arizona State	24	55	43.6	249	4.5	2	2	86.4	16	7	0.4	0
2010	Arizona State	62	109	56.9	797	7.3	5	0	133.4	38	**124**	**3.3**	1
2011	Arizona State	**326**	**516**	**63.2**	**4,036**	**7.8**	**26**	**13**	**140.5**	**83**	90	1.1	**3**
Career		412	680	60.6	5,082	7.5	33	15	135.0	137	221	1.6	4

== Personal life ==
Osweiler married Erin Costales in February 2014. They have two daughters.
