= Henry Peavey =

Hollywood cook and valet (1882–1931)

- Henry Peavey in 1922
- Born: March 3, 1882
- Died: December 27, 1931 (aged 49); San Francisco, California, U.S.
- Occupations: Cook, valet

Henry Peavey (March 3, 1882 – December 27, 1931) was the cook and valet of Hollywood silent film director William Desmond Taylor. Peavey served in the first World War and worked for Taylor for six months prior to Taylor's murder in 1922.

== Employment by Taylor ==
Prior to working for William Desmond Taylor, Peavey was employed by the wife of director Christy Cabanne. Peavey was hired by Taylor after he dismissed his previous butler, Edward F. Sands, for forging his signature on checks.

Three days before Taylor's murder, Peavey had been arrested for "social vagrancy" and charged with being "lewd and dissolute". Taylor was scheduled to appear in court on Peavey's behalf on February 2, 1922, but was murdered the day before.

=== Taylor's death ===
Peavey discovered Taylor's body at 7:30 on the morning of February 2, 1922. He was repeatedly questioned by police and reporters for possible leads, but was of little help. Some Hearst reporters suspected that Peavey was withholding information, so they kidnapped him a few weeks after the crime and attempted to scare him into a confession. In a 1930 interview, Peavey expressed the widely unsupported belief that actress Mabel Normand was Taylor's killer.

Henry Peavey in 1922

== Death ==
A few months after the Taylor murder, Peavey left Los Angeles and moved to San Francisco. In 1930, he was admitted to the Napa State Hospital with general paresis due to an untreated case of syphilis. He died there of tertiary syphilis on December 27, 1931.
