= Daniel Parker (artist) =

American wildlife sculptor and painter (born 1959)

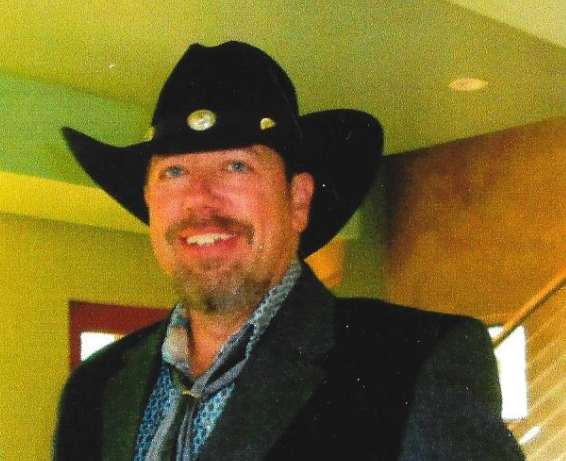
- Daniel Parker in 2013
- Born: Daniel Ray Parker; November 18, 1959; Portland, Oregon, US
- Education: Self-taught
- Known for: Sculpture, painting
- Notable work: Members Only; Yellowstone Legacy; Black Mesa Mulies; The Watcher; Brooks Falls
- Movement: Animalier school (modern)
- Spouse: Jeanne Drollinger
- Children: Joshua, Shannon, Lindsey
- Patrons: Jack Nicklaus; Robert A. Funk; Meredith Hodges
- Website: ParkerBronze.com

Daniel Ray Parker (born November 18, 1959) is an American wildlife sculptor and painter. Parker has won multiple awards for wildlife sculpture at major art shows in the United States. He is a resident of Kalispell, Montana.

== Early life ==
Parker was born on November 18, 1959, in Portland, Oregon. He is the son of Donald Edward "Don" Parker (1938–2015) and Joan Arlue Sievers (1939-2019). The Parkers had moved to Portland in early 1959 from Kalispell, Montana, to find work but after less than a year in Oregon they moved back to Kalispell, their home town. Parker's great grandfather, originally from Norridgewock, Maine, had moved to the Flathead Valley in 1905 from Parker, Minnesota, to homestead on a farm on the Flathead River, near Demersville, about five miles south of Kalispell and two miles north of Flathead Lake.

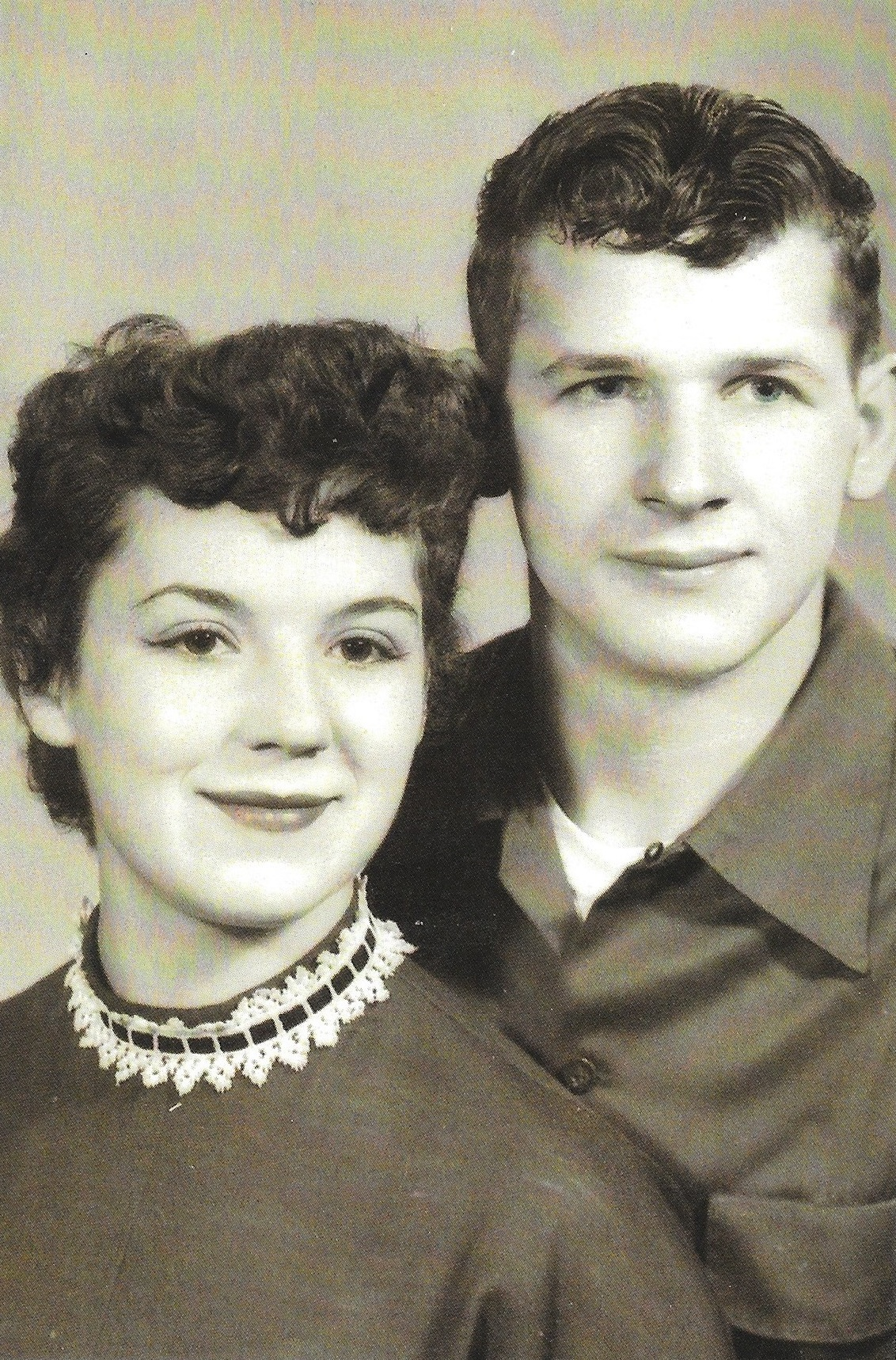
The parents of Daniel Parker in 1956

Parker's father, who by 1963 was an aspiring country western singer and guitarist, met a woman nearly twice his age in a Kalispell night club and decided to eschew his marital and parental responsibilities by leaving town with her—abandoning his family—and headed for California where he thought he would become a famous musician but instead took construction work building a tunnel. After moving to Hendersonville, Tennessee, in 1966, Don did have some mild success when he toured with Tommy Cash and later recorded a single as the duet "Don & Carla" with 50 States Records, but long-term success would evade him due largely to an affinity for alcohol. The 45 record he recorded was not successful, selling only a few thousand copies. He did, however, succeed as a night club performer and headlined some state fairs in the late 1960s, one such performance being in Missoula, Montana, at the Western Montana Fair, that was rained out. Daniel's mother, Joan, held out hope that Don would return to Kalispell to help raise his children; he never did. Also, he never provided any child support or alimony, so in October 1962 she was granted a divorce on the ground of "extreme cruelty". Daniel and his siblings grew up destitute, having been raised by a single mother and family on welfare who had been abandoned. Daniel's older brother, Mike, would say in 2015 after the death of their father, "unfortunately, he was only a sperm donor and nothing more". In the first 20 years of their lives, the Parker children would see their biological father twice, on each occasion for just a few hours.

Parker's mother would remarry three times, first in a short-lived 1967 marriage to Harold Schiele—a Ronan, Montana, carpenter—and followed that unsuccessful union by tying the knot in 1969 with Leo Arbuckle, a logger from Coram, Montana. Her final marriage came in 1975 to Herbert "Sonny" Strong, a used car salesman—son of the noted golf course architect Herbert B. Strong—who had moved to Kalispell in 1971 from Fort Pierce, Florida. Strong, who was a hunting enthusiast, taught Daniel the fundamentals of deer and elk hunting, an activity he would continue to enjoy.

In 1975, during school summer vacation, Daniel took a job as an apprentice carpenter building garages for Bill Williams, a Columbia Falls building contractor. The carpentry work in the summers was steady until Parker graduated from Flathead High School in 1978. He then took up a position as a carpenter working on the power generating station near the coal strip mining operations in Colstrip, Montana. He stayed on the job at the power station until 1980 when he returned to Kalispell.

== Marriage and later life ==
In the winter of 1981 Parker met his future wife, Jeanne Drollinger, at the Blue Moon nightclub in Columbia Falls. They were married on June 2, 1982, and three children were born to the couple, son Joshua and daughters Shannon and Lindsey. As a couple, the Parkers are engaged as a hobby in riding, and to a lesser extent raising, horses and mules. Daniel, when he finds time in the fall, enjoys elk hunting with bow and arrow and is an ardent supporter of the Rocky Mountain Elk Foundation. Parker and his wife, the daughter of a preacher, attend church on a regular basis.

Parker maintains a busy show schedule, attending the Safari Club International show in Nevada annually. His most important art show each year is the annual C. M. Russell Art Show, now called "The Russell", in Great Falls, Montana, held in March. In addition to scheduled shows, he often takes on commissioned projects as well.

== Sculpting career ==
The Lookout, a bronze bighorn sheep sculpture by Parker

Midnight Serenade, a bronze gray wolf sculpture by Parker

=== Early career ===
By virtue of his natural abilities and dogged, unrelenting self-determination, Parker taught himself how to sculpt and paint, although he didn't take up painting seriously until he was in his late 40s when he got a few informal personal painting lessons from his friend Don Oelze, a New Zealand-born master painter of Native American genre subjects. Parker was inspired in his pursuit of a career in art by witnessing the successful careers of fellow Kalispell artists Ace Powell, Frank Hagel, Mark Ogle, and others.

Parker was an average student in school, generally receiving "C" grades, but he always excelled in art, his favorite subject. While attending an art class in 1977 at Flathead High School taught by Frank DiVita, who in his spare time from teaching was an accomplished bird sculptor, Parker received encouragement from DiVita who suggested that he try his hand at sculpture. The suggestion was taken up by Parker who produced his first sculpture, a fired clay bighorn sheep. It was a miniature statue cast in pewter, only about three inches long and an inch high, but the nascent start would later blossom into a successful career as a wildlife sculptor.

In 1983, Parker began to sculpt his first series of sculptures for public sale. The edition, which he called the "North American Collection", included sculptures of twelve different North American big game animals. At first he hired the Kalispell Art Casting Foundry to cast his work in bronze. By 1989, however, Parker had set up his own foundry so that the casting and patina process could be more carefully monitored. His bronze sculptures have all been cast using the lost wax method and the foundry is still in operation today.

=== Artistic style ===
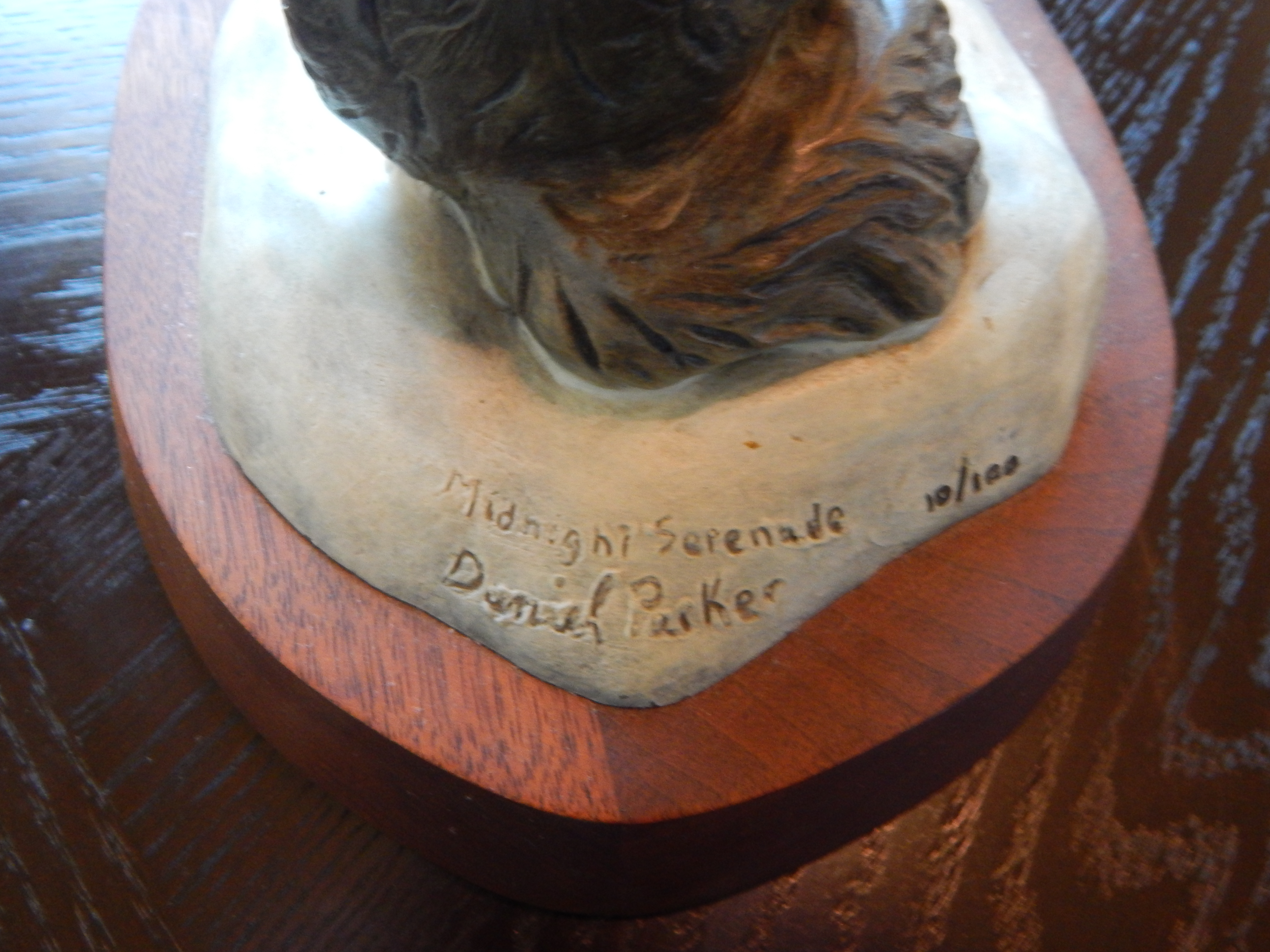
Signature example for Parker

Parker's sculpting style can best be described as "realism" in the sense that he wants his finished product to look exactly like the wild animal would appear in its natural environment. His sculptures convey the animals' natural stances and movements, never appearing frozen unless that is his specific intent as in the case of a deer, for example, standing still. In essence, Parker is a modern-day animalier sculptor. His sculptures always feature close attention to proper anatomical detail.

=== Success with Members Only ===
In 1997 Parker created what has proven to be his most successful sculpture, a 49-piece limited edition table sculpture called Members Only which is now sold out. The sculpture features three Kodiak grizzly bears fishing for salmon. An oval-shaped glass top represents the surface of the water in which the bears are catching salmon.

The Members Only sculpture won the 1997 Ralph "Tuffy" Berg Award at the C. M. Russell Art Show (now known as "The Russell") in Great Falls, Montana, given to the best new artist of the year.

== Patrons ==
=== Jack Nicklaus ===
In 1998, Jack Nicklaus and his wife Barbara purchased Parker's Members Only grizzly bear sculpture which had been for sale in the Western Wildlife Gallery in San Francisco. Later, in 2003, Nicklaus would add another bronze sculpture by Parker called Elk Horn Mountain to his collection.

=== Robert A. Funk ===
While on a hunting trip in 1989 at Taylor Ranch in Colorado, Parker met Oklahoma City businessman Robert A. Funk. After Funk discovered that Parker was a wildlife artist, he asked Parker if he had any examples of his work to show him. It just so happened that the artist had an elk bust sculpture called Perfection in his truck and, after showing it to Funk, a sale was consummated on the spot for the sculpture. Parker would meet Funk again at the C. M. Russell Art Show in 1999 and some years later he suggested to Funk that he could design a sculpture of a Clydesdale horse to be given as an award to exemplary employees of Funk's Express Employment Professionals company in Oklahoma City. A deal was struck between the two that resulted in Parker casting a now sold out 50-piece edition called Express Ranch Clydesdale. Over time, Funk has added several more Parker sculptures to his collection, including a monumental bronze elk sculpture for the entrance to his New Mexico ranch.

=== Meredith Hodges ===
Parker was hired in 2024 by Meredith Hodges, the adopted daughter of cartoonist Charles M. Schulz, on a $950,000 contract to produce a life-size bronze sculpture of a mule pack train. Hodges intends to display the piece in her Colorado museum. She also contracted Parker to make a life-size mule head maquette in bronze.

== Monumental sculptures ==
Parker in 2008 standing near his Something's Coming grizzly bear sculpture in clay

Parker has created a number of monumental sculptures, the most notable being Yellowstone Legacy and Black Mesa Mulies. The Yellowstone Legacy sculpture was purchased by The Hibernation Station motel in West Yellowstone, Montana. Black Mesa Mulies—purchased by NatureWorks, Inc., a Tulsa organization which promotes wildlife conservation and education—is displayed in River Parks, adjacent the Arkansas River in Tulsa, Oklahoma, where a number of other bronze wildlife sculptures are also on display along the River Park Trail, including one by fellow Montana sculptor Sherry Sander.

=== Dispute with the City of Kalispell ===
In 2007, Parker entered into a contract with the City of Kalispell to produce and deliver a monumental bronze grizzly bear sculpture, called Something's Coming, to be placed at the intersection of Highway 93 and Highway 2. The contract was for $101,000 of which an initial payment of $10,000 was made. In addition to the main sculpture, Parker was to deliver 30 smaller maquette sculptures. He created the bear statue in clay, but it was never cast in bronze and delivered to the City of Kalispell due to a contract dispute.

Parker filed suit in District Court in July 2011 claiming breach of contract. Eventually, in May 2013, a settlement agreement was reached whereby Parker reimbursed the City of Kalispell $5,000 of their initial down payment. Jane Howington, who was the Kalispell City Manager in November 2010, said of the sculpture contract with Parker, "using that type of money for that type of discretionary thing is not, in my view, appropriate." The City of Kalispell took the position that an art project of this type should not be funded with taxpayer dollars. Howington stated that she generally supported public art but believed putting a large statue at the corners of an intersection could be a safety hazard, blocking the views of drivers.

== Awards ==
(Sources)

- 1997 Ralph "Tuffy" Berg Award at the C. M. Russell Art Show (now known as "The Russell") in Great Falls, Montana, for the best new artist of the year.
- 1998 People's Choice Best Sculpture Award at the C. M. Russell Art Show for the table sculpture Brooks Falls.
- 1998 People's Choice Award at the Bennington Center for the Arts in Bennington, Vermont, for the table sculpture The Watcher.
- 1998 Best Sculpture Award at the Wild Wings Art Show in Lake City, Minnesota, for the sculpture Southfork Crossing.
- 1999 Sculpture Artist of the Year Award from the Rocky Mountain Elk Foundation.
- 1999 People's Choice Best Sculpture Award at the C. M. Russell Art Show.
- 1999 Artist Award at the Bennington Center for the Arts, Bennington, Vermont, for the elephant table sculpture Sweet Talk.
- 2000 Viewer's Favorite Award at the Great Plains Show at the Museum of Nebraska Art.
- 2004 People's Choice Best Sculpture Award at the C. M. Russell Art Show for the bear table sculpture Grizzly Falls.
- 2008 Best of Show (New Artist) at the Calgary Stampede Western Art Sales Salon.
