= Napa State Hospital =

- California Department of State Hospitals
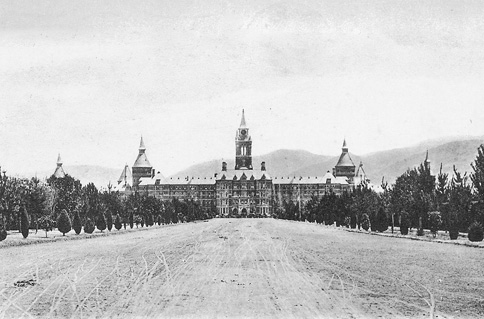
- Original Kirkbride building, c. 1900

Geography
- Location: Napa, Napa Valley, Napa County, California, United States
- Coordinates: 38°16′41″N 122°16′01″W

History
- Founded: 1875

Links
- Website: Official website
- Lists: Hospitals in California

Napa State Hospital is a psychiatric hospital in Napa, California, founded in 1875. It is located along California State Route 221, the Napa-Vallejo Highway, and is one of California's five state mental hospitals. Napa State Hospital holds civil and forensic mental patients in a sprawling 138-acre campus. According to a hospital spokesperson, there were 2,338 people employed at the facility during the 2016 to 2017 fiscal year, making it one of the region's largest employers.

== History ==
The property was originally part of Rancho Tulucay, a part of a Mexican Land Grant, sold by Cayetano Juárez to the State of California in 1872.

Originally named Napa Insane Asylum, the facility opened on November 15, 1875. It sat on 192 acres (0.8 square kilometers) of property stretching from the Napa River to what is now Skyline Park. The facility was originally built to relieve overcrowding at Stockton Asylum. By the early 1890s, the facility had over 1,300 patients which was more than double the original capacity it was designed to house. In 1893, the Mendocino State Hospital was opened and relieved some of the overcrowding at the Napa hospital.

The original main building known as "the Castle" was an ornate and imposing building constructed with bricks. Facilities on the property included a large farm that included dairy and poultry ranches, vegetable garden, and fruit orchards that provided a large part of the food supply consumed by the residents. The castle's main building was torn down after World War II.

This hospital was one of the many state asylums that had sterilization centers. Approximately 4,000 former patients are buried in a field at this hospital, and about 1,400 people were buried at the Sonoma Regional Center (now North Bay Regional Center).

== Notable patients ==
- Edward Charles Allaway – mass murderer; transferred to Napa in 2016
- Sara Kathryn Arledge, artist and filmmaker, forcibly committed by her husband Clyde Smith in 1956
- Charles J. Beerstecher, politician suffering from dropsy
- Richard Allen Davis – murderer and career criminal; was sent to Napa after faking a suicide attempt so he could escape in 1976
- Charles E. Huber – businessman; was admitted after increasingly bizarre and violent behavior
- Chol Soo Lee – immigrant accused of murder; was admitted following a suicide attempt while incarcerated in 1966
- Edward J. Livernash – journalist accused of murder; later elected to Congress
- Eddie Machen – boxer; admitted for threatening suicide in 1962
- Earle Nelson – serial killer; was sent to Napa several times and escaped prior to his killings
- Henry Peavey – cook and valet for William Desmond Taylor; was admitted after being diagnosed with syphilis
- Bull Perrine – baseball umpire; was admitted due to failing health and later died in Napa
- William G. Sebold – German U.S. citizen and spy; admitted for manic depression in 1965
- Scott Harlan Thorpe – spree killer; sentenced to Napa
- Clarice Vance – vaudeville personality; died in Napa after being admitted for failing health
- Carleton Watkins – photographer; was admitted by his daughter

== Notable staff ==
- Matilda Allison – educator who taught blind veterans at Napa
- Dorothea Dix – psychiatric reformer
- Frederick W. Hatch – psychiatrist, worked as a second assistant physician
- Meredith Hodges – psychiatric technician
- Thomas Story Kirkbride – physician

== In popular culture ==
- The hospital comes up several times in The 6th Target by James Patterson and Maxine Paetro.
- The Cramps played a free concert to the residents in 1978.

== See also ==
- Eugenics in California
- List of hospitals in California
- Matilda Allison
