= Bull Perrine =

American baseball umpire (1877-1915)

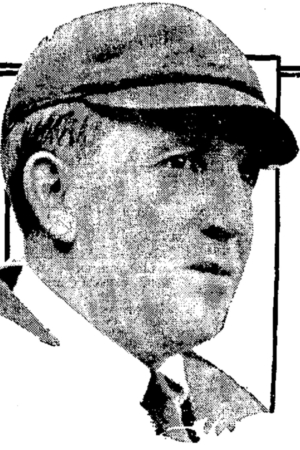
- Bull Perrine, 1909
- Born: Frederick Perrine; 1877; Oakland, California, U.S.
- Died: June 5, 1915 (aged 38); Napa, California, U.S.
- Occupation: Umpire
- Years active: 1909–1912
- Employer: American League

Frederick "Bull" Perrine (1877 – June 5, 1915) was an American professional baseball umpire who worked in the American League from 1909 to 1912. Perrine umpired 507 major league games in his four-year career. He was the home plate umpire on April 20, 1910, when Addie Joss threw a no-hitter. Upon his retirement following an illness, league president Ban Johnson described Perrine as the league's best umpire.

== Playing career ==
Perrine was a pitcher in minor league baseball prior to his umpiring days, though records are sparse. With the Seattle Siwashes in the independent Pacific Coast League in 1903, he is recorded as pitching in one game and giving up four earned runs over five innings in a losing effort. He played with San Francisco and Oakland of the independent California State League in 1904.

When he entered umpiring in 1905, an article in Sporting Life said that Perrine "has never played ball in the East, but is pretty generally known from British Columbia to Old Mexico as a ball tosser. He played one year in Honolulu in the Sugarcane League."

== Umpiring career ==
In 1905, Perrine took a job as a Pacific Coast League umpire. In that first year, he was assaulted on the field twice within two weeks. On April 16, he was kicked in the breast by a player named Flood of the Los Angeles Looloos. Perrine angered the 4,000 spectators when he ended the game a short time later. However, the game was called not because of Flood's behavior, but because players needed to catch a 5:00 pm train. Exactly two weeks later, he was attacked on the field again. This time he received cuts when a player began punching him; the player was subdued by police. San Francisco's Marty Murphy was arrested and thrown out of the league for the incident; Perrine was able to dress his wounds and he continued working the game.

Perrine was promoted to the American League in 1909. After working a Philadelphia-Boston doubleheader in his rookie season with partner Silk O'Loughlin, Perrine received a police escort off the field. Boston fans were enraged by several decisions that went against the team.

== Notable games ==
=== 1910 ===
In his second year in the major leagues, Perrine called balls and strikes for a no-hit game thrown by Addie Joss in 1910. In that same year, he umpired in Cy Young's 500th career win in the second game of a doubleheader.

=== 1912 ===
Perrine umpired the first game played at Navin Field, later known as Tiger Stadium, on April 20, 1912. In the eleven-inning contest, the Tigers and pitcher George Mullin defeated the Naps 6–5.

Less than a month later, Perrine worked in the Detroit-Philadelphia game that featured a full team of replacement players for Detroit. Ty Cobb had been suspended for severely beating a disabled heckler. When Perrine enforced the suspension and stopped Cobb from taking the field, the entire team walked off the field with Cobb in protest. Tigers management had several locals on standby for this possibility, including college student and future Catholic priest Al Travers. In a complete eight innings of pitching, Travers gave up 24 runs on 26 hits, including six triples.

== Illness ==
Perrine suffered a sunstroke during a game early in the 1912 season. In July 1912, it was reported that Perrine "broke down completely" the month before and that he had been in poor health all season. He sought relief at several springs in the east. When these were unsuccessful, he came home. Though the report describes Perrine as on his way to New York to resume umpiring duties, he never appeared in another game. By late August 1912, Perrine was reported to be unlikely to ever return to umpiring, as he was suffering from inflammatory rheumatism requiring a cane. In February 1913, American League club owners voted unanimously to provide monetary assistance to Perrine, who was said to be facing blindness.

On the affidavit of his sister Margaret in September 1913, Perrine was held for a week of observation at an emergency receiving hospital and then sent to the Napa State Hospital. Upon his commitment, he was described as a "hopeless" case of locomotor ataxia. Perrine was said to be "too violent when taken into court", so the emergency commitment evaluation was held in the hospital.

== Death ==
Perrine died on June 5, 1915, at Napa State Hospital, where he had resided for more than a year. He was 38 years old.

== See also ==
- List of Major League Baseball umpires (disambiguation)
