= Harry Geisel =

American baseball umpire (1888–1966)

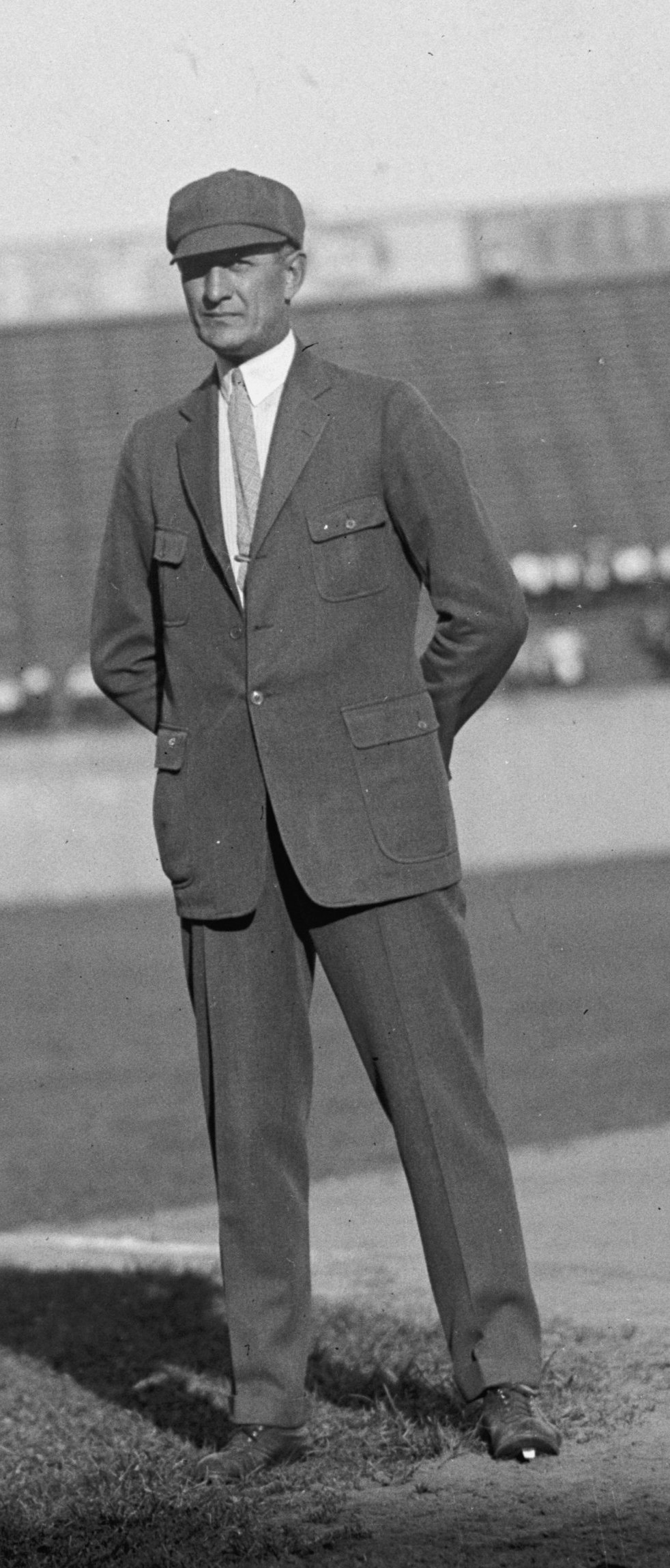
- Geisel in 1925
- Born: Harry Christian Geisel; July 10, 1888; Indianapolis, Indiana, U.S.
- Died: February 19, 1966 (aged 77); Franklin, Indiana, U.S.
- Occupation: Umpire
- Years active: 1925–1942
- Employer: American League
- Spouse: Alice Collins

Harry Christian Geisel (July 10, 1888 – February 19, 1966) was an American Major League Baseball umpire who worked in the American League for 18 years from 1925 to 1942. Geisel umpired in three World Series (1930, 1934, and 1936) and in two All-Star Games (1935 and 1938. In his career, he umpired 2,554 Major League games.

== Notable games ==
In 1932, Geisel was the home plate umpire when Lou Gehrig became the first modern major league player to hit four home runs in a single game.

Geisel worked the 1934 World Series game in which angry Detroit fans threw bottles and vegetables in protest of an aggressive slide by Joe Medwick of St. Louis.

Geisel worked with future Hall of Fame umpire Jocko Conlan in Conlan's 1935 debut as an umpire. Geisel's partner had been overcome by heat that day. Conlan, then an aging player with the Chicago White Sox, volunteered to fill in as an umpire since he was unable to play due to a thumb injury.

He worked the plate for the only opening day no-hitter in MLB history on April 16, 1940, thrown by Bob Feller against the Chicago White Sox.

In 1942, Geisel collided with Yankees hurler Spud Chandler. The resulting injuries led to Geisel's retirement after a seven-week hospitalization.

== Involvement in other sports ==
During the baseball offseason, Geisel served as an announcer for boxing prize fights.

Following his umpiring career, Geisel became athletic director at the Indiana Boys School. He died in 1966 in an Indiana hospital at the age of 75.

Geisel is the great-uncle of Paul Page, the radio voice of the Indianapolis 500.

== See also ==
- List of Major League Baseball umpires (disambiguation)
