= 2009 in comics =

Notable events of 2009 in comics.

== Events ==
=== January ===
- January 1: The direct-to-DVD film Hulk Vs is released.
- January 6: The third and final volume of Hollow Fields has been released.
- January 15: Dutch cartoonist Tom Janssen wins his second Inktspotprijs for Best Political Cartoon.
- January 28: The Dutch comics magazine Eppo returns to the market, after being discontinued for a decade. It manages to remain in print, as of today.

=== February ===
- February 4: British TV host Jonathan Ross donates a rare Spider-Man comic book (Amazing Fantasy nr. 15) to the charity event Comic Relief.
- The Ultimate Marvel titles Ultimate X-Men and Ultimate Fantastic Four are both cancelled at milestones: Ultimate X-Men's series finale ends issue #100, while Ultimate Fantastic Four's ends at issue #60.
- To celebrate the inauguration of Barack Obama, Amazing Spider-Man #583 presented an all-new story teaming up President Obama and Spider-Man in "Spidey Meets the President!" The title featured five variant covers.

=== April ===
- April 13: Homestuck, the largest and most popular of Andrew Hussie's webcomics, was released
- April 19: In Boechout, Belgium, a memorial plaque is attached to the former house of comic author George Van Raemdonck. A local park and street are renamed after him, with a sculpture of him and his characters Bulletje en Boonestaak inaugurated in the park.
- April 26: Suske en Wiske receive a comics mural near the station of Kalmthout, Belgium.
- In honor of Wolverine's 35th anniversary, Marvel Comics announced that numerous Marvel titles would feature Wolverine Art Appreciation Variant covers in April 2009. Styles will be reminiscent of Pablo Picasso, Salvador Dalí, Andy Warhol. The first issues to feature a Wolverine Art Appreciation variant cover were Captain Britain and MI13 #12, Amazing Spider-man #590, Hulk #11, Uncanny X-Men #508, and Secret Warriors #3.
- "Whatever Happened to the Caped Crusader?" was a 2009 story featuring the DC Comics character of Batman. The story was published in two parts, in the "final" issues of the series Batman (#686) and Detective Comics (#853), released February and April respectively. Written by Neil Gaiman, pencilled by Andy Kubert, and inked by Scott Williams, the story was purported to be the "last" Batman story in the wake of severe psychological trauma that Batman endures within the Batman R.I.P. story, and his ultimate fate in Final Crisis.
- The 40th and final Sammy album is published. Author Jean-Pol announces his retirement and the end of the series.

=== May ===
- May 1: X-Men Origins: Wolverine was released in theaters.
- May 19: The final issue of the relaunched version of the German comics magazine Fix und Foxi is published.

=== June ===
- June 2: In Louvain-la-Neuve, Belgium, the Hergé Museum opens its doors.
- June 18: In the Zandstraat/Rue de Sable in Brussels, Belgium, the Marc Sleen Museum opens its doors, the first museum dedicated to a Belgian comics artist while the artist in question, Marc Sleen, is still alive. King Albert II of Belgium officially opens the building.

=== August ===
- August 30: A statue of Mafalda is placed on the Plaza Mafalda (named in 2005) in Buenos Aires.
- August 31: The Walt Disney Company buys Marvel Comics.
- Textbook publisher Flat World Knowledge publishes a business-themed graphic novel, Atlas Black: Managing to Succeed.

=== September ===
- September: The first episode of Hajime Isayama's Attack on Titan is serialized in Bessatsu Shōnen Magazine.
- September 9: It was announced that Paul Levitz would step down as president and Publisher of DC Comics to serve as the Contributing Editor and Overall Consultant for the newly formed DC Entertainment and Diane Nelson would serve as President of the new division.
- September 11: The lifeless body of Japanese manga artist Yoshito Usui (best known for the series Crayon Shin-chan) is found at the bottom of a cliff. He was only 51.
- September 26–27: During the Stripdagen Barbara Stok is the first female comics artist to win the Stripschapprijs. Hanco Kolk, Jean-Marc van Tol and Dutch Minister of Education Ronald Plasterk win the P. Hans Frankfurtherprijs. Ed van Schuijlenburg wins the Bulletje en Boonestaakschaal.

=== October ===
- October 7: Haunt, an ongoing series created by Todd McFarlane and Robert Kirkman, was launched by Image Comics. The book is written by Kirkman with layouts done by Greg Capullo, pencils by Ryan Ottley, and inks by McFarlane.
- October 15: Albert Uderzo is named doctor honoris causa by the University of Paris.

=== Specific date unknown ===
- Iván and Andrés Ramírez Ortiz establish the alternative Costa Rican comics magazine Revista Fotocopia, which will run under the name Ultracomics from August 2010 on and eventually bring out its final issue in 2014.

== Deaths ==
=== January ===
- January 12: Susanne Wenger, Austrian illustrator and comics artist (worked for Unsere Zeitung), dies at age 93.
- January 21: Claude Moliterni, French comics writer (Scarlett Dream), critic and historian and co-founder of the Angoulême International Comics Festival, dies at age 76.

=== February ===
- February 13: Corky Trinidad, Filipino-American comics artist (Nguyen Charlie), dies from pancreatic cancer at age 69.
- February 20: Joan Marti Aragonés, a.k.a. Petronius, Spanish painter and comics artist (made various romance comics for Selecciones Ilustradas, Roxy, Valentine and Marilyn), dies at age 72.

=== March ===
- March 4: Jacques Lemaire, A.K.A. Jacques Lem, French sports cartoonist and comics artist (A Poings Nus, Arbalète, Reporter, Patty Rédacteur Sportif), dies at age 83.
- March 8: Mike Van Audenhove, American-Swiss comics artist (Koch Comix, Zürich by Mike), dies at age 51.
- March 31: Juan Bernet Toledano, Spanish comics artist (Altamiro de la Cueva) dies at age 84.

=== May ===
- May 1: Ric Estrada, Cuban-American comics artist (worked for DC Comics), dies at age 81 from prostate cancer.
- May 9: Peter Scherpenisse, Dutch comic artist (Job Jubel), dies at age 82.
- May 21: Giorgio Bellavitis, Italian comics artist and illustrator, dies at age 72 or 73.
- May 26: Ding Cong, Xiao Ding, Chinese illustrator, cartoonist and comics artist, dies at age 93.

=== April ===
- April 2: Frank Springer, American comic artist (The Adventures of Phoebe Zeit-Geist, worked for Marvel Comics), dies at age 79 from prostate cancer.
- April 3: Harry Schlegel, German comics artist (Kapitäns Jonathan Pappendick, Pedro und Coco, Pats Reiseabenteuer Max und Maxi), dies at age 78 or 79.
- April 4: Fritzi Harmsen van Beek, Dutch comics artist (continued Flipje van Tiel), dies at age 81.
- April 23: Jaap van der Pol, a.k.a. Larry Oblomov, Dutch photographer, painter, illustrator, collage artist, teacher and comics artist (Het Schoolarchief), dies at age 70.
- April 24: José Miguel Heredia, Argentine comics artist (Perro Mundo, El Doctor Vudú, El Cuaderno Rojo, Ferranio), dies at age 75.

=== May ===
- May 2: Eugenio Benni, A.K.A. Anthony Benny, Italian comics artist (Gallix, Angelica, Teodora, Alcina La Maga, continued Capitaine Miki, Il Grande Blek, drew Italian versions of The Phantom), dies at age 70.

=== June ===
- June 9: Dave Simons, American comics artist and animator (worked for Marvel and DC Comics), dies at age 54.
- June 19: Piet Tibos, Belgian comics artist and cartoonist (De Avonturen van Sebedeus en zijn Ploeg), dies at age 78.

=== July ===
- July 3: Martin Vaughn-James, British painter, illustrator and comics artist (Elephant, The Projector, The Park, The Cage), dies at age 65.
- July 6:
  - Alfons Figueras, Spanish animator and comics artist (Aspirino y Colodión or Topolino, el último héroe, worked on Rabatino y Cebollita), dies at age 86.
  - Robert L. Short, American religious leader and writer (The Gospel According to Peanuts), dies at age 86 or 87.
- July 21: Heinz Edelmann, German graphic designer, illustrator, animator, cartoonist and comics artist (Yellow Submarine), dies from heart disease at age 75.
- July 22: John Ryan, British comics artist and animator (Harris Tweed, Extra Special Agent, Captain Pugwash), dies at age 88.
- July 25: Francisco Hidalgo, a.k.a. Yves Roy, Spanish comics artist (Doctor Nieblba, Dick Tober, Angel Audaz, Blason d'Argent, Bob Mallard, Teddy Ted) and photographer, dies at age 80.

=== August ===
- August 9: Frank Borth, American comics artist and writer (Ken Stuart, wrote There Oughta Be a Law!, worked for Cracked) dies at age 91.
- August 13: Josette Baujot, Belgian comics artist and colorist (Adventures of Tintin) and wife of Jo-El Azara, dies at age 88.
- August 15: Matej Nemecek, Czech comics artist, dies at age 28.

=== September ===
- September 11: Yoshito Usui, Japanese manga artist (Crayon Shin-chan), dies at age 51.
- September 14: Roy Raymonde, British editorial cartoonist and comic artist (Lil, Patsy & John, Them, Boffins at Bay, Raymonde's Rancid Rhymes, Raymonde's Blooming Wonders, Mr. Meddle, Doc Brief), dies at age 79.
- September 24: Frits Godhelp, Dutch comic artist (Bas en Van der Pluim, worked for the Marten Toonder Studios, Disney comics), dies at age 82.
- September 25: Jean Vermeire, a.k.a. Jiv, Belgian comics artist and illustrator (Les Aventures de M. Ding, Les Aventures de Bob), dies at age 88.
- September 26: Carlos Roume, Argentine comics artist, dies at age 85 or 86.
- September 29: Rusty Haller, American comics artist (Hanna-Barbera comics, Looney Tunes comics), dies at age 55.

=== October ===
- October 4: Ricardo Garijo, Argentinian comics artist, writer and publisher (founder of the magazine Gurbos, wrote for Commando Comics) dies at age 55.
- October 12: Joe Rosen, American comics letterer (worked for Marvel Comics and DC Comics), dies at age 88.
- October 15: George Tuska, American comics artist (worked on Scorchy Smith, Buck Rogers in the 25th Century, Captain Marvel and Iron Man. Created The World's Greatest Superheroes), dies at age 93.
- October 20:
  - Attila Dargay, Hungarian animator and comics artist (Kajla), dies at age 82.
  - Jef Nys, Belgian comics artist (Jommeke, Met Langteen en Schommelbuik Voorwaarts), dies at age 82.
- October 21:
  - Robert Dalmasso, a.k.a. Robert Devil, French comics artist (made comics for Éditions Presses Mondiales), dies at age 78 or 79.
  - Vernon Henkel, American comics writer and artist (worked for DC Comics, Harvey Comics and Marvel Comics), dies at age 91.
- October 23: Michel Motti, French comics artist (Le Petit Roi Ibello, Nicolas et Nicolette, Disney comics, continued Pif le chien and Placid et Muzo), dies at age 74.
- October 26: Fred McCarthy, creator of Brother Juniper, the only religious-themed comic ever syndicated in daily newspapers internationally, dies at age 91.

=== November ===
- November 3: Shel Dorf, American comics letterer (Steve Canyon) and founder of San Diego Comic-Con, dies at age 76.
- November 9: Bill Jaaska, American comics artist (continued New Titans and The Incredible Hulk), dies at age 48.
- November 13: François Bel, French comics artist (Phil et Jori, Miss Justine, Sidonie Fleurdepois, Zophyta), dies at age 82.
- November 23: Sonny Trinidad, Filipino comics artist (El Gato, Inday sa Balitaw) dies.
- November 27: Irving Tripp, American comics artist (continued Little Lulu and Nancy, Disney comics, Looney Tunes comics), dies at age 88 from cancer.

=== December ===
- December 9:
  - Govind Brhamania, Indian comics artist (Bahadur), dies at age 71.
  - Xavier Musquera, a.k.a. Chris, Spanish comics artist (Melly Brown, Peggy Press, Monsieu Wens, Angie, Miss Blondie), dies at age 66.
- December 10: Jean-Marie Brouyère, Belgian comics writer (Archie Cash, L'Épervier Bleu), dies at age 66.
- December 14: Minami Keizi, Brazilian novelist and comics artist (Tupãzinho), dies at age 54.
- December 27: Geoffrey Bond, a.k.a. Alan Jason, British comics writer (Luck of the Legion, Claudia of the Circus, Arty and Crafty, Justin Tyme - ye Hapless Highwayman), dies at age 89.
- December: Nel van Beek, a.k.a. Koten, Dutch feminist, poster designer and comics artist (Dol en Mina, Floor Blom), dies at age 75 or 76.

=== Specific date unknown ===
- Wei Qimei, Chinese comics artist, dies at age 84 or 85.

== Exhibitions ==
- May 2–July 12: "Underground Classics: The Transformation of Comics into Comix, 1963-1990" (Chazen Museum of Art, Madison, Wisconsin) — underground comix exhibition curated by James Danky and Denis Kitchen
- June 21–August 31: "Hogarth and Beyond: Global Cartoons from the International Museum of Cartoon Art Collection" (Cartoon Library and Museum reading room and gallery, Ohio State University, Columbus, Ohio)
- June 28–August 7: "From Yellow Kid to Conan: American Cartoons from the International Museum of Cartoon Art Collection" (Hopkins Hall Gallery + Corridor, Cartoon Library and Museum, Ohio State University, Columbus, Ohio)

== Conventions ==
- January 23–25: Phoenix Comicon (Mesa, Arizona) — 7,000 attendees; official guests: David Beaty, Lou Ferrigno, Tiffany Grant, Erin Gray, Matt Greenfield, Reuben Langdon, Yuri Lowenthal, Tara Platt, Christophe Tang, and Wil Wheaton
- January 29–February 1: Angoulême International Comics Festival (Angoulême, France)
- February: Convention du Lac (Lake Charles, Louisiana)
- February 6–8: New York Comic Con (New York City, US)
- February 14–15: Hi-Ex (Inverness, Scotland) — guests included John Higgins, Leah Moore, Mike McMahon, and Frank Quitely
- February 27–March 1: MegaCon (Orange County Convention Center, Orlando, Florida) — 40,000 attendees; guests include Peter S. Beagle, Jim Cheung, Colleen Clinkenbeard, Aaron Dismuke, Lou Ferrigno, Caitlin Glass, Peter Mayhew, Vic Mignogna, George Moss, Paul Pelletier, George Pérez, William Tucci, and Mark Waid
- February 27–March 1: WonderCon (Moscone Center, San Francisco, California)
- March 7: STAPLE! (Monarch Event Center, Austin, Texas)
- March 28: UK Web & Mini Comix Thing (Queen Mary University of London, Mile End, London) — guests include Richard Stevens, Meredith Gran, Sarah McIntyre, Woodrow Phoenix, and James Turner
- April 4: FLUKE Mini-Comics & Zine Festival (Tasty World, Athens, Georgia)
- April 4–5: Emerald City ComiCon (Washington State Convention & Trade Center, Seattle, Washington, US) — 13,000 attendees; guests: Humberto Ramos, Barry Kitson, Darwyn Cooke, Mark Brooks, Joe Casey, Christos Gage, Jimmy Palmiotti, Amanda Conner, Frank Cho, Stuart Immonen, Adam Hughes, Steve Niles, Joseph Michael Linsner, Adi Granov, Mark Waid, Matt Fraction, Stan Sakai, Tony Harris, Brian Michael Bendis, Becky Cloonan, Vasilis Losos, James Kochalka, David Peterson, Paul Smith, Patrick Gleason, Mark Texeira, Brian Denham, Joe Jusko, Stephen Silver, Rick Remender, Gene Ha, Mike Huddleson, and Tim Sale
- April 18–19: Small Press and Alternative Comics Expo (S.P.A.C.E.) (Aladdin Shrine Center, Columbus, Ohio)
- April 18–19: Stumptown Comics Fest (Double Tree Convention Hall, Portland, Oregon) — guest of honor: Craig Thompson
- April 18–19: Toronto ComiCON Fan Appreciation Event (Metro Toronto Convention Centre, Toronto, Ontario, Canada)
- May 9–10: Bristol Comic Expo (Ramada and Mercure hotels, Bristol, UK) — guests include Dan DiDio and Bob Wayne
- May 9–10: Toronto Comic Arts Festival (Toronto Reference Library, Toronto, Canada)
- May 15–17: Motor City Comic Con (Rock Financial Showplace, Novi, Michigan, US) — guests include Art Baltazar, Dwayne McDuffie, Guy Davis, Carrie Fisher, John Schneider, Aaron Douglas, Michael Hogan, Kristy Swanson, Julie Newmar, Doug Jones, Catherine Bach, Garrett Wang, and Joyce DeWitt
- May 15–16: East Coast Black Age of Comics Convention (Free Library and Crowne Plaza Hotel, Philadelphia, Pennsylvania) — guests include Kevin Grevioux, Jamal Igle, Reggie Byers, Leslie Esdaile Banks, and Eric Battle; presentation of the Glyph Comics Awards
- June 6–7: MoCCA Festival (69th Regiment Armory, New York City, US)
- June 12–14: Adventure Con 2009 — Summer (Knoxville Convention Center, Knoxville, Tennessee, US) — guest of honor: Arthur Suydam
- June 19–21: Heroes Convention (Charlotte Convention Center, Charlotte, North Carolina, US) — guests include Mark Bagley, Liz Baillie, John Beatty, Brian Michael Bendis, Ivan Brandon, Ed Brubaker, Cliff Chiang, Jeremy Dale, Guy Davis, Vito Delsante, Colleen Doran, Nathan Edmondson, Matt Fraction, Bryan J. L. Glass, Michael Golden, Adam Hughes, Jamal Igle, Bob McLeod, Carla Speed McNeil, Steve McNiven, Chris Moreno, Jim Ottaviani, George Pérez, David Petersen, Don Rosa, Jeff Smith, Ben Templesmith, Loston Wallace, and Daniel Way
- July 18–19: London Film and Comic Con (Earls Court Exhibition Centre, London, England, UK)
- July 23–26: San Diego Comic-Con (San Diego, California, US) — 126,000 attendees; guests include Forrest J. Ackerman, Sergio Aragonés, Kyle Baker, Ralph Bakshi, Mike W. Barr, Lynda Barry, Frank Beddor, Ray Bradbury, Steve Breen, Max Brooks, Ed Brubaker, Matt Busch, Jim Butcher, Eddie Campbell, Howard Chaykin, Kim Deitch, Mark Evanier, Al Feldstein, Keith Giffen, Neil Googe, Victor Gorelick, Mike Grell, Paul Gulacy, Joe Hill, Bryan Hitch, John Howe, Al Jaffee, Geoff Johns, J. G. Jones, Todd Klein, Dean Koontz, Tite Kubo, Verne Langdon, Jim Lee, Rutu Modan, Noel Neill, Floyd Norman, Jim Ottaviani, Mike Peters, Wendy Pini, Steve Purcell, Robert J. Sawyer, James Shoop, Jim Starlin, Joe Staton, J. Michael Straczynski, Adrian Tomine, Ethan Van Sciver, James Warren, Jeff Watts, Signe Wilkinson, Bill Willingham, Connie Willis, Jim Woodring, Bernie Wrightson, Dean Yeagle, Neil Patrick Harris, and more
- August 6–9: Wizard World Chicago (Rosemont, Illinois, US)
- August 15–16: "CAPTION is Away with the Fairies" (East Oxford Community Centre, Oxford, England, UK)
- August 15–16: Dallas Comic Con 13 (Richardson Civic Center, Richardson, Texas) — guests include Paul Smith, Steve Niles, Bill Sienkiewicz, J. Scott Campbell, Cal Slayton, and many more
- August 22–23: "miniMegaCon" (Orlando, Florida) — guests include Buffy the Vampire Slayer actors Charisma Carpenter, Emma Caulfield, Amber Benson, and Adam Busch
- August 28–30: Fan Expo Canada (Metro Toronto Convention Centre, Toronto, Ontario, Canada) — 59,000 attendees; guests include Leonard Nimoy, Bruce Campbell, Linda Hamilton, Thomas Dekker, Avery Brooks, Beau Bridges, Mary McDonnell, Billy Dee Williams, Walter Koenig, James Kyson Lee, Robert Duncan McNeill, Emma Caulfield, Lou Ferrigno, Dave Thomas, Leslie Nielsen, Larry Thomas, J. Michael Straczynski, Roger Corman, Udo Kier, Barbara Steele, James Duval, Max Brooks, Rick Green, Jack Ketchum, Joe Quesada, Chris Bachalo, Mike Deodato Jr., Ethan Van Sciver, Ivan Reis, Terry Dodson, David Finch, Olivier Coipel, Len Wein, Bill Sienkiewicz, Stuart Immonen, Yoshinori Ono, Scott McNeil, Crispin Freeman, Brad Swaile, Colleen Clinkenbeard, Aaron Dismuke, Monica Rial, Derek Stephen Prince, Steve Downes, Victor Lucas, Lil Poison, Scott C. Jones, and surprise guest Tobin Bell
- September 4–7: Dragon Con (Hyatt Regency Atlanta/Marriott Marquis/Atlanta Hilton/Sheraton, Atlanta, Georgia, US) — 30,000+ attendees; guests include William Shatner, Leonard Nimoy, Patrick Stewart, Adam Savage, Terry Gilliam, Malcolm McDowell, Lois McMaster Bujold, Mike Mignola, and Tom Felton
- September 11–13: Pittsburgh Comicon (Monroeville Convention Center, Monroeville, Pennsylvania, US) — 9,000 attendees; guest of honor: Stan Lee; other guests include Beau Smith, Billy Tucci, Khoi Pham, Robyn Moore, Bethany Barbis, Scott James, Sean McKeever, Joe Jusko, Pat Olliffe, Ron Frenz, Brian Pulido, Dawn Best, and Dan Fraga
- September 19–20: Montreal Comiccon (Place Bonaventure, Montreal, Quebec) — 4,000 attendees; guests include Lou Ferrigno, Jeremy Bulloch and The Honky Tonk Man, with Brad Swaile
- September 26–27: Small Press Expo (Bethesda North Marriott Hotel & Conference Center, North Bethesda, Maryland)
- October 3–4: Mid-Ohio Con (Greater Columbus Convention Center, Columbus, Ohio)
- October 9–10: Komikazen (Ravenna, Italy) — guests include Dave McKean (guest of honor), Peter Kuper, Carlos Trillo, Gianluca Costantini, Davide Toffolo, Gianfranco Bettin, and Paul Gravett
- October 10–11: Baltimore Comic-Con (Baltimore Convention Center, Baltimore, Maryland, US)
- October 15–17: International Comic Arts Forum (School of the Art Institute of Chicago, Chicago, Illinois) — guests include Guy Davis, Max, Pere Joan, John Miers, and Sara Varon
- October 16–18: Wizard World Big Apple Comic Con (Pier 94, New York City, US) — first iteration of the show under Wizard Entertainment
- October 17–18 Alternative Press Expo (San Francisco, California, US)
- October 24–25: Adventure Con 2009 — Fall (Pigeon Forge Convention Center, Grand Hotel, Pigeon Forge, Tennessee, US)
- October 31-November 1: Manitoba Comic Con (Winnipeg Convention Centre, Winnipeg, Manitoba, Canada) — guests include Adam West, Julie Newmar, Marv Wolfman, Tommy Castillo, Nigel Sade, Echo Chernik, and Lucie Brouillard
- November 5–26: Comica — London International Comics Festival (Institute of Contemporary Arts, London, England, UK) — organized by Paul Gravett; at various times guests include Apostolos Doxiadis, Marcus de Sautoy, Ben Templesmith, Philip Ridley, Sarah McIntyre, Cameron Stewart, Gerry Finley-Day, Brian Bolland, Dave Gibbons, Phil Clarke, Derek "Bram" Stokes, Eddie Campbell, James Jean, Tara McPherson, Reinhard Kleist, Charles Shaar Murray, Willy Linthout, and Michael Rosen
- November 8: Comica Comiket (ICA Theatre, London, England) — co-sponsored by Alternative Press, We Are Words+Pictures, and Nobrow Press
- November 28: Genghis Con (Beachland Ballroom, Cleveland, Ohio) — first edition of this show, organized by local retailer Scott Rudge and comics creator John G.; guests include Derf Backderf, Mike Gustovich, Gary Dumm, and Greg Budgett

== First issues by title ==
Batman and Robin
Release: June by DC Comics. Writer: Grant Morrison Artists: Frank Quitely, Philip Tan.

Go Beerkada: Rise of the Jhologs
Release: October. Writer and Artist: Lyndon Gregorio

Black Panther Vol. 5
Release: February by Marvel Comics. Writer: Reginald Wudlin Artist: Ken Lashley.

Blood Upon the Rose
Release: by O'Brien Press. Writer and Artist: Gerry Hunt

Cowboy Ninja Viking
Release: August by Shadowline. Writer: A. J. Lieberman Artist: Riley Rossmo

The Flash: Rebirth
Release: March by DC Comics. Writer: Geoff Johns Artist: Ethan Van Sciver.

Blackest Night
Release: Summer by DC Comics. Writer: Geoff Johns Artist: Ivan Reis.

Mysterius: The Unfathomable
Release: March by Wildstorm. Writers: Jeff Parker Artist: Tom Fowler

Push
Release: January by Wildstorm. Writers: Marc Bernardin and Adam Freeman Artist: Bruno Redondo

R.E.B.E.L.S.
Release: February by DC Comics. Writer: Tony Bedard Artists: Andy Clarke, Claude St. Aubin.

Tumor
Release: October by Arcaia Studios Press. Writer: Joshua Hale Fialkov Artist: Noel Tuazon

== See also ==
- List of The New York Times Manga Best Sellers of 2009
