= 2009 in Ireland =

- Centuries: 19th; 20th; 21st
- Decades: 1980s; 1990s; 2000s; 2010s; 2020s
- See also: 2009 in Northern Ireland; Other events of 2009; List of years in Ireland

Events from the year 2009 in Ireland.

Taoiseach Brian Cowen described 2009 as the most challenging of his career in politics.

== Incumbents ==
- President: Mary McAleese
- Taoiseach: Brian Cowen (FF)
- Tánaiste: Mary Coughlan (FF)
- Minister for Finance: Brian Lenihan (FF)
- Chief Justice: John L. Murray
- Dáil: 30th
- Seanad: 23rd

== Events ==
=== January ===
- 1 January – The phase-out of incandescent light bulbs commenced in Ireland.
- 6 January – A priest, Michael Mernagh, completed a nine-day 272 km atonement pilgrimage from Cobh to the Pro-Cathedral in Dublin to repent the Roman Catholic Church's response to clerical child sex abuse.
- 8 January – Post-2008 Irish economic downturn: Dell announced the axing of almost 2,000 jobs at their factory in Limerick, with the total job loss predicted to rise to 10,000 in the region.
- 9 January – The inaugural Art O'Neill Challenge took place, with participants opting to walk or run from Dublin Castle to Glenmalure, starting from midnight and arriving in Glenmalure the day after (10 January).
- 9 January – Confidential documents from Letterkenny General Hospital were revealed to have been discovered in a public area of Derry.
- 11 January – A woman died in childbirth at Kerry General Hospital in Tralee, County Kerry.
- 17 January – A County Down woman was killed in extreme weather when her car was struck by a tree.
- 21 January – Anglo Irish Bank hidden loans controversy: Anglo Irish Bank was nationalised when the President, Mary McAleese, signed the Anglo Irish Bank Corporation Bill 2009.
- 22 January – A County Roscommon woman was jailed for seven years after her conviction for incest, sexual abuse and neglect of her children.
- 30 January – Post-2008 Irish economic downturn: After an announcement that the Waterford Crystal plant at Kilbarry was to shut down, its employees began an unofficial sit-in which led to some scuffles that damaged the main door to the visitors' centre. The sit-in continued until 22 March.

=== February ===
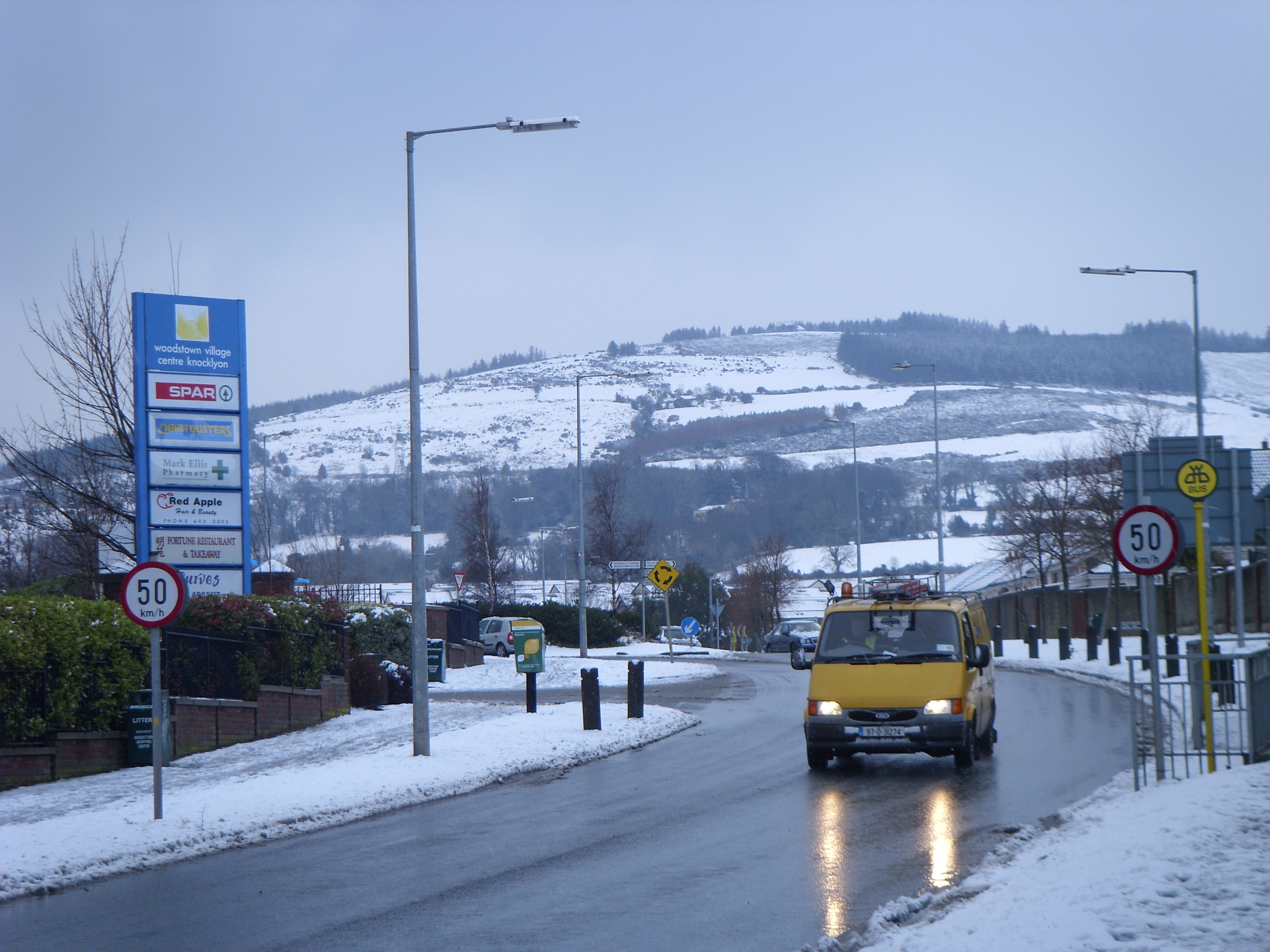
Extreme weather occurred across Ireland in February (Pictured: Ballycullen Road near Tallaght on 3 February).

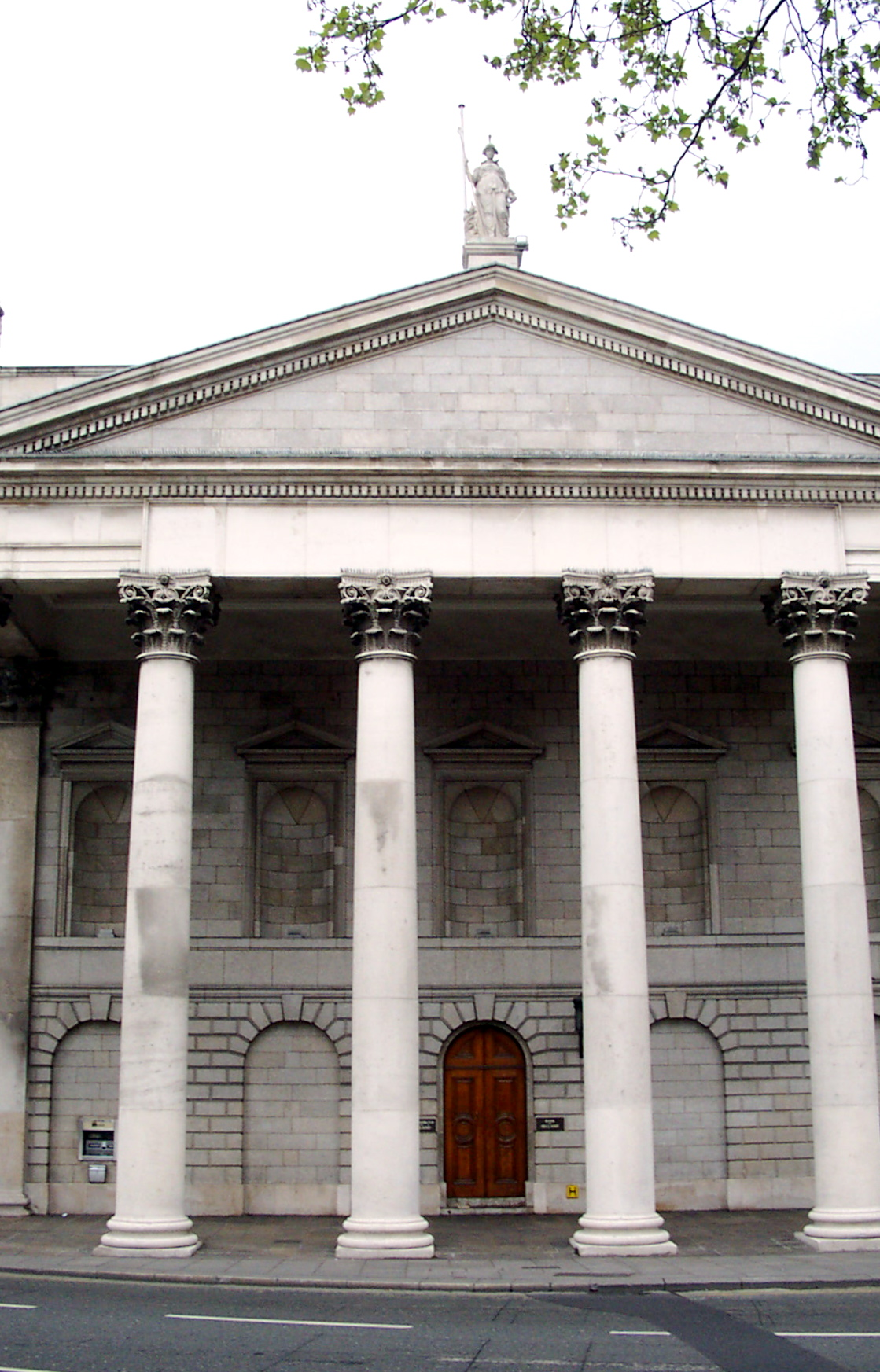
Ireland's largest bank robbery took place at the Bank of Ireland's College Green branch in February.

- 2 February – extreme weather across the country disrupted transport services, including flights, and bus routes.
- 2 February – former Taoiseach Bertie Ahern was blockaded and jostled out of National University of Ireland, Galway by angry students protesting at the reintroduction of fees as he attempted to lecture the Literary and Debating Society.
- 4 February – unemployment reached 9.2 percent with a record 326,100 people signing onto the live register. It was the highest monthly increase in 40 years with an average 1,500 people being laid off daily.
- 4 February – an estimated 15,000 students protested in Dublin at the threatened reintroduction of university fees, blockading government buildings for a time.
- 12 February – a man was arrested after threatening to set fire to himself outside Government Buildings in Dublin.
- 17 February – Irish Nationwide Chairman Michael Walsh resigned over his involvement in the Anglo Irish Bank hidden loans controversy.
- 21 February – up to 120,000 people marched in Dublin in protest at how the Government was handling the economic crisis.
- 24 February – Gardaí raided the headquarters of Anglo Irish Bank in St Stephen's Green, Dublin.
- 25 February – two thousand members of the Garda Síochána marched through the streets of Dublin to protest against a pension levy.
- 25 February – The Irish Times suspended supply of its newspapers to the retailer Dunnes.
- 27 February – the Bank of Ireland robbery took place.

=== March ===
- 2 March – the left door of a helicopter carrying politician Martin Cullen fell off at a height of 150 metres but no-one was hurt.
- 5 March – items belonging to singer Michael Jackson went on view in County Kildare.
- 6 March – the Court of Criminal Appeal dismissed an appeal by Joe O'Reilly against his conviction for the murder of his wife, Rachel Callely, in October 2004.
- 7 March – Dissident Republicans opened fire on British soldiers in County Antrim. Two were killed and two injured while two civilian pizza delivery men, one Polish, were seriously injured. The Real IRA later claim responsibility.
- March – Odyssey Marine Exploration announced the discovery of the wreck of RMS Laconia (1911) (torpedoed 1917) 6 mi (9.7 km) northwest of Fastnet Rock.

=== April ===
- 8 April – the Supplementary Budget was announced by Minister for Finance Brian Lenihan.
- 25 April – an opinion poll showed a five percent drop to 23 percent in support for the governing Fianna Fáil party in the wake of early April's Supplementary Budget. Fine Gael, in opposition, was ten points clear at 33 percent, an increase of two, while the Labour Party, also in opposition, was also up two to 19 percent.
- 27 April – four people were tested after swine flu broke out from Mexico.
- 28 April – tests on all four Irish people with suspected cases of swine flu proved negative.
- 29 April – figures from the Central Statistics Office showed a record 388,600 people on the live register; the figure had almost doubled in one year, rising by 96 percent.
- 30 April – the Department of Health and Children's Chief Medical Officer Tony Holohan confirmed the first probable case of swine flu at a news briefing in Dublin.
- The Coggalbeg hoard, which was dug up in County Roscommon in 1945, and subsequently kept hidden in a safe in Strokestown, was stolen and dumped in a rubbish skip by thieves unaware of its value

=== May ===
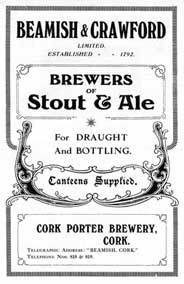
Ireland's oldest brewery in Cork since at least 1650 closed its doors in May. (Pictured: A 1919 advertisement for Beamish Stout)

- 6 May – the chief economics editor of broadcaster, Raidió Teilifís Éireann, George Lee, was named as the Fine Gael party nomination for the Dublin South by-election.
- 11 May – Ryan Tubridy was named as the new presenter of The Late Late Show, replacing Pat Kenny. His first show as presenter was in September 2009.
- 14 May – Ireland failed to progress to the final of the 2009 Eurovision Song Contest. Sinéad Mulvey and Black Daisy's song "Et Cetera" was not one of the ten selected from the second semi-final in Moscow.
- 15 May – a 27-year-old man was shot dead and another man was wounded during a shootout with gardaí during an attempted raid on a cash-in-transit van in Lucan in west Dublin.
- 20 May – the Commission to Inquire into Child Abuse report was published. The long-delayed investigation into Ireland's Roman Catholic-run institutions said that priests and nuns terrorized thousands of boys and girls in workhouse-style schools for decades.
- 25 May – a new stretch of motorway between Fermoy and Mitchelstown in north Cork opened to traffic nine months ahead of schedule.
- 26 May – former Government press secretary Frank Dunlop was sentenced to two years incarceration for corruption, with the final six months suspended. He pleaded guilty to five charges of corruption.
- 29 May – Ireland's oldest brewery in Cork since at least 1650, and home to Beamish and Crawford since 1792, ceased operations.

=== June ===
- 3 June – the Leaving Certificate English Paper 2 was postponed for two days after it emerged that students in one County Louth centre had already seen the exam paper.
- 5 June – the Local and European Parliament elections took place.
- 15 June – mayoral elections were held in several towns and cities.
- 16 June – the body of the man pertaining to the Peter Bergmann case was discovered at Rosses Point beach, County Sligo.

=== July ===
- 1 July – a woman died after falling 20 metres off the Mweelrea mountains in County Mayo.
- 3 July – GOAL charity aid workers Sharon Commins and Hilda Kawuki were abducted from their compound in Darfur.
- 3 July – a child in Roxboro National School in County Roscommon was found to have a case of swine influenza.
- 6 July – the Treaty of Lisbon Bill was published.
- 7 July – a 61-year-old woman was stabbed to death in Castlebar, County Mayo. Her son was charged with her murder the following day.
- 10 July – Ronnie Dunbar was sentenced to life imprisonment for the manslaughter of Melissa Mahon.
- 12 July – the Broadcasting Act changed the spelling of the national broadcaster from Radio Telefís Éireann to Raidió Teilifís Éireann.
- 16 July – the report of the Special Group on Public Service Numbers and Expenditure Programmes, also called An Bord Snip Nua, was published by University College Dublin economist Colm McCarthy. It recommended €5.3 billion in potential savings, including 17,300 public service job cuts and a five percent drop in social welfare.
- 23 July – the Defamation and Criminal Justice (Amendment) Bills became law, after being signed by President Mary McAleese.
- 30 July – draft legislation to establish the National Asset Management Agency was published. The Bill proposed to give NAMA extensive powers to take over land and development loans from banks in an effort to get them lending again and supporting economic recovery.

=== August ===
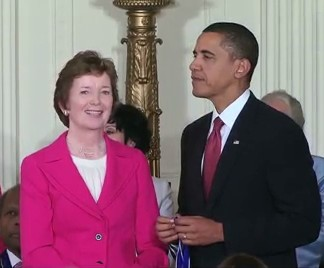
Former President Mary Robinson received the U.S. Presidential Medal of Freedom from U.S. President Barack Obama

- 5 August – a murder investigation was launched after a woman's body was discovered under a tree in Phoenix Park. The woman was later found to be 50-year-old Eugenia Bratis from Timișoara in Romania, who had been in Ireland for several months. Her torso was stabbed several times.
- 12 August – former President Mary Robinson received the United States Presidential Medal of Freedom from Barack Obama at a ceremony in the White House in Washington, D.C., with Obama declaring her to have "not only shown a light on human suffering, but illuminated a better future for our world".
- 21 August – a section of the main Dublin to Belfast railway line collapsed in Malahide in north Dublin. A 20-metre section of viaduct on the Broadmeadow estuary, between Malahide and Donabate gave way. A preliminary assessment carried out on 24 August identified significant erosion of the seabed as a possible reason for the collapse. The viaduct reopened to traffic on 16 November.

=== September ===
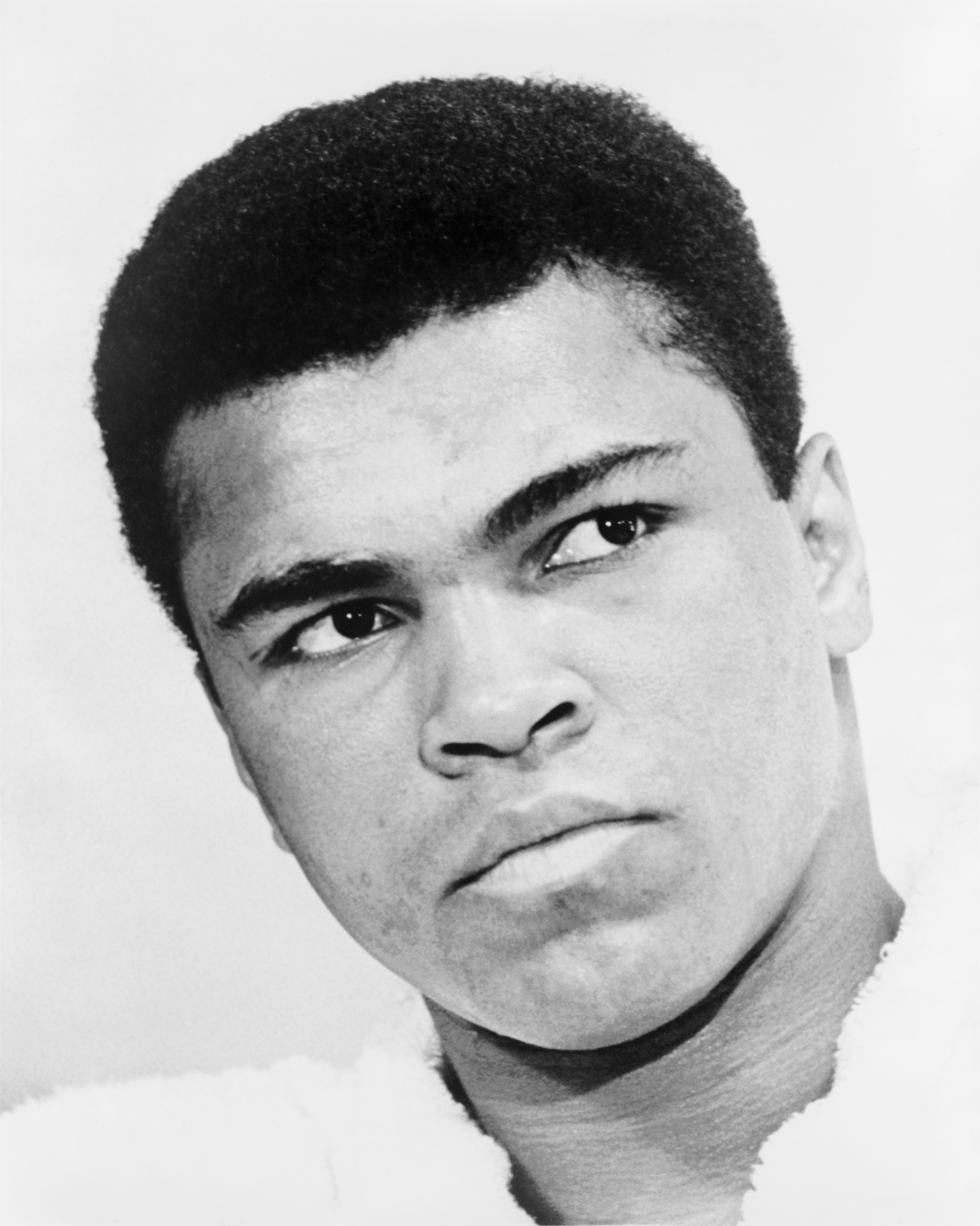
Muhammad Ali visited Ennis in September where he was made the first Honorary Freeman of the town.

- 1 September – at a civic reception, Muhammad Ali was made the first Honorary Freeman of Ennis, the birthplace of his great-grandfather, Abe Grady, who left the town in the 1860s. Ali later sends a letter of thanks to the people of Ennis.
- 5 September – apprentice jockey Jamie Kyne from Claregalway, County Galway was killed in a fire at his flat in Yorkshire, UK.
- 13 September – the Dublinbikes bicycle-sharing system was launched.
- 14 September – Ireland's 2008 Olympic bronze medalist, boxer Darren Sutherland, was found dead in London at the age of 27. Hundreds of people attended his funeral one week later in Navan, County Meath.
- 16 September – 21 people were injured, three seriously, after a collision involving a Luas tram and a double-decker bus on O'Connell Street in Dublin, the worst accident to date involving the Luas service.
- 18–20 September – the three-day Global Irish Economic Forum was held in Farmleigh House in Dublin.
- 20 September – the Government announced their intention to introduce a national postal code system in 2011.
- 21 September – Lisa Cummins and 16-year-old Owen O'Keefe set new records for swimming the English Channel.
- 22 September – Mary McAleese opened the National Ploughing Championships in Athy, County Kildare.
- 27 September – the presence of swine influenza in Irish pigs was confirmed for the first time.
- 30 September – thousands of people protested in Dublin against Colm McCarthy's An Bord Snip Nua proposals.

=== October ===
The second referendum on the Treaty of Lisbon; Ireland voted Yes, Donegal voted No.

- 1 October – the Chairman of FÁS, Peter McLoone, resigned.
- 2 October – the second referendum on the Treaty of Lisbon was held. The treaty was passed with a 67 percent Yes vote. Donegal voted No.
- 10 October – singer Stephen Gately died in an apartment in Mallorca that he shared with his husband, Andrew Cowles. Thousands of people attended the funeral in Dublin one week later, including fans from South Africa and Taiwan.
- 11 October – Michael Sinnott, a priest from Barntown, County Wexford, was abducted in the Philippines. He was held until 11 November, then he arrived in Ireland on 3 December.
- 12 October – two Air Corps pilots were killed when their plane crashed during a training flight in Connemara. They received military funerals.
- 13 October – Séamus Kirk was elected Ceann Comhairle following the resignation of John O'Donoghue over an expenses scandal.
- 18 October – GOAL charity aid workers Sharon Commins and Hilda Kawuki were released after more than one hundred days in captivity in Darfur in Sudan.
- 19 October – the River Suir Bridge opened to traffic as part of the N25 Waterford Bypass. The 230-metre main span was the longest single bridge span in the country.
- 27 October – a tenth person was confirmed to have died from swine influenza in Ireland.

=== November ===
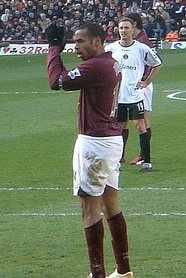
Association footballer Thierry Henry caused a controversy in November.

- Continuing: Mass floods across Ireland, the most affected areas were the south coastal counties and cities, such as Cork City, the worst hit.
- 1 November – the Gaelic Athletic Association celebrated its 125th anniversary.
- 6 November – tens of thousands of people marched across eight cities in protest at government cutbacks.
- 7 November – a street in Belfast disappeared into a large hole.
- 9 November – Sligo was heavily flooded.
- 12 November – Passage West in County Cork was heavily flooded.
- 13 November – John McFarlane was sentenced to at least twenty years in prison at the Old Bailey in London for the murder of Dublin mother Mary Griffiths at her home in Suffolk.
- 14 November – the Papal ban on discussion of the ordination of women priests was challenged by Willie Walsh, Bishop of Killaloe, during his address to the Association of European Journalists in Dublin.
- 14 November – Scoil Mhuire Community School in Clane, County Kildare removes security cameras from student toilets following a two-day protest by parents and students.
- 17 November – Brian Hennessy, a 23-year-old postal worker, was sentenced to life imprisonment for the murders of Sharon Whelan and her two daughters, Zara and Nadia, in Roscon, County Kilkenny in the early hours of Christmas Day of 2008.
- 19 November – the Football Association of Ireland made an official complaint to FIFA and requested a replay, after France qualified for the 2010 FIFA World Cup the previous night with a goal resulting from a double handball by their striker and team captain Thierry Henry. FIFA and the French Football Federation refused. The incident attracted comment globally. Fans protested outside the French embassy in Dublin. The match had been watched by Ireland's highest television audience of 2009 and the highest audience for any sporting event in the country since 1995.
- 20 November – the Progressive Democrats political party was officially dissolved.
- 25 November – Ireland's largest tour operator, Budget Travel, ceased trading.
- 26 November – the Murphy Report of the Commission of Investigation into the Catholic Archdiocese of Dublin was published.
- 26 November – an outbreak of measles occurs in Galway.
- 27 November – it was announced that Máire Geoghegan-Quinn has been allocated Research and Innovation in the European Commission.
- 30 November – the Health Service Executive began an expected two-month swine influenza vaccination programme in the nation's primary and secondary schools designed to combat the 2009 flu pandemic.
- 30 November – it was announced that Monaghan's former army barracks is to be converted into an educational campus in a €20 million project intended to accommodate a primary and secondary Gaelscoileanna as well as a higher education institute.

=== December ===
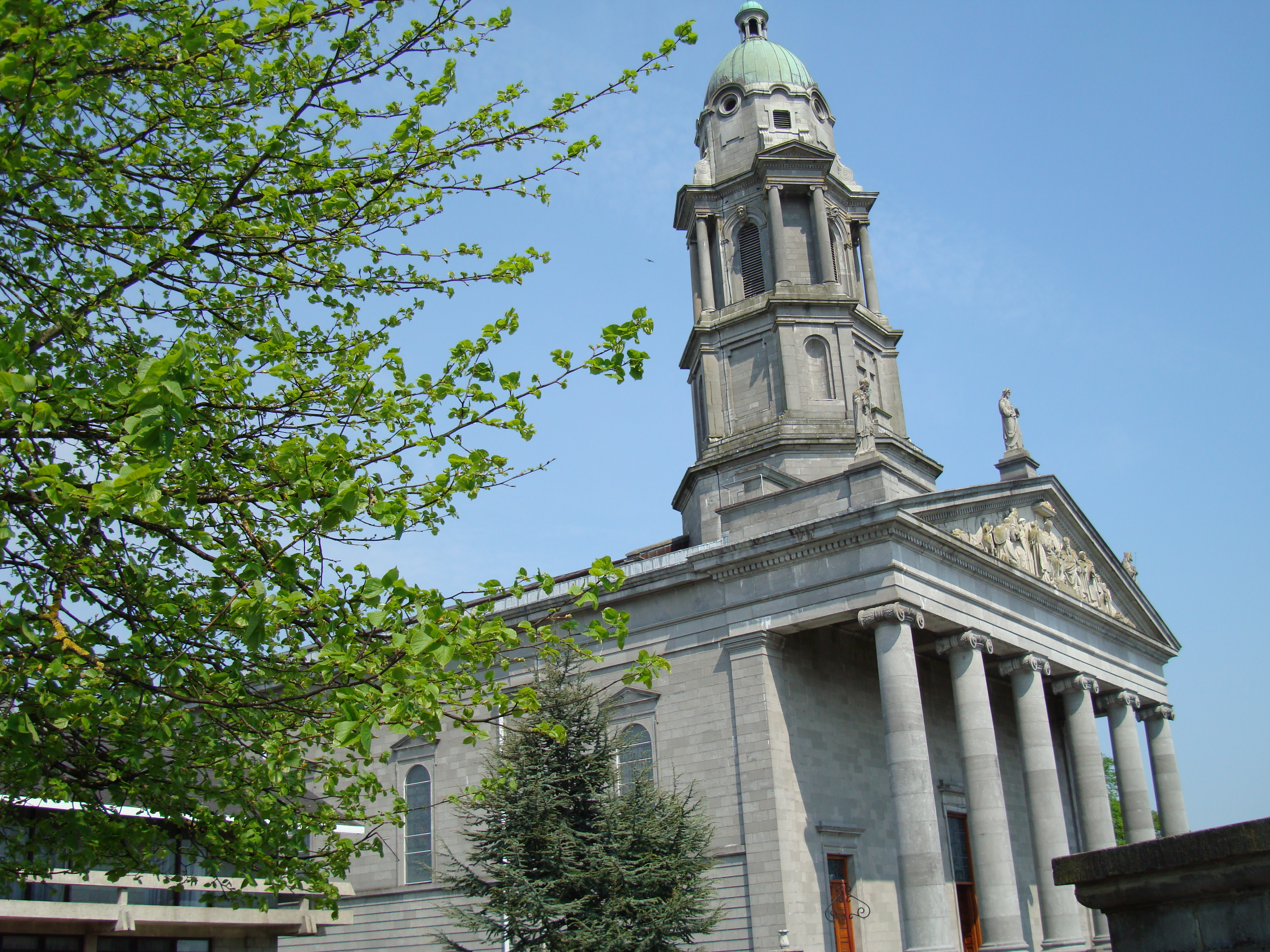
St Mel's Cathedral, Longford was destroyed by fire on 25 December

- 1 December – St. James's Hospital in Dublin reported a 20% increase in newly diagnosed HIV patients for 2009, the highest annual increase ever.
- 2 December – more than 1,200 students at National University of Ireland, Maynooth signed a petition to university management objecting to the appointment of former Taoiseach Bertie Ahern to the position of Honorary Adjunct Professor to the university's School of Business and Law. It followed a letter of protest signed by 36 members of academic staff the previous week.
- 3 December – a speech by Paul McCartney in Brussels angered the president of the Irish Farmers' Association, Padraig Walshe, who accused the ex-Beatle of "leading a flawed campaign against meat that is contradictory on climate change". Member of the European Parliament Mairead McGuinness had earlier described the event as "a media circus without the animals".
- 3 December – the Sisters of Mercy announced that they would contribute property and money worth €128 million following the publication of the Ryan Report in May.
- 6 December – the Department of Agriculture, Fisheries and Food confirmed the slaughter at an undisclosed location of approximately 25–30 horses, some of whom were healthy, despite attempts by Irish Horse Welfare Trust to save as many as possible. The horses had been taken from a farm in County Kilkenny.
- 7 December – Bishop Dermot O'Mahony resigned as patron of The Irish Pilgrimage Trust after his response to child sexual abuse was described as "worse than that of any other living auxiliary bishop of Dublin".
- 7 December – former prison officer Dillon O'Brien was imprisoned for four years on charges of smuggling alcohol, drugs, and mobile phones into Mountjoy Prison, with Judge Katherine Delahunt saying his crime was "at the very high end of the scale".
- 7 December – the funeral of Liam Clancy, the last of The Clancy Brothers, was attended by hundreds of mourners, including the aides-de-camp of the Taoiseach and the President, the Minister for Arts, Sport and Tourism, Martin Cullen, and various musicians and artists.
- 8 December – four new Luas tram stations were opened in Dublin by Minister for Transport Noel Dempsey as the Red Line was expanded to Dublin Docklands.
- 9 December – Minister for Finance Brian Lenihan delivered the nation's Budget for 2010.
- 9 December – the Irish Bishops Conference apologised for the sexual abuse suffered by its children after spending the first day of its winter conference in Maynooth examining the Murphy Report.
- 10 December – in what was described as a landmark case, the Supreme Court of Ireland ruled that a gay man who donated his sperm to a lesbian couple would have access to the resulting child, overturning the original High Court decision. The Gay and Lesbian Equality Network expressed concern at the Supreme Court's rejection of the lesbian couple as a "de facto family".
- 11 December – backbench Green Party TD Paul Gogarty was condemned and forced to apologise for swearing after he yelled "Fuck you, Deputy Stagg, fuck you" at Labour Party TD Emmet Stagg during the Budget 2010 debate on the Social Welfare Bill.
- 13 December – two gardaí were injured in a traffic collision in County Donegal. Garda Gary McLoughlin died the following day. Taoiseach Brian Cowen paid tribute and politicians attended his funeral in County Leitrim on 16 December.
- 15 December – the Supreme Court dismissed the appeal of Mary Roche who sought to have three frozen embryos belonging to her estranged husband, Thomas, released to her for implantation in her womb, a case which highlighted the lack of legislation concerning in vitro fertilisation. The court also ruled that embryos are not recognised or protected as "unborn" under the Constitution.
- 15 December – the funeral of renowned broadcaster and music collector Ciarán Mac Mathúna was attended by hundreds of mourners, including the aides-de-camp of the Taoiseach and the President, the Director-General of RTÉ Cathal Goan, poet Séamus Heaney, and musicians and colleagues.
- 16 December – 78-year-old priest Thomas Naughton was given a three-year prison sentence for his sexual abuse of an altar boy while he served in Blessington, County Wicklow.
- 17 December – Pope Benedict XVI accepted the resignation of Bishop of Limerick Donal Murray who was criticised by the Murphy Report for his behaviour concerning child sexual abuse.
- 18 December – Seán Sheehy, a priest in Castlegregory, withdrew from work in his parish after shaking the hand of a convicted sex offender in a court in Listowel days earlier. Bishop of Kerry William Murphy disassociated himself from Sheehy and his actions.
- 18 December – Ireland's first motorway to link two cities was opened several months ahead of schedule between Dublin and Galway.
- 23 December – Jim Moriarty, the Bishop of Kildare and Leighlin, resigned, the second bishop to do so following the publication of the Murphy Report. He was followed within 36 hours by the two remaining serving auxiliary bishops in Dublin, Eamonn Walsh and Raymond Field.
- 25 December – St Mel's Cathedral, Longford was destroyed by fire.

== Arts and literature ==
- 5 January – Sebastian Barry won the Costa Prize for Fiction for his novel The Secret Scripture at the 2008 Costa Book Awards.
- 19 March – the poet Seamus Heaney was awarded the David Cohen Prize for Literature, honouring him for his lifetime's work.
- 7–8 March – Brian Cowen nude portraits controversy: Nude portraits of the Taoiseach were hung clandestinely by Conor Casby in the National Gallery of Ireland and Royal Hibernian Academy's gallery.
- 17 April – Seamus Heaney's 70th birthday. A commemorative audio recording, Seamus Heaney Collected Poems, was released of Heaney reading all of his collected work to date.
- 11 June – Man Gone Down, the debut novel of American Michael Thomas, won the 2009 International Dublin Literary Award.
- 23 June – Colum McCann's novel Let the Great World Spin was published in New York City, where it is set.
- 24 November – Colm Tóibín's novel, Brooklyn, and Peter Murphy's novel, John the Revelator, were included on the shortlist for the 2009 Costa Book Awards.
- Gerry Hunt's graphic novel Blood Upon the Rose: Easter 1916: The Rebellion that Set Ireland Free was published.
- Claire Kilroy's novel All Names Have Been Changed was published.

=== Music ===
- 25 June – newly formed pop band Industry entered the Irish charts with their debut single "My Baby's Waiting".

== Sport ==
=== Boxing ===
- Bernard Dunne
  - On 21 March, Bernard Dunne became the WBA Super Bantamweight World Champion at the O2 in Dublin.
  - On 26 September, he lost to Poonsawat Kratingdaenggym in the same venue after two minutes and 57 seconds of the third round.

=== Gaelic games ===
- 2009 All-Ireland Hurling season
  - Semi-finals:
    - Kilkenny 2–23 Waterford 3–15
    - Tipperary 6–19 Limerick 2–7
  - Final:
    - Kilkenny 2–22 Tipperary 0–23, Croke Park, 6 September.
- 2009 All-Ireland Football season
  - Semi-finals:
    - Cork 1–13 Tyrone 0–11
    - Meath 1–7 Kerry 2–8
  - Final:
    - Cork 1–09 versus Kerry 0–19, Croke Park, 20 September.

=== Golf ===
- 17 May – Offaly man Shane Lowry became just the third amateur to win a European Tour event by clinching the Irish Open in a playoff.
- 28 November – Ireland finish second to Italy in the 2009 Omega Mission Hills World Cup.

=== Sailing ===
- 24 May, Leg 7 of the 2008–09 Volvo Ocean Race finished in Galway Bay.

=== Football ===
Hosting
29 January – UEFA announces that the new Lansdowne Road stadium would host the 2011 Europa League Final, the new title for the UEFA Cup.

League of Ireland
Premier Division Winner; Bohemians
First Division Winner; UCD
A Division Winner; Salthill Devon
Promoted to Premier Division; Sporting Fingal
Relegated to First Division; Bray Wanderers, Derry City
FAI Ford Cup; Sporting Fingal
FAI EA Sports Cup: Bohemians

Internationals
29 May – Ireland 1–1 Nigeria (London, UK)
6 June – Ireland 1–1 Bulgaria (Sofia, Bulgaria)
12 August – Ireland 0–3 Australia (Thomond Park, Limerick)
8 September – Ireland 1–0 South Africa (Thomond Park, Limerick)

First ever Irish-based senior international matches to be played in the Mid-West and the first to be played outside Dublin in twenty-four years. Training in County Tipperary.

World Cup 2010 Qualifiers
11 February – Ireland 2–1 Georgia
28 March – Ireland 1–1 Bulgaria
1 April – Italy 1–1 Ireland
6 June – Bulgaria 1–1 Ireland
5 September – Cyprus 1–2 Ireland
10 October – Ireland 2–2 Italy
14 October – Ireland 0–0 Montenegro
14 November – Ireland 0–1 France
18 November – France 1–1 Ireland

=== Rallying ===
- 30 January – 1 February Rally Ireland was held. The rally was won by Sébastien Loeb.

=== Rugby union ===
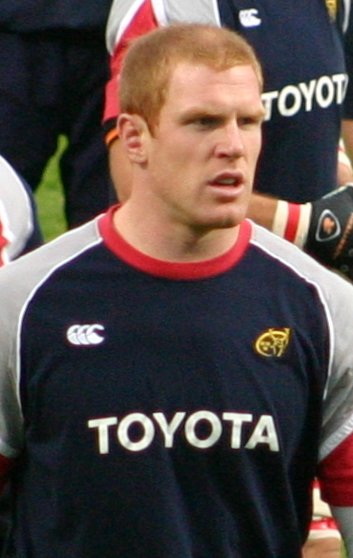
In a successful year for rugby union in Ireland, Paul O'Connell was named captain of the British & Irish Lions squad for their tour of South Africa.

2009 Six Nations Championship
7 February – Ireland 30–21 France
15 February – Italy 9–38 Ireland
28 February – Ireland 14–13 England
14 March – Scotland 15–22 Ireland
21 March – Wales 15–17 Ireland

- 21 March – Ireland won the 2009 Six Nations Championship and Triple Crown as well as the Grand Slam for first time in 61 years.
- 21 April – Paul O'Connell named as the captain of the British & Irish Lions squad to tour South Africa this summer along with 13 other Irish players.
- 28 November – Declan Kidney was named IRB International Coach of the Year, the first Irishman to achieve this, and Ireland are named IRB International Team of the Year on the same day they defeat World and Tri Nations champions South Africa at Croke Park to end the year undefeated.
- 9 December – Declan Kidney was awarded Philips Sports Manager of the Year for the third time in four years, beating Brian Cody, John Oxx and Giovanni Trapattoni to the title.
- 2008–09 Heineken Cup

12 April – Muster and Leinster reached the semi-finals.
2 May – Leinster beat Munster 25–6 in the Heineken Cup semi-final at Croke Park in front of a world-record 82,208 attendance for a club match.
23 May – Leinster beat Leicester in the Heineken cup final, the fourth time an Irish province has done so.

2009–10 Heineken Cup
10 October – Munster and Leinster began their Heineken Cup season, with Leinster defending a title and Munster looking to win back the crown.

== Deaths ==
=== January to July ===
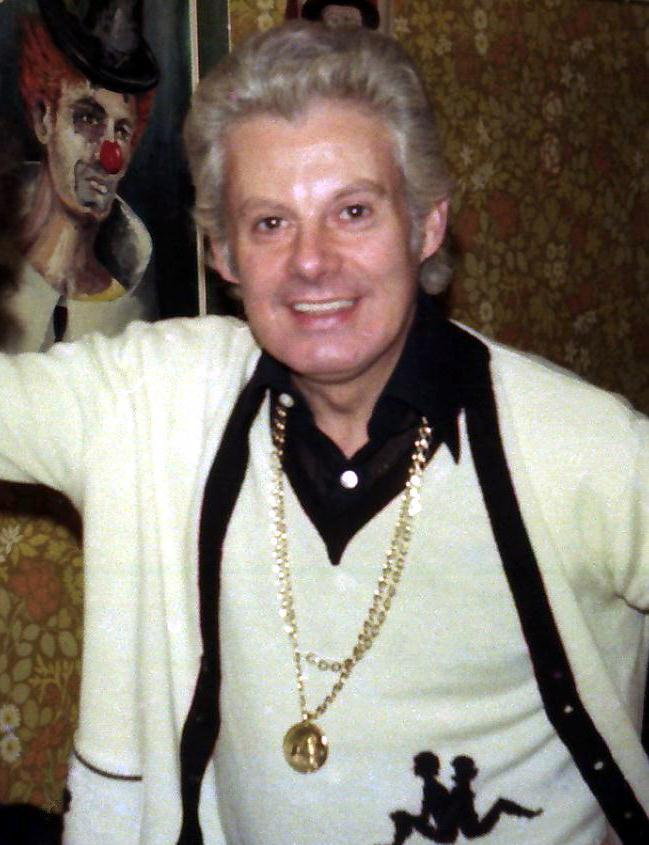
Danny La Rue

- 2 January – Tony Gregory, 61, Independent TD sitting in Dáil Éireann.
- 27 January – Connie Buckley, 93, former Cork hurler and oldest surviving All-Ireland-winning captain.
- 7 February – Joe Haverty, 72, former Irish soccer player.
- 12 February – Hugh Leonard, 82, playwright.
- 15 February – John Rackard, 80, member of the famous Rackard hurling brothers from Wexford.
- 18 February – Nell McCarthy, retired camogie player, manager and former president of the Camogie Association of Ireland.
- 27 February – Joe Bruton, 99, prominent farmers' rights campaigner, journalist and father of Fine Gael politicians John and Richard Bruton.
- 5 March – Patrick Cummins, 88, former Fianna Fáil TD
- 8 March – Anna Manahan, 84, Tony Award-winning actress of stage and screen.
- 9 March – Frank Stockwell, 80, former Galway Gaelic footballer.
- 23 March – Billy Rackard, 79, former Wexford hurler.
- 7 April – Paddy O'Hanlon, barrister and SDLP politician (born 1944)
- 17 April – Kevin McConnell, 84, former Meath Gaelic footballer.
- 19 April – Tony Kett, 57, Fianna Fáil party Senator.
- 27 April – Karl Mullen, 82, former Rugby Union player and Grand Slam-winning captain of 1948.
- 28 April – Pearse Wyse, 81, Former Progressive Democrats founding member and former Lord Mayor of Cork.
- 5 May – Philomena Garvey, 83, former golfer.
- 9 May – David Marcus, 85, literary editor.
- 12 May – Roger Ryan, former Tipperary hurler.
- 20 May – Alan Kelly, Sr., 72, former Ireland international goalkeeper.
- 27 May – E. D. "Ned" Doyle, 90, military figure and analyst.
- 31 May – Danny La Rue, 81, entertainer known for his singing and drag impersonations.
- 1 June – Vincent O'Brien, 92, race horse trainer.
- 13 June – Michael Collins, former Wexford hurler.
- 28 June – Rita Keane, 86, traditional singer.
- 29 June – Sheila Cloney, 83, leader of the Ne Temere decree incident or "Fethard Boycott".

=== July to December ===
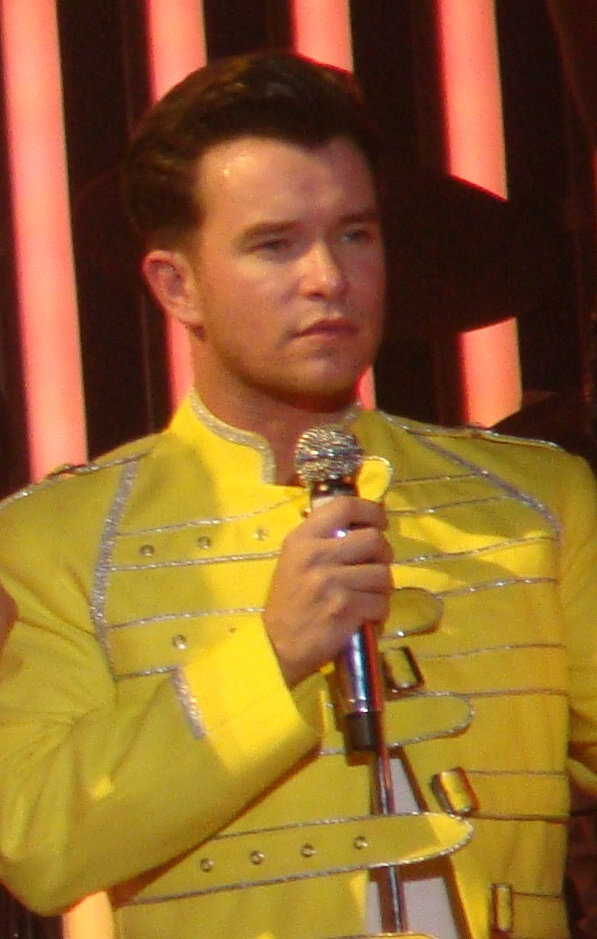
Stephen Gately

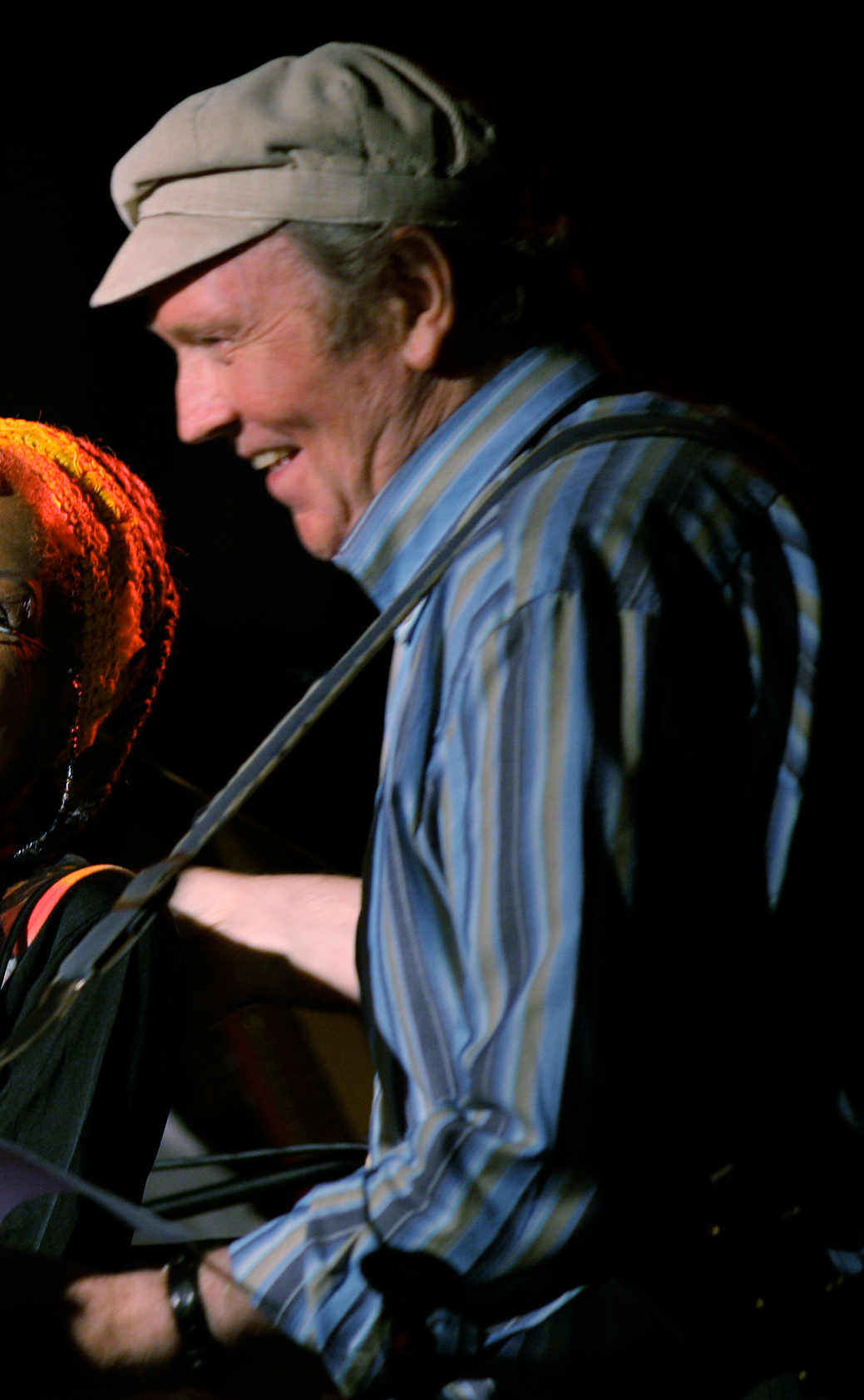
Liam Clancy

- 11 August – Nuala Fennell, 73, Fine Gael politician.
- 16 August – Paul Healion, 31, cyclist.
- 5 September – Jamie Kyne, 18, jockey.
- 8 September – Stephen White, Louth Gaelic footballer included in the Team of the Century in 1984.
- 14 September – Darren Sutherland, 27, boxer, 2008 Olympic bronze medalist.
- 17 September – Frank Deasy, 49, Emmy Award-winning screenwriter.
- 22 September – Edward Delaney, 79, sculptor—Thomas Davis and Wolfe Tone memorials in Dublin.
- 6 October – Aengus Finucane, 77, priest, Chief Executive of Concern Worldwide (1981–1997).
- 10 October – Stephen Gately, 33, Boyzone singer.
- 11 October – Peter Callanan, 74, politician, member of Seanad Éireann since 1997.
- 27 October – Frank Brady, Jr., association footballer.
- 1 November – Seán Mac Fionnghaile, 57, actor, cancer.
- 2 November – Beverley O'Sullivan, 28, singer and actress.
- 17 November – Paul "Skinny" Kelly, 43, musician – Paranoid Visions.
- 23 November – Pat Quinn, 74, founder of the Quinnsworth supermarket chain and the first person to bring The Rolling Stones to North America.
- 4 December – Liam Clancy, 74, folk singer.
- 6 December – Pat Carolan, former Meath Gaelic footballer.
- 11 December – Ciarán Mac Mathúna, broadcaster and music collector.
- 20 December – Joan Brosnan Walsh, actress (Fair City), motor neurone disease.
- 23 December – Noel O'Connell, 76, hurler (Aghabullogue, Blackrock, Cork senior team).
- 30 December – Dermot Nally, 82, civil servant, sudden death.
- 31 December – Cahal Daly, 92, Catholic priest (Primate of All Ireland 1990–1996).
- 31 December – Justin Keating, 79, humanist and Labour Party politician (Minister for Industry and Commerce, 1973–1977).

== See also ==
- 2009 in Irish television
