= Something to Believe In =

Something to Believe In may refer to:

== Music ==
=== Albums ===
- Something to Believe In (Anna Bergendahl album), and the title song
- Something to Believe In (Curtis Mayfield album), and the title song
- Something to Believe In, APB compilation album and the title song

=== Songs ===
- "Something to Believe In" (Clannad song), 1987
- "Something to Believe In" (Fashawn song), 2015
- "Something to Believe In" (Poison song), 1990
- "Something to Believe In" (Ramones song), 1986
- "Something to Believe In" (Young the Giant song), 2016
- "Something to Believe In", by Aqualung from Memory Man, 2007
- "Something to Believe In", by The Bangles from Everything, 1988
- "Something to Believe In", by Bon Jovi from These Days, 1995
- "Something to Believe In", by FM Static from What Are You Waiting For?, 2003
- "Something to Believe In", by Kesha from Gag Order, 2023
- "Something to Believe In", by Meghan Trainor from Only 17, 2011
- "Something to Believe In", by Mike + the Mechanics from Beggar on a Beach of Gold, 1995
- "Something to Believe In", by The Offspring from Smash, 1994
- "Something to Believe In", by Sarah Brightman from As I Came of Age, 1990
- "Something to Believe In", by Steve Miller Band from The Joker, 1973
- "Something to Believe In", by Van Hunt, Jon McLaughlin, and Jason Mraz from Randy Jackson's Music Club, Vol. 1, 2008
- "Something to Believe In", from the musical film Spectacular!, 2009
- "Something to Believe In (Jeremiah)", by Parachute from The Way It Was, 2011

== Other uses ==
- Something to Believe in: Is Kurt Vonnegut the Exorcist of Jesus Christ Superstar?, a book by Robert L. Short
- Something to Believe In (film), a 1998 film starring Tom Conti

== See also ==
- Something (disambiguation)
