= Beerkada =

Filipino comic strip

- Author: Lyndon Gregorio
- Website: http://www.beerkada.net
- Current status/schedule: Daily
- Launch date: June 4, 1998
- Publisher: The Philippine Star
- Genre(s): Humor, everyday life

Beerkada is a popular comic strip that has appeared regularly on The Philippine Star since 1998. Created by Lyndon Gregorio, the strips revolve around an eclectic group of friends as they try to survive college and post-college life. The name "Beerkada" is a portmanteau of "Beer", and "Barkada", a Filipino word for a close-knit group of friends.

The humor employed in the strips are a mixture of Filipino slice-of-life gags, social commentary, and satires of popular culture fixtures (such as movies and TV shows). More often than not, the inspiration for the strips is taken directly from the author's personal experiences. This, in part, explains the strip's occasional foray into sci-fi themes (most notably Star Trek), the fact that the strips seem to take place in a cartoonized UP Diliman, and the fact that the author himself and his friends regularly appear in the strips from time to time.

The strip is set in real time, with the storyline and characters progressing from their student days to their work life. The characters' ages evolve along with an actual timeline with the first strip starting with Glen's university acceptance letter.

== Characters ==
Main characters of Beerkada

=== Main characters ===
Glen dela Costa - He is the everyday-man of the group. He's nice, dependable, loves beer as much as the next guy. The one thing extraordinary about him is his extreme katorpehan (Filipino slang meaning "bashful and shy when it comes to women"), which often manifest in stalker-like tendencies, only to panic and flee when the object of his attention actually notices and tries to befriend him. Despite his shyness with women, he has managed to date a fair number of the opposite sex, most of whom have found his shyness both endearing and exasperating. He has recently proposed marriage to Andrea, the love of his life, who ironically enough, stalked him into submission.

Alan Polantoc - Alan is a hopeless dreamer. He's a dreamer, and he's hopeless, too. One of the long-standing running gags of the strip is of his numerous outrageous thesis proposals. Alan is a career carouser, taking up a second college course to avoid getting a day job after he finally completed his degree after 9 years in college based on his ingenious thesis on 'Protestnology' that he developed for Jay. Although he has no problem with flirting with women he finds attractive, he is nevertheless the one-woman man of the group, and an attentive, devoted boyfriend to Boopey. Alan (along with Glen and Bryan) is one of the most visible characters in the strip.

Boopey Valenzuela - Pragmatic, severe, and no-nonsense, Boopey doesn't like idiots around her – which makes it that much harder to fathom the success of her relationship with the mischievous Alan and her being best friends with the quirky Dana. Boopey is the resident "babe" of the group, causing a commotion amongst the male student body when she wore a micro-mini skirt on campus. She is not above using her feminine wiles to manipulate the hapless Alan into doing her bidding, no matter how humiliating it gets for him.

Dana Aguila - Attractive, chic, shallow, ditzy, slightly naughty, and a little flaky, Dana is the sexy girlfriend college guys dream of. As the resident bimbo of the group, Dana managed to handle awkward relationships almost without the accompanying heartaches. She has had a thing for Glen since their freshman year and managed to become his first girlfriend. Dana is the first girl to initially join the group, and is constantly protecting Jimmy from being exploited by others when she's not busy exploiting his cluelessness herself. She left the country on an exchange student program in Europe a few months after graduation, coming home to the Philippines periodically to touch base with her friends. She remains one of the most popular Beerkada characters despite her long absences from the strip.

Jimmy Goco - The most clueless person on the bunch. Managed to get a girlfriend (now his wife) and magna cum laude honors without even knowing it. Despite his naivete, Jimmy never gets the short end of any deal. He proves the old Chinese saying, "a self-forgotten man is protected by the fates", as most who seek to take advantage of him find their scheme backfiring on them. A recent storyline reveals that Jimmy has sired the latest reincarnation of 'The Child of Ages' and that Jimmy himself is the reincarnation of a forgetful monk known as 'The Unmindful One'.

Bryan Strada - God's gift to women, at least, that's what he claims. He manages to have a dozen relationships at any given time (and always getting caught as well). He is the only person to have dated Sadako and lived. Bryan wants to live a Hedonistic lifestyle and gets away with it. He is currently employed in a call center agency. One of Bryan's latest exploits has him winning the 'StreetNikling' championship (a hiphop/street variation of the Filipino national dance) by pole dancing on the Tinikling pole.

Harry Galisaso - Evil incarnate and a resident geek/con artist with no sense of fashion. He is a tad annoying and a narcissist, despite himself, he is a part of the gang as he proves his usefulness to them. He is notorious for peddling unlicensed DVDs, contraband, scalped concert tickets, or the answers to the upcoming midterms, for a fee. Harry is forever trying to take advantage of people around him despite always having his own schemes blow up in his face. Harry is also known for planning grand schemes but somehow he always end up executing them as petty misdeeds. He also created the destructive loving-loving virus during his tenure in college.

Jay Bilasko - The resident activist. Always seen at rallies, and has an intimate knowledge of cops, truncheons, and fire hoses. He is also the self-appointed outdoorsman of the group, often initiating the gang's various adventures. He is the character most likely to be arrested, or fall off a cliff or both. A recent storyline reveals that Jay has hired Harry as chief marketing manager for his anti-establishment supplies company.

Fe Goco - Jimmy's girlfriend, then wife. While she is almost as naive as Jimmy, she is smart and practical enough when the occasion calls for it, and is capable of setting up ingenious contingency plans to compensate for Jimmy’s shortcomings. Fe has given birth to her and Jimmy's first child, Chichi, a daughter who has shown much potential to be far wiser than her parents.

Andrea the Chompy - Glen's fiancee, who has the nasty habit on chomping on his shoulders. He met her after he graduated and she was a college freshman. Andrea is notorious for getting Glen into (and out of) scrapes. A very possessive girlfriend, she has a tendency to go medieval on any female who dares to lay an eye on her man. Andrea’s (last name unrevealed) obsession over Glen probably overwhelmed Glen’s extreme shyness towards women. Andrea's dachshund 'Mini-Chomps's gave birth to her first litter a few months ago, one puppy of which she gave to Jimmy and Fe's baby daughter.

=== Minor characters ===
Psychocow - the official mascot of the Beerkadets. Psychocow is a bull who grew udders as a side effect during his drug test subject days. A formidable racketeer with a fast mouth and a foul temper; one storyline found him sent to a mascot academy to learn the basics of being a proper mascot. He ended up taking over the school.

Aling McBeal - The proprietor of "Aristocart", a sidewalk stall that serves cheap, dangerous meals to students. This character's name is named for the popular 1990s TV show Ally McBeal. Aling McBeal has a tendency to use anything close at hand as ingredients for her street fare from santa's reindeer to post owls, sewer rats, and vampire trees.

Prof. Macky Agong - Dana's ex-boyfriend, who happened to marry someone else while they were still seeing each other.

Vernon - Boopey’s young nephew whom she babysits from time to time. What his parents don’t know is that Boopey often leaves Vernon in Alan's charge while she studies. Vernon once won a prize from a Halloween contest by allowing Alan to suit him up as a toilet paper mummy. Victory quickly turned to shame as Alan dragged him to the nearest men’s room when a bout of diarrhea struck the latter.

Dave Barista Aling McBeal's erstwhile assistant/barista cum bodyguard. He is named after Filipino-Greek wrestler, Dave Batista.

Chichi Goco Jimmy and Fe's daughter and the latest incarnation of the child of ages. She is incredibly intelligent, which proves the old Chinese saying. 'Inferior bamboo often produce superior shoots'.

Chichi the dog/Monk Baby Chichi's faithful dog, protector, and companion. Chichi the dog is the reincarnation of the monk who looked for, and verified that Chichi Goco is the current incarnation of the child of ages. Monk was murdered by an assassin who was looking to kill the child of ages. He was then reborn in the form of a female puppy who was part of the litter born from Andrea's dog Mini-Chomps.

Apples - Jay's girlfriend that met him in a rally after she thinks she is in a mall 'sale'.

== Themes ==
=== Brand of humor ===
Beerkada relies on satire and social commentary to provide humor. Most of the time, the strips are hilarious takes on everyday life and local popular culture, college life initially, and lately, office life. Every now and then, the strips will poke fun at the current hot trend or item. Films, of both Filipino and Hollywood staple, are a particularly favorite target. often, the strip takes the premise of a movie and applies it to the Beerkada world, with comical results. Examples of this would be the use of precogs to determine if a student will pass or fail (from Minority Report), the gangs quest to get rid of a "cursed vcd" (spoofing The Ring), and the street food vendor selling the balut version of the egg from the Alien franchise.

=== Breaking of the fourth wall ===
Beerkada has also been known to break the "fourth wall", as when the action shifts to the "real world", and the author appears on the strips to converse with the reader. The topics of discussions usually center on the author's experiences as a cartoonist, and in the course of dialogue with the character, Psychocow.

The latter was originally part of these strips separate from the Beerkada storyline, but eventually he was introduced in the form of a "Seeing Eye cow" for the "legally blind" Alan. He is therefore one of two characters that has appeared in both the Beerkada storyline and the cartoonist dialogues.

The other character to do so is the author himself. Noteworthy is his appearance as the "Architect" during the "Neo/Alan" Matrix arc.

== Books ==
=== Chronological releases ===
Since 2000, the Beerkada comic strips have been compiled chronologically into comic book collections, with each book spanning one school year plus its subsequent summer vacation for the first five books, and one full year for the later books.

There are currently ten books available, plus a graphic novel:

- Beerlenium
- BeerkaDos
- TresKada
- BeerKwatro
- Go-Beerkada
  - Go-Beerkada: Rise Of The Jhologs
- Beerkada Off Campus
- Fantakada/Chompy Begins
- BFF
- Akibakada
- Dekada

=== Graphic novel ===
A spin-off graphic novel titled "Go Beerkada: Rise of the Jhologs" was released on October 18, 2009. Based on the cover art of the 5th Beerkada book, the graphic novel is a stand-alone story set in the timeline parallel tho the events of the beerkada's senior year in college, with fantasy elements and a pinoy take of the Super Sentai genre.
