= Beverley O'Sullivan =

Irish singer (1981–2009)

- Born: 16 January 1981; Donaghmede, Dublin, Ireland
- Died: 2 November 2009 (aged 28) Bharatpur, India
- Genres: Pop
- Occupations: Singer; actress
- Website: beverleyosullivan.com (archived)

Beverley O'Sullivan (16 January 1981 – 2 November 2009) was an Irish singer and actress from Dublin. She was killed in a traffic collision in India in 2009.

== Biography ==
O'Sullivan was born in the Donaghmede district of Dublin. As a child she had glue ear and began to wear a hearing aid. With her fellow members of Fifth Avenue she toured with Westlife for three consecutive years before they split. She did not inform her fellow members of Fifth Avenue that she had hearing difficulties when she auditioned to be in the group. They found out when she developed a sore ear during a Westlife performance. She lost a further ten per cent of her hearing whilst flying to Spain to appear in the music video of the group's first single "Spanish Eyes", released in 2004, despite being warned beforehand that her hearing was at risk if she flew. O'Sullivan spoke of her deafness in an article in the British newspaper The Guardian, shortly before her demise. The newspaper compared her with other deaf musicians, such as Phil Collins, Ozzy Osbourne, Fatboy Slim and Pete Townshend, although noted that their deafness developed due to their careers. She continued performing for fans at weddings and in other areas throughout her career even when Fifth Avenue split. Her vocals appeared on the tracks "Through the Light" and "Don't Look Back" on John O'Callaghan's 2009 album Never Fade Away. In January 2008 her cousin, 15-year-old Amy Fitzpatrick, disappeared while walking home from a friend's house in Malaga, Spain.

=== Death ===
O'Sullivan's death occurred in Bharatpur, India on 2 November 2009. She was a passenger in the car. Her boyfriend, 32-year-old Stephen Reeves, was also in the car at the time. He was injured and hospitalised in RBM Bharatpur General Hospital. The couple had been holidaying in India for a few days and had hired the car. Westlife singers Mark Feehily and Nicky Byrne paid tributes: "I am so sad to hear the news of Beverley O'Sullivan's death. I sung alongside her at my cousin's wedding this summer. She was gorgeous and talented", said Feehily. "My thoughts and prayers are with her family and friends. I am in shock", said Byrne.

O'Sullivan played a cabaret singer in Happy Ever Afters, a film which was released on 25 December 2009. Her voice appears on six songs on the film's soundtrack.
