= Blood Upon the Rose =

2009 graphic novel by Gerry Hunt

Blood Upon the Rose: Easter 1916: The Rebellion that Set Ireland Free
- Date: 2009
- Publisher: O'Brien Press

Creative team
- Writers: Gerry Hunt
- Artists: Gerry Hunt
- Colourists: BrenB
- ISBN: 1-84717-217-2

Blood Upon the Rose: Easter 1916: The Rebellion that Set Ireland Free is a 2009 graphic novel written and illustrated by Irish author Gerry Hunt and published by O'Brien Press.

The novel was the first to depict the events of the 1916 Easter Rising in Dublin by Irish Nationalists in comic form, and has been praised for avoiding artistic licence when re-telling the story and for the extensive research that was done to maintain factual authenticity, though some claimed it carried a 'strong pro-Republican bias'.

It covers the Rising from its planning stages through to the executions of its leaders, although it has been criticised for being too short, with significant events that occurred during the 1916 Easter week not having 'space to breathe'. The title comes from a poem by Joseph Plunkett, who was married a few hours before his execution for his involvement as one of the leaders of the Rising.
