= Something to Believe In: Is Kurt Vonnegut the Exorcist of Jesus Christ Superstar? =

Something to Believe in: Is Kurt Vonnegut the Exorcist of Jesus Christ Superstar?
- First edition
- Author: Robert L. Short
- Language: English
- Published: 1978 by Harper & Row, San Francisco
- Publication place: United States
- ISBN: 0-06-067381-8
- OCLC: 3872673

Something to Believe in: Is Kurt Vonnegut the Exorcist of Jesus Christ Superstar? is a 1977 book by Robert L. Short, which discusses the deleterious effects of organized religions on people's faith.

== Introduction ==
Through the use of cartoons, religious history, historical figures and references to popular culture, Short argues that most organized religions are doing a disservice to people, with their mischaracterizations of God, and thus are perversely driving people away from religion and causing them to look for alternatives, most of which result in disappointment. Short's opinion is basically that of universal reconciliation, that Christ died for all persons, everyone will get into heaven when they die, and not merely those who are "saved."

The title of the book is an amalgam of the name of the author Kurt Vonnegut, whom Short knew personally; the motion picture The Exorcist; and the play (and subsequent movie) Jesus Christ Superstar, commenting on their references to religion.

== Methodology ==
The book looks into the ways in which popular culture at any particular time, tends to change the face of God and how people see Him. One of the arguments Short makes is that, because of organized religion giving God very harsh attributes, most of which are not supported by scripture, organized religion ironically tends to drive people away from God, seeing Him perversely as a "Monster God" who is cruel, merciless and mean, instead of a God of Love, Mercy and Charity.

Short argues that the typical portrayal of God - and the ideas of heaven and hell - by mainstream churches is incorrect and not in line with Biblical teachings, and the concept of a heaven that only some can enter, and the alternative of a burning eternity in Hell, presupposes God not as a being of love, but an entity who torments people out of pure sadism, and as such, is more likely to drive people away from Christianity. Short points out that the idea of hell as a place of burning torment is not an idea derived from the Bible, but from the literary device in Dante's Inferno. Short argues that the Bible provides that all persons get into heaven (not just a select few), and the hell the Bible speaks of is not a place one goes to after one dies, but the suffering one goes through while alive if they become separated from God. This misreading of the Bible is the type of error, Short argues, that for those who believe in the goodness of people, would therefore be more likely to encourage them to choose atheism. "If I had to believe in that sort of monster God that most mainstream churches are proposing, I'd still be an atheist, too."

Short also argues that, atheists tend not to focus upon the concept of the afterlife, because, if one dies with nothing beyond one's life, then whether someone is good or bad, they get the same result, annihilation, and the only logical course of action for any person in such a state to live would be nihilism, to live for oneself without regard to how it affects others. It would mean that someone like Adolf Hitler, or Joseph Stalin would, at the end of their life, receive the same result as Mother Teresa; no matter how bad or rotten you were, you get the same result as someone who was the holiest of holies. Also, he points out that if human beings have no existence beyond this life, "then the murder of six million Jews during The Holocaust is of no more significance than the killing of six million cockroaches when a tenement building is fumigated."

He quotes a speech by a priest in the book The Brothers Karamazov, who makes the point that morality cannot exist without immortality, because if there is nothing beyond this world, then human beings are the same as animals (we do not have a soul), and as a result, anything is permitted.
