= Robert L. Short =

American minister

Robert L. Short (1932 – July 6, 2009) was an American Presbyterian minister and the author of several books of "popular theology", including the 1965 bestseller The Gospel According to Peanuts.

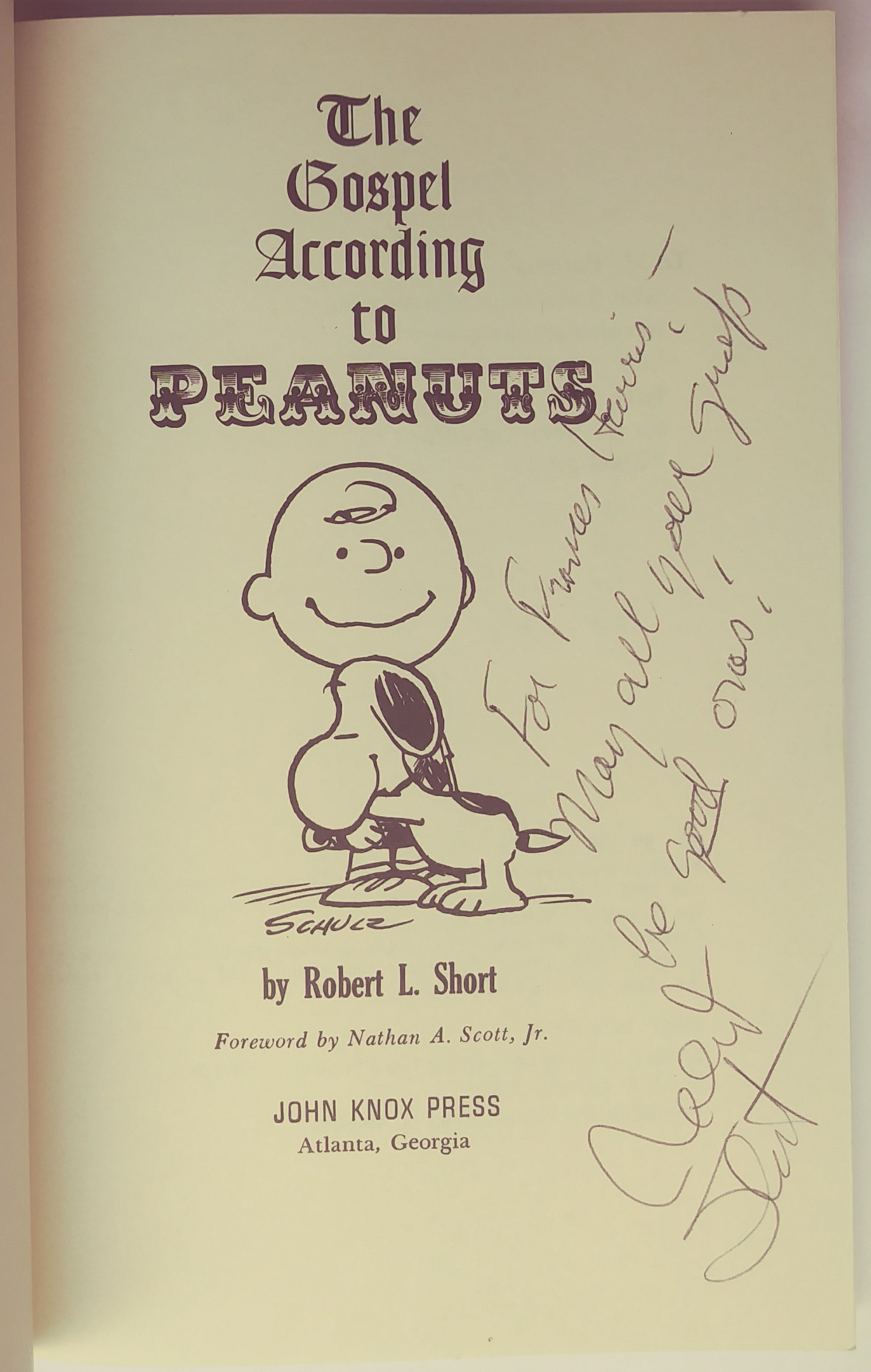
Title page of The Gospel According to Peanuts, signed by Robert L. Short

== Life and career ==
Short was born and raised in Midland, Texas. He attended the University of Oklahoma and received a B.A. He then earned a Master of Divinity degree from Perkins School of Theology at Southern Methodist University. For the next few years, Short worked as a professional actor, appearing in commercial and religious television, and also directed religious drama. He continued his education, receiving a M.A. in English from North Texas University.

In 1963, Short moved to Chicago, where he met his wife, Ellen Kay Coale, and received an M.A. in theology and literature from the University of Chicago. He subsequently engaged in graduate studies in systematic theology at Garrett–Evangelical Theological Seminary at Northwestern University. He and his wife settled in Wilmette, Illinois, where they raised three children.

In 1965, Short published his first book, The Gospel According to Peanuts, which used examples from the comic strip Peanuts to explain points of Christian theology. It was an immediate success, and was the best-selling non-fiction book in the U.S. for the year. As of 2012 it had sold over 10 million copies in the U.S. The book followed his article, "The Penultimate Peanuts", published in Motive Magazine in October 1963.

Seven additional books followed. Of The Parables of Peanuts (1968), Peanuts creator Charles M. Schulz wrote, "This new book is filled with wonderful quotes and is a real delight from beginning to end. Actually, I could not possibly be more pleased."

Later books included A Time to Be Born–A Time to Die (1973), The Gospel from Outer Space (1983), Short Meditations on the Bible and Peanuts (1990), The Gospel According to Dogs: What Our Four-Legged Saints Can Teach Us (2007), and The Parables of Dr. Seuss (2008).

The success of his books led to a second career as a speaker, teacher, and guest preacher at churches, schools, and seminaries around the world. He also wrote many articles for magazines, and was a frequent contributor to Motive Magazine, which published his first article on Peanuts.

In 1991 Short was ordained as a minister of the Presbyterian Church, and became associate pastor and "theologian in residence" of the First Presbyterian Church of Brighton, Michigan. He later became head of staff and pastor, specializing in preaching, adult Christian education and confirmation instruction. In 1996, he became minister of the First Presbyterian Church of Monticello, Arkansas.

In 2001, Short moved to Little Rock, Arkansas, where he started a new church of his own: "the Church of the Gospel of JESUS (Jesus Exclusively Secured Unconditional Salvation)", or "Christianity Without Doom and Gloom".

Short died on July 6, 2009, in Little Rock.

== Works ==
- Short, Robert L. (1965). The Gospel According to Peanuts. Schulz, Charles M. Richmond: John Knox Press. ISBN 9780804219686. OCLC 1964404 – via Internet Archive.
- Short, Robert L. (2002) [First published 1968]. The Parables of Peanuts. Schulz, Charles M. San Francisco: HarperSanFrancisco. ISBN 0-06-001161-0.
- Short, Robert L. (1973). A Time to Be Born–A Time to Die. San Francisco: Harper & Row. ISBN 0-06-067676-0. OCLC 623321 – via Internet Archive.
- Short, Robert L. (1978). Something to Believe In: Is Kurt Vonnegut the Exorcist of Jesus Christ Superstar?. San Francisco: Harper & Row. ISBN 0-06-067381-8. OCLC 3872673.
- Short, Robert L. (1983). The Gospel from Outer Space. San Francisco: Harper & Row. ISBN 0-06-067376-1. OCLC 611951307 – via Internet Archive.
- Short, Robert L. (1990). Short Meditations on the Bible and Peanuts. Schulz, Charles M. Louisville, Ky: Westminster/John Knox Press. ISBN 0-664-25152-8 – via Internet Archive.
- Short, Robert L. (1991). The Bible According to Peanuts. HarperCollins/STL. ISBN 0-00-627562-1.
- Short, Robert L. (2007). The Gospel According to Dogs: What Our Four-Legged Saints Can Teach Us. HarperOne. ISBN 978-0-06-119874-8 – via Internet Archive.
- Short, Robert L. (2008). The Parables of Dr. Seuss. Louisville, KY: Westminster John Knox Press. ISBN 978-0-664-23047-0. OCLC 470702226.

== See also ==
- Bartholomew Cubbins
