= Roy Raymonde =

English cartoonist (1929–2009)

- Born: 26 December 1929; Grantham, England
- Died: 14 September 2009 (aged 79); Essex, England
- Spouse: Patricia Raymonde
- Website: royraymonde.com

Roy Raymonde (26 December 1929 – 14 September 2009) was a British editorial cartoonist best known for his work in Playboy, Punch and The Sunday Telegraph. He was much admired for his stylish comic drawings and flamboyant use of colour.

== Early life ==
Raymonde was born on 26 December 1929, in Grantham, to Juliana Patricia Quinn and Barry Raymonde, an advertising agent and theatrical impresario. They were living in Bristol in 1938 when Barry contracted pneumonia and died, leaving Patricia (who was pregnant with her second child, Patsy) to fend for her family. Their life became peripatetic as Patricia took a series of jobs around the country. During this period Raymonde attended at least 16 different schools. They finally settled in North London just in time for the Blitz. He recounted that the Kingsbury house they lived in was completely demolished one night by a German land mine. Fearing that he had been killed, the firemen feverishly cleared the rubble only to find him soundly asleep in his bed, blankets pulled over his head.

At age 15, Raymonde attended Harrow School of Art. There he met and was influenced by the yet to become well-known cartoonist Gerard Hoffnung who was at that time a junior tutor. Raymonde told a story of how he was nearly expelled for defacing one of Hoffnung's demonstration drawings by adding funny captions. Hoffnung himself came to his defense and saved his position by arguing that this act in itself demonstrated a certain latent talent. They remained friends until Hoffnung's death in 1959.

Upon leaving art school, Raymonde took a job in a commercial art studio, where he believed that his association with professional illustrators really taught him his drawing skills. At 18 he was called up to do National Service in Malaya, and worked for British Army intelligence in photoreconnaissance.

== Career ==
After being demobilised in 1950, he took a Job at Charles Gilbert's advertising agency in Fleet Street and continued there for the next ten years. During this period he also free-lanced as a cartoonist in his spare time and had his work first published in Tit-Bits. He then contributed to Lilliput, The Daily Sketch and drew a regular weekly feature in Drapery and Fashion Weekly called 'Lil'. In 1953 he married Guyanese journalist Patricia Eytle – sister of Ernest Eytle (BBC Cricket Commentator) Tommy Eytle (actor and musician) and Les Eytle (first black Mayor of and Freeman of Lewisham).

By 1960, he had started working for Punch and was busy enough to become a full-time cartoonist. Shortly after this he sold a regular cartoon strip 'Patsy & John' to The Sunday Telegraph and started a long relationship with that newspaper. Other features followed, notably 'Them', 'Boffins at Bay', 'Raymonde's Rancid Rhymes' (when he forayed into the world of comic poetry) and 'Raymonde's Blooming Wonders' – clever character sketches of notable personalities in the guise of a Victorian botanical encyclopedia. In 1966, he won the Cartoonist's Club of Great Britain's Feature Cartoonist of the Year award. He also produced two books of cartoons in the 1960s, The Constant Minx: From the Beginning (1961) and More Constant Minx (1961). They were a cartoonist's view of women's ability to bewitch men.

In 1963, he bought a thatched cottage near Great Dunmow in Essex, where he lived until his death, on 14 September 2009, aged 79.

During this period Raymonde also had a feature in Mayfair under the editorship of Kenneth Bound. At the same time he started sending cartoon ideas to Playboy. Michelle Urry had just become Hugh Hefner's art editor at Playboy, and was busy assembling an international stable of talented cartoonists. Raymonde's cartoons were accepted, though as far as men's magazines were concerned, on the proviso that he work exclusively for Playboy. From then on he was given a monthly full-colour page for the next 30 years.

His colour cartoons were much admired and he was commissioned to create many Punch covers, a long series of illustrations for Punch's 'Doc Brief' (Robert Buckman's humorous take on the medical world) and regular cartoons for Reader's Digest. Time & Tide magazine also made a short resurgence in the 1990s and he drew covers for it and for British Airways' High Life.

He collaborated with his friend Robert Holles (novelist, playwright and film writer) during this period and illustrated two of his books: The Guide to Real Village Cricket (1983) and The Guide to Real Subversive Soldiering (1985).
