= Corky Trinidad =

American cartoonist

- Born: Francisco Flores Trinidad, Jr. May 26, 1939; Manila, Philippines
- Died: February 13, 2009 (aged 69); Honolulu, Hawaii, U.S.
- Occupation: Cartoonist
- Notable work: Nguyen Charlie, Aloha Eden, Zeus
- Relatives: Noel Trinidad (brother)
- Awards: Allan Saunders Award (ACLU Hawaii), Fletcher Knebel Award (Hawaii Community Media Council)

Francisco Flores Trinidad, Jr. (May 26, 1939 – February 13, 2009), better known by his pen name "Corky", was a Filipino-American editorial cartoonist and comics artist. Born in Manila, he was known for his editorial cartoons for the Honolulu Star-Bulletin since 1969, and especially for his satirical Vietnam War comic strip Nguyen Charlie.

== Biography ==
Francisco Trinidad Jr. came from a family of journalists. His father, Francisco “Koko” Trinidad, was a broadcaster, and his mother, Lina Trinidad, was a columnist. Trinidad became a political cartoonist for the Philippines Herald after he graduated from university in 1961. He later became one of many journalists who fled the Philippines during the dictatorship of Ferdinand Marcos.

Trinidad was the first Asian editorial cartoonist to be syndicated in the United States and the only Asian American editorial cartoonist at a major U.S. metropolitan newspaper. Via syndication, Trinidad's work has appeared in non-U.S. periodicals such as the International Herald Tribune, Denmark's Politiken daily, the Buenos Aires Herald, the Manila Chronicle, and the now-defunct British magazine Punch.

Trinidad's comic Nguyen Charlie was carried by the United States Army's Stars and Stripes newspaper, and each day's strip was eagerly awaited by the GIs in South Vietnam. He later drew two more comic strips, Aloha Eden and Zeus. He also found time to teach cartooning at the University of Hawaii.

Trinidad's editorial cartoons were critical of Hawaii politicians as well as the Marcos dictatorship. A collection of his cartoons chronicling Marcos from his declaring martial law through his exile in Hawaii was published as Marcos: The Rise and Fall of a Regime (Arthouse Books, 1986; ISBN 0-935021-08-6).

In 1982 Trinidad received the Allan Saunders Award from the American Civil Liberties Union of Hawaiʻi, and in 1999 won the Fletcher Knebel Award from the Hawaii Community Media Council. He also received several honors in the editorial cartoon category of the Hawaiʻi Publishers Association's annual Paʻi Awards for excellence in journalism.

In 2005 the Society of Professional Journalists honored Trinidad by naming him to the Hawaii Journalism Hall of Fame."

Corky Trinidad died in Hawaii in 2009 at the age of 69 from pancreatic cancer. He was survived by his wife, Hana, and five children. His obituary in the Honolulu Star Bulletin noted Trinidad's advice for young cartoonists: take a stand.
