= The Gospel According to Peanuts =

Book by Robert L. Short

- First edition
- Author: Robert L. Short
- Illustrator: Charles M. Schulz
- Cover artist: Charles M. Schulz
- Language: English
- Subject: Religion
- Publisher: John Knox Press
- Publication date: 1965
- Publication place: United States
- Media type: Print
- Followed by: The Parables of Peanuts

The Gospel According to Peanuts is a 1965 book written by Robert L. Short about Charles M. Schulz's Peanuts comic strip. The book is based on Short's use of the Peanuts characters to illustrate his lectures about the Christian Gospel.

The book was a best seller and sold over 10 million copies. Summary:

While Charlie Brown, Snoopy, Lucy, Linus, and the rest of the Peanuts gang have enjoyed the kind of success most cartoon characters can only dream about—becoming pop culture icons of the highest order and entering the global consciousness practically as family members—Robert Short's The Gospel According to Peanuts also has found a place in the hearts of many readers....

A 35th anniversary edition of 130 pages was released by Westminster John Knox Press in 2000, with a "new cover, a new interior design, and a new foreword by Martin E. Marty."

A sequel, The Parables of Peanuts, was written by Short in 1968. It was reissued in 2002 by HarperCollins Publishers. Summary:

...[T]his contemporary case for vigorous Christian faith—profusely illustrated by Charles Schulz‘s delightful Peanuts cartoon strips—sheds more light on the Christian faith and how it is to be lived than many more "serious" theological works, with hundreds of cartoons featuring your favorite Peanuts characters Charlie Brown, Lucy, Linus, And of course, Snoopy (including the earliest Red Baron strips). This book‘s wise observations are as timeless as they are timely. "Short... succeeds in making theology enjoyable." —Christian Century "... a real delight from beginning to end. I could not possibly be more pleased." —Charles Schulz, creator of Peanuts."

About 25 years after the publication of the book, Short became a Presbyterian minister.
