= Jamie Kyne =

Irish boxer

Jamie Kyne (1991 – 5 September 2009) was an Irish jockey.

Kyne was the winner of an All Ireland title in youth boxing, but had told his father immediately afterwards that he wanted to be a jockey.

He was apprenticed to John Quinn, one of Britain's top trainers in 2007 by James Hetherton, a racehorse trainer and owner. Kyne died with young Scottish rider, Jan Wilson, in a suspected arson attack at the block of flats in which they were living in North Yorkshire on 5 September. The burial took place at Lackagh Cemetery.
