= Sadako =

Sadako is a Japanese name, commonly used for women. The same name can be written with a variety of kanji, and the meanings of the name differ accordingly:

- 貞子, "chaste child"; the same characters can also be read as a Korean given name Jeong-ja
- 節子, "child of integrity"

== People with the name ==
- Fujiwara no Teishi (藤原 定子; 977–1001), empress consort of the Japanese Emperor Ichijō.
- Princess Sadako Kujō (九条 節子), later Empress Teimei (貞明皇后) of Japan (1884–1951), wife of Emperor Taishō
- Sadako Kurihara (栗原 貞子; 1913–2005), Japanese poet
- Sadako Moriguchi (森口 貞子; 1907–2002), American businesswoman
- Sadako Ogata (緒方 貞子; 1927–2019), Japanese scholar and United Nations administrator
- Sadako Pointer (born 1984), American singer
- Sadako Sasaki (佐々木 禎子; 1943–1955), a childhood Hiroshima atomic bomb victim, who made origami cranes based on a legend about their healing properties, making them an international symbol for peace.
- Sadako Sawamura (沢村 貞子; 1908–1996), Japanese actress
- Toyotomi Sadako (豊臣 完子; 1592–1658), Japanese noble woman
- Sadako Yamamoto (山本 定子; born 1915), Japanese javelin thrower
- Sadako Yamashita (山下 貞子; born 1932), Japanese swimmer

== Entertainment ==
- Sadako Yamamura (山村 貞子), fictional character in the Japanese novel, manga and film franchise Ring
- Sadako (film), 2019 film in the Ring franchise
