= Nguyen Charlie =

American comic strip by Corky Trinidad

Nguyen Charlie is an American gag-a-day comic strip that appeared during the Vietnam War in the Pacific edition of the United States Army military newspaper Stars and Stripes from 1966 to 1974. It was created by Corky Trinidad, an award-winning Philippines-born editorial cartoonist for the Honolulu Star-Bulletin from 1969 until his death in 2009.

== Concept and characters ==
Its title hero is a dedicated (if less than heroic) Nget Cong (as Trinidad calls them) who shares the battlefields of South Vietnam with his American counterparts, everyone having a common interest: survival. The comic strip is non political and both sides are treated equally. No one dies in Nguyen Charlie's war. The cast of characters includes Nguyen Charlie's comrades and their leader (Comrade Commander), as well as the members of a U. S. infantry platoon. Non-combatants are seldom seen, the notorious "mammie-san" who does the GIs' laundry being an exception. Nguyen Charlie was an immediate hit with the GIs and each day's entry was eagerly awaited.

== Background ==
Trinidad created the comic strip in 1966, when he was still living in the Philippines, and Nguyen Charlie first appeared in the Philippines Herald. It was then carried briefly by the Saigon Post, before being picked up by the Stars and Stripes. Trinidad said, "Americans have always been known for their sense of humor, their ability to joke during a crisis, to laugh at themselves during trouble. The Vietnam War was unpopular ... because it was one war where the U.S. was not laughing." Trinidad made two trips to South Vietnam to ensure accuracy, and was always careful not to let politics play a part in the comic strip.

== List of publications ==
Three softcover books compiling the Nguyen Charlie daily strips were published:

- Nguyen Charlie (1969)
- Sorry 'Bout That, Sarge (1970)
- Not In This War, Charlie! (1970)

A fourth softcover book of reprints titled Nguyen Charlie Encores followed in 1985 (Arthouse Books, ISBN 0-935021-01-9).
