= Atlas Black: Managing to Succeed =

Book by Jeremy Short

- Cover of Atlas Black: Managing to Succeed
- Author: Jeremy Short; Talya Bauer; Dave Ketchen
- Original title: English
- Illustrator: Len Simon
- Language: English
- Genre: Graphic novel
- Publisher: Flat World Knowledge
- Publication date: August 2009
- Publication place: United States
- Media type: print (paperback)
- ISBN: 978-0-9823618-4-9

Atlas Black: Managing to Succeed is a graphic novel by Jeremy Short, Talya Bauer, and Dave Ketchen, about a fictional character named Atlas Black and his efforts to create a startup restaurant while completing his senior year of college. The series is illustrated by Len Simon. The compilation contains five chapters published by Flat World Knowledge.

== Overview ==
Faced with meager career opportunities after a series of short-term jobs, Atlas Black decides that his best career prospect is to start his own business. Atlas Black blends the storyline of Atlas’s quest to start his own entrepreneurial startup, with insights from key management theories drawn from the fields of entrepreneurship, organizational behavior and applied psychology, and strategic management.

== Background ==
Atlas Black: Managing to Succeed is the first business management text in graphic novel format. The lead author, Jeremy Short, was inspired by movies such as Office Space and TV shows such as The Office to provide a more entertaining delivery of management content that would follow a storyline rather than disconnected examples common to most traditional textbooks. Texas Tech University, where Short is employed, produced a short interview discussing the book and its potential as a vehicle for learning and education. Short also co-authored the first Harvard Business Publishing case in graphic novel format, which details a fictional company named iPremier as it struggles to deal with a denial of service attack on its online retailer.

Flat World is no longer offering this title effective late 2013

== Storylines ==
=== Chapter 1. Not So Ancient History ===
Atlas Black and his best friend and sidekick David Chan are introduced. Atlas is behind on his rent, and realizes that he needs to take dramatic steps to improve his career prospects. He begins to realize that much of his knowledge of business is based on memorizing terms and buzzwords that he has trouble applying to actual business situations. The mysterious ‘Black’ appears and suggests that starting his own business is a risky proposition, but an acceptable trade-off given Atlas’s other prospects.

=== Chapter 2. How To Make Good Decisions (And Avoid Bad Ones) ===
Atlas attempts to gain funding by completing his tax returns. Much to his surprise, his ex-girlfriend Maria is working at the accounting firm he visits. Atlas explains that he is now taking school more seriously and even applying the idea of a balanced scorecard to his personal life, but Maria is unconvinced. The chapter ends in an embarrassing appearance at a local house party when his friend Tess requesting him as a delivery driver for Pilgrim Pizza, his current job as well.

=== Chapter 3. Blood, SWOT, and Tears ===
Atlas learns that the mechanics of starting his own business are not as difficult or important as the need to develop a specific strategy. Thanks to David, he concludes that a restaurant makes sense of a potential entrepreneurial venture in most college towns – but he also needs a unique hook if this idea it to truly move forward.

=== Chapter 4. Human Resources: Sail or Anchor? ===
After a revelation with the mysterious ‘Black’ while playing disk golf, Atlas develops the idea of the No Cover Café. This restaurant would provide free live music with modestly priced food to attract the audience associated with most college towns. Atlas interviews a classmate for a potential internship, and she is livid to discover the position will be unpaid, providing another opportunity for embarrassment for Atlas.

=== Chapter 5. Charting the Future: Organizational Structure and Fit ===
Atlas realizes the need to become more organized if the No Cover Café is to become a reality, and visits his college’s career fair to contemplate potential employees and other local firms that they could supply their restaurant, such as Cat Lady Coffee – a local coffee shop that Atlas and David frequent.
