= Gerry Hunt =

Irish cartoonist (1936–2018)

- Born: 1936
- Died: 29 June 2018 (aged 81–82) Dublin, Ireland
- Area: Cartoonist
- Notable works: Blood Upon the Rose (2009)

Gerry Hunt (1936 – 29 June 2018) was an Irish cartoonist. He worked as an architect for 25 years, including 18 years at IDA Ireland. In 1986 he turned to cartooning, first drawing political cartoons, then creating a Spanish-language comic which he gave away to friends. In 2003 he created a short series of inner-city Dublin fables told in rhyme, In Dublin City, published by Atomic Diner. He then founded Dublin Comics, which published his crime graphic novel, Streets of Dublin, coloured by BrenB, c. 2005, and a collected edition of In Dublin City, also coloured by BrenB, c. 2007.

In 2009 he created Blood Upon the Rose, a graphic novel retelling the events of the Easter Rising of 1916, again coloured by BrenB, published by O'Brien Press. He is working on the forthcoming Draugr in Dublin City, about a dead Viking reawakened in modern Dublin.

Hunt died on 29 June 2018, at the age of 81–82.
