= Christmas tree =

Decorated tree associated with Christmas

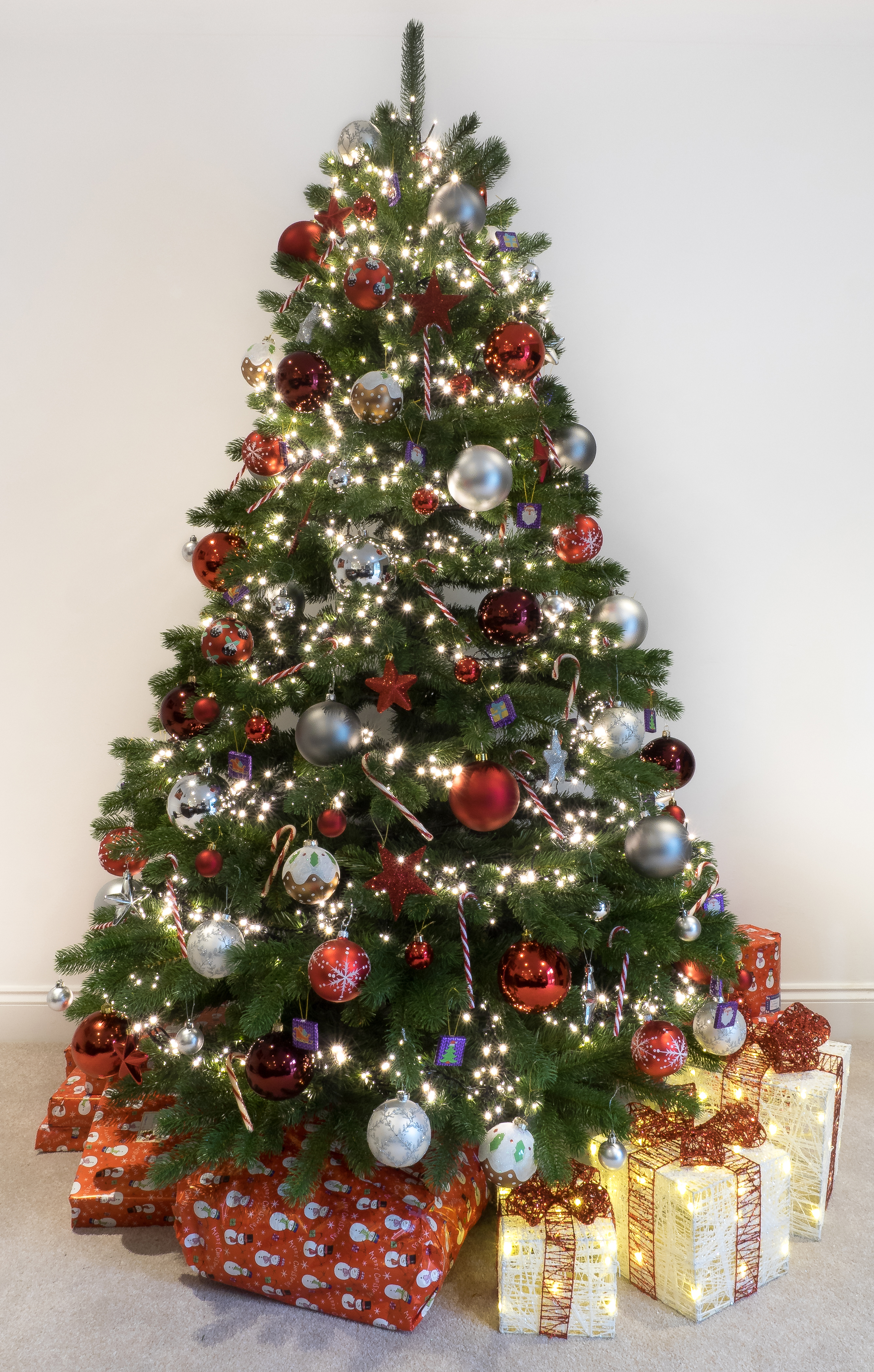
Christmas tree decorated with lights, stars, and glass balls

A Christmas tree is a decorated tree, usually an evergreen conifer such as a spruce, eastern red cedar, pine or fir, associated with the celebration of Christmas. It may also be an artificial tree of similar appearance.

The custom was developed in Central Europe, particularly Germany and Livonia (now Estonia and Latvia), where Protestant Christians brought decorated trees into their homes. The tree was traditionally decorated with "roses made of colored paper, tinsel, apples, wafers, and confectionery". Moravian Christians began to illuminate Christmas trees with candles, which were often replaced by Christmas lights after the advent of electrification. Today, there is a wide variety of Christmas ornaments, such as garlands, baubles, tinsel, and candy canes. An angel or star might be placed at the top of the tree to represent the angel Gabriel or the Star of Bethlehem, respectively, from the Nativity. Edible items such as gingerbread, chocolate, and other sweets are also popular and are tied to or hung from the tree's branches with ribbons. The Christmas tree originated as a custom of the Lutheran churches and only in 1982 did the Catholic Church erect the first Vatican Christmas Tree.

In the Western Christian tradition, Christmas trees are erected on days such as the first day of Advent, or even as late as Christmas Eve, depending on the country; customs of the same faith hold that it is unlucky to remove Christmas decorations, such as the Christmas tree, before Twelfth Night and, if they are not taken down on that day, it is appropriate to do so on Candlemas, the latter of which ends the Christmas-Epiphany season in some denominations.

In the United States, many households begin displaying their Christmas trees around Thanksgiving. The trees are often removed at the beginning of January, with January 1 and January 6 being dates on which some households choose to take down their decorations.

== History ==
=== Origin of the modern Christmas tree ===
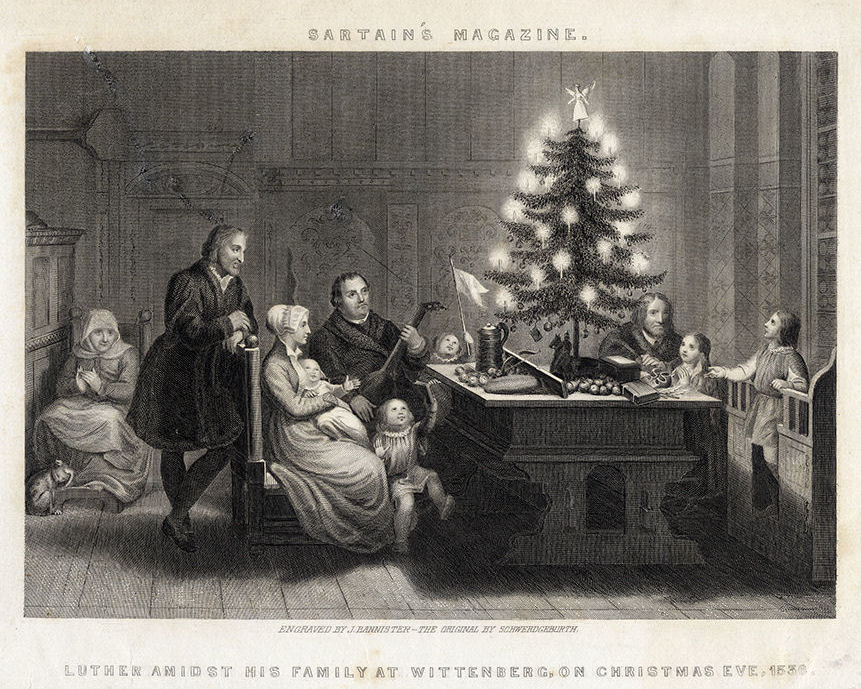
Martin Luther is depicted with his family and friends in front of a Christmas tree on Christmas Eve.

Modern Christmas trees originated in Central Europe and the Baltic states, particularly Germany and Livonia (now Estonia and Latvia) during the Renaissance in early modern Europe. Its 16th-century origins are sometimes associated with Protestant Christian reformer Martin Luther, who is said to have first added lighted candles to an evergreen tree. The Christmas tree was first recorded to be used by German Lutherans in the 16th century, with records indicating that a Christmas tree was placed in the Cathedral of Strasbourg in 1539 under the leadership of the Protestant Reformer Martin Bucer. The Moravian Christians put lighted candles on those trees. The earliest known firmly dated representation of a Christmas tree is on the keystone sculpture of a private home in Turckheim, Alsace (then part of the Holy Roman Empire of the German Nation, today part of France), with the date 1576. In later periods these candles were often replaced by electric Christmas lights following the spread of electrification.

=== Possible predecessors ===
Modern Christmas trees have been related to the "tree of paradise" of medieval mystery plays that were given on 24 December, the commemoration and name day of Adam and Eve in various countries. In such plays, a tree decorated with apples (representing fruit from the tree of the knowledge of good and evil and thus to the original sin that Christ took away) and round white wafers (to represent the Eucharist and redemption) was used in the set for the play. Like the Christmas crib, the Paradise tree was later placed in homes. The apples were replaced by round objects such as shiny red baubles.

Fir trees decorated with apples served as the central prop for the paradise play, a kind of folk religious drama often performed on 24 December. These props were called paradise trees, and some researchers believe they were the forerunners of the Christmas tree.

At the end of the Middle Ages, an early predecessor appears referred in the 15th century Regiment of the Alcobaça Monastery in Portugal. The Regiment of the local high-Sacristans of the Cistercian Order refers to what may be considered the oldest references to the Christmas tree:

Note on how to put the Christmas branch, scilicet: On the Christmas eve, you will look for a large Branch of green laurel, and you shall reap many red oranges, and place them on the branches that come of the laurel, specifically as you have seen, and in every orange you shall put a candle, and hang the Branch by a rope in the pole, which shall be by the candle of the high altar.

In rural Scandinavia during the late Middle Ages, there was a folk custom of decorating the house and barn with evergreen branches in celebration of the New Year, and to scare away the devil. Scandinavians largely did not use Christmas trees for Christmas before adopting it from Germans in the 1740s, and it was only popularised in the mid-1800s.

In discussions of potential folkloric origins, the Christmas tree has sometimes been compared with a hypothetical "Yule-tree". However, historical records from the Viking Age and Old Norse sagas do not have any mentions of decorating trees during Yule.

The story of Saint Boniface cutting down Donar's Oak illustrates the pagan practices in 8th century among the Germans. A later folk version of the story adds the detail that an evergreen tree grew in place of the felled oak and states its triangular shape reminds humanity of the Trinity and how it points to heaven. (Note: The story, not recounted in the vitae written in his time, appears in a BBC Devon website, "Devon Myths and Legends", and in a number of educational storybooks, including St. Boniface and the Little Fir Tree: A Story to Color by Jenny Melmoth and Val Hayward (Warrington: Alfresco Books 1999 ISBN 1-873727-15-1), The Brightest Star of All: Christmas Stories for the Family by Carrie Papa (Abingdon Press 1999 ISBN 978-0-687-64813-9) and "How Saint Boniface Kept Christmas Eve" by Mary Louise Harvey in The American Normal Readers: Fifth Book, 207-22. Silver, Burdett and Co. 1912.)

=== Historical practices by region ===
==== Estonia, Latvia, and Germany ====
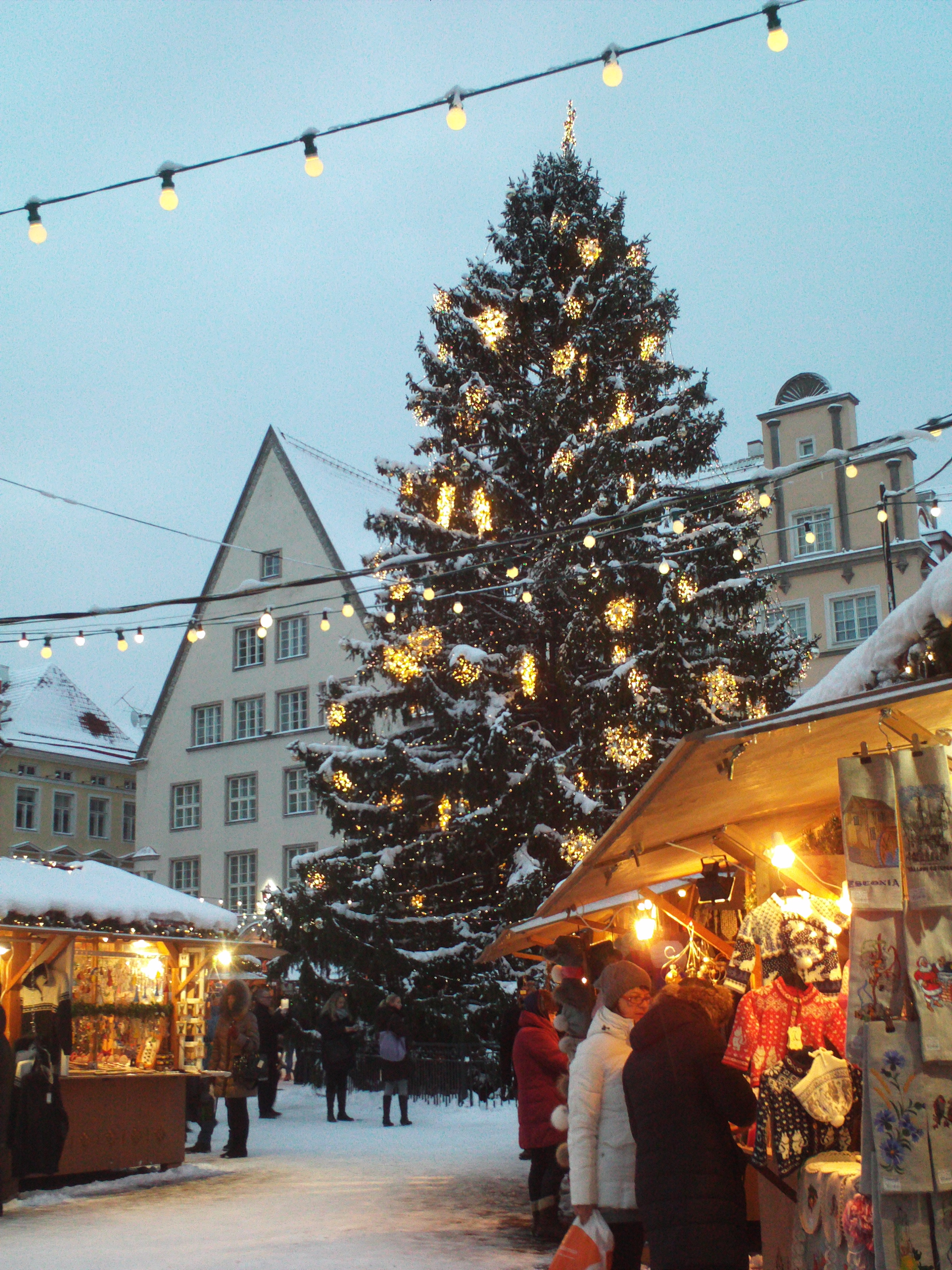
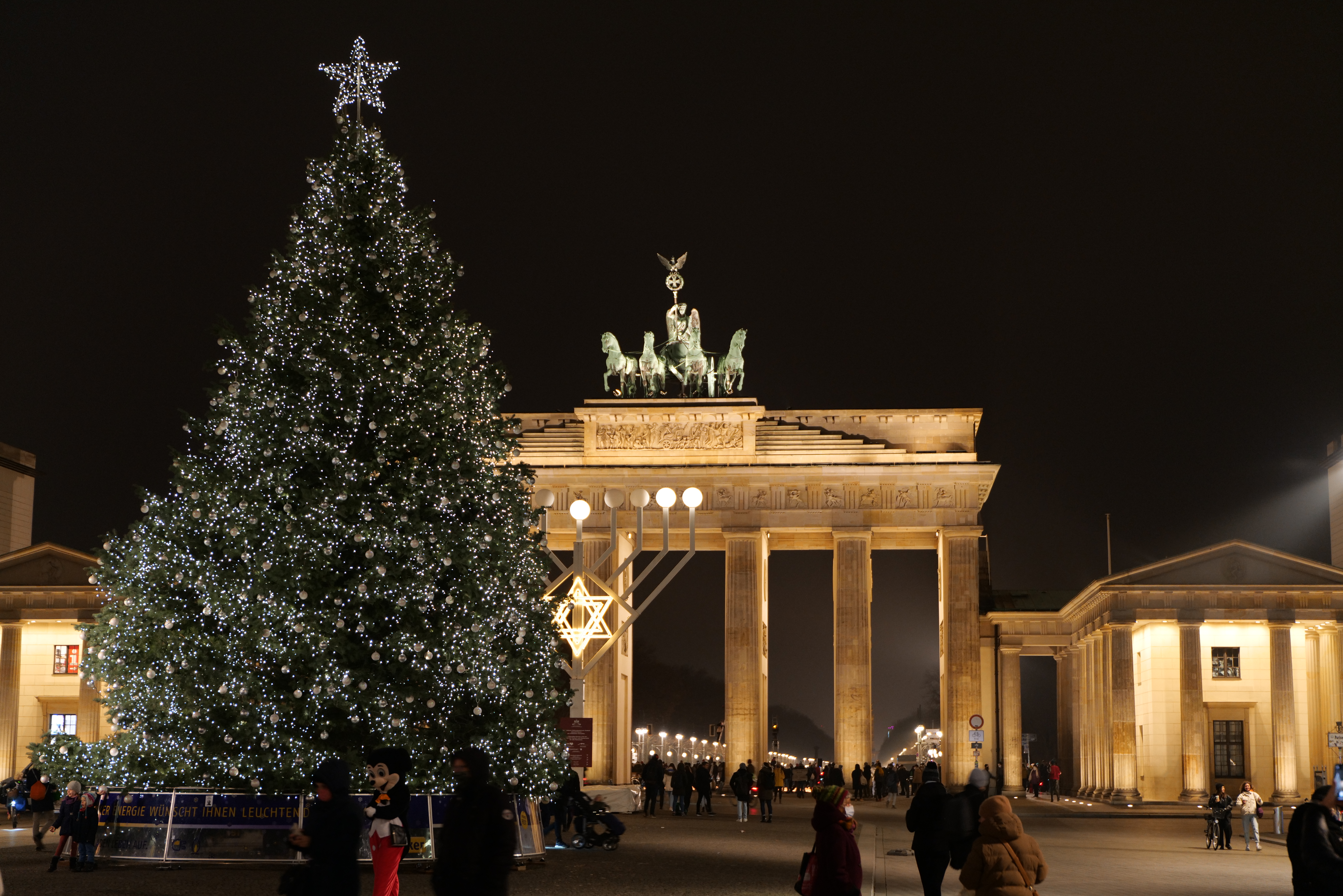
Left: Tallinn Christmas Market in Estonia; Right: Christmas tree with Hanukkah Menorah next to it in Pariser Platz in Berlin, Germany

Customs of erecting decorated trees in winter can be traced to Christmas celebrations in Renaissance-era guilds in Northern Germany and Livonia. The first evidence of decorated trees associated with Christmas Day are trees in guildhalls decorated with sweets to be enjoyed by the apprentices and children. In Livonia (present-day Estonia and Latvia), in 1441, 1442, 1510, and 1514, the Brotherhood of Blackheads erected a tree for the holidays in their guild houses in Reval (now Tallinn) and Riga. On the last night of the celebrations leading up to the holidays, the tree was taken to the Town Hall Square, where the members of the brotherhood danced around it.

A Bremen guild chronicle of 1570 reports that a small tree decorated with "apples, nuts, dates, pretzels, and paper flowers" was erected in the guild-house for the benefit of the guild members' children, who collected the dainties on Christmas Day. In 1584, the pastor and chronicler Balthasar Russow in his Chronica der Provinz Lyfflandt (1584) wrote of an established tradition of setting up a decorated spruce at the market square, where the young men "went with a flock of maidens and women, first sang and danced there and then set the tree aflame".

After the Protestant Reformation, such trees are seen in the houses of upper-class Protestant families as a counterpart to the Catholic Christmas cribs. This transition from the guild hall to bourgeois family homes in the Protestant parts of Germany ultimately gives rise to the modern tradition as it developed in the 18th and 19th centuries. In the present day, the churches and homes of Protestants and Catholics feature both Christmas cribs and Christmas trees.

==== Poland ====
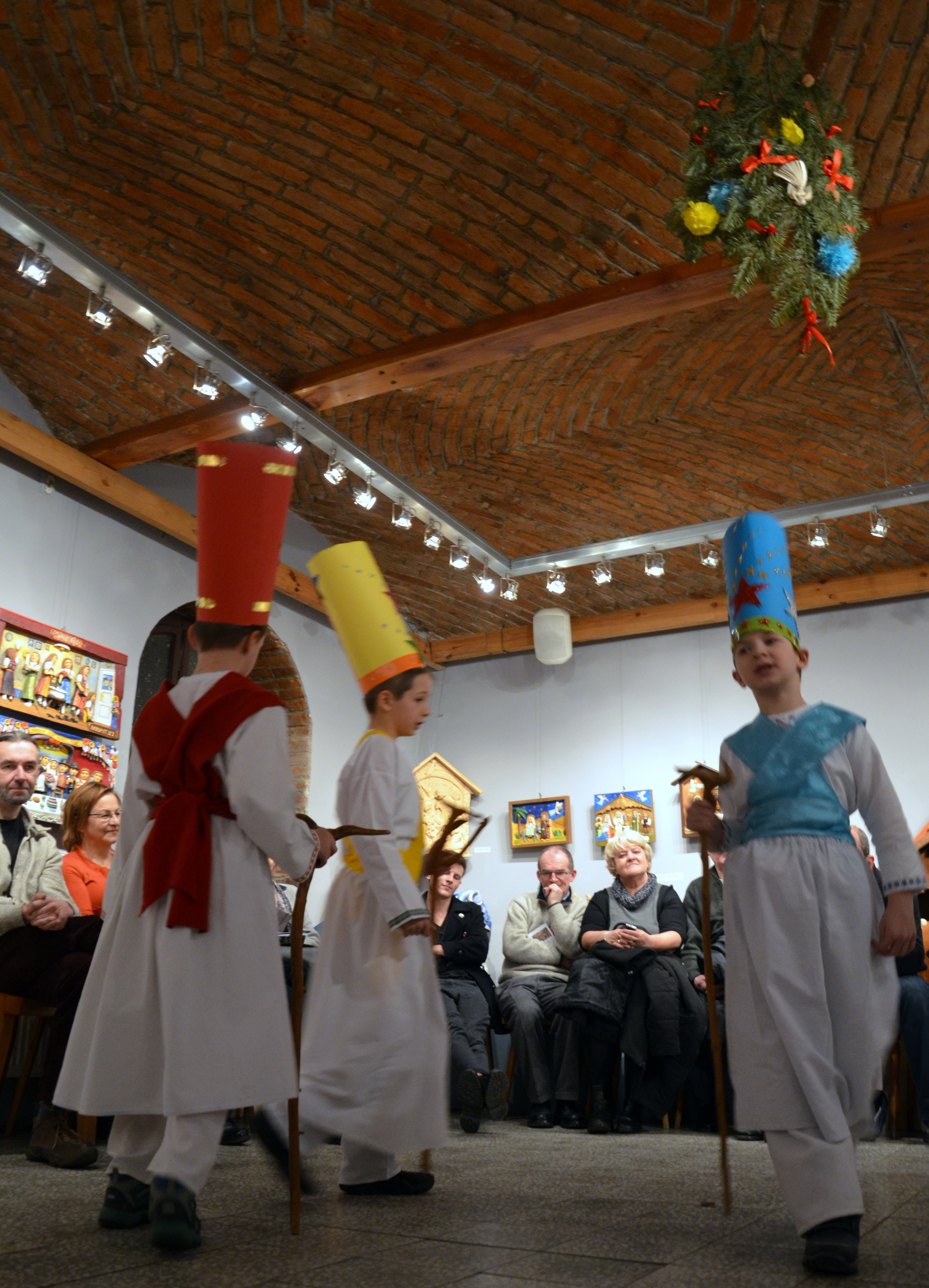
A podłaźniczka hanging from the ceiling rafters

In Poland, there is a folk tradition dating back to an old Slavic pre-Christian custom of suspending a branch of fir, spruce, or pine from the ceiling rafters, called podłaźniczka, during the time of the Koliada winter festival. The branches were decorated with apples, nuts, acorns, and stars made of straw. In more recent times, the decorations also included colored paper cutouts (wycinanki), wafers, cookies, and Christmas baubles. According to old pagan beliefs, the powers of the branch were linked to good harvest and prosperity.

The custom was practiced by Polish peasants until the early 20th century, particularly in the regions of Lesser Poland and Upper Silesia. Most often the branches were hung above the wigilia dinner table on Christmas Eve. Beginning in the mid-19th century, the tradition over time was almost completely replaced by the later German practice of decorating a standing Christmas tree.

=== 18th to early 20th centuries ===
==== Adoption by European nobility ====
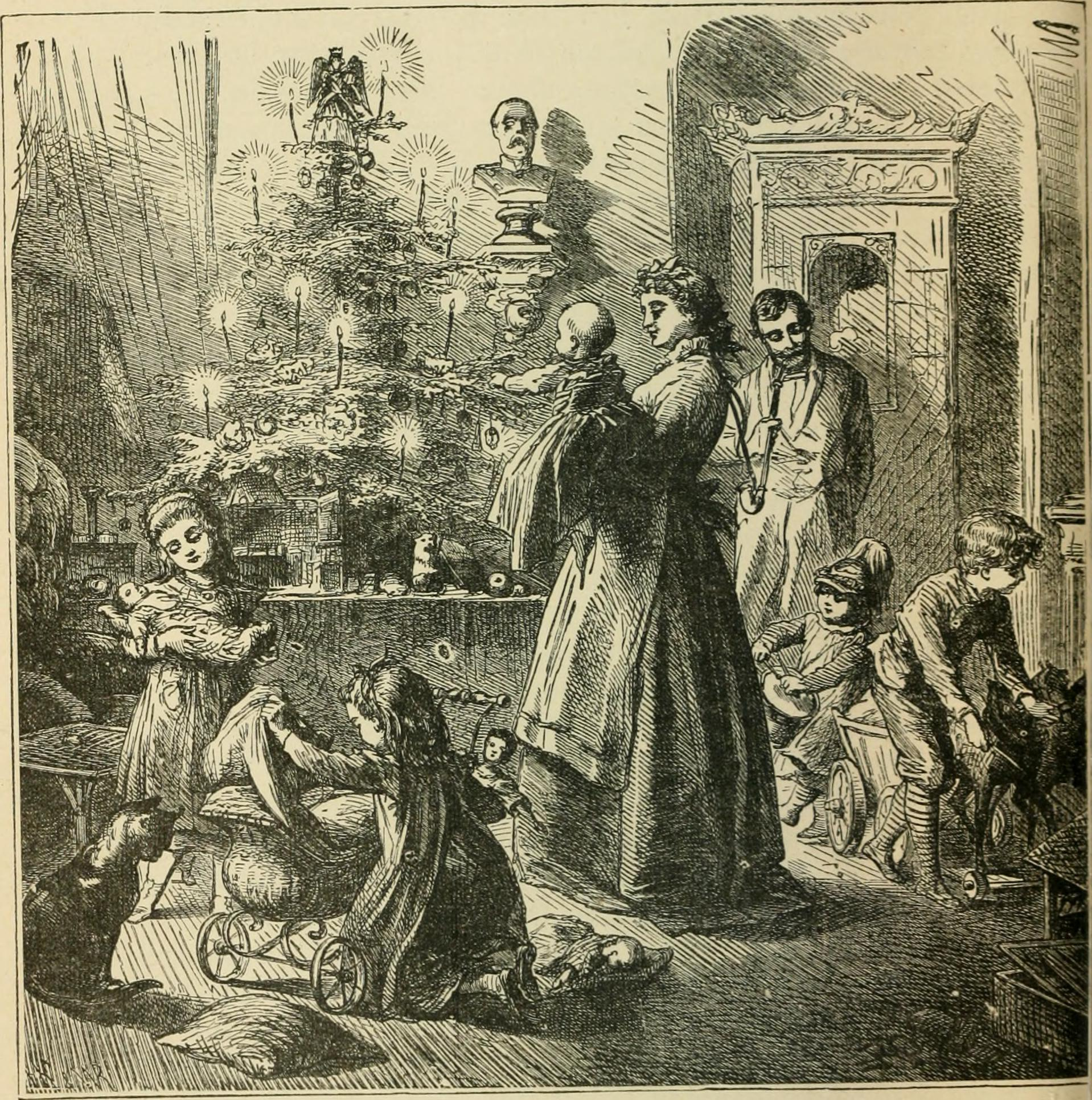
German Christmas tree, book illustration (1888)

In the early 19th century, the custom became popular among the nobility and spread to royal courts as far as Russia. Introduced by Fanny von Arnstein and popularized by Princess Henrietta of Nassau-Weilburg, the Christmas tree reached Vienna in 1814, during the Congress of Vienna, and the custom spread across Austria in the following years. In France, the first Christmas tree was introduced in 1840 by the duchesse d'Orléans. In Denmark, a newspaper company claims that the first attested Christmas tree was lit in 1808 by Countess Wilhemine of Holsteinborg. It was the aging countess who told the story of the first Danish Christmas tree to Danish writer Hans Christian Andersen in 1865. He had published a fairy tale called The Fir-Tree in 1844, recounting the fate of a fir tree being used as a Christmas tree.

==== Adoption by country or region ====
===== Germany =====
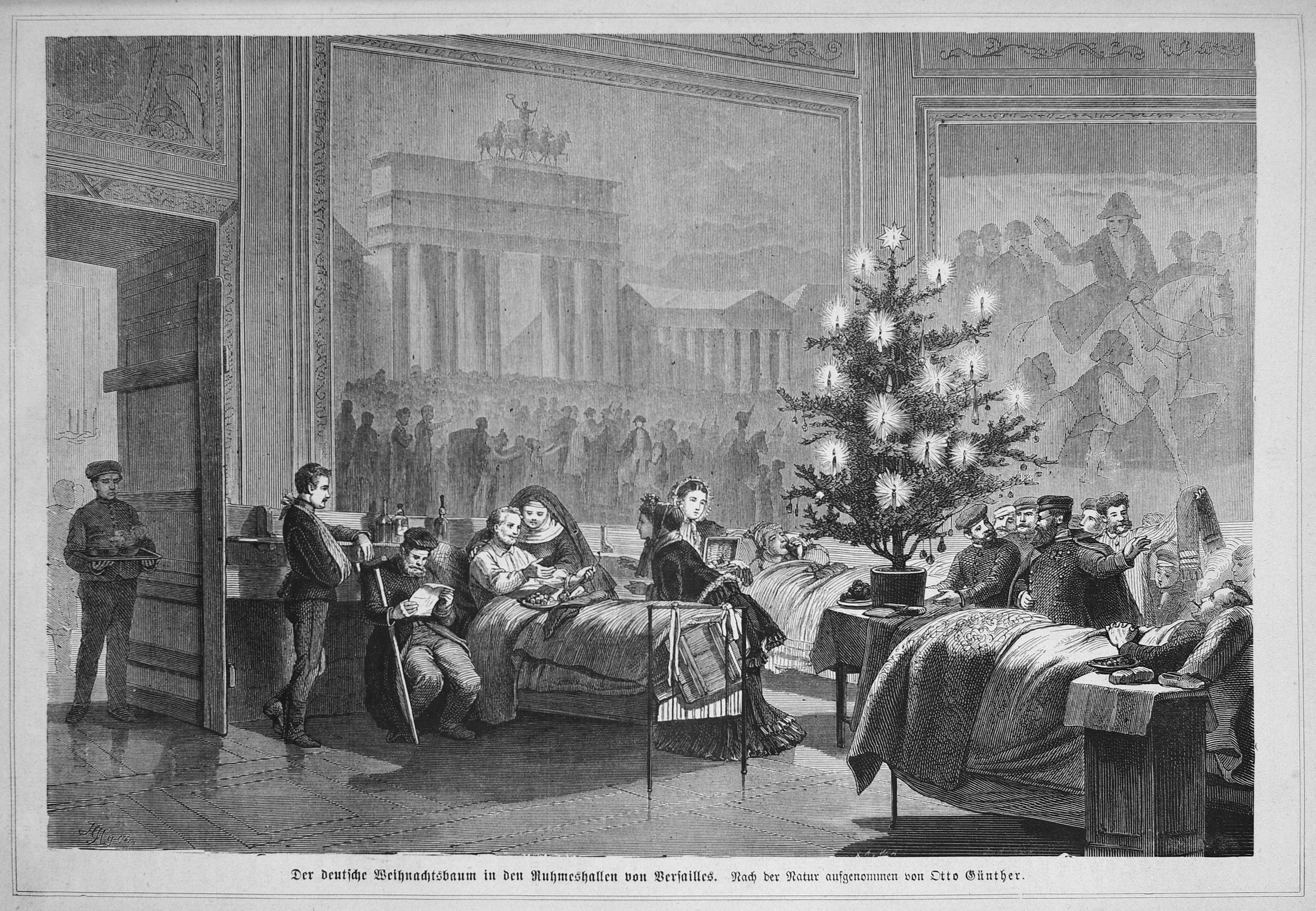
A German Christmas tree in a room at Versailles turned into a military hospital

By the early 18th century, the custom had become common in towns of the upper Rhineland, but it had not yet spread to rural areas. Wax candles, expensive items at the time, are found in attestations from the late 18th century.

Along the Lower Rhine, an area of Roman Catholic majority, the Christmas tree was largely regarded as a Protestant custom. As a result, it remained confined to the upper Rhineland for a relatively long period of time. The custom did eventually gain wider acceptance beginning around 1815 by way of Prussian officials who emigrated there following the Congress of Vienna.

In the 19th century, the Christmas tree was taken to be an expression of German culture and of Gemütlichkeit, especially among emigrants overseas.

A decisive factor in winning general popularity was the German army's decision to place Christmas trees in its barracks and military hospitals during the Franco-Prussian War. Only at the start of the 20th century did Christmas trees appear inside churches, this time in a new brightly lit form.

===== Slovenia =====
Early Slovenian custom, dating back to around the 17th century, was to suspend the tree either upright or upside-down above the well, a corner of the dinner table, in the backyard, or from the fences, modestly decorated with fruits or not decorated at all. German brewer Peter Luelsdorf brought the first Christmas tree of the current tradition to Slovenia in 1845. He set it up in his small brewery inn in Ljubljana, the Slovenian capital. German officials, craftsmen and merchants quickly spread the tradition among the bourgeois population. The trees were typically decorated with walnuts, golden apples, carobs, and candles. At first, the Catholic majority rejected this custom because they considered it a typical Protestant tradition. However, this tradition was almost unknown to the rural population until World War I, after which the decorating of trees became common. The first decorated Christmas market was organized in Ljubljana in 1859.

After World War II, during the Socialist Federal Republic of Yugoslavia period, spruce trees set in the public places (towns, squares, and markets) were, for political reasons, replaced with fir trees, a symbol of socialism and Slavic mythology, strongly associated with loyalty, courage, and dignity. However, spruce retained its popularity in Slovenian homes during those years and came back to public places after independence.

===== Italy =====
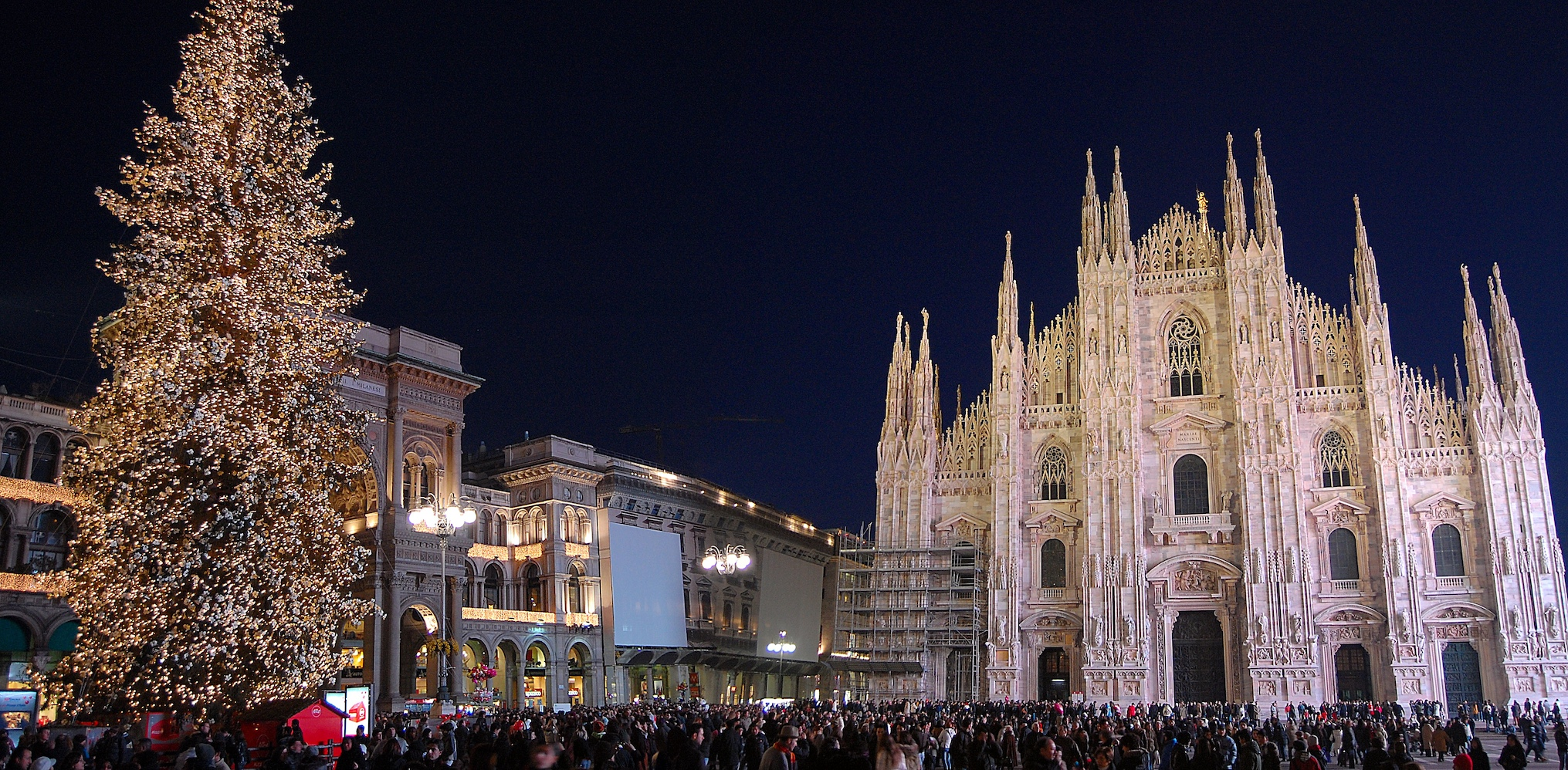
Christmas tree in Milan, Italy, in front of the Milan Cathedral

The Christmas tree tradition in Italy originated from Germanic influences introduced in the late 19th century. Queen Margherita of Savoy erected the first tree at the Quirinal Palace in Rome. Domestic adoption occurred in the 1960s, with families using branches from cypress, oak, or cork trees. Decorations consisted of oranges, clementines, candies, twine, candles, and lanterns. Italians erect trees on 8 December, the Feast of the Immaculate Conception, with exceptions in Milan on 7 December for Saint Ambrose and in Bari on 6 December for Saint Nicholas. Families assemble the tree together; adults position lights, while children place ornaments and the top star or angel. Trees remain until 6 January, the Epiphany. Public displays include the Vatican tree, established in 1982 by Pope John Paul II, and the hillside tree of lights in Gubbio. The light display on Mount Ingino overlooking the city, often called the Mount Ingino Christmas Tree, is sometimes described as the tallest Christmas tree in the world.

===== Britain =====
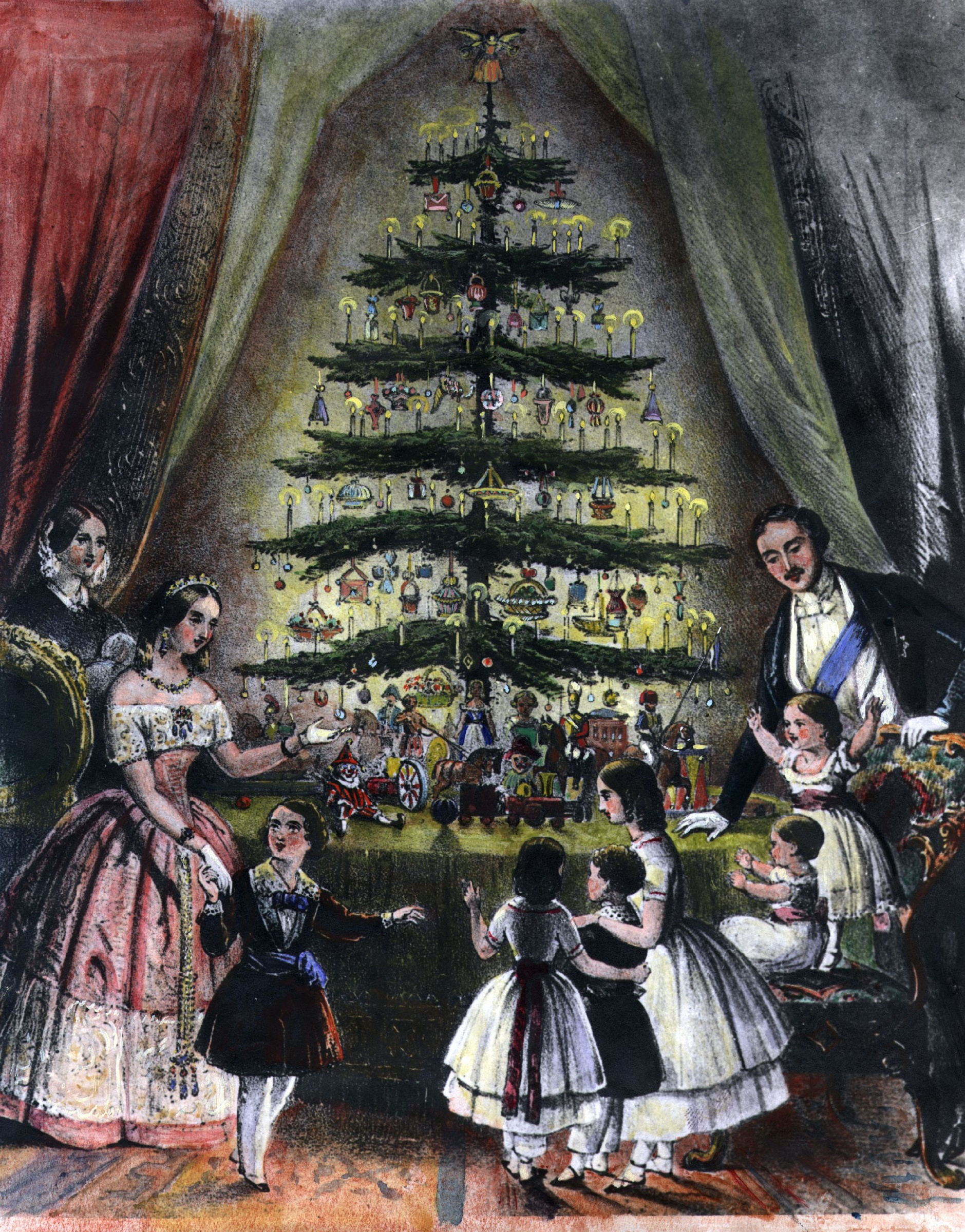
An engraving published in the 1840s of Queen Victoria and Prince Albert created a craze for Christmas trees.

Although the tradition of decorating churches and homes with evergreens at Christmas was long established, the custom of decorating an entire small tree was unknown in Britain until the 19th century. The German-born Queen Charlotte introduced a Christmas tree at a party she gave for children in 1800. The custom did not at first spread much beyond the royal family. (Note: In 1829 the diarist Greville, visiting Panshanger country house, describes three small Christmas trees "such as is customary in Germany", which Princess Lieven had put up.) Queen Victoria, as a child, was familiar with it and a tree was placed in her room every Christmas. In her journal for Christmas Eve 1832, the 13-year-old princess wrote:

After dinner [...] we then went into the drawing room near the dining room [...] There were two large round tables on which were placed two trees hung with lights and sugar ornaments. All the presents being placed round the trees [...]

In the year following Victoria's marriage to her German cousin Prince Albert, in 1841, the custom became even more widespread as wealthier middle-class families followed the fashion. In 1842, a newspaper advertisement for Christmas trees makes clear their smart cachet, German origins and association with children and gift-giving. An illustrated book, The Christmas Tree, describing their use and origins in detail, was on sale in December 1844.

In 1847, Prince Albert wrote: "I must now seek in the children an echo of what Ernest [his brother] and I were in the old time, of what we felt and thought; and their delight in the Christmas trees is not less than ours used to be".

A boost to the trend was given in 1848 when The Illustrated London News, in a report picked up by other papers, described the trees in Windsor Castle in detail and showed the main tree, surrounded by the royal family, on its cover. In fewer than ten years, the adoption of the tradition in middle and upper-class homes was widespread. By 1856, a northern provincial newspaper contained an advert alluding casually to them, as well as reporting the accidental death of a woman whose dress caught fire as she lit the tapers on a Christmas tree. They had not yet spread down the social scale though, as a report from Berlin in 1858 contrasts the situation there where "Every family has its own" with that of Britain, where Christmas trees were still the preserve of the wealthy or the "romantic".

Their use at public entertainments, charity bazaars and in hospitals made them increasingly familiar, and in 1906 a charity was set up specifically to ensure even poor children in London slums "who had never seen a Christmas tree" would enjoy one that year. Anti-German sentiment after World War I briefly reduced their popularity but the effect was short-lived, and by the mid-1920s the use of Christmas trees had spread to all classes. In 1933, a restriction on the importation of foreign trees led to the "rapid growth of a new industry" as the growing of Christmas trees within Britain became commercially viable due to the size of demand. By 2013, the number of trees grown in Britain for the Christmas market was approximately eight million and their display in homes, shops and public spaces a normal part of the Christmas season.

===== Georgia =====
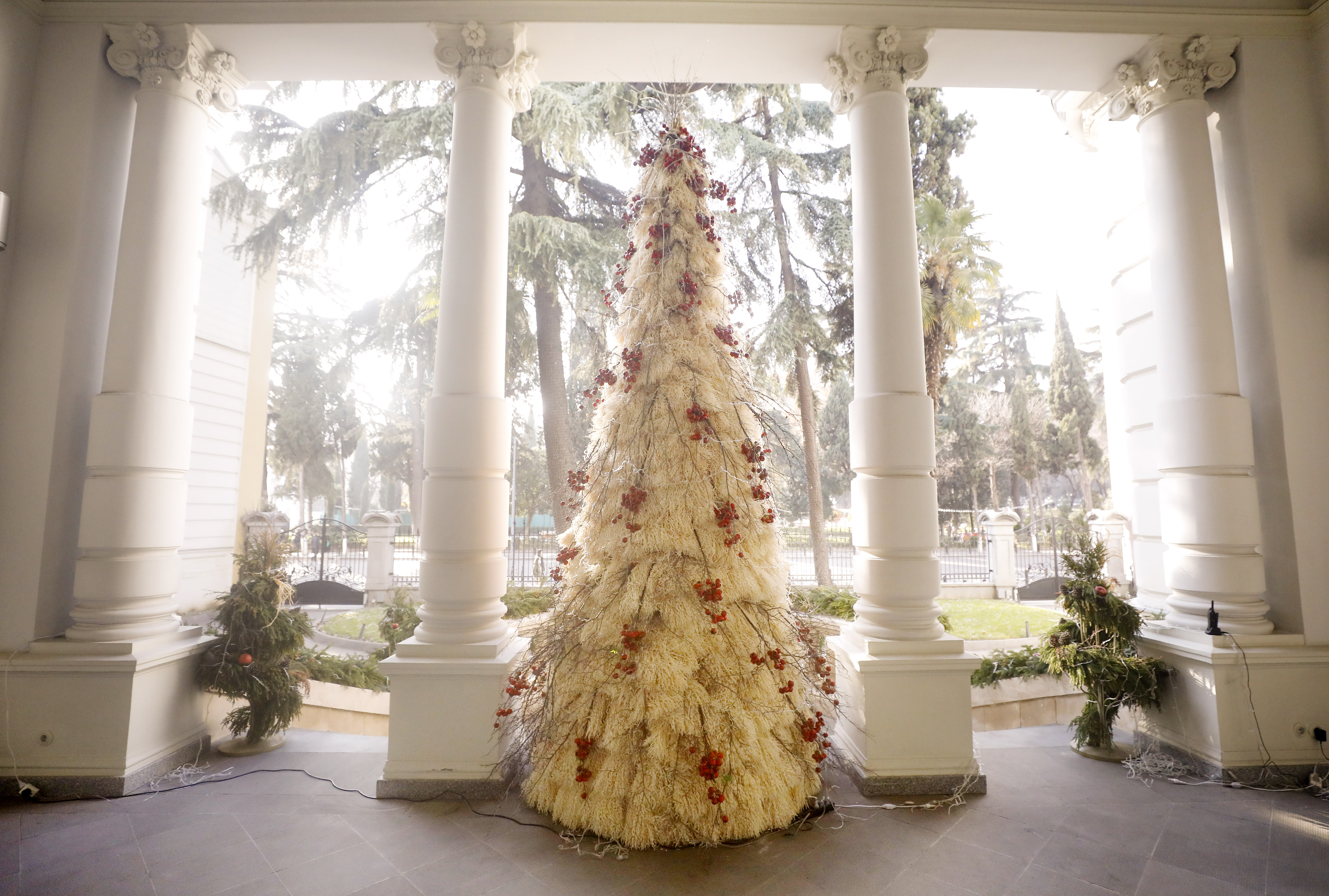
Decorated chichilaki at the Orbeliani Palace

Georgians have their own type of traditional Christmas tree called chichilaki, made from dried up hazelnut or walnut branches that are shaped to form a small coniferous tree. These pale-colored ornaments differ in height from 20 cm (7.9 in) to 3 meters (9.8 ft). Chichilakis are most common in the Guria and Samegrelo regions of Georgia near the Black Sea, but they can also be found in some stores around the capital of Tbilisi.

Georgians believe that the chichilaki resembles the beard of St. Basil the Great, because Eastern Orthodox Church commemorates St. Basil on 1 January.

===== The Bahamas =====
The earliest reference to Christmas trees being used in the Bahamas dates to January 1864 and is associated with the Anglican Sunday Schools in Nassau, New Providence:

After prayers and a sermon from the Rev. R. Swann, the teachers and children of St. Agnes', accompanied by those of St. Mary's, marched to the Parsonage of Rev. J. H. Fisher, in front of which a large Christmas tree had been planted for their gratification. The delighted little ones formed a circle around it singing 'Come follow me to the Christmas tree.'

The gifts decorated the trees as ornaments and the children were given tickets with numbers that matched the gifts. This appears to be the typical way of decorating the trees in 1860s Bahamas. In the Christmas of 1864, there was a Christmas tree put up in the Ladies Saloon in the Royal Victoria Hotel for the respectable children of the neighbourhood. The tree was ornamented with gifts for the children who formed a circle about it and sang the song "Oats and Beans". The gifts were later given to the children in the name of Santa Claus.

===== North America =====
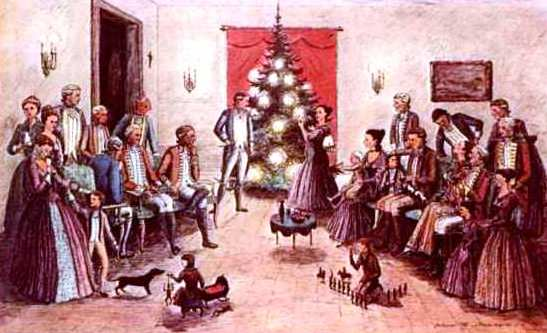
General and Mrs. Riedesel celebrating Christmas

The tradition was introduced to North America in the winter of 1781 by Hessian soldiers stationed in the Province of Québec to garrison the colony against American attack. General Friedrich Adolf Riedesel and his wife, the Baroness von Riedesel, held a Christmas party for the officers at Sorel, Quebec, delighting their guests with a fir tree decorated with candles and fruits.

The Christmas tree became very common in the United States in the early 19th century. Dating from late 1812 or early 1813, the watercolor sketchbooks of John Lewis Krimmel contain perhaps the earliest depictions of a Christmas tree in American art, representing a family celebrating Christmas Eve in the Moravian tradition. The first published image of a Christmas tree appeared in 1836 as the frontispiece to The Stranger's Gift by Hermann Bokum. The first mention of the Christmas tree in American literature was in a story in the 1836 edition of The Token and Atlantic Souvenir, titled "New Year's Day", by Catherine Maria Sedgwick, where she tells the story of a German maid decorating her mistress' tree. Also, a woodcut of the British royal family with their Christmas tree at Windsor Castle, initially published in The Illustrated London News in December 1848, was copied in the United States at Christmas 1850, in Godey's Lady's Book. Godey's copied it exactly, except for the removal of the Queen's tiara and Prince Albert's moustache, to remake the engraving into an American scene. The republished Godey's image became the first widely circulated picture of a decorated evergreen Christmas tree in America. Art historian Karal Ann Marling called Queen Victoria and Prince Albert "the first influential American Christmas tree". Folk-culture historian Alfred Lewis Shoemaker states, "In all of America there was no more important medium in spreading the Christmas tree in the decade 1850–60 than Godey's Lady's Book". The image was reprinted in 1860, and by the 1870s, putting up a Christmas tree had become even more common in America.

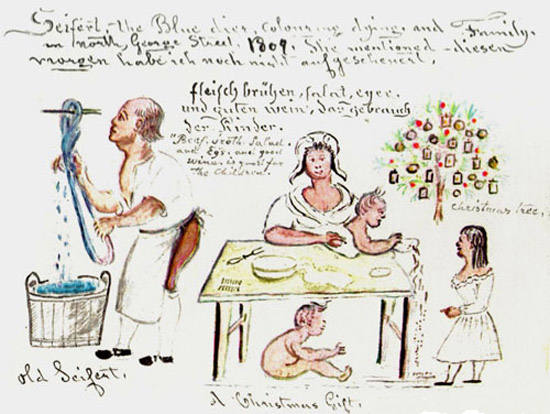
Drawing depicting family with their Christmas tree in 1809

President Benjamin Harrison and his wife Caroline put up the first White House Christmas tree in 1889.

Several cities in the United States with German connections lay claim to that country's first Christmas tree. Windsor Locks, Connecticut, claims that a Hessian soldier put up a Christmas tree in 1777 while imprisoned at the Noden-Reed House, while the "First Christmas Tree in America" is also claimed by Easton, Pennsylvania, where German settlers purportedly erected a Christmas tree in 1816. In his diary, Matthew Zahm of Lancaster, Pennsylvania, recorded the use of a Christmas tree in 1821, leading Lancaster to also lay claim to the first Christmas tree in America. Other accounts credit Charles Follen, a German immigrant to Boston, for being the first to introduce the custom of decorating a Christmas tree to the United States. In 1847, August Imgard, a German immigrant living in Wooster, Ohio cut a blue spruce tree from a woods outside town, had the Wooster village tinsmith construct a star, and placed the tree in his house, decorating it with paper ornaments, gilded nuts and Kuchen. German immigrant Charles Minnigerode, entering into the social life of the Virginia Tidewater in 1842, introduced the German custom of decorating an evergreen tree at Christmas at the home of law professor St. George Tucker, thereby becoming another of many influences that prompted Americans to adopt the practice at about that time. An 1853 article on Christmas customs in Pennsylvania defines them as mostly "German in origin", including the Christmas tree, which is "planted in a flower pot filled with earth, and its branches are covered with presents, chiefly of confectionary, for the younger members of the family." The article distinguishes between customs in different states, however, claiming that in New England generally "Christmas is not much celebrated", whereas in Pennsylvania and New York it is.

When Edward Hibberd Johnson was vice president of the Edison Electric Light Company, a predecessor of General Electric, he created the first known electrically illuminated Christmas tree at his home in New York City in 1882. Johnson became the "Father of Electric Christmas Tree Lights".

The lyrics sung in the United States to the German tune O Tannenbaum begin "O Christmas tree...", giving rise to the mistaken idea that the German word Tannenbaum (fir tree) means "Christmas tree", the German word for which is instead Weihnachtsbaum.

=== 1935 to present ===
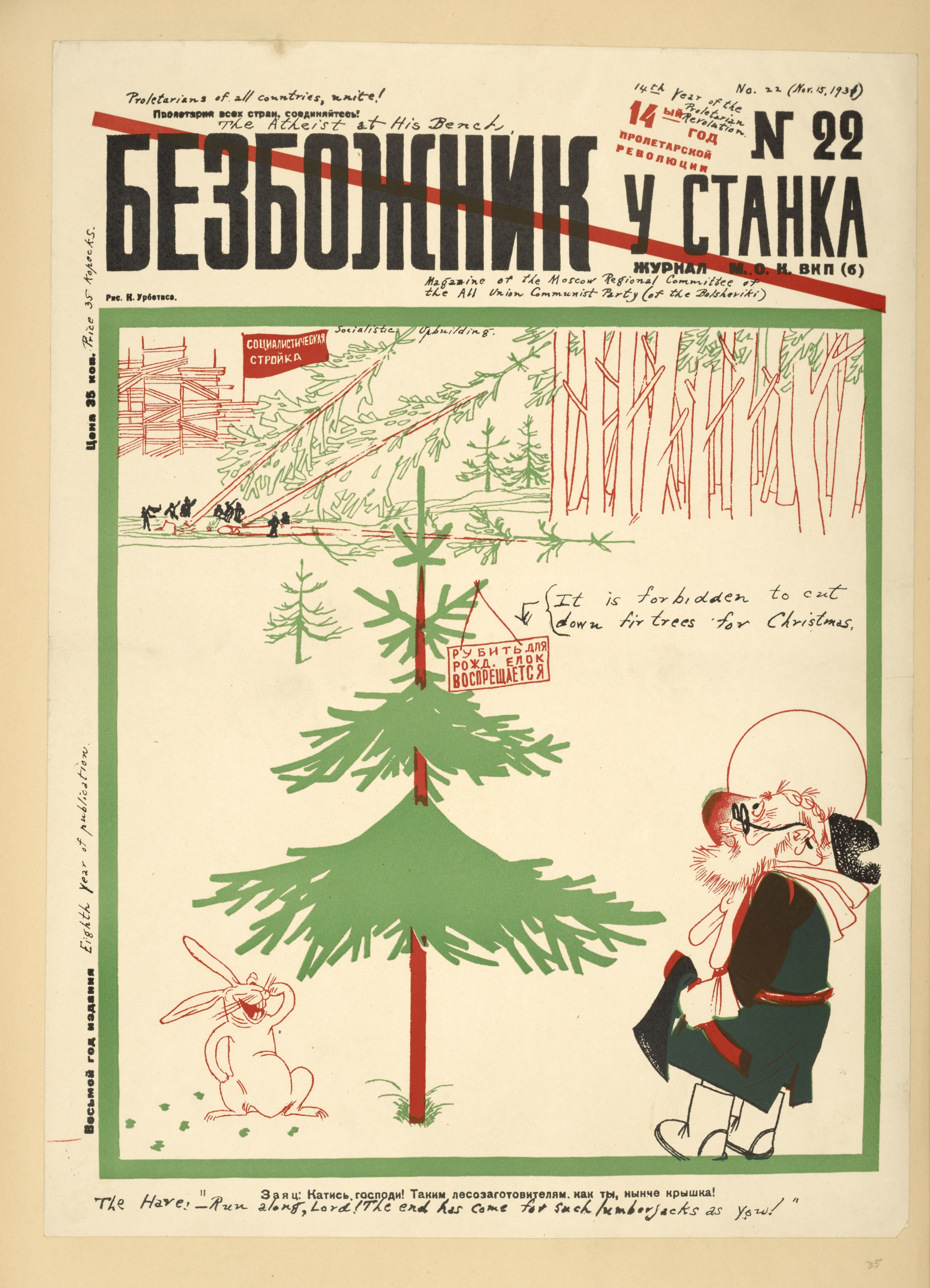
1931 issue of the Soviet magazine Bezbozhnik u Stanka showing an Orthodox priest barred from cutting a Christmas tree

Under the state atheism of the Soviet Union, the Christmas tree—along with the entire celebration of the Christian holiday—was banned as a result of the Soviet anti-religious campaign. The League of Militant Atheists encouraged school pupils to campaign against Christmas traditions, among them being the Christmas tree, as well as other Christian holidays, including Easter; the League established an anti-religious holiday to be the 31st of each month as a replacement. With the Christmas tree being prohibited in accordance with Soviet anti-religious legislation, the government then introduced a "New-Year spruce" (Russian: Новогодняя ёлка, romanized: Novogodnyaya yolka) in 1935 for the New Year holiday. It became a fully secular icon: for example, the crowning star was regarded not as a symbol of the Bethlehem Star, but as the Red star. Secular decorations, such as figurines of airplanes, bicycles, space rockets, cosmonauts, and characters of Russian fairy tales, were also produced. This tradition has persisted after the fall of the USSR, with the New Year holiday outweighing Christmas (7 January) for a wide majority of Russian people.

The Peanuts TV special A Charlie Brown Christmas (1965) was influential on the pop culture surrounding the Christmas tree. Aluminum Christmas trees were popular during the early 1960s in the US. They were satirized in the TV special and came to be seen as symbolizing the commercialization of Christmas. The term "Charlie Brown Christmas tree," describing any poor-looking or malformed tree, especially a small one, also derives from the 1965 TV special, based on the appearance of Charlie Brown's Christmas tree.

==== Public Christmas trees ====
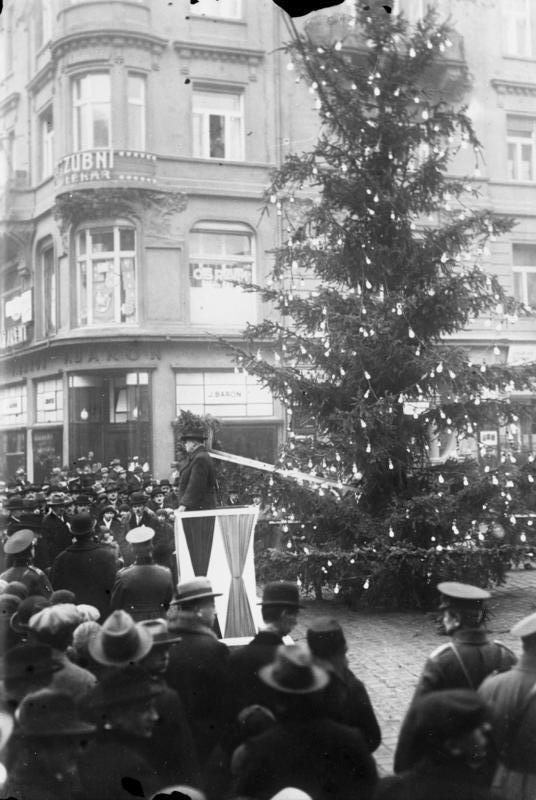
An early example of public Christmas tree for the children of unemployed parents in Prague (Czech Republic), 1931

Since the early 20th century, it has become common in many cities, towns, and department stores to put up public Christmas trees outdoors, such as the Macy's Great Tree in Atlanta (since 1948), the Rockefeller Center Christmas Tree in New York City, and the large Christmas tree at Victoria Square in Adelaide.

The use of fire retardant allows many indoor public areas to display real trees while remaining code-compliant. Licensed applicators of fire retardant solution spray the tree, tag it, and provide a certificate for inspection.

The United States' National Christmas Tree has been lit each year since 1923 on the South Lawn of the White House, becoming part of what evolved into a major holiday event at the White House. President Jimmy Carter lit only the crowning star atop the tree in 1979 in honor of the Americans being held hostage in Iran. This was repeated in 1980, except the tree was fully lit for 417 seconds, one second for each day the hostages had been in captivity.

In some cities, a charity event called the Festival of Trees is organized, in which multiple trees are decorated and displayed.

The giving of Christmas trees has also often been associated with the end of hostilities. After the signing of the Armistice in 1918, the city of Manchester, England, sent a tree, and £500 to buy chocolate and cakes, for the children of the much-bombarded town of Lille in northern France.

In some cases, the trees represent special commemorative gifts, such as in Trafalgar Square in London, where the City of Oslo, Norway, presents a tree to the people of London as a token of appreciation for the British support of Norwegian resistance during World War II; in Boston, United States, where the tree is a gift from the province of Nova Scotia, in thanks for rapid deployment of supplies and rescuers to the 1917 ammunition ship explosion that leveled the city of Halifax; and in Newcastle upon Tyne, England, where the main civic Christmas tree is an annual gift from the city of Bergen, Norway, in thanks for the part played by soldiers from Newcastle in liberating Bergen from Nazi occupation. Norway also annually gifts a Christmas tree to Washington, D.C., as a symbol of friendship between Norway and the US and as an expression of gratitude from Norway for the help received from the US during World War II.

== Customs and traditions ==
=== Setting up and taking down ===
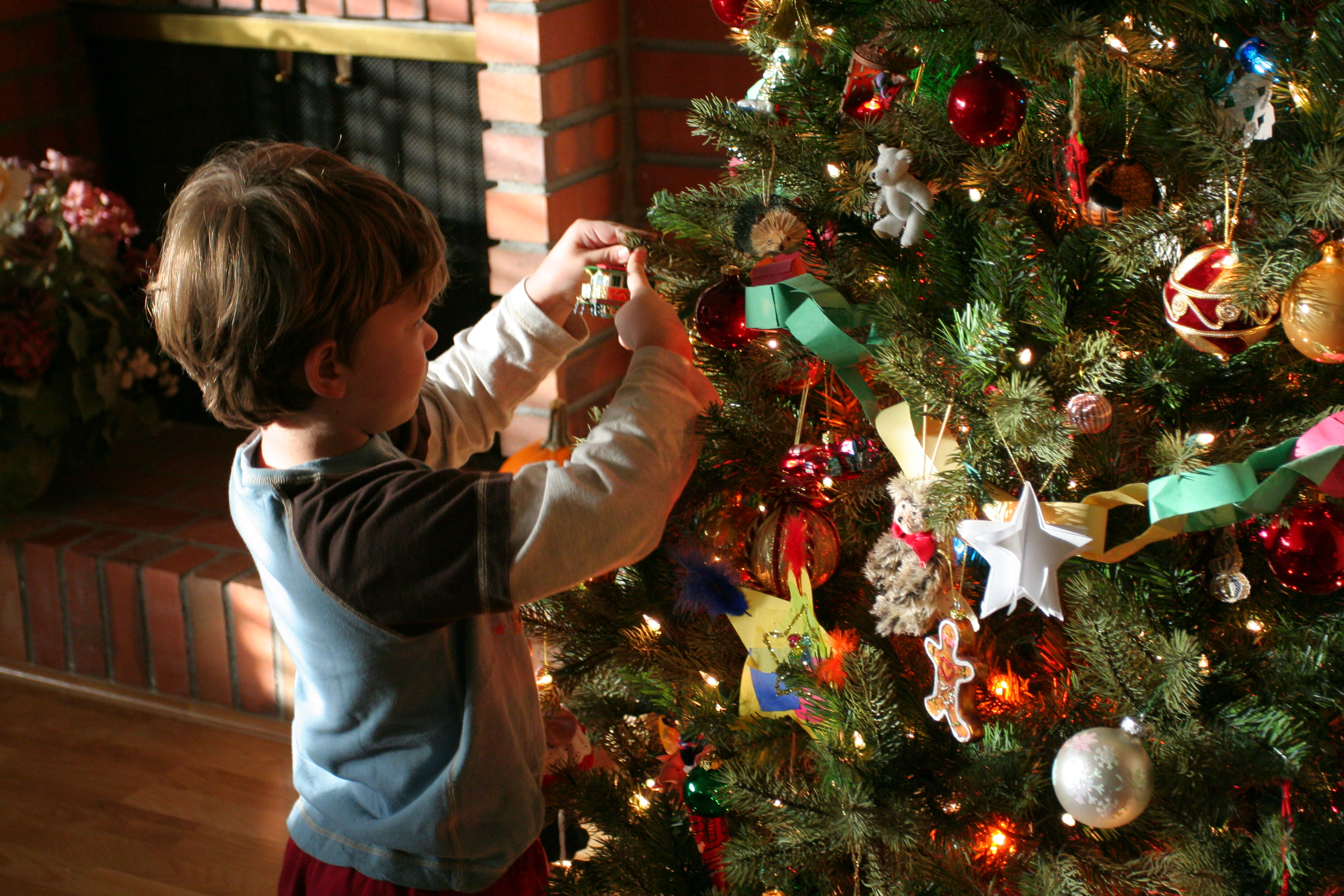
Adding decorations to tree

Both setting up and taking down a Christmas tree are associated with specific dates; liturgically, this is done through the hanging of the greens ceremony. In many areas, it has become customary to set up one's Christmas tree on Advent Sunday, the first day of the Advent season. Traditionally, however, in some regions or countries as in Australia, Christmas trees were not brought in and decorated until the evening of Christmas Eve (24 December), the end of the Advent season and the start of the twelve days of Christmastide. It is customary for Christians in many localities to remove their Christmas decorations on the last day of the twelve days of Christmastide that falls on 5 January—Epiphany Eve (Twelfth Night), although those in other Christian countries remove them on Candlemas, the conclusion of the extended Christmas-Epiphany season (Epiphanytide). According to the first tradition, those who fail to remember to remove their Christmas decorations on Epiphany Eve must leave them untouched until Candlemas, the second opportunity to remove them; failure to observe this custom is considered inauspicious.

=== Decorations ===
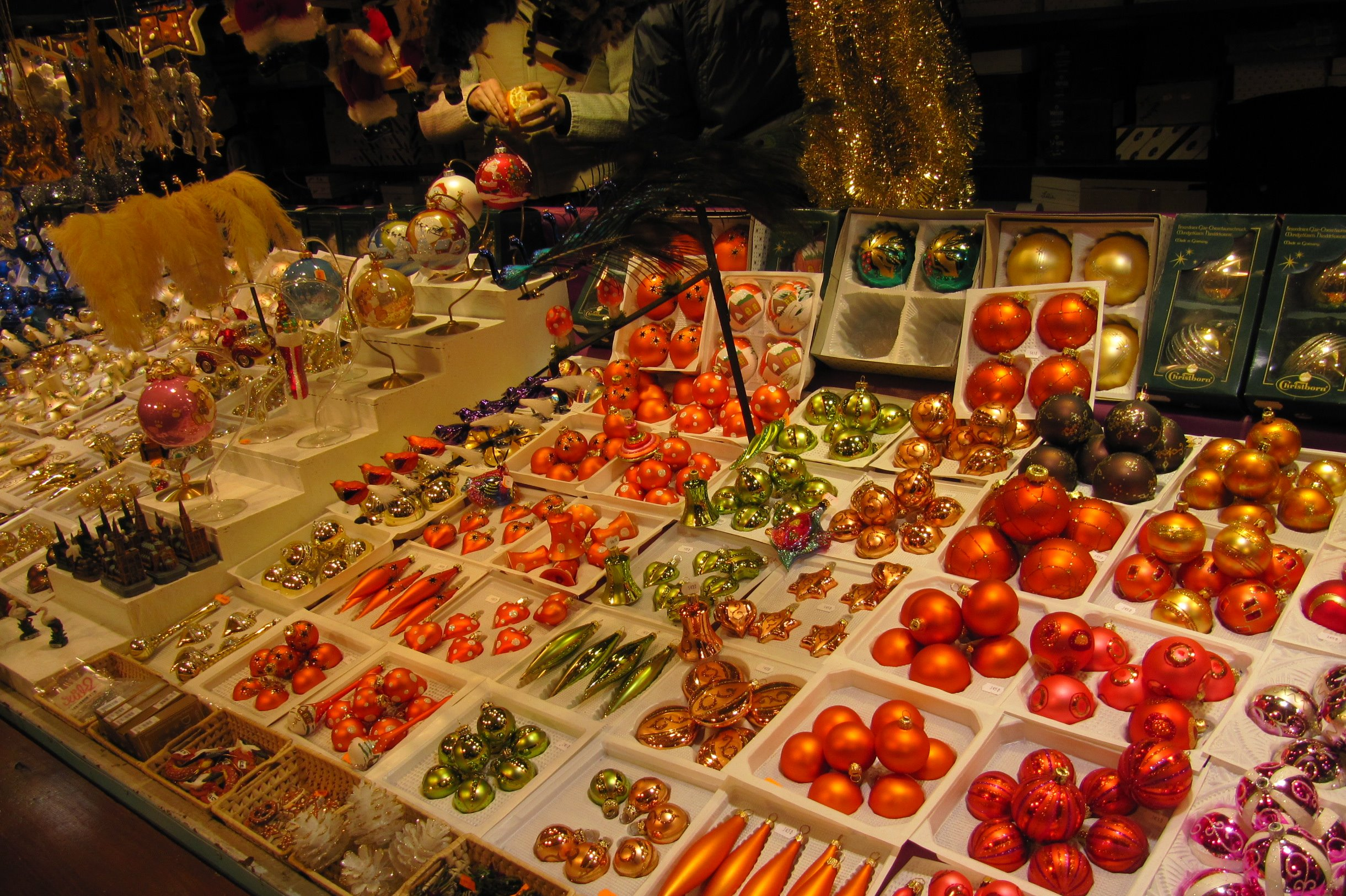
Christmas ornaments at the Christmas market, Strasbourg

Christmas ornaments are decorations (usually made of glass, metal, wood, or ceramics) that are used to decorate a Christmas tree. The first decorated trees were adorned with apples, white candy canes and pastries in the shapes of stars, hearts and flowers. Edible decorations such as gingerbread, chocolate, and other sweets are also sometimes tied to or hung from the tree's branches with ribbons. Glass baubles were first made in Lauscha, Germany, in 1847, along with garlands of glass beads and tin figures that could be hung on trees. The popularity of these decorations fueled the production of glass figures made by highly skilled artisans with clay molds.

Tinsel and several types of garland or ribbon are commonly used as Christmas tree decorations. Silvered saran-based tinsel was introduced later. Delicate mold-blown and painted colored glass Christmas ornaments were a specialty of the glass factories in the Thuringian Forest, especially in Lauscha in the late 19th century, and have since become a large industry, complete with famous-name designers. Baubles are another common decoration, consisting of small hollow glass or plastic spheres coated with a thin metallic layer to make them reflective, with a further coating of a thin pigmented polymer in order to provide coloration.

Lighting with electric lights (Christmas lights or, in the United Kingdom, fairy lights) is commonly done. A tree-topper, typically an angel or a star, is traditionally placed at the highest point to complete the decoration. The angel decoration is commonly understood as representing the angel Gabriel, while the star represents the Star of Bethlehem described in the accounts of the Nativity of Jesus.

In the late 1800s, home-made white Christmas trees were made by wrapping strips of cotton batting around leafless branches creating the appearance of a snow-laden tree.

In the 1940s and 1950s, popularized by Hollywood films in the late 1930s, flocking was very popular on the West Coast of the United States. There were home flocking kits that could be used with vacuum cleaners. In the 1980s, some trees were sprayed with fluffy white flocking to simulate snow.

== Symbolism and interpretations ==
The earliest legend of the origin of a fir tree becoming a Christian symbol dates back to 723 AD, involving Saint Boniface as he was evangelizing Germany. It is said that at a pagan gathering in Geismar, where a group of people dancing under a decorated oak tree were about to sacrifice a baby in the name of Thor, Saint Boniface took an axe and called on the name of Jesus. In one swipe, he took down the entire oak tree, to the crowd's astonishment. Behind the fallen tree was a baby fir tree. Boniface said, "let this tree be the symbol of the true God, its leaves are ever green and will not die." The tree's needles pointed heavenward and it was shaped triangularly, representing the Holy Trinity.

When decorating the Christmas tree, many individuals place a star at the top of the tree, symbolizing the Star of Bethlehem. It became popular for people to also use an angel to top the Christmas tree in order to symbolize the angels mentioned in the accounts of the Nativity of Jesus. Additionally, in the context of a Christian celebration of Christmas, the evergreen Christmas tree symbolizes eternal life; the candles or lights on the tree represent Christ as the light of the world.

== Production ==
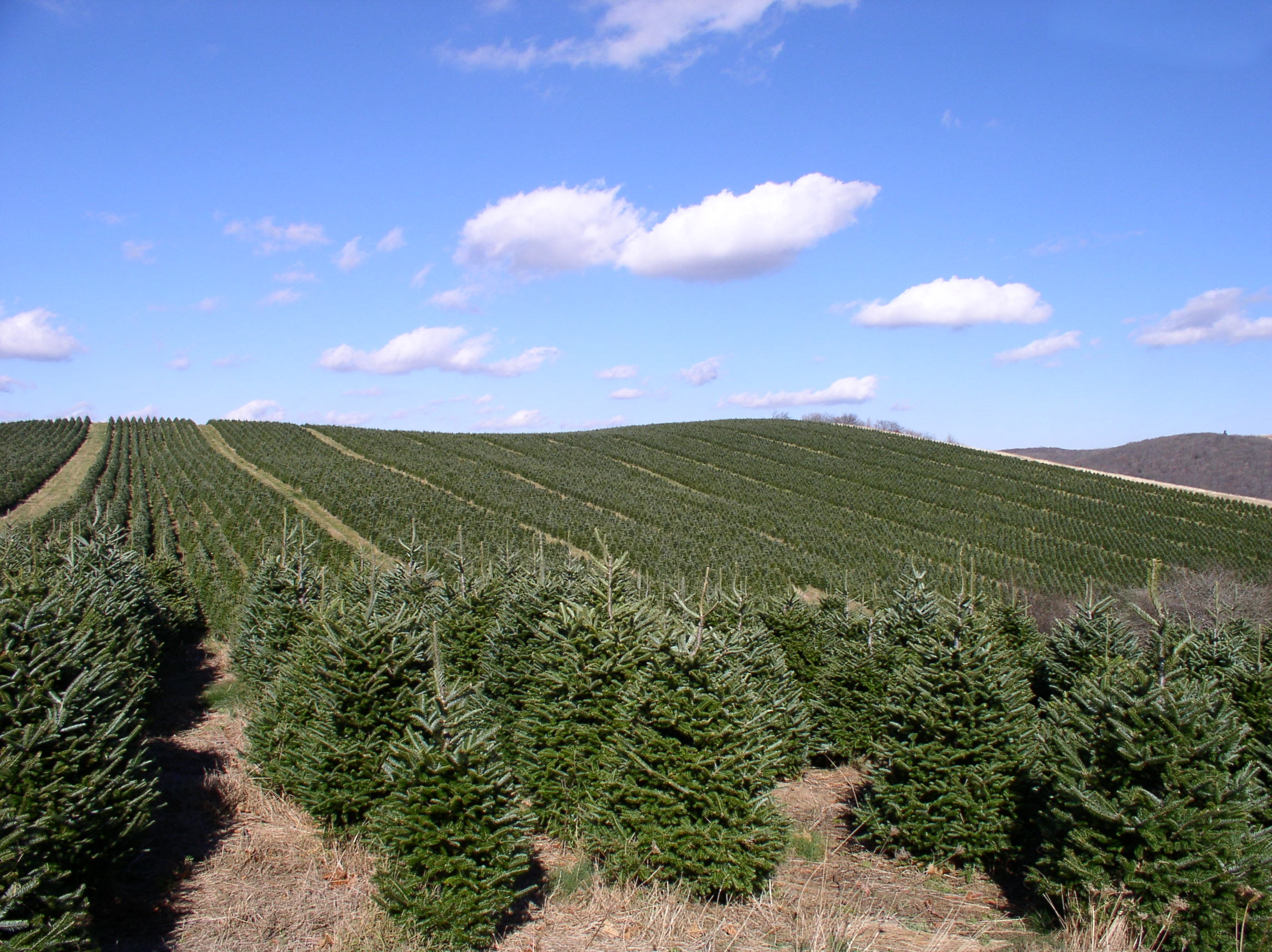
A large scale Christmas tree farm in the United States

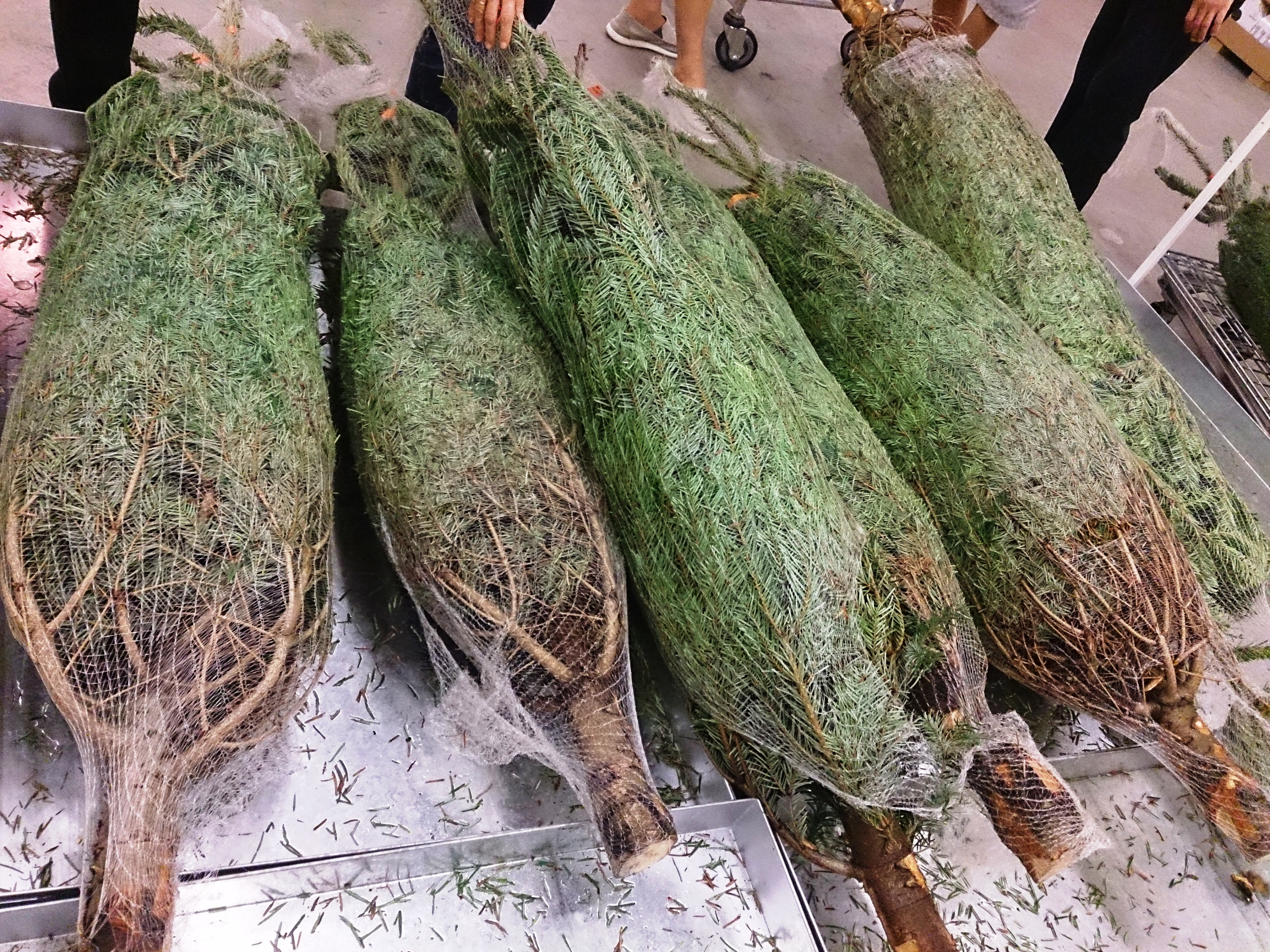
Undecorated Christmas trees for sale

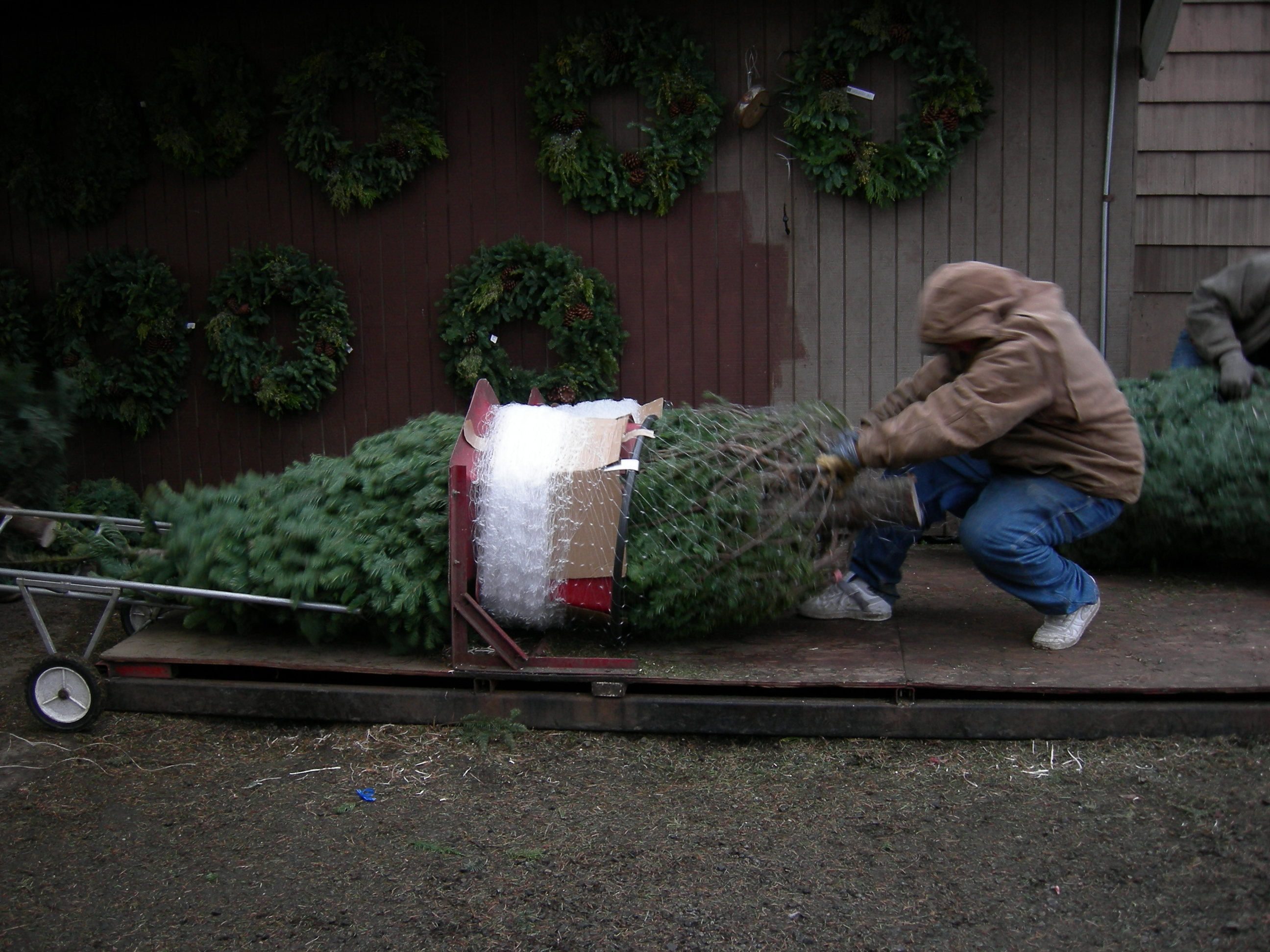
Baling a tree

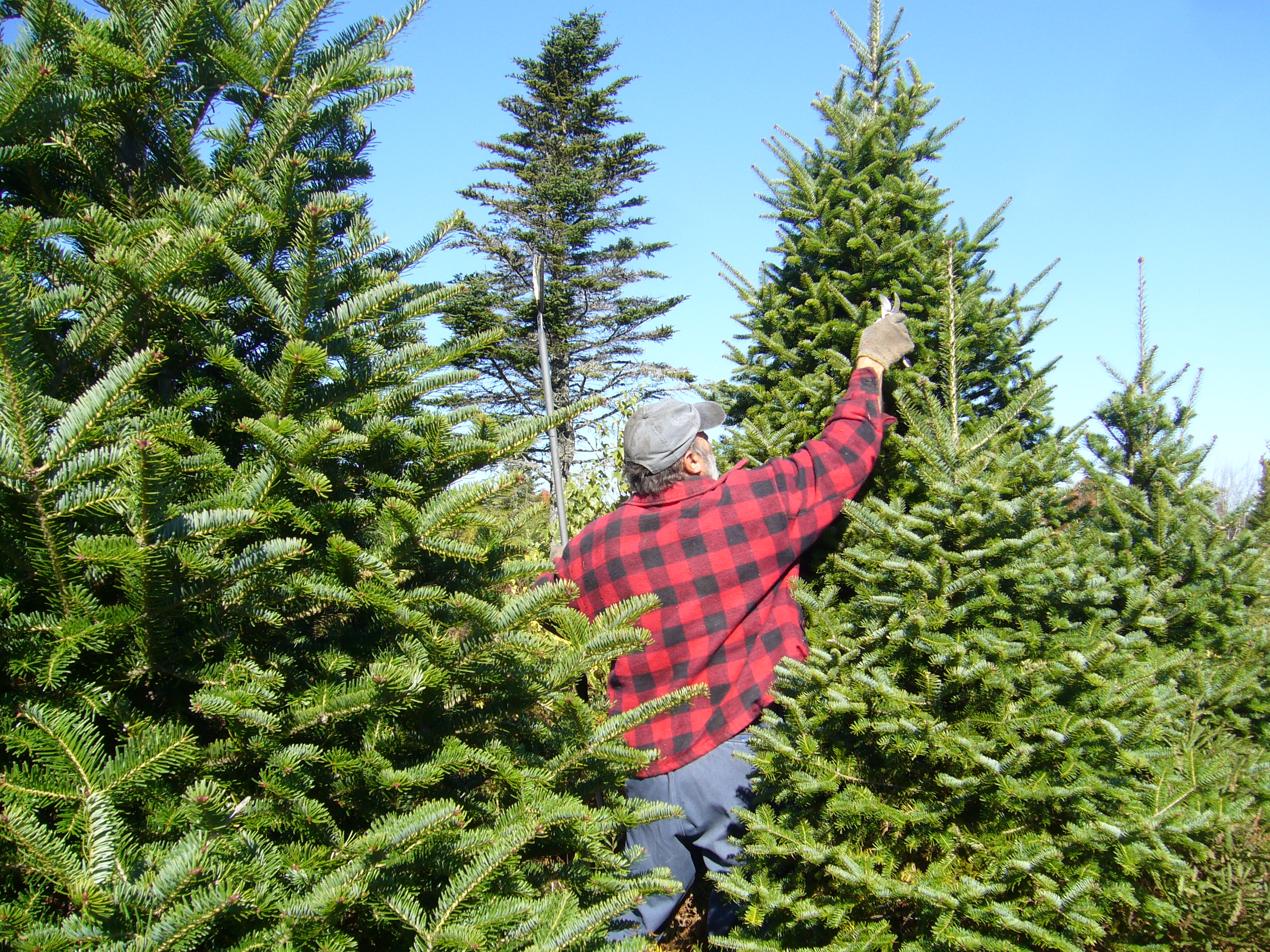
A grower in Waterloo, Nova Scotia, prunes balsam fir trees in October. The tree must experience three frosts to stabilize the needles before cutting.

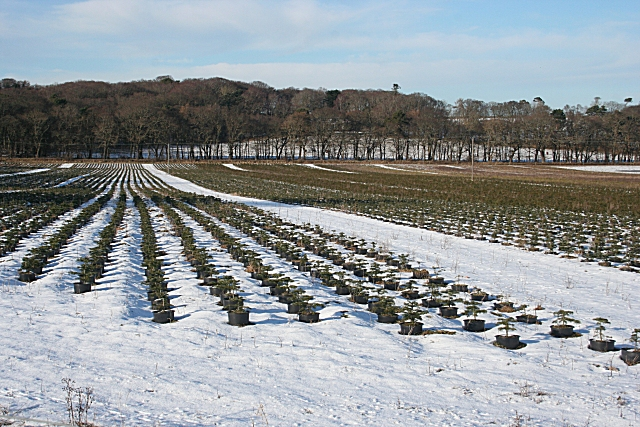
Christmas Tree Nursery in Scotland. Each of the hundreds of young trees in serried ranks here is in a black flowerpot, so presumably they are destined for eventual sale as Christmas trees in pots.

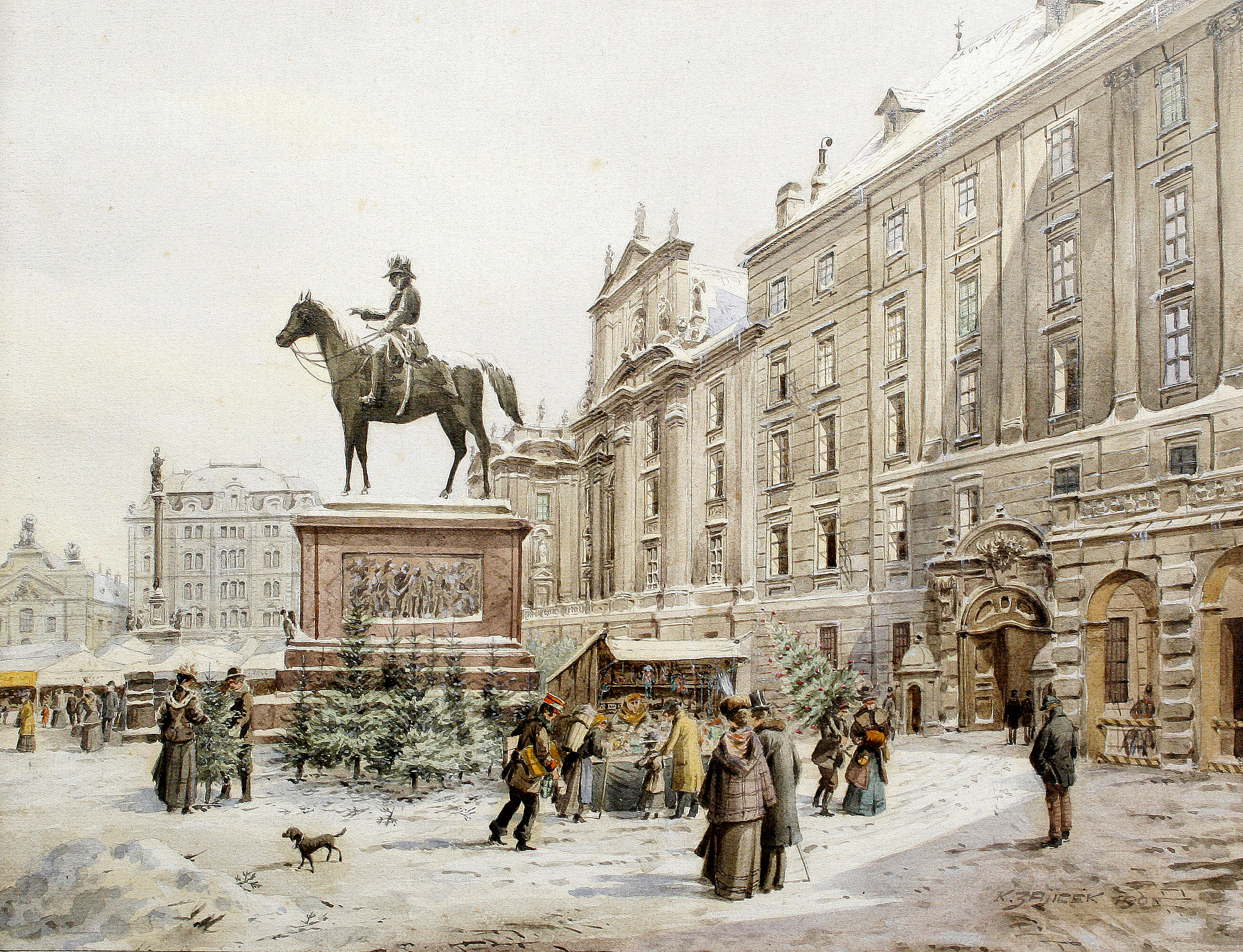
Trees on sale at a Christmas market in Vienna, painting by Carl Wenzel Zajicek (1908)

Each year, 33 to 36 million Christmas trees are produced in the United States, and 50 to 60 million are produced in Europe. In 1998, there were about 15,000 growers in America (a third of them "choose and cut" farms). In that same year, it was estimated that Americans spent $1.5 billion on Christmas trees. By 2016, that had climbed to $2.04 billion for natural trees and a further $1.86 billion for artificial trees. In Europe, 75 million trees worth €2.4 billion ($3.2 billion) are harvested annually.

=== Natural trees ===
The most commonly used species are fir (Abies), which have the benefit of not shedding their needles when they dry out, as well as retaining good foliage color and scent; but species in other genera are also used.

In northern Europe most commonly used are:

- Norway spruce Picea abies (the original tree, generally the cheapest)
- Silver fir Abies alba
- Nordmann fir Abies nordmanniana
- Noble fir Abies procera
- Serbian spruce Picea omorika
- Scots pine Pinus sylvestris
- Stone pine Pinus pinea (as small table-top trees)
- Swiss pine Pinus cembra

In North America, Central America, South America and Australia, most commonly used are:

- Douglas fir Pseudotsuga menziesii
- Balsam fir Abies balsamea
- Fraser Fir Abies fraseri
- Grand fir Abies grandis
- Guatemalan fir Abies guatemalensis
- Noble fir Abies procera
- Nordmann fir Abies nordmanniana
- Red fir Abies magnifica
- White fir Abies concolor
- Pinyon pine Pinus edulis
- Jeffrey pine Pinus jeffreyi
- Scots pine Pinus sylvestris
- Stone pine Pinus pinea (as small table-top trees)
- Norfolk Island pine Araucaria heterophylla
- Paraná pine Araucaria angustifolia (when young, resembles a Pine tree)

Several other species are used to a lesser extent. Less-traditional conifers are sometimes used, such as giant sequoia, Leyland cypress, Monterey cypress, and eastern juniper. Various types of spruce tree are also used for Christmas trees (including the blue spruce and, less commonly, the white spruce), but spruces begin to lose their needles rapidly upon being cut, and spruce needles are often sharp, making decorating uncomfortable. Virginia pine is still available on some tree farms in the southeastern United States; however, its winter color is faded. The long-needled eastern white pine is also used there, though it is an unpopular Christmas tree in most parts of the country, owing also to its faded winter coloration and limp branches, making decorating difficult with all but the lightest ornaments. Norfolk Island pine is sometimes used, particularly in Oceania, and in Australia, some species of the genera Casuarina and Allocasuarina are also occasionally used as Christmas trees. But, by far, the most common tree is the Pinus radiata Monterey pine. Adenanthos sericeus or Albany woolly bush is commonly sold in southern Australia as a potted living Christmas tree. Hemlock species are generally considered unsuitable as Christmas trees due to their poor needle retention and inability to support the weight of lights and ornaments.

Some trees, frequently referred to as "living Christmas trees", are sold live with roots and soil, often from a plant nursery, to be stored at nurseries in planters or planted later outdoors and enjoyed (and often decorated) for years or decades. Others are produced in a container and sometimes as topiary for a porch or patio. However, when done improperly, the combination of root loss caused by digging, and the indoor environment of high temperature and low humidity is very detrimental to the tree's health; additionally, the warmth of an indoor climate will bring the tree out of its natural winter dormancy, leaving it little protection when put back outside into a cold outdoor climate. Often Christmas trees are a large attraction for living animals, including mice and spiders. Thus, the survival rate of these trees is low. When done properly, replanting provides higher survival rates.

European tradition prefers the open aspect of naturally grown, unsheared trees, while in North America (outside western areas where trees are often wild-harvested on public lands) there is a preference for close-sheared trees with denser foliage, but less space to hang decorations.

In the past, Christmas trees were often harvested from wild forests, but now almost all are commercially grown on tree farms. Almost all Christmas trees in the United States are grown on Christmas tree farms where they are cut after about ten years of growth and new trees planted. According to the United States Department of Agriculture's agriculture census for 2007, 21,537 farms were producing conifers for the cut Christmas tree market in America, 5,717.09 square kilometres (1,412,724 acres) were planted in Christmas trees.

The life cycle of a Christmas tree from the seed to a 2-metre (7 ft) tree takes, depending on species and treatment in cultivation, between eight and twelve years. First, the seed is extracted from cones harvested from older trees. These seeds are then usually grown in nurseries and then sold to Christmas tree farms at an age of three to four years. The remaining development of the tree greatly depends on the climate, soil quality, as well as the cultivation and how the trees are tended by the Christmas tree farmer. One issue that farmers face is the destruction of pine trees by pests, such as T. piniperda.

=== Artificial trees ===
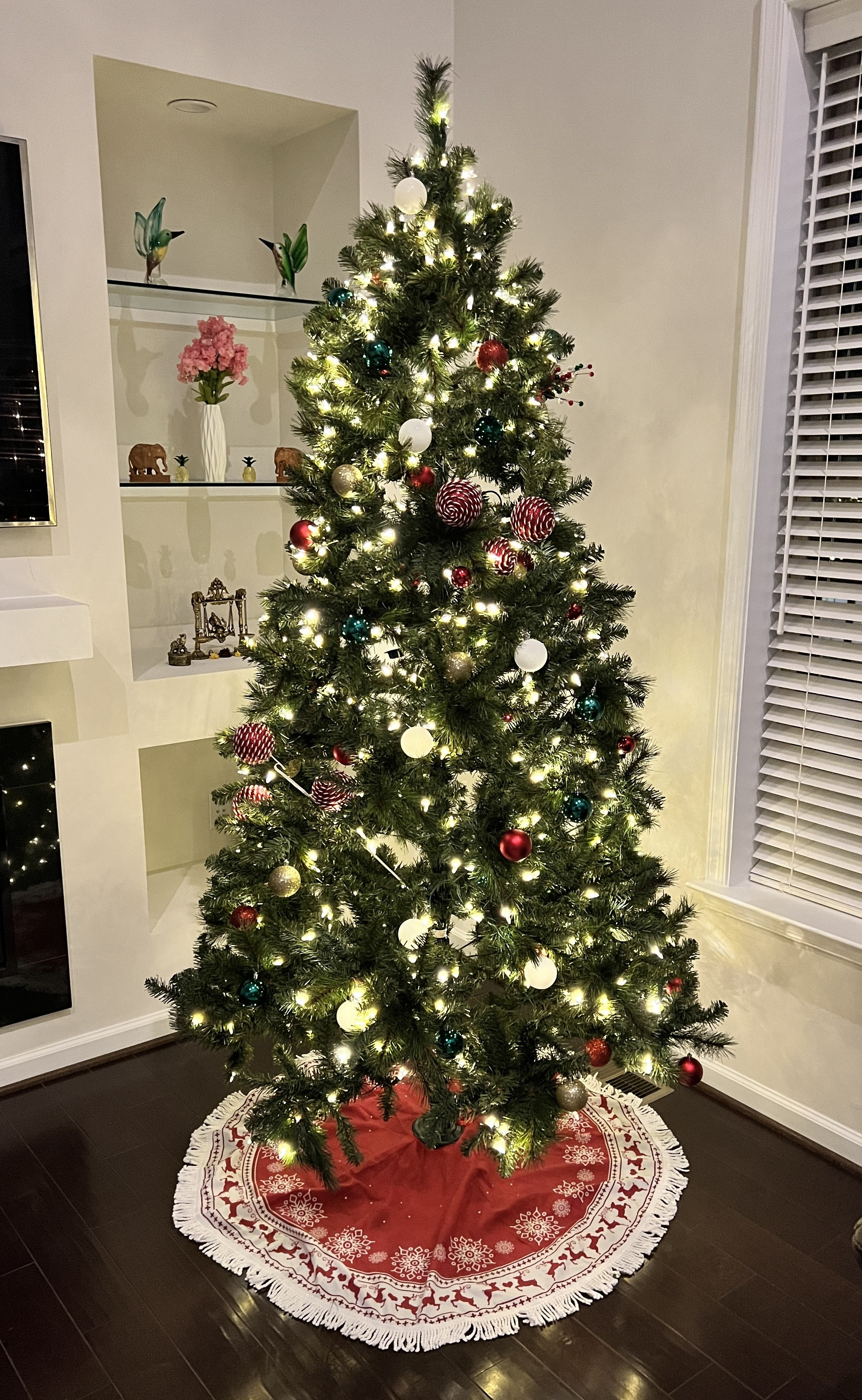
An artificial Christmas tree

The first artificial Christmas trees were developed in Germany during the 19th century, though earlier examples exist. These "trees" were made using goose feathers that were dyed green, as one response by Germans to continued deforestation. Feather Christmas trees ranged widely in size, from a small 5-centimeter (2 in) tree to a large 2.5-meter (98 in) tree sold in department stores during the 1920s. Often, the tree branches were tipped with artificial red berries which acted as candle holders.

Over the years, other styles of artificial Christmas trees have evolved and become popular. In 1930, the U.S.-based Addis Brush Company created the first artificial Christmas tree made from brush bristles. Another type of artificial tree is the aluminum Christmas tree, first manufactured in Chicago in 1958, and later in Manitowoc, Wisconsin, where the majority of the trees were produced. Most modern artificial Christmas trees are made from plastic recycled from used packaging materials, such as polyvinyl chloride (PVC). Approximately 10% of artificial Christmas trees are using virgin suspension PVC resin; despite being plastic most artificial trees are not recyclable or biodegradable.

Trends developed in the early 2000s included optical fiber Christmas trees, which come in two major varieties; one resembling a traditional Christmas tree. One Dallas-based company offers "holographic mylar" trees in many hues. Tree-shaped objects made from such materials as cardboard, glass, ceramic or other materials can be found in use as tabletop decorations. Upside-down artificial Christmas trees became popular for a short time and were originally introduced as a marketing gimmick; they allowed consumers to get closer to ornaments for sale in retail stores and opened up floor space for more products.

Artificial trees became increasingly popular during the late 20th century. Users of artificial Christmas trees assert that they are more convenient, and, because they are reusable, much cheaper than their natural alternative. They are also considered much safer, as natural trees can be a significant fire hazard. Between 2001 and 2007, artificial Christmas tree sales in the U.S. jumped from 7.3 million to 17.4 million. Currently, it is estimated that around 58% of Christmas trees used in the United States are artificial, while numbers in the United Kingdom are indicated to be around 66%.

== Environmental issues ==
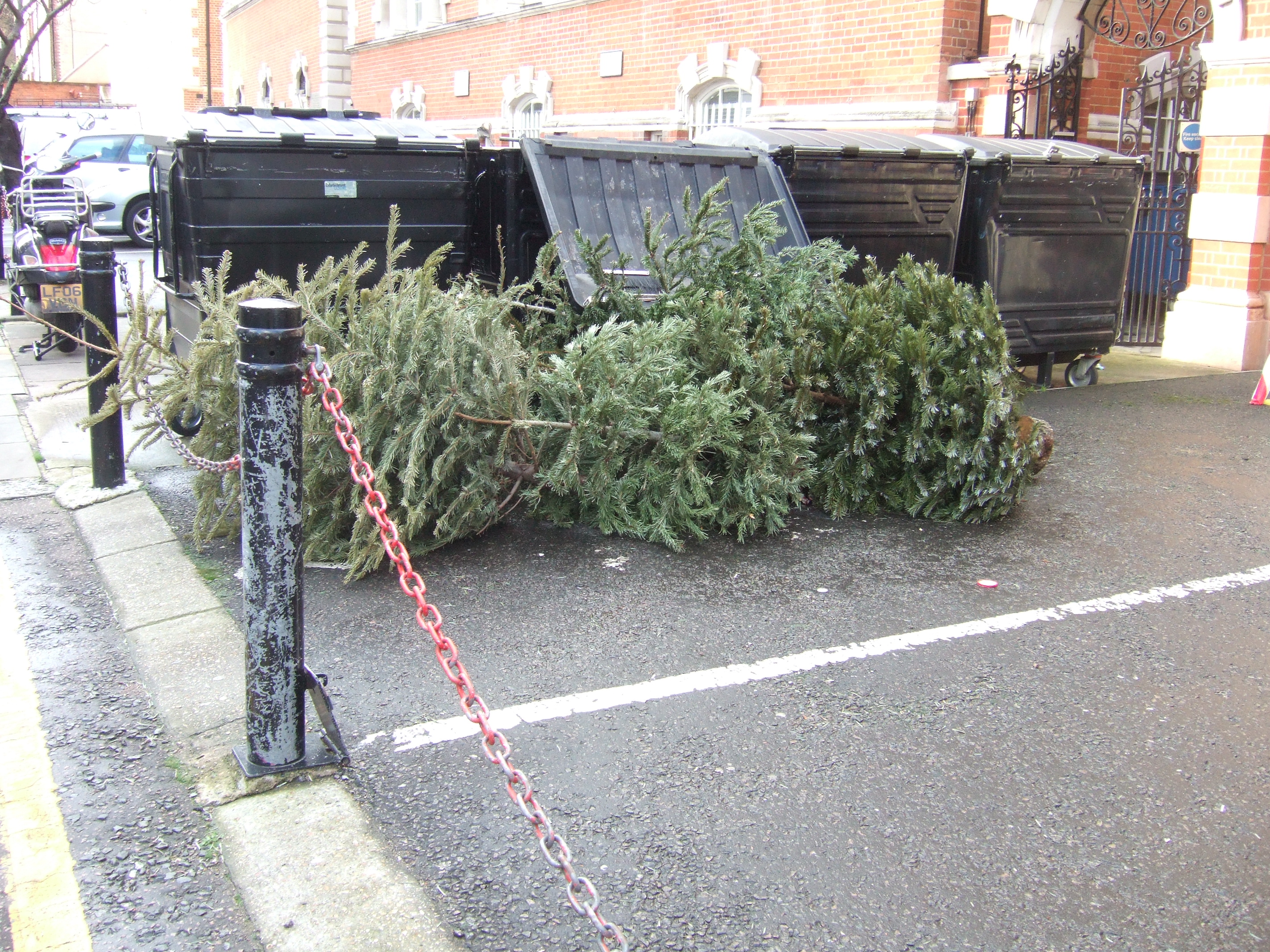
Discarded Christmas trees by dumpster

The debate about the environmental impact of artificial trees is ongoing. Generally, natural tree growers contend that artificial trees are more environmentally harmful than their natural counterparts. However, trade groups, such as the American Christmas Tree Association, claim that the PVC used in Christmas trees is chemically and mechanically stable, does not affect human health, and has excellent recyclable properties.

Live trees are typically grown as a crop and replanted in rotation after cutting, often providing suitable habitat for wildlife. Alternately, live trees can be donated to livestock farmers who find that trees uncontaminated by chemical additives are excellent fodder. In some cases, management of Christmas tree crops can result in poor habitat since it sometimes involves heavy input of pesticides.

Concerns have been raised by arborists about people cutting down old and rare conifers, such as the Keteleeria evelyniana for Christmas trees.

Real or cut trees are used only for a short time, but can be recycled and used as mulch, wildlife habitat, or used to prevent erosion. Real trees are carbon-neutral: they emit no more carbon dioxide by being cut down and disposed of than they absorb while growing. However, emissions can occur from farming activities and transportation. An independent life-cycle assessment study, conducted by a firm of experts in sustainable development, states that a natural tree will generate 3.1 kg (6.8 lb) of greenhouse gases every year (based on purchasing 5 km (3.1 mi) from home) whereas the artificial tree will produce 48.3 kg (106 lb) over its lifetime. Some people use living Christmas or potted trees for several seasons, providing a longer life cycle for each tree. Living Christmas trees can be purchased or rented from local market growers. Rentals are picked up after the holidays, while purchased trees can be planted by the owner after use or donated to local tree adoption or urban reforestation services. Smaller and younger trees may be replanted after each season, with the following year running up to the next Christmas allowing the tree to carry out further growth.

The use of lead stabilizer in Chinese imported trees has been an issue of concern. A 2004 study found that while in general artificial trees pose little health risk from lead contamination, there do exist "worst-case scenarios" where major health risks to young children exist. A 2008 United States Environmental Protection Agency report found that as the PVC in artificial Christmas trees aged it began to degrade. The report determined that of the fifty million artificial trees in the United States approximately twenty million were nine or more years old, the point where dangerous lead contamination levels are reached. A professional study on the life-cycle assessment of both real and artificial Christmas trees revealed that one must use an artificial Christmas tree at least twenty years to leave an environmental footprint as small as the natural Christmas tree.

== Religious issues ==
Pope John Paul II introduced the Christmas tree custom to the Vatican in 1982. Although at first disapproved of by some as out of place at the centre of the Roman Catholic Church, the Vatican Christmas Tree has become an integral part of the Vatican Christmas celebrations, and in 2005 Pope Benedict XVI spoke of it as part of the normal Christmas decorations in Catholic homes. In 2004, John Paul II called the Christmas tree a symbol of Christ. In the previous year he said: "Beside the crib, the Christmas tree, with its twinkling lights, reminds us that with the birth of Jesus the tree of life has blossomed anew in the desert of humanity. The crib and the tree: precious symbols, which hand down in time the true meaning of Christmas." The Catholic Church's official Book of Blessings has a service for the blessing of the Christmas tree in a home. The Episcopal Church in The Anglican Family Prayer Book has long had a ritual titled Blessing of a Christmas Tree, as well as Blessing of a Crèche, for use in the church and the home; family services and public liturgies for the blessing of Christmas trees are common in other Christian denominations as well.

Chrismon trees, which find their origin in the Lutheran Christian tradition though are now used in many Christian denominations such as the Catholic Church and Methodist Church, are used to decorate churches during the liturgical season of Advent; during the period of Christmastide, Christian churches display the traditional Christmas tree in their sanctuaries.

Some cities and institutions in the United States have renamed public “Christmas trees” as “holiday trees” or similar neutral labels in an effort to frame civic displays as inclusive of non-Christian residents. Municipal officials and legal advocates have linked the use of such terms to concerns about maintaining separation between church and state in publicly funded or government-sponsored displays. This neutral naming aims to reduce the risk that a civic tree-lighting ceremony could be interpreted as governmental endorsement of a particular religion. However, these changes have often generated organized opposition from Christian groups and some public officials, who argue that dropping the word "Christmas" diminishes the holiday's religious character and long-established cultural terminology.

== See also ==
- Badnjak
- Christmas traditions
- Christmas tree controversies
- Eiresione
- Festive ecology
- Festivus pole
- Hanging of the greens
- Hanukkah bush
- Kadomatsu
- Legend of the Christmas Spider
- Nardoqan
- New Year tree
- Tree worship
- Weihnachten
- Yule log
