= Paul Oberschneider =

- Born: 16 August 1958 (age 68); Roselle, Illinois
- Education: Loyola University
- Occupation: CEO of Hilltop Credit Partners
- Known for: CEO of Ober-Haus Real Estate and Hauser-Oberschneider
- Website: www.hilltopcreditpartners.com

Paul Oberschneider (born 16 August 1958) is an American-Estonian businessman, investor, and property developer. He is the chairman and CEO of Hilltop Credit Partners, a UK based real estate private equity firm providing finance to real estate developers. He is also known for founding real estate companies including Ober-Haus Real Estate and Hauser-Oberschneider in Central and Eastern Europe.

== Early life ==
Paul Oberschneider was born in the Midwestern town of Roselle, Illinois in 1958. He attended Culver Military Academy and graduated in 1976. He graduated from Loyola University in 1981.

== Business career ==
Oberschneider worked on the Chicago Board of Trade (CBOT) starting in 1979 and later as a trader for Steve Fosset in New York, as a futures and equity options trader. Oberschneider then joined the investment team for Shearson Lehman Brothers on Wall Street in 1986. In 1993, Oberschneider moved to Tallinn, Estonia, where he began to build a real estate business throughout central and Eastern Europe. He founded Ober-Haus Real Estate and Hauser-Oberschneider in 1994, acting as Chairman for both companies. Ober-Haus Real Estate Company grew to become one of Central Europe's largest real estate companies. The company operated 33 offices across Poland, Lithuania, Ukraine, Latvia, and Estonia. In 2004, Finland's Realia Group announced that it would purchase the Ober-Haus real estate company. They bought the company in 2007.

In 1999, Oberschneider founded Schlossle Hotel Group. The company built a portfolio of four luxury 5-star boutique hotels and restaurants in Tallinn, Riga, and Kraków, before being sold to a Spanish hotel operator in 2006.

Paul Oberschneider acted as Chairman for Hauser-Oberschneider until 2010, working with international property and private equity firms like Apollo, Grainger PLC, Immo East, and Citigroup Property Advisors. The company pioneered the construction and financing of "western" styled residential apartments, retail hypermarkets and hotel properties across Central and Eastern Europe.

In 2010, he invested in, and took the role as Chairman of London-based healthy fast food retailer, Vital Ingredient. He sold his stake in the business in 2016, as part of a management buyout deal involving private equity firm, LDC. In 2012, Paul Oberschneider purchased The Manor Hotel in Oxfordshire, taking the asset out of administration from a UK bank.

In 2017, Oberschneider re-launched Hauser-Oberschneider as a real estate investment company that is an alternative debt provider and private client real estate advisor in the UK and European real estate sector. It is regulated by the Financial Conduct Authority.

In 2018, Oberschneider formed Hilltop Credit Partners, a joint venture with Round Hill Capital to provide financing to real estate developers in England and Europe.

== Personal life ==
Paul Oberschneider played with his La Golondrina polo team that played in the Queens Cup and Gold Cup in the UK, as well as corresponding tournaments in Argentina. In 2018 he was awarded the Estonian medal for his contributions to Estonia, and for starting the world-famous Tallinn Christmas Market. He is the author of the book, "Why Sell Tacos in Africa?" (2016) and the "Fast Track Entrepreneur: Success leaves footprints" (2017).
