= Michael Bickford =

American businessman

- Born: Greenwich, Connecticut
- Education: Vanderbilt University
- Occupation: Businessman

Michael Bickford is an American businessman. He is the founder of Round Hill Capital, a real estate investment firm.

== Early life ==
Michael Bickford was born in Greenwich, Connecticut.

He graduated from Vanderbilt University in Nashville, Tennessee.

== Career ==
Bickford has over 18 years of experience in private equity real estate. From 1995 to 2002, he worked as an acquisition professional for the Morgan Stanley Real Estate Funds.

In 2002, he founded Round Hill Capital, a real estate investment firm which has invested approximately $6 billion of capital in European real estate since its inception. His company attracted attention in Ireland for a proposed deal to buy homes there, a deal that was later withdrawn following criticism.

== Personal life ==
Bickford plays high goal polo competitively in England, Spain, France and the United States. He started playing at a young age with his father in Vermont, and today plays against the top players in the world by competing in the Queens Cup, British Open, Gold Cup in Spain, and the high goal tournaments in Wellington, Florida. La Indiana is the team name and is considered one of the most competitive teams in the world today. Bickford won the Amateur Most Valuable Player award in 2021. He resides in Palm Beach, Florida where he is founder of private members club Carriage House.

== Round Hill Capital reorganisation ==
In November 2022, Round Hill Capital confirmed that it was putting RHC Europe LLP, the legal entity employing most of its UK-based staff, into liquidation as part of an operational reorganisation. The company said its Irish platform and its wider European operations were unaffected and that it was "business as usual", and described its assets as worth about $6 billion. Trade press reported that 34 of the company's 64 UK roles were under review,and that a Round Hill-created ESG-focused developer, Modomo, had been put into liquidation earlier that year. Round Hill said it had staffed up for growth and now faced a market with slower activity, and stated that its Nido student-housing business and its proptech investment arm were not part of the review. The same report noted that Round Hill had bought Nido from Blackstone for £415 million in 2012 and sold it to Greystar for £600 million in 2015.

== Carriage House ==
Bickford and his wife Paula founded Carriage House, an English-style private members' club in Palm Beach, Florida, with Paula Bickford serving as its creative director. he proposal, which Bickford described as similar to exclusive London clubs such as Annabel's and 5 Hertford Street, was delayed by the Palm Beach Town Council over concerns about parking, noise, hours and membership capacity. The club opened in March 2022, and in 2024 the council voted unanimously to let it add 75 members, bringing its membership from 232 to 307 for the 2024–25 season, and to move 40 of its approved indoor dining seats to a courtyard. The club said 86% of its members were residents of the town.
