= Vital ingredient =

British company

Vital Ingredient
- Company type: Private
- Industry: Retail outlets
- Founded: 2001
- Headquarters: 7 Carlisle St, London W1D 3BW
- Key people: Alex Heynes (founding director); Kate Collis (CFO); Graham Turner (chairman); Paolo Peretti (managing director)
- Products: Salads, soups, juices, smoothies and breakfast
- Website: http://vitalingredient.co.uk

Vital Ingredient was a UK brand which operated a chain of made-to-order salad and soup bars in London, mainly in the City and around Soho.

Vital Ingredient primarily marketed its own range of salads and soups made on site. Juices, smoothies and hot breakfasts were also on the menu. Each store used an American style counter service format to assemble meal orders from individual ingredients within view of the customers.

The company was founded by Alex Heynes, with the first store opening in Soho in 2001. It expanded to five stores by 2008.

In 2011, Vital Ingredient secured £2.75 million in funding from Santander Corporate & Commercial's Breakthrough programme. The company's annual turnover doubled to £12 million by 2013.

From 2011 to 2015, the company tripled its number of outlets after it took on some equity investment from the property entrepreneur Paul Oberschneider and, in 2015, it opened its 17th outlet on Artillery Row in Victoria. In early 2015, Paolo Peretti was appointed managing director.

In April 2016, the chain underwent a £12m management buyout led by Heynes & Peretti, which was backed by the private equity house LDC.

The chain also secured £4 million in growth capital from Santander as it aimed to grow to over 40 stores.

In January 2018, Vital Ingredient went through a pre-pack administration and was acquired by FCFM Group. 13 stores were acquired andseven were closed permanently as a result.

In March 2018, Tossed announced that it had bought the Vital Ingredient chain from FCFM Group.

In July 2020, during the first COVID-19 lockdown for in central London, Zest Food, the company trading as both Tossed and Vital Ingredient, filed a notice of intention to appoint administrators.

The Vital Ingredient brand has not been traded since the COVID19 pandemic.
