= Tallinn Christmas Market =

Annual Christmas market in Tallinn

Coordinates: 59.4373°N 24.7457°E

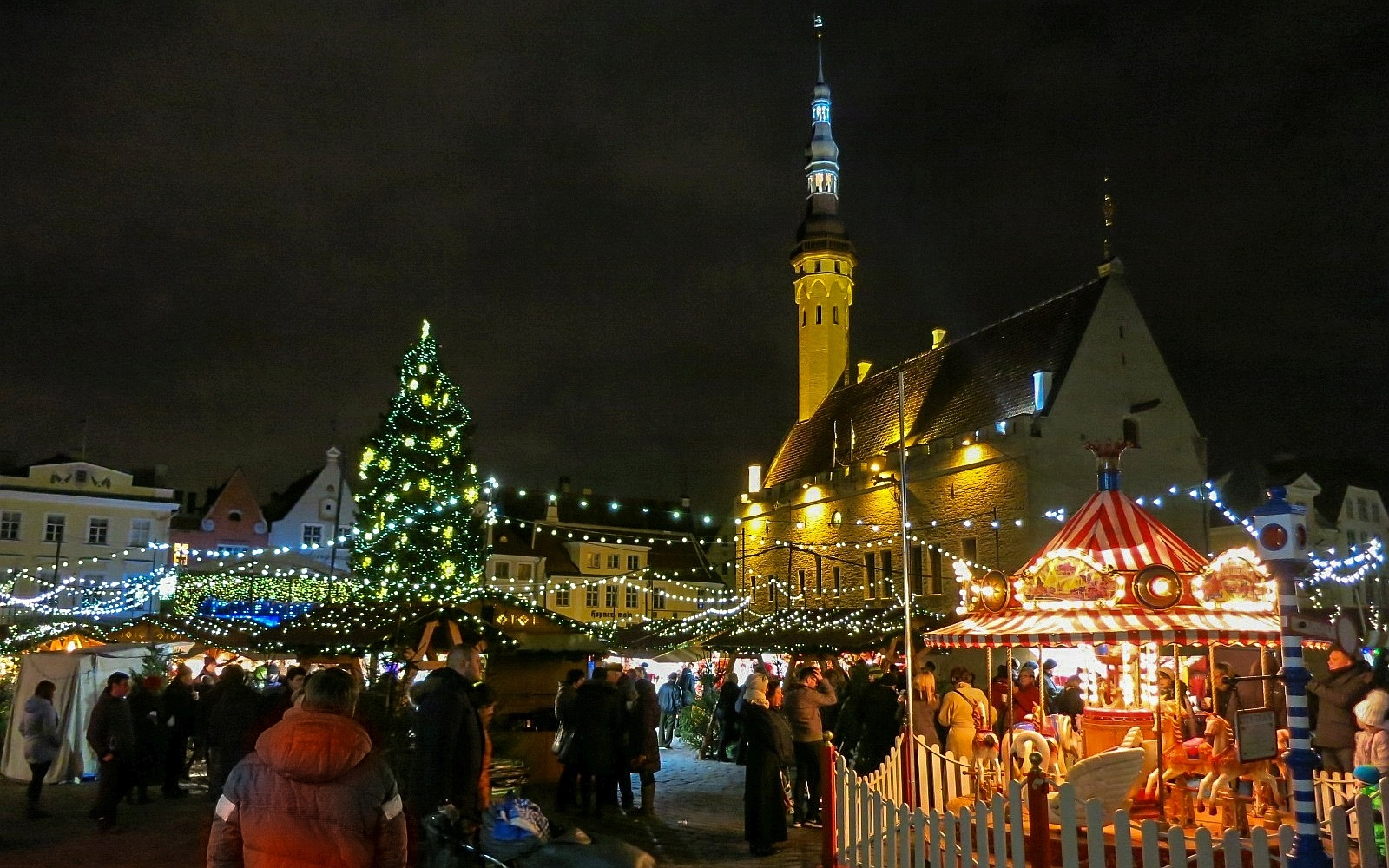
Tallinn Christmas Market in 2015

Tallinn Christmas Market (Estonian: Tallinna Jõuluturg) is a Christmas market held every year in Tallinn, Estonia. The modern market was founded in 2001 by Paul Oberschneider, and is open from Christmas Day until Epiphany. The latter also marks the end of the Christmas season according to the Gregorian calendar. The market brings tourists from all over the world to Tallinn.

This is traditionally held on the old Town Hall Square. Christmas cabins and stands sell handcrafts, hot wine and souvenirs to about 200,000 visitors every year.

In 2024 Estonian Public Broadcasting described the market as "tacky" with kitschy elements resembling a souvenir shop.

== Historical Relevance ==
Tallinn is the oldest capital city in Northern Europe and has one of the best preserved medieval town centres in the world. The first Christmas tree at Tallinn’s Town Hall Square was erected in 1441 by the Brotherhood of Blackheads; this was the first public Christmas Tree ever put on display in Europe.

The Brotherhood of the Blackheads, as a guild for unmarried merchants, first erected the tree for the holiday period in their brotherhood house. On the last night of celebrations the tree was taken to the Town Hall square where the members of the brotherhood danced around it before setting it on fire.

== See also ==
- List of Christmas markets
