= Chichilaki =

Georgian traditional Christmas tree

The chichilaki (Georgian: ჩიჩილაკი) is a Georgian traditional Christmas tree made from dried hazelnut or walnut branches that are shaved to form a small "tree". These pale-colored ornaments differ in height from 20 cm (8 in) to 3 meters (10 feet). Chichilakis are most common in the Guria and Samegrelo regions near the Black Sea, but they can also be found in some stores around the capital of Tbilisi.

Chichilaki is currently proposed by the President of Georgia to be inscribed on the UNESCO Representative List of the Intangible Cultural Heritage of Humanity.

== Georgian tradition ==
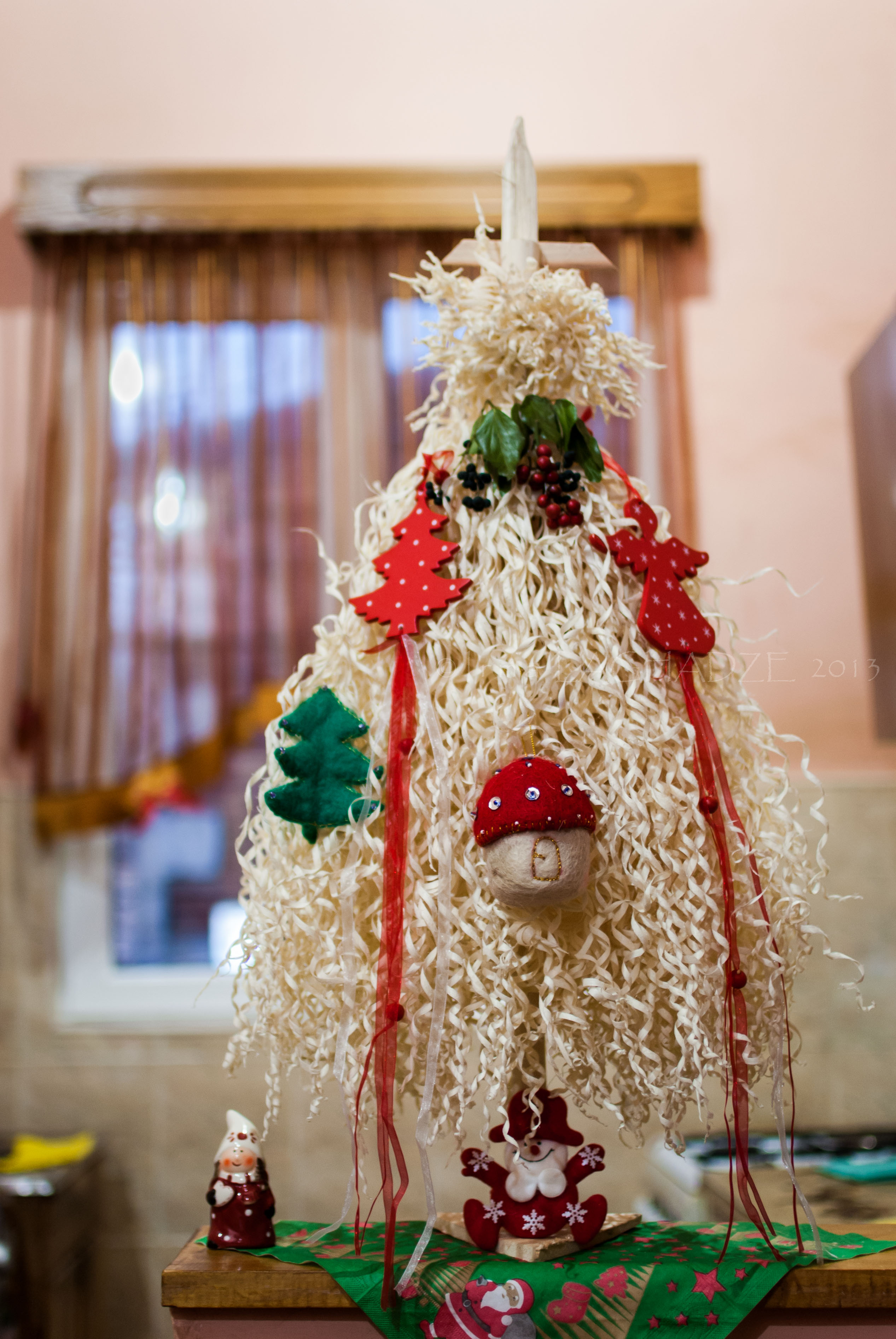
Chichilaki with ornaments

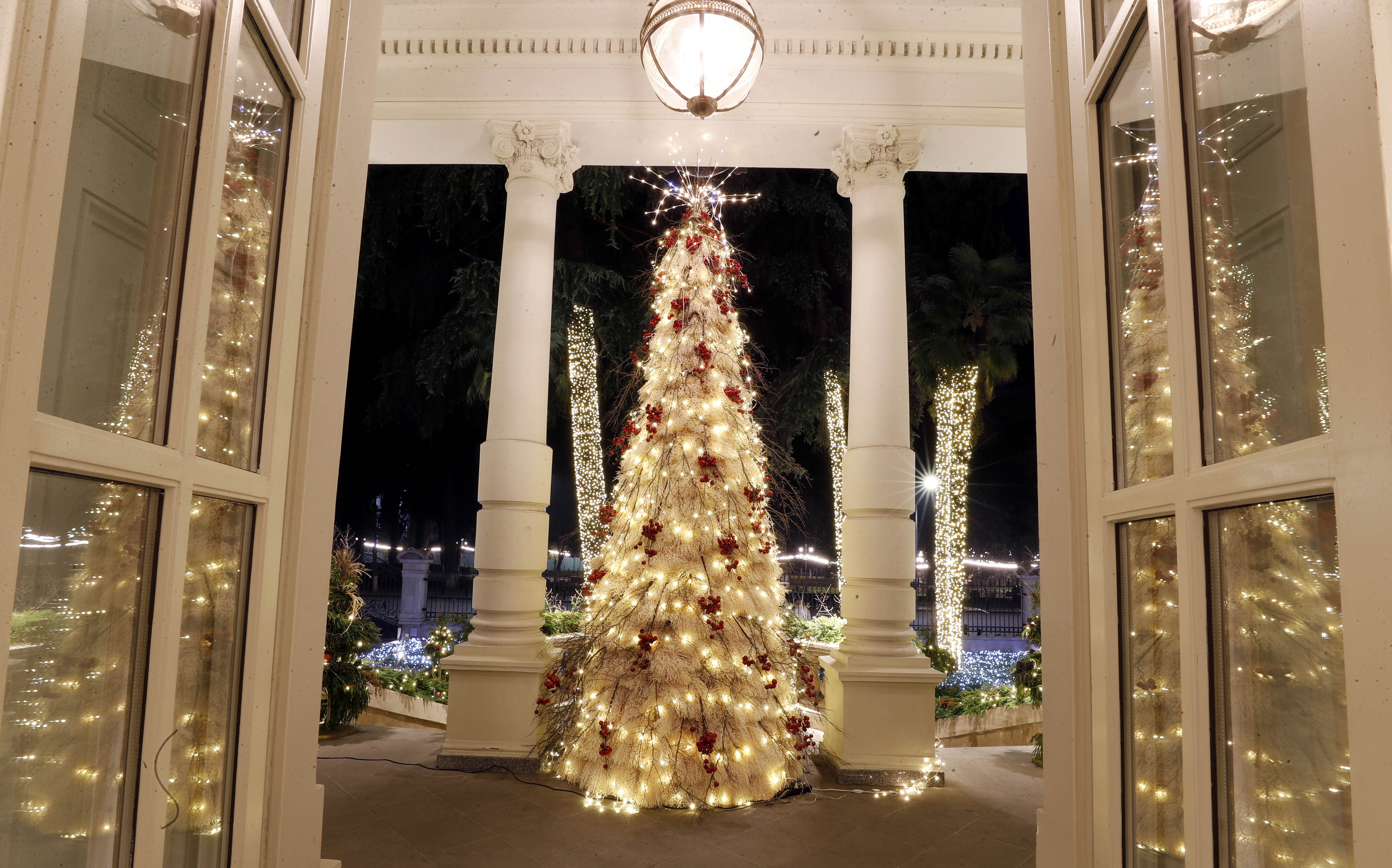
Presidential Chichilaki at the Orbeliani Palace

The traditional making of chichilakis is an important part of the Georgian Orthodox Christmas, which is observed on 7 January. The Georgians believe that the shaved tree resembles the famous beard of St. Basil the Great, who is thought to visit people during Christmas similar to the Santa Claus tradition. It is also believed that the chichilakis represent the tree of life, a symbol of hope for the Georgians.

Every year, people flock to stalls to buy chichilakis and decorate them with small fruits and berries. Apples, pomegranates, and madder are attached to the tree as offerings to heaven for a bountiful harvest.

The chichilakis are then ceremoniously burned on the day before the Georgian Orthodox Epiphany on 19 January to symbolize the passing of the previous year's troubles. Some families in Samegrelo purchase chichilakis for relatives who have recently died.

== Soviet ban ==
During the Soviet occupation of Georgia in 1921, the sale of chichilakis was banned because the Soviets viewed it as a religious symbol. While they allowed the Georgians to keep some aspects of their culture, they condemned any semblance of religious customs. This decree stayed in effect until the fall of Soviet rule in Georgia in 1990. Since then, the popularity of chichilakis has risen.

== Environmental concerns ==
The use of the chichilaki as a Christmas decoration is generally believed by the Georgians to be more environment-friendly than the cutting of pine trees. Since they are made from pruned branches, it is considered beneficial to the health of the trees.

The Georgian government has taken steps to support the preservation of the environment by placing a costly fine on anyone found harvesting and transporting pine trees outside of the registered farms. The fine is set at about US$1,200 (£765), three times the average monthly salary. They have also improved their forest ranger patrols around the country.

== See also ==
- Inau
