= Round Hill Capital =

Real estate investment company

- Founded: Delaware, United States
- Founder: Michael Bickford
- Headquarters: London, UK
- Number of locations: 14 offices worldwide
- Area served: Worldwide
- Services: Real Estate Investment and Management
- AUM: $6.8 billion
- Number of employees: More than 230 employees globally
- Website: www.roundhillcapital.com

Round Hill Capital LLC (RHC) is a fully integrated real estate investment and management company founded in Delaware, United States of America.

The company has 14 offices globally in the UK, Germany, the Netherlands, Luxembourg, Spain, Sweden, Ireland, Singapore and the United States. The firm's business model is alleged to be adding to Ireland's housing crisis.

== History ==
It was founded in 2002 by Michael Bickford, a former Morgan Stanley Real Estate Funds professional.

In 2007, Round Hill Capital acquired the Vitus Group, a German residential real estate operator with over 30,000 apartments in seven countries. Vitus was acquired for 1.3 billion euros ($1.8 billion U.S.).

In 2012, Round Hill Capital acquired the Nido Student Living portfolio from The Blackstone Group. The portfolio comprises 2,500 student beds in three towers in Central London, including the world's tallest student accommodation building at Prodigy Living Spitalfields.

According to Reuters, as of October 2013, Vitus's enterprise value was 1.2-1.4 billion euros ($1.6-1.9 billion USD). At that time, the company had 30,000 apartments. Reuters stated that month that according to four individuals, Round Hill was considering how to sell Vitus. In December 2013, according to Reuters, its sources stated that Round Hill and its fellow co-owners of Vitus Immobilien were in negotiations with Deutsche Annington on selling Vitus to the latter.

Round Hill Capital has also acquired office buildings across Europe, including eight buildings totalling 2.5 million sq ft in Germany, Belgium, Netherlands and Austria.
