= Carl Wenzel Zajicek =

Austrian painter (1860–1923)

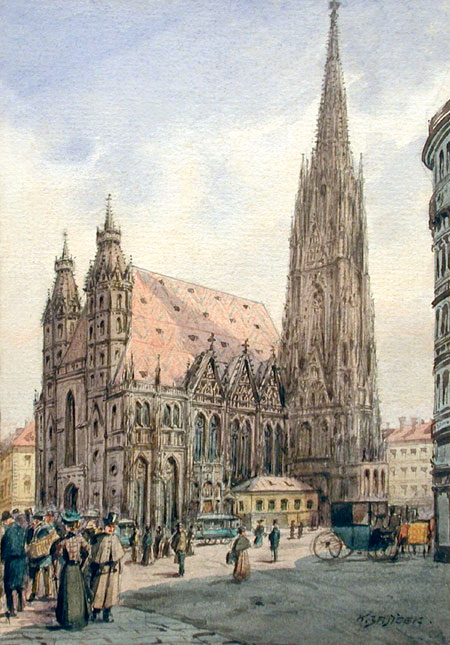
Stephansdom

Carl Wenzel Zajicek (29 February 1860 – 19 March 1923) was a Viennese painter.

He was born as one of 24 children of watchmaker Franz Zajicek. Educated in his father's craft, he worked as a watchmaker until 1900, but he practiced artistic painting as an amateur from a young age. Inspired by Emil Hütter, he specialized on Vedute of the city of Vienna, and he rose to notability in 1896 with a large panoramic painting.

== Literature ==
- Carl Wenzel Zajicek: „Spaziergang durch das historische Wien“. Galerie Szaal, Wien.
