= Attack of the Mutant Artificial Trees =

Online video game

- Developer: Blockdot
- Publisher: Kewlbox
- Platform: Browser
- Release: WW: November, 2004
- Genre: Action,

Attack of the Mutant Artificial Trees is a free online video game developed as part of a marketing campaign by the National Christmas Tree Association in 2004. The game was meant to support the natural Christmas tree industry and received criticism from artificial tree producers. It has been described as similar to Whac-A-Mole.

== Game ==
Players are called upon to pelt mutant artificial Christmas trees with snowballs, while avoiding the elves interspersed between the garishly colored mutant trees. Mutant trees emerge from boxes that are marked "100% Fake" or "Made in China". The trees, as the game says, have "mutated and are sucking the spirit out of Christmas". The game features an "Xmas Spirit Meter" light which dims for every mutant tree missed or elf hit by mistake. Between rounds the game provides "facts" about Christmas trees, or, depending on your point of view, "didactic little warnings about the evils of fake trees".

== Development ==
The game was developed by a Dallas-based Internet marketing firm, Kewlbox; Kewlbox is a launching platform for games created by Blockdot. The National Christmas Tree Association, a trade group representing the Christmas tree farming industry, commissioned Attack to press their message that natural trees are the way to celebrate Christmas. The game was released for free download or online play in November 2004.

== Reception ==
Salon writer Andrew Leonard said of Attack of the Mutant Artificial Christmas Trees, "(the game is) diverting for about three nanoseconds — less, if you give in to the urge to pelt the annoying elf, for which you are unfairly punished". Despite Leonard's assessment, the game was played by 75,000 people in the first week of its release. While the game was meant as light hearted, some artificial tree producers were not amused. The CEO of Balsam Hill Company, a U.S. artificial tree manufacturer, said he was surprised at the negativity of the tree growers' ad campaign, adding that it was not exactly "warm and fuzzy".
