= Christmas tree stand =

Object designed to support a Christmas tree

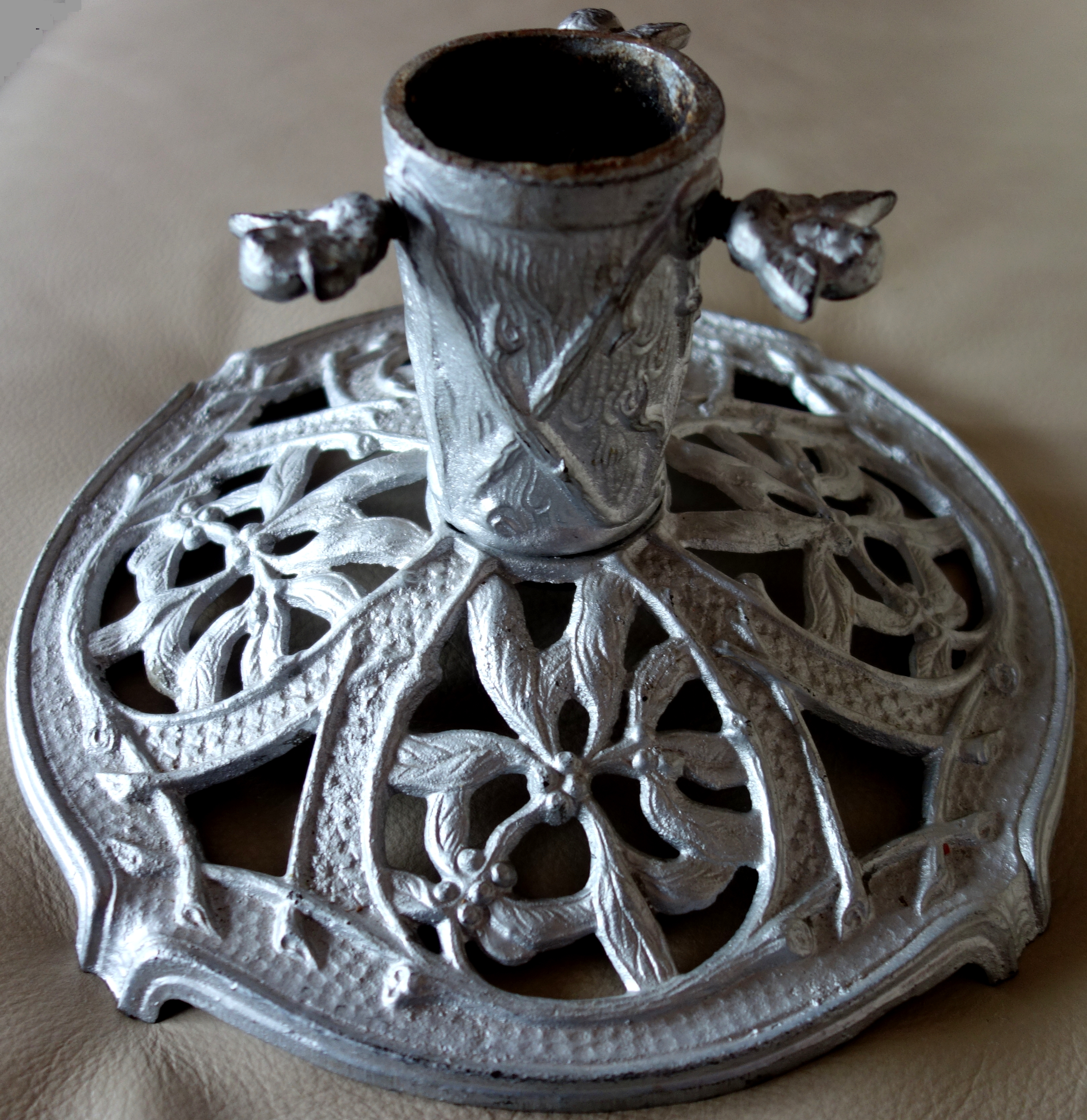
Art Nouveau Christmas tree stand with floral decorations (around 1900)

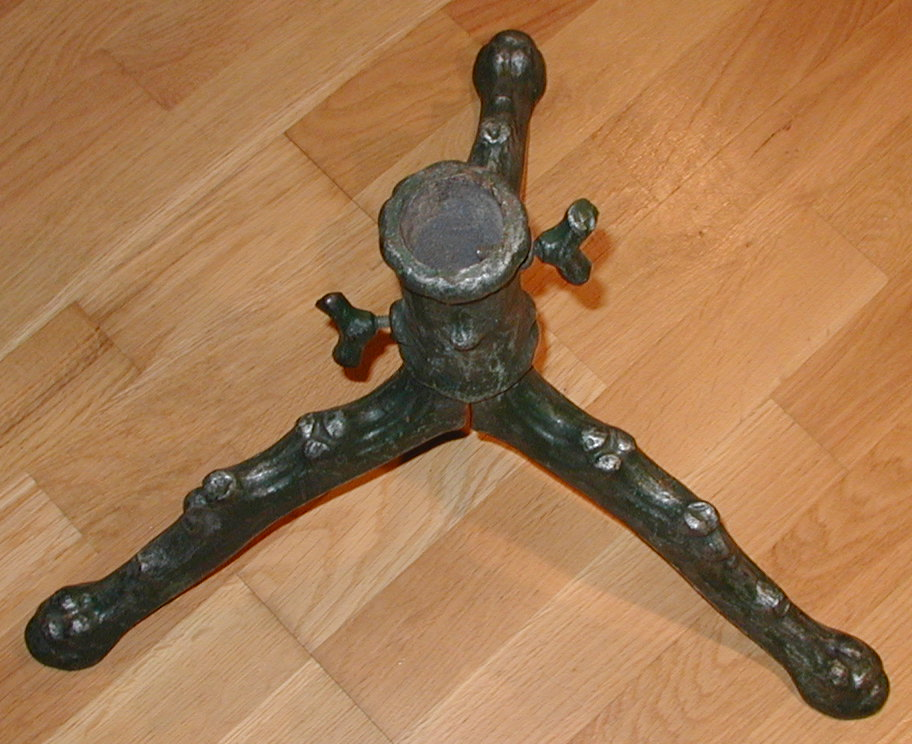
An Austrian Christmas tree stand, just one of the various existing styles

A Christmas tree stand is an object designed to support a cut, natural or an artificial Christmas tree. Christmas tree stands appeared as early as 1876 and have had various designs over the years. Those stands designed for natural trees have a water-well, which, in many cases may not hold enough water to adequately supply the cut tree.

Some specialty Christmas tree stands have value on the secondary antiques market.

== History ==
Christmas tree stands have been around at least since 1876, when Arthur's Illustrated Home Magazine suggested connecting a Christmas tree stand into a stand for flowers. In that same year, Hermann Albrecht of Philadelphia, Pennsylvania received U.S. patent 183,100 and U.S. patent 183,194as two of the first Christmas tree stand patents issued in the United States. In 1892, carpenter Edward Smith suggested a homemade Christmas tree stand, noting,

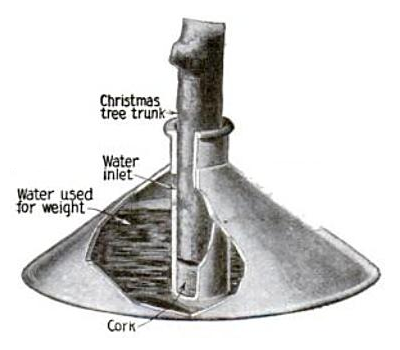
1919 bottle-shaped Christmas-tree stand configured to be weighted by water or sand to support the tree.

As Christmas is near at hand, I will tell how I made a pretty stand for a Christmas tree: I took a board 14x14 inches, and one inch thick around this I made a tiny paling fence — there is a post at each corner set firmly Into a 1/4-inch hole, and a gate at the middle of one side with little posts, the same as at the corner. The palings are about 1/8-inch thick, and 1/2 inch wide, and the cross pieces are just a little thicker. The best tacks I could find for tacking the palings to the cross-pieces were pins cut in two, using only the head ends. I then painted the fence white, and the board grass-green. In the center of this Is a hole into which to fasten the tree.

In 1919, an American monthly magazine Popular Science touted a new type of Christmas-tree stand. The stand featured a broad, cone-shaped base that included an inlet for water and the Christmas tree trunk. Water placed in the galvanized iron shell would give considerable weight to the stand to steady the tree. Once the tree trunk was inserted into the water inlet, the tree would be kept fresh and green much longer than without the water supply.

== Design ==
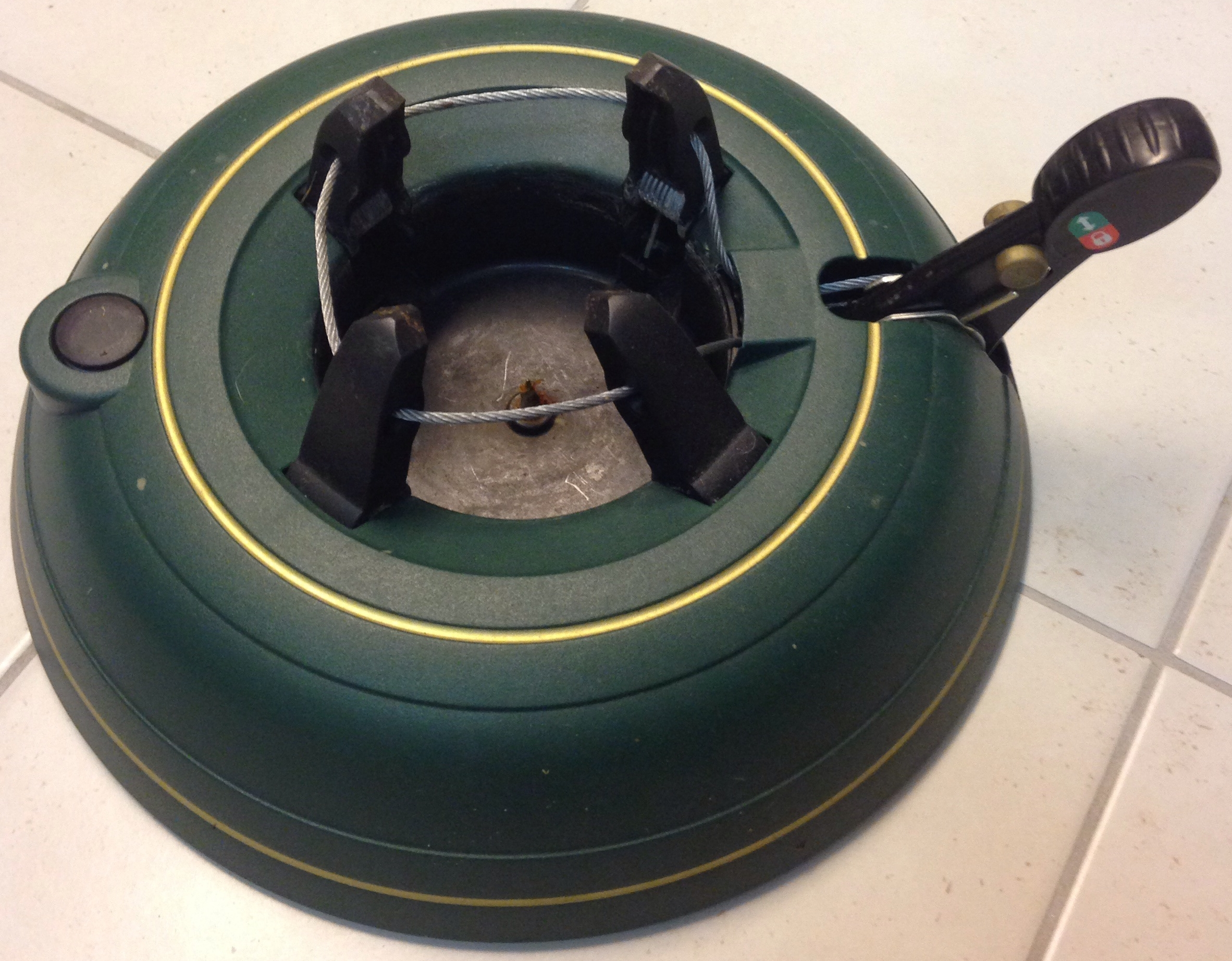
Christmas tree stand with water-well

Christmas tree stands designed for natural Christmas trees often have a water-well in them; natural trees require water so that they do not dry out. In fact, growers state that the secret to long-lived natural Christmas tree is a lot of water, so often they recommend a tree stand that has a large water reservoir. Washington State University plant pathologist Gary Chastagner conducted research into various models of Christmas tree stands and found that just six of 22 different stands tested had adequate water capacity for Christmas trees larger than 4 inches (10 cm) in diameter.

Not all Christmas tree stands are manufactured for the specific purpose, one example would be a makeshift Christmas tree stand made from an old two-gallon (~7.5 l) bucket or can. Another example of a homemade-type Christmas tree stand is a converted cast iron garden urn.

== Types of tree stands ==
Christmas tree stands sometimes had a more specialized role when it came to aluminum Christmas trees. The common method of illumination for these artificial Christmas trees was a floor-based "color wheel" which was placed under the tree. The color wheel featured varyingly colored segments on a clear plastic wheel, when switched on the wheel rotated and a light shone through the clear plastic casting an array of colors throughout the tree's metallic branches. Sometimes this spectacle was enhanced by a rotating Christmas tree stand.

== Secondary value ==
Some Christmas tree stands were uniquely designed and have value in the secondary antiques market. One example is a 1950s decorative Christmas tree stand designed by National Outfit Manufacturers Association and made of lithographed tin and featuring a holiday design. A Christmas tree stand such of the lithographed tin design could fetch up to $250 on the open market.
