= Lisbon Christmas tree =

Public Christmas tree in Lisbon, Portugal

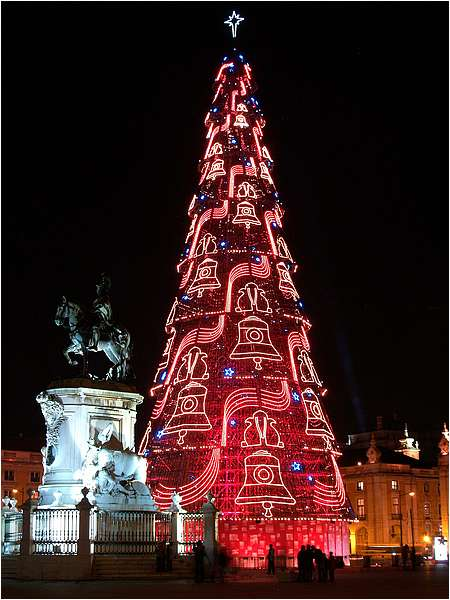
Lisbon Christmas tree, 2006

The Lisbon Christmas tree is an artificial Christmas tree erected annually in Lisbon, Portugal since 2004.

Since 2005, when it was an entrant in the Guinness World Records, the tree has been called Europe's tallest Christmas tree. The height of the tree varies every year and it was the highest in 2007 at 76 metres (249 ft).

The tree was first erected in Lisbon's Comercio Square in 2004. In 2007, it left the Portuguese capital for Porto, the country’s second largest city. In 2008, it returned to Lisbon, this time to Edward VII Park.

In 2007, the Lisbon Christmas tree and the Christmas tree in Bucharest, Romania, both at 76 metres high, competed for the title of the tallest Christmas tree in Europe. The Lisbon Christmas Tree kept its title as no Christmas tree was erected in Bucharest in 2009.
