= Aluminum Christmas tree =

Type of artificial Christmas tree

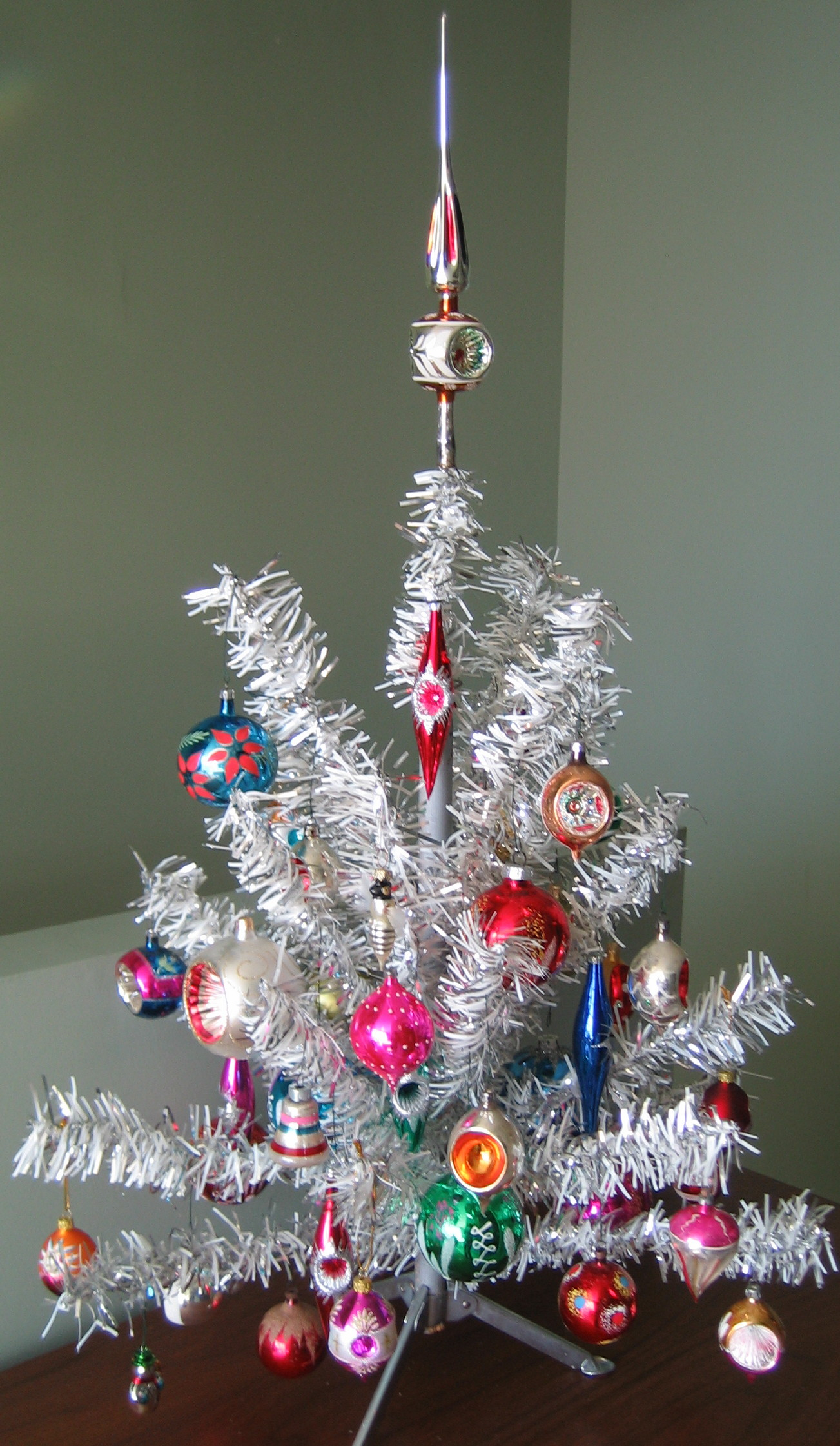
A vintage aluminum Christmas tree

An aluminum Christmas tree is a type of artificial Christmas tree that was popular in the United States from 1958 until about the mid-1960s. As its name suggests, the tree is made of aluminum, featuring foil needles and illumination from below via a rotating color wheel.

The aluminum Christmas tree was used as a symbol of the commercialization of Christmas in the 1965 television special, A Charlie Brown Christmas, which discredited its suitability as a holiday decoration. By the mid-2000s aluminum trees found a secondary market online, often selling for high premiums. The trees have also appeared in museum collections.

== History ==
=== Manufacturing ===
Aluminum trees have been said to be the first artificial Christmas trees that were not green in color. It is more accurate to say that aluminum Christmas trees were the first nongreen Christmas trees commercially successful on a grand scale. Long before aluminum Christmas trees were commercially available at least by the late 19th century, white "Christmas trees" were made at home by wrapping strips of cotton batting around leafless branches, making what appeared to be snow-laden trees that stayed white in the home. These non-green trees made perfect displays for ornaments and dropped no needles. After Christmas, the cotton was unwrapped and stored with the ornaments for the next year while the branches were burnt or otherwise discarded. Flocked trees, real or artificial, to which flocking was applied became fashionable for the wealthy during the 1930s and have been commercially available since. A 1937 issue of Popular Science advocated spraying aluminum paint using an insect spray gun to coat Christmas trees causing it to appear as if "fashioned of molten silver".

Aluminum Christmas trees were first commercially manufactured sometime around 1955, remained popular into the 1960s, and were manufactured into the 1970s. The trees were first manufactured by Modern Coatings, Inc. of Chicago. Between 1959 and 1969, the bulk of aluminum Christmas trees were produced in Manitowoc, Wisconsin, by the Aluminum Specialty Company; in that decade the company produced more than one million aluminum trees. At the time they were produced in Manitowoc the trees, including the company's flagship product the "Evergleam", retailed for $25 and wholesaled for $11.25.

=== Popularity ===
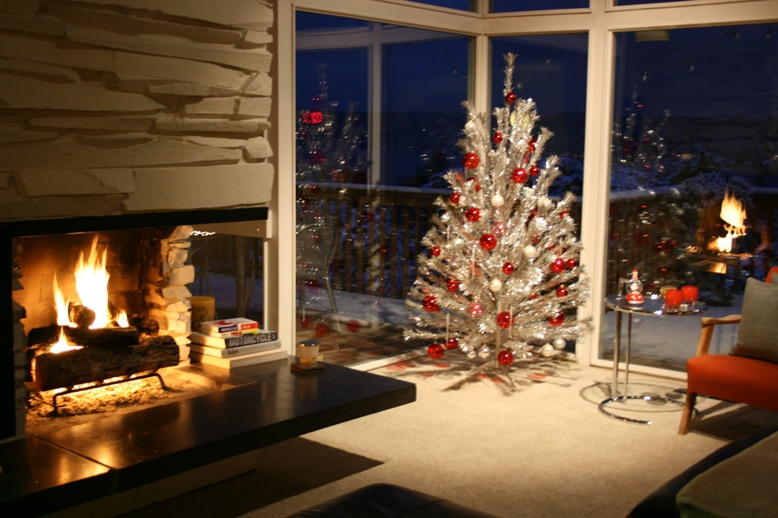
An aluminum Christmas tree on display

During the 1960s, the aluminum Christmas tree enjoyed its most popular period of usage. As the mid-1960s passed, the aluminum Christmas tree began to fall out of favor, with many thrown away or relegated to basements and attics. The airing of A Charlie Brown Christmas in 1965 has been credited with ending the era of the aluminum tree, and by 1967 their time had almost completely passed.

At the height of the aluminum tree's popularity, the trees were sold in the Sears catalog.

Whether you decorate with blue or red balls . . . or use the tree without ornaments - this exquisite tree is sure to be the talk of your neighborhood. High luster aluminum gives a dazzling brilliance. Shimmering silvery branches are swirled and tapered to a handsome realistic fullness. It's really durable . . needles are glued and mechanically locked on. Fireproof . . you can use it year after year.

— Sears, 1963 Christmas Book

=== Re-emergence ===
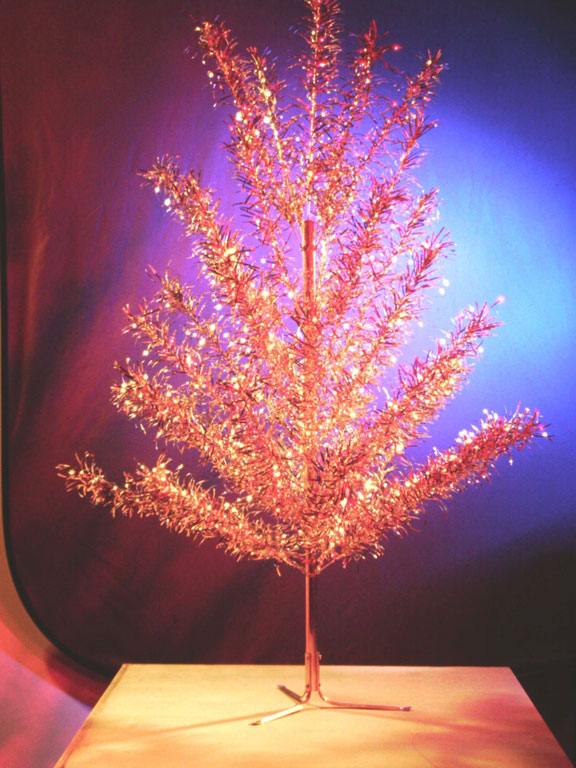
1960s tree in the collection of The Children's Museum of Indianapolis

By 1989, it was not uncommon to find aluminum Christmas trees for sale in yard sales or at estate sales being sold for as little as 25 cents. In recent years the aluminum Christmas tree has seen a re-emergence in popularity. Collectors began buying and selling the trees, especially on online auction web sites. A rare 7-foot-tall (2.1 m) pink aluminum Christmas tree sold on the Internet for $3,600 in 2005.

== Design ==
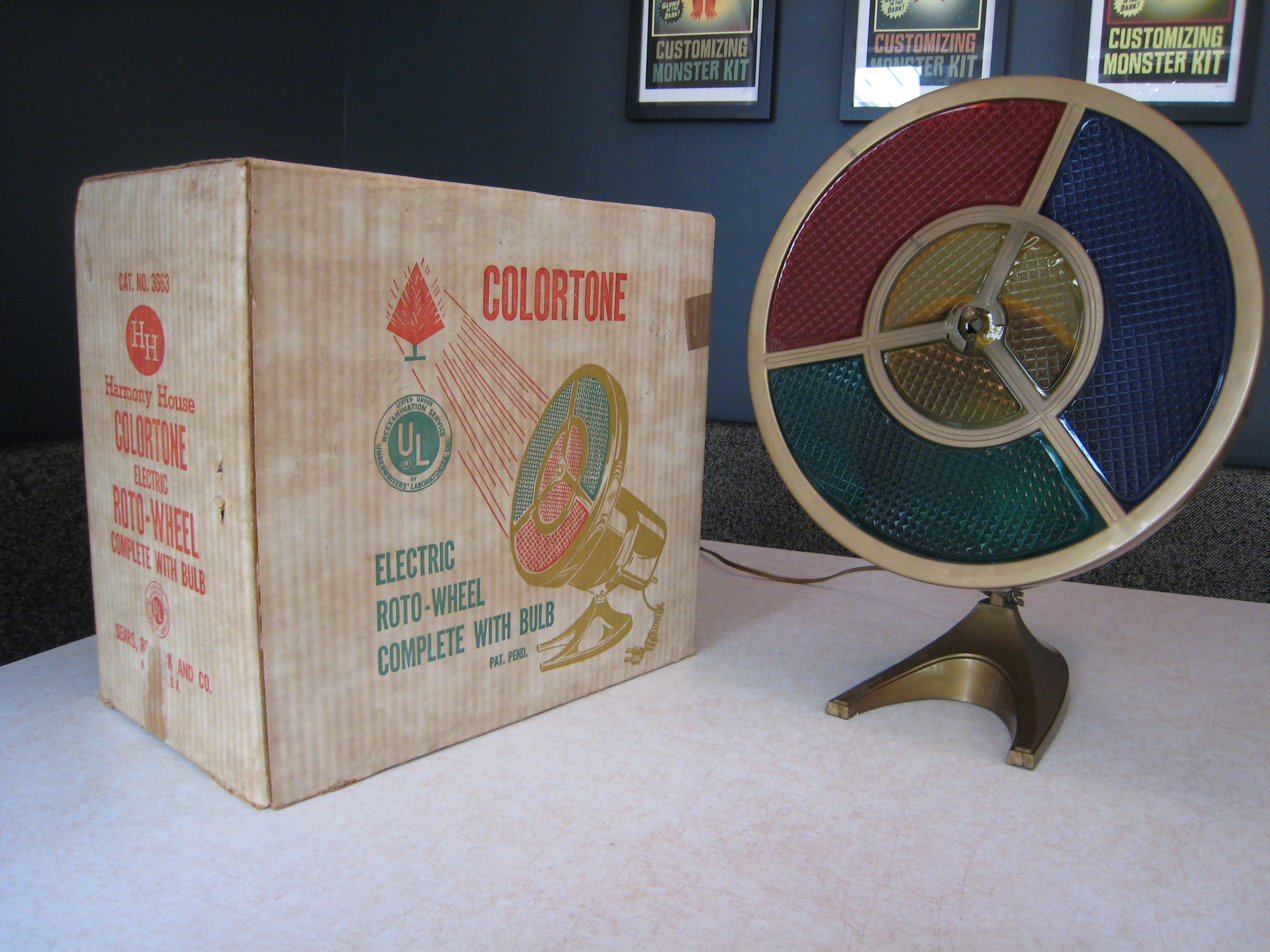
Many aluminum trees utilized a rotating color wheel which projected colored light up through the tree from the floor.

Aluminum Christmas trees consisted of aluminum branches attached to a wooden or aluminum central pole. The central pole had holes drilled into at angles so when the aluminum foil branches were attached they formed a tree shape. The foil branches had woven aluminum "needles" as well. Each tree took about 15 minutes to assemble.

The first aluminum trees could not be illuminated in the manner traditional for natural Christmas trees or other artificial trees. Fire safety concerns prevented lights from being strung through the tree's branches; draping electric lights through an aluminum tree could cause a short circuit. The common method of illumination was a floor-based "color wheel" which was placed under the tree. The color wheel featured various colored segments on a clear plastic wheel; when the wheel rotated a light shone through the clear plastic casting an array of colors throughout the tree's metallic branches. Sometimes this spectacle was enhanced by a rotating Christmas tree stand.

Aluminum Christmas trees have been variously described as futuristic or as cast in a style which evoked the glitter of the Space Age. A Money magazine article published on the CNN website in 2004 called the design of aluminum Christmas trees "clever". The same writer asserted that once the trees overcame their cultural baggage as icons of bad taste, aluminum Christmas trees were actually beautiful decor. The Space Age-feel of the trees made them especially suited to the streamlined home decor of the time period.

== Cultural significance ==
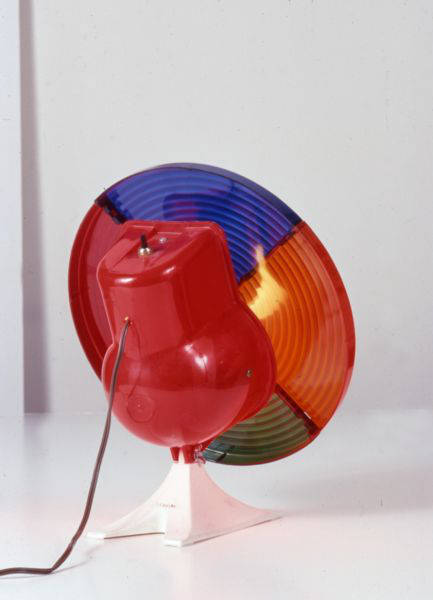
A color wheel for use with an aluminum Christmas tree, from the collection of the Children's Museum of Indianapolis.

The aluminum Christmas tree was used as a symbol of the over-commercialization of Christmas in the 1965 Peanuts holiday special, A Charlie Brown Christmas. The program is considered a classic among Christmas specials, and its mention of the aluminum tree solidified the tree's legendary status while satirizing it as well. In the special, Lucy van Pelt implored Charlie Brown to get a "big, shiny aluminum tree...maybe painted pink" for the group's nativity play. Charlie Brown lamented the commercialization of Christmas and, in a lot surrounded by many huge aluminum trees (depicted, due to limitations of the animation style, as hollow cones of sheet metal, and much larger than most aluminum trees of the era), purchased a small, scrawny natural tree on a whim instead.

The re-emergent popularity of aluminum Christmas trees has allowed them to find their way into museum collections. One example is the Aluminum Christmas Tree Museum (officially known as the Aluminum Tree and Aesthetically Challenged Seasonal Ornament Museum and Research Center). The museum, variously located in Brevard or Asheville, North Carolina was called "campy" by Fodor's in 2009. The Children's Museum of Indianapolis holds a vintage aluminum Christmas tree and color wheel in its collections. The Wisconsin Historical Museum has held the "'Tis the Season" exhibition at least twice, featuring a collection of vintage aluminum Christmas trees.

== See also ==
- Feather Christmas tree
- Festivus
