= Sri Lankan Christmas tree =

Artificial Christmas tree in Colombo, Sri Lanka

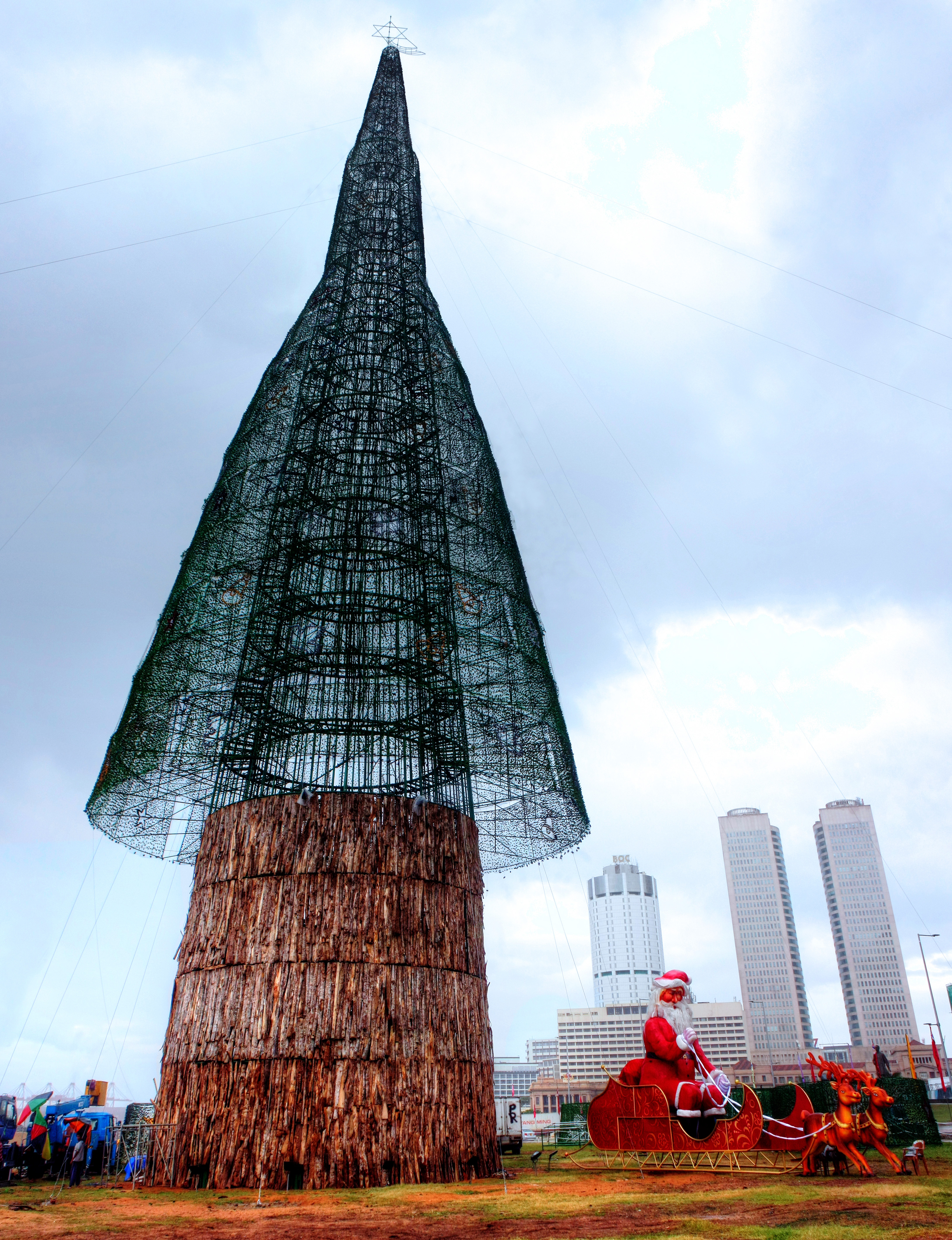
- Sri Lankan Christmas tree with a Santa and sled, in distance BOC & Colombo WTC.
- Location: Colombo, Sri Lanka
- Height: 72.1 m (236 ft 6.58 in)
- Open: 24 December 2016
- Cost: US$80,000
- Materials: Iron, wood, plastic net
- Notable: Tallest artificial Christmas tree

The Sri Lankan Christmas tree is the world's tallest artificial Christmas tree. It was built on the Galle Face Green in Colombo, Sri Lanka, the tree is 72.1 m (236 ft 6.58 in) tall and opened on Christmas Eve 2016.

The cone-shaped tree is a steel-and-wire frame made from scrap metal and wood, and covered by plastic netting. It is decorated with approximately one million natural pine cones painted gold, green, red and silver colors. It has 600,000 LED bulbs which illuminate the tree at night. On the top of the tree there is a 6-metre-tall (20 ft) Christmas star with bulbs, weighing about 60 kg (130 lb). The tree cost 12 million Sri Lankan rupees (about US$80,000). The tree was constructed by 150 employees of the Sri Lankan Ministry of Ports and Shipping with support from other parties.

Construction work began in August 2016 but was abandoned in the first week of December after the Sri Lankan Catholic Church criticised it as "waste of money", and added "Construction work should be abandoned. Christmas is an occasion for sharing funds with the needy, not to waste money on lavishness... The market economy is using religion as a tool for selling Christmas."

Later, work on the tree recommenced after a meeting with Catholic Cardinal Malcolm Ranjith, the archbishop of Colombo. Originally the tree was planned to be 100 metres (330 ft) tall but the height had to be reduced to 72.1 metres (237 ft) due to the delays in construction. A 6-metre-tall (20 ft) Santa Claus with a sled was placed near the tree.

The tree broke the previous world record for the tallest artificial Christmas tree, which was 56 metres (184 ft) tall and constructed in Guangzhou, China in 2015 by GZ ThinkBig Culture Communication Co. Ltd.

== Comparison ==
Comparison of Sri Lankan Christmas tree with some other structures as follows:

1. Sri Lankan Christmas tree [72.1 m]
2. Guangzhou Christmas tree [56 m]
3. Colombo WTC [152 m]
4. Statue of Liberty (Including pedestal) 45 + 47 = [93 m]
5. Christ the Redeemer (Including pedestal) 30 + 8 = [38 m]

== Current status ==
The tree had several criticisms apart from the Catholic Church. It did not have enough ornaments and firs. When compared with the tree that was built in Guangzhou, Sri Lankan tree failed to have green synthetic foliage. Also, it gave complete visibility of its internal frames or structure. The shape of the tree did not give enough appeal as a traditional Christmas tree, but rather resembled the shape a rocket. It was dismantled in January 2017. The tree is recorded by Guinness World Records in December 2017.
