= Chicktionary =

- Developer(s): Blockdot
- Publisher(s): Kewlbox
- Platform(s): Microsoft Windows
- Genre(s): Word game

Chicktionary is a word game available on the Microsoft Internet search page. Chicktionary was developed by Blockdot, a Dallas, Texas based developer of games and branded entertainment applications. The game was originally developed as "Fowl Words" but later changed after it was concluded that the play on words "fowl" would be confused with "foul" and alienate potential players.

The game is a variation on the game of Anagrams. It features an egg rack, replete with three-letter, four-letter, five-letter, six-letter and seven-letter sequences of eggs. Seven chickens appear at the bottom, each bearing a letter. When the player clicks on a hen, its letter is dropped into a box. Clicking on three or more hens in sequence can create a word. If it is a valid word, a sequence of eggs of the appropriate length will be filled up with the word.

The goal is to fill the quotas of 11 three-letter words, 10 four-letter words, 10 five-letter words, 3 six-letter words and 1 seven letter-word. Players get 20 points for finishing a round by filling up all the sequences of eggs. There are two modes of game time and infinitude. The timed version allows players to form words within two minutes per round and there is no limit in the other mode.

Points are redeemable for real prizes—20,000 points in Chicktionary could be redeemed for a copy of Windows Vista Home Premium.

Fox News reported that the popularity of this search engine vis-à-vis Google and Yahoo increased due to the introduction of this game. Microsoft's share of the search market increased by 13.2% in June 2007.

A problem that has arisen with this game is the creation of bots to play and win these games and gain prizes for human bot programmers. Microsoft, however, says it detects and catches bots and nullifies their points and winnings.

Chicktionary was released on the iPhone in November 2008. It was released on Android phones in August 2009. The play for redeemable points program was terminated in 2012.e 2007. A new version of game, Chicktionary Coop, was released in November 2012.

It was originally created by Dan Ferguson https://danferguson.com and Mike Bielinski. Both Dan and Mike were two of the original founders of Blockdot.
