= Pre-lit tree =

Type of artificial tree

A pre-lit tree is an artificial Christmas tree which is pre-wired with Christmas lights. The lights are wrapped around the tree before it is sold, reducing set up time and making storage simpler. The lights cannot usually be removed from the tree because they are normally embedded within the artificial branches. The product may be sold as a kit - the user assembles the tree and plugs it into an electrical outlet - or the dealer may assemble it before the sale. Larger trees usually contain traditional strands of bulb lights or LEDs, while smaller tabletop trees may have fiber-optic branches. Pre-lit trees are categorised under the headings of electrical goods.

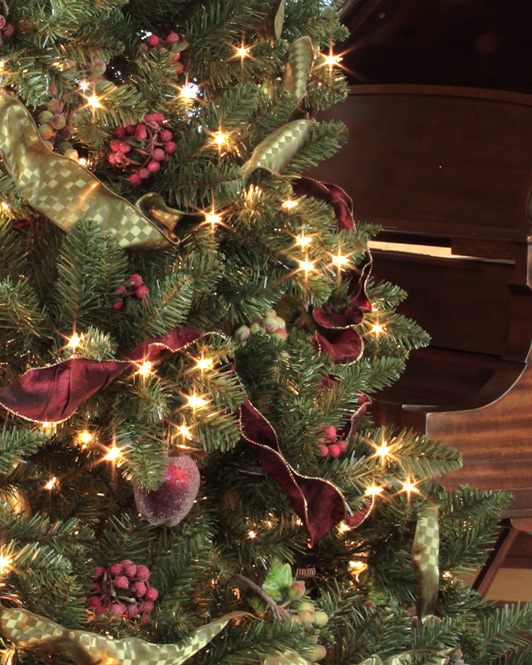
An example of a pre-lit tree with Christmas decorations.

== History ==
The first lighted Christmas trees made use of candles. Attaching the candles was a difficult process, and proved to be a fire hazard. The tree could not be safely left unattended when the candles were lit. A bucket of water also had to be kept near the tree and someone had to keep watch for a possible fire. Candle wax was expensive, so later trees used lamps that were made from nutshell halves filled with oil and a wick. More elegant lamps were made from different colours of glass. The new candle holder, called a counterbalance candle holder, had a weight attached to the bottom that kept the candle standing upright. However, even with these improvements, the trees still proved to be fire hazards.

The invention of the electric light added a new dimension to Christmas trees. In 1882 an inventor named Edward Hibberd Johnson working for Thomas Edison made a string of red, white, and blue electric light bulbs and used them to decorate the Christmas tree at his home in New York City. These coloured lights that were strung on a tree provided the earliest version of contemporary Christmas lights. However, Christmas tree lights were still experimental throughout the 1880s.

Miniature Christmas lights were first developed in 1895 by Ralph E. Morris, an employee of the New England Telephone Company. Morris’ idea for miniature Christmas lights occurred as he was looking at the tiny bulbs on telephone switchboards. However, many Americans still distrusted the safety of electric lights throughout the early 1900s and candles were still used to illuminate trees. The early Christmas tree lights were simply night-lights strung together to form light strings. When General Electric commercially introduced Christmas lights, they quickly became popular. Edison Electric soon followed suit with an electric Christmas lamp.

In the early 1990s the world's largest artificial Christmas tree maker, Boto Company (bankrupted in January 2008) started the first production of pre-lit trees supplied to Target stores. Recent technical advances in the manufacturing process of pre-lit trees has made them easy to assemble and realistic looking.

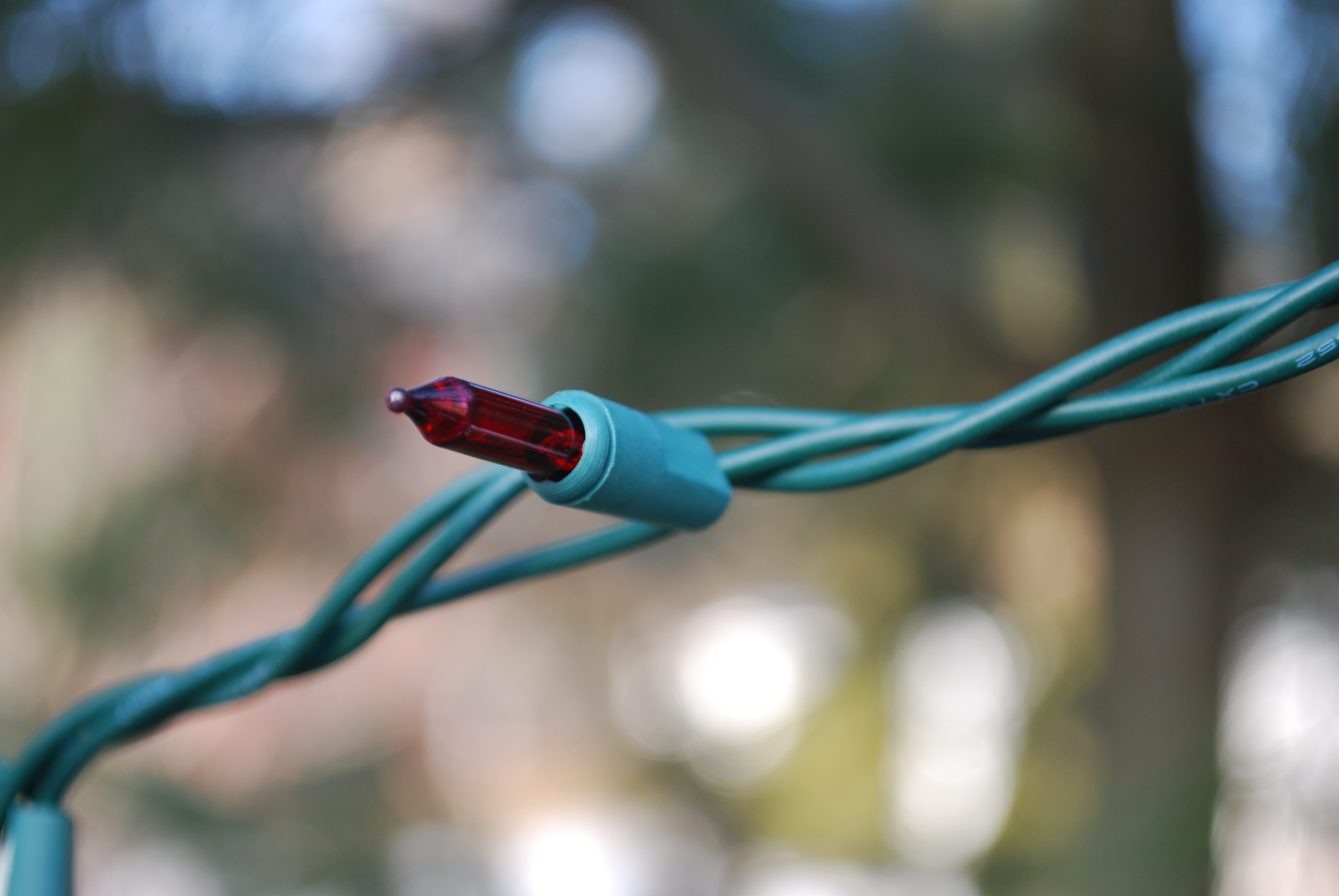
Closeup of a mini light usually found on pre-lit trees

== Safety issues ==
=== Shock and fire hazards ===
The U.S. Consumer Product Safety Commission (CPSC) has advised people to look for and eliminate potential dangers from holiday lights and decorations that could lead to fires and injuries. Each year, hospital emergency rooms treat about 1,300 people for injuries related to holiday lights and 6,200 people for injuries related to holiday decorations and Christmas trees.

With artificial trees, the risk of fire can be lower compared with real trees due to the use of fire-resistant coatings, however, these can lose their effectiveness over time. Pre-lit trees are more hazardous because of their integrated electrical components; the following are examples of safety-related recalls for pre-lit trees:

- The CPSC announced recalls by Target on 7' Artificial Pine Christmas Trees and accompanying extension cords in 1993 due to fire risk from the extension cords supplied with the lighted trees, which may overheat or melt.
- Walgreens, of Deerfield, Ill., voluntarily recalled about 9,000 artificial Christmas trees with fiber optic lights in 2000. A colour wheel in the tree stand that is used to light the tree can overheat and catch fire.
- In 2007 the CPSC ordered a recall of Pre-lit Palm Trees imported by iObjectSolutions Inc. for hazards of overheating and electrical shocks. If the electrical connectors were not fully inserted, they could overheat and pose electrical shocks and fire hazards.

=== Toxic substances ===
For pre-lit trees, the real threat of toxic substances are mainly the lead (Pb), mercury (Hg), cadmium (Cd) and chromium (Cr) associated with the lights attached on the trees.

=== Safety standards ===
All pre-lit trees are being classified into electrical products. They are subject to the laws and safety standards for electrical products such as UL in the United States, CSA in Canada, AS/NZS in Australia and New Zealand, GS in Germany, BS in the United Kingdom, and RoHS in the European Union.

== Storage ==
Along with the safety issues, another aspect to consider when using pre-lit trees are storage conditions: Complications can arise because the lights on a pre-lit Christmas tree are tied together. Using the box or bag that the Christmas tree came in is by far the most common option. Since the container is designed specifically for that tree, it can be moved and stored securely with this method.

Many companies offer bags to be used for handling pre-lit and other artificial trees. The tree branches are pulled upwards and the bag is placed under the tree. Using its handles, the bag is then pulled up over the tree, and the bag can be stored by hanging it from the handles.
