= Feather Christmas tree =

Type of artificial Christmas tree

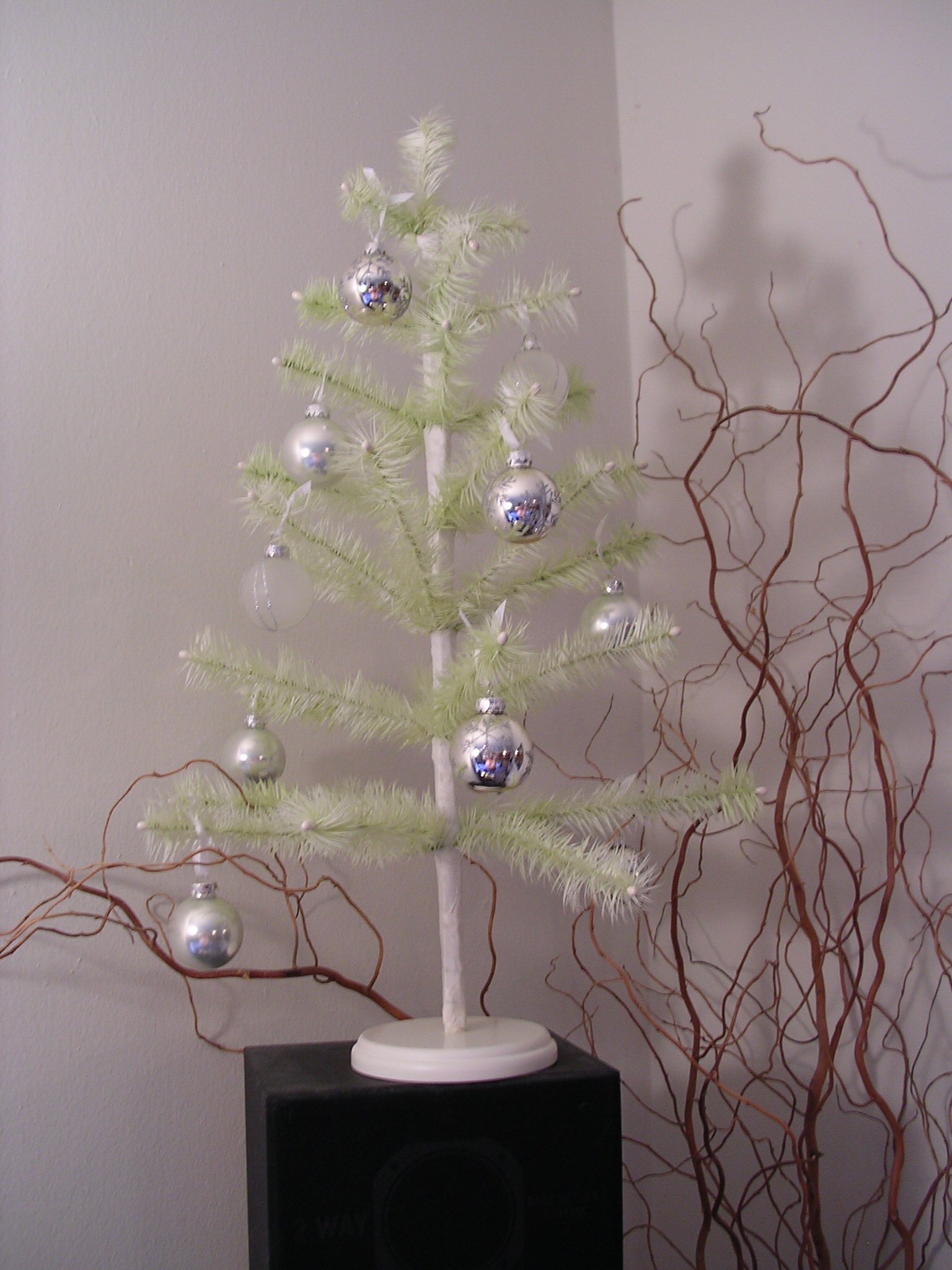
A replica of a 19th-century feather tree, the branches are tinted light green

A feather Christmas tree is a type of artificial Christmas tree that is generally considered one of the first artificial trees used as a Christmas tree. They originated in Germany in the late 19th century and became popular in the United States during the early 20th century.

== History ==
Feather Christmas trees were first created in Germany in the 1880s or 1890s and are regarded as one of the first types of artificial Christmas trees. These first artificial trees were, in part, a response to growing environmental concerns in the late 19th century concerning deforestation associated with the harvest of Christmas trees in Germany. The tradition of feather Christmas trees was brought to the United States by German immigrants in places such as Pennsylvania and Texas.

Feather Christmas trees became popular during the early 20th century, and were sold by department stores in the United States. Benefits touted for feather trees included the elimination of a trip to the tree lot and the lack of shed needles. Today, feather Christmas trees are valued as a collectible antique. One 90-centimeter (36-inch) German tree sold at auction in 2008 for $230.

== Design ==
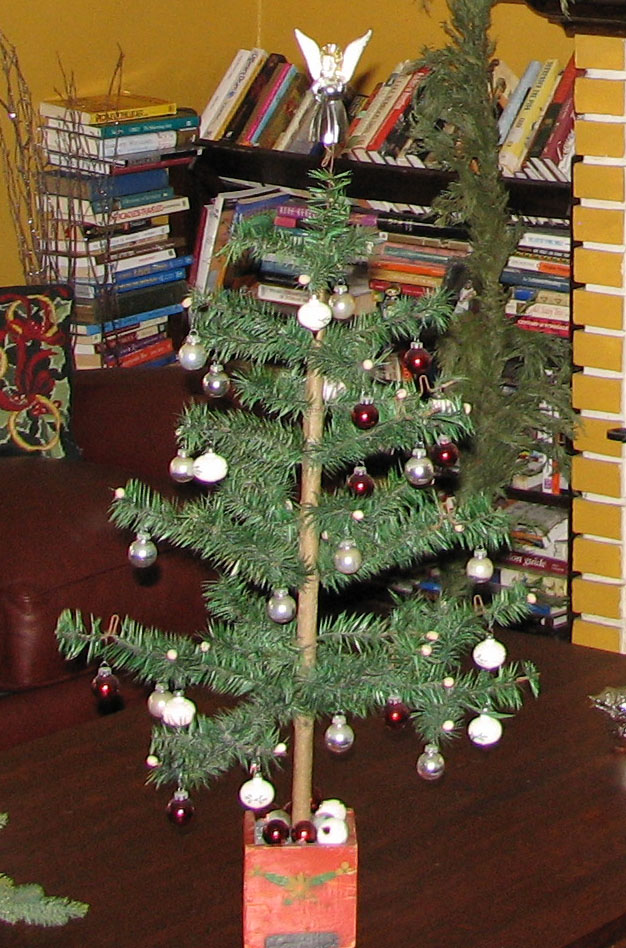
An antique feather Christmas tree, note the central dowel

Feather trees were initially made of green-dyed goose feathers which were attached to wire branches. The feathers were split and then secured with wire to form the branches. These wire branches were then wrapped around a central dowel which acted as the trunk. The branches were widely spaced to keep the candles from starting a fire, which allowed ample space for ornamentation. Feather Christmas trees ranged widely in size, from a small 5-centimeter (2-inch) tree to a large 2.5-meter (98-inch) tree sold in department stores during the 1920s. Often, the tree branches were tipped with artificial red berries which acted as candle holders.
