= A Charlie Brown Christmas =

1965 Peanuts animated television special

- Genre: Christmas; Family; Comedy
- Based on: Peanuts by Charles M. Schulz
- Written by: Charles M. Schulz
- Directed by: Bill Melendez
- Voices of: Peter Robbins; Christopher Shea; Kathy Steinberg; Tracy Stratford; Bill Melendez; Ann Altieri; Chris Doran; Sally Dryer; Karen Mendelson; Geoffrey Ornstein
- Music by: Vince Guaraldi
- Opening theme: "Christmas Time Is Here"
- Ending theme: "Hark! The Herald Angels Sing"
- Country of origin: United States
- Original language: English

Production
- Executive producer: Lee Mendelson
- Producer: Bill Melendez
- Editor: Robert T. Gillis
- Running time: 25 minutes
- Production companies: Lee Mendelson Film Productions; Bill Melendez Productions
- Budget: $76,000-96,000

Original release
- Network: CBS
- Release: December 9, 1965

Related
- A Boy Named Charlie Brown (1963); Charlie Brown's All Stars! (1966)

A Charlie Brown Christmas is a 1965 American animated television special. It is the first TV special based on the comic strip Peanuts, by Charles M. Schulz, and features the voices of Peter Robbins, Christopher Shea, Kathy Steinberg, Tracy Stratford, and Bill Melendez. Produced by Lee Mendelson and directed by Melendez, the program made its debut on the CBS television network on December 9, 1965, four days after it was broadcast in Canada. (Note: In Canada, A Charlie Brown Christmas debuted on CTV on December 5, 1965, four days before the CBS debut. The broadcast time varied by station; in Winnipeg, it was seen at 4:30 p.m. on CJAY-TV.) In the special, Charlie Brown (Robbins) finds himself depressed despite the onset of the cheerful holiday season. After Lucy Van Pelt (Stratford) suggests he direct a neighborhood Christmas play, his best efforts are ignored and mocked by his peers when he chooses a puny Christmas tree as a centerpiece.

After the comic strip's debut in 1950, Peanuts had become a worldwide phenomenon by the mid-1960s. The special was commissioned and sponsored by The Coca-Cola Company, and was written over a period of several weeks, and produced on a small budget in six months. In casting the characters, the producers took an unconventional route, hiring child actors. The program's soundtrack was similarly unorthodox, featuring a jazz score by pianist Vince Guaraldi.

Its lack of a laugh track (a staple in American television animation in this period), in addition to its tone, pacing, music, and animation, led both the producers and the network to predict the project would be a disaster. However, contrary to their collective apprehension, A Charlie Brown Christmas received high ratings and acclaim from critics. It received an Emmy and a Peabody Award, and became an annual presentation in the United States, airing on broadcast television during the Christmas season for 56 years before becoming exclusively available on Apple TV+ streaming service. Its success paved the way for a series of Peanuts television specials and films. Its jazz soundtrack achieved commercial success, selling five million copies in the US. Live theatrical versions of A Charlie Brown Christmas have been staged.

== Plot ==
On their way to join their friends' ice skating on a frozen pond, Charlie Brown confesses to Linus Van Pelt that, despite all the things he likes about the Christmas season, he is still depressed. After Linus's reproach, and a put-down from Violet, he visits Lucy Van Pelt's psychiatric booth and tells her his problem. She suggests he direct the group's annual Christmas play to get involved, and he accepts.

Charlie Brown becomes even more discouraged by his observations of Christmas's commercialization as he heads for the rehearsal: Lucy laments over not receiving real estate for Christmas; Snoopy decorates his doghouse for a neighborhood lights and display contest; and Charlie Brown's younger sister Sally asks him to write a greedy letter to Santa Claus. At the rehearsal, Charlie Brown finds a play fit for the 1960s with dancing, lively music, an uncooperative cast, and a "Christmas Queen" (Lucy). Unable to control the cast, Charlie Brown decides the play needs a more "proper mood", and recommends a Christmas tree. Lucy suggests a big, pink aluminum Christmas tree, then sends him and Linus to get one.

At the tree lot, Charlie Brown picks the only real tree there, a small sapling. Linus questions his choice, but Charlie Brown believes that once decorated, it will be perfect. Upon their return, Lucy, Violet, Patty, and Frieda scorn him and the tree and walk away laughing. Crestfallen, Charlie Brown asks if anyone knows what Christmas is all about. Linus says he does, walks to center stage, asks for a spotlight, drops his security blanket, recites the King James Version of the annunciation to the shepherds, picks up his blanket, returns, and says, "That's what Christmas is all about, Charlie Brown."

Realizing that he does not have to let commercialism ruin his Christmas, Charlie Brown takes the tree home to decorate it and show the others that it will work in the play. The others realize they are too hard on Charlie Brown and quietly follow him after listening to Linus's speech. He stops at Snoopy's doghouse, which has won the lights and display contest, and hangs a large red ornament on his tree. The ornament's weight causes the tiny tree to bend to the ground. Believing that he killed the tree, a dejected Charlie Brown walks off.

The others arrive at Snoopy's doghouse and as they all start to see its potential, Linus gently uprights the drooping tree and wraps his blanket around its base to offer some support. After the others hand the tree a makeover using more decorations from the doghouse, even Lucy concedes to Charlie Brown's choice. The children then start humming "Hark! The Herald Angels Sing". Hearing them, Charlie Brown returns to see that the sapling is a fully decorated Christmas tree. All the children shout, "Merry Christmas, Charlie Brown!", and then sing "Hark" with Charlie Brown and Snoopy (original version only) joining in as snow begins to fall.

== Cast ==
- Peter Robbins as Charlie Brown
- Christopher Shea as Linus Van Pelt
- Tracy Stratford as Lucy Van Pelt
- Kathy Steinberg as Sally Brown
- Chris Doran as Schroeder and Shermy
- Geoffrey Orstein as Pig-Pen
- Sally Dryer as Violet
- Ann Altieri as Frieda
- Bill Melendez as Snoopy
- Karen Mendelson as Patty
- Choral vocals: Members of the children's choir of St. Paul's Episcopal Church (San Rafael, California) directed by Robert "Barry" Mineah. The choir was also featured on the Vince Guaraldi recording At Grace Cathedral.

== Production ==
=== Development ===
By the early 1960s, Charles M. Schulz's comic strip Peanuts had gained enormous popularity. Television producer Lee Mendelson acknowledged the strip's cultural impression and had an idea for a documentary on its success, phoning Schulz to propose the idea. Schulz, an avid baseball fan, recognized Mendelson from his documentary on ballplayer Willie Mays, A Man Named Mays, and invited him to his home in Sebastopol, California, to discuss the project. Their meeting was cordial, with the plan to produce a half-hour documentary set. Mendelson wanted to feature roughly "one or two" minutes of animation, and Schulz suggested animator Bill Melendez, with whom he collaborated some years before on a spot for the Ford Motor Company. Mendelson later stated that he was drawn to doing an animated Charlie Brown after working on A Man Named Mays, noting that Mays was arguably the best baseball player of all time, while Charlie Brown, in a running gag in the strips, was one of the worst, making him a natural follow-up subject to his previous work.

Despite the popularity of the strip and acclaim from advertisers, networks were not interested in the special. By April 1965, Time featured the Peanuts gang on its magazine cover, prompting a call from John Allen of the New York-based McCann Erickson Agency. Mendelson imagined he would sell his documentary, and blindly agreed to Allen's proposal: an animated half-hour Peanuts Christmas special. The Coca-Cola Company was looking for a special to sponsor during the holiday season. "The bad news is that today is Wednesday and they'll need an outline in Atlanta by Monday," Allen remarked to Mendelson. He quickly contacted Schulz, and the two got to work with plans for a Peanuts Christmas special. The duo prepared an outline for the Coca-Cola executives in less than one day, and Mendelson would later recall that the bulk of ideas came from Schulz, whose "ideas flowed nonstop." According to Mendelson, their pitch to Coca-Cola consisted of "winter scenes, a school play, a scene to be read from the Bible, and a sound track combining jazz and traditional music." The outline did not change over the course of its production.

As Allen was in Europe, the duo received no feedback on their pitch for several days. When Allen got in touch with them, he informed them that Coca-Cola wanted to buy the special, but also wanted it for an early December broadcast, giving the duo just six months to scramble together a team to produce the special. Mendelson assured him – without complete confidence in his statements – that this would be no problem. Following this, A Charlie Brown Christmas entered production, and was completed just ten days shy of its national broadcast premiere.

=== Writing ===
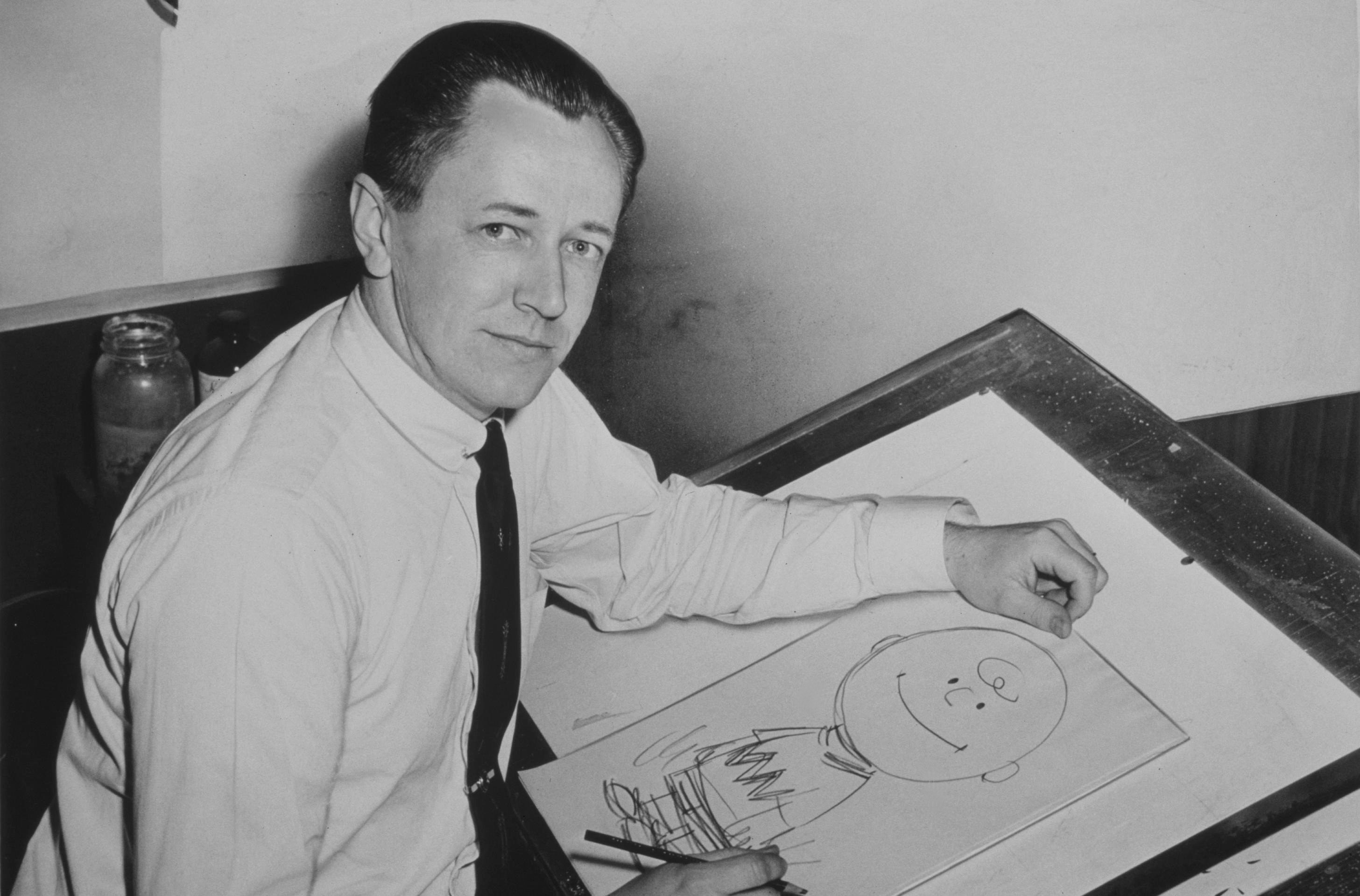
Charles M. Schulz in 1956; his goal for the special was to focus on the true meaning of Christmas

Schulz's main goal for a Peanuts-based Christmas special was to focus on the true meaning of Christmas. He desired to juxtapose this theme with interspersed shots of snow and ice-skating, perhaps inspired by his own childhood growing up in St. Paul, Minnesota. He also created the idea for the school play, and mixing jazz with traditional Christmas carols. Schulz was adamant about Linus's reading of the Bible, despite Mendelson and Melendez's concerns that religion was a controversial topic, especially on television. Melendez recalled Schulz turned to him and remarked, "If we don't do it, who will?" Schulz's estimation proved accurate, and in the 1960s, fewer than nine percent of television Christmas episodes contained a substantive reference to religion, according to university researcher Stephen Lind.

Schulz's faith in the Bible stemmed from his Midwest background and religious and historical studies; as such, aspects of religion would be a topic of study throughout his life. According to a 2015 "spiritual biography", Schulz's religion was personal and complex, and would be integrated in a number of his programs.

The program's script has been described as "barebones", and was completed in only a few weeks. In the days following the special's sale to Coca-Cola, Mendelson and animator Bill Melendez met with Schulz in his home to expand upon the ideas promised in the pitch. Mendelson remembered that on the previous Christmas Day he and his spouse had read Hans Christian Andersen's "The Fir-Tree" to their children. Schulz countered with the idea that there be a tree with the spirit of lead character Charlie Brown. They spoke at length about creating an official theme that was neither jazz nor traditional to open the program. Schulz wanted a part of the special to feature the character of Schroeder performing Beethoven, and Mendelson combined this with the inclusion of Vince Guaraldi's "Linus and Lucy" number. Schulz penned the script for A Charlie Brown Christmas, with Melendez plotting out the animation via a storyboard. His storyboard contained six panels for each shot, spanning a combined eighty or-so pages.

Mendelson also suggested they employ a laugh track, a staple of television animation, but Schulz rejected this idea immediately. "Up until then, many, if not all, animated shows had laugh tracks," said Mendelson. "As we were discussing how we would handle our special, I said very casually, 'I assume we'll have a laugh track.' It was a statement, not a question. Sparky just got up and quietly walked out of the room. We looked at each other, then Bill said, 'Well, I guess we won't have a laugh track.' Sparky came back in the room, and we went on with the meeting as if the subject had never come up." Schulz felt strongly that the audience at home should not be instructed when to laugh.

=== Casting ===
In casting the silent comic strip characters of Peanuts, the trio pulled from their personalities. Lead character Charlie Brown's voice was decided to be downbeat and nondescript ("blah," as Mendelson observed), while Lucy should be bold and forthright. Linus's voice, it was decided, would combine sophistication with childlike innocence. Mendelson recognized that the character of Snoopy was the strip's most popular character who seemed to seize "the best jokes," but realized they could not cast a voice for the cartoon dog. "In the process, we gained a veritable 'canine Harpo Marx,'" Mendelson later wrote. Melendez suggested he provide gibberish for Snoopy's mutterings, and simply speed up the tape to prevent viewers from knowing. There are no adult characters in the strip or in this special. Later specials would introduce an offscreen teacher; her lines are eschewed for the sound of a muted trombone (suggested by Guaraldi) as the team behind the specials found it humorous.

With this in mind, the trio set out to cast the characters, which proved to be a daunting process. Casting for Charlie Brown proved most difficult, as it required both good acting skills but also the ability to appear nonchalant. The producers picked eight-year-old Peter Robbins, already known for his roles spanning television, film, and advertisements. Robbins considered Charlie Brown to be one of his favorite characters, and despite leaving acting as an adult, he considered his time in the role a highlight of his life. His godmother, Hollywood agent Hazel McMillen, discovered Christopher Shea, who would become Linus in the special. His slight lisp, according to Mendelson, gave him a "youthful sweetness," while his emotional script reading "gave him power and authority as well." Tracy Stratford played the role of Lucy, with the creators being impressed by her attitude and professionalism. Kathy Steinberg was the youngest of the performers, just six years old at the time of recording. Too young to read, the producers had to give her one line at a time to recite. Robbins remembered Melendez did this for him as well, joking that he also mistakenly copied his Latino accent. Mendelson desired to have non-actors (not "Hollywood kids") perform on the special, and he sent tape recorders home with his employees for their children to audition.

Much of the background cast came from Mendelson's home neighborhood in northern California. According to Robbins, the children viewed the script's sophisticated dialogue as "edgy," finding several words and phrases, among them "eastern syndicate", difficult to pronounce. He recalled the recording sessions as chaotic, with excited children running rampant. Nevertheless, the recording of A Charlie Brown Christmas was completed in one day. Jefferson Airplane was recording next door and came over to obtain the children's autographs. Following the special's broadcast, the children became wildly popular in their respective elementary schools; Robbins recalled groups approaching him asking him to recite lines of dialogue.

=== Animation ===
Animation for A Charlie Brown Christmas was created by Bill Melendez Productions. Mendelson had no idea whether or not completing a half-hour's worth of animation would be possible given the production's six-month schedule, but Melendez confirmed its feasibility. In actuality, animation was only completed in the final four months of production. CBS initially wanted an hour's worth of animation, but Melendez talked them down to a half-hour special, believing an hour of television animation was too much. Having never worked on a half-hour special before, Melendez phoned William Hanna of Hanna-Barbera for advice, but Hanna declined to give any. CBS gave a budget of $76,000 to produce the show and it went $20,000 over budget. The first step in creating the animation was to make a pencil drawing, afterwards inking and painting the drawing onto a cel. The cel was then placed onto a painted background. There are 13,000 drawings in the special, with 12 frames per second to create the illusion of movement.

Melendez had previously worked for Warner Bros. and Disney, and working on Peanuts-related material gave him a chance to animate a truly flat cartoon design. The movement of Schulz's characters, particularly the Peanuts gang, was limited. The character of Snoopy, however, proved the exception to the rule. "He can do anything – move and dance – and he's very easy to animate," said Melendez. Schulz had envisioned the special as essentially talking heads reciting the script; animator Bill Littlejohn recalled meeting resistance from Schulz when he and Melendez designed the sequence of Snoopy dancing on Schroeder's piano, as Schulz was concerned it distracted too much from the plot.

== Soundtrack ==
The soundtrack to A Charlie Brown Christmas is an unorthodox mix of traditional Christmas music and jazz. The jazz portions were created by the Vince Guaraldi Trio. Producer Lee Mendelson, a fan of jazz, heard Guaraldi's crossover hit "Cast Your Fate to the Wind" on the radio not long after completion of his documentary Charlie Brown & Charles Schulz, and contacted the musician to produce music for the special. Guaraldi composed the music for the project, creating an entire piece, "Linus and Lucy," to serve as the theme. When Coca-Cola commissioned A Charlie Brown Christmas in spring 1965, Guaraldi returned to write the music. The first instrumentals for the special were recorded by Guaraldi at Glendale, California's Whitney Studio with bassist Monty Budwig and drummer Colin Bailey. Recycling "Linus and Lucy" from the earlier special, Guaraldi completed two new originals for the special, "Skating", and "Christmas Time Is Here". In the weeks preceding the premiere, Mendelson encountered trouble finding a lyricist for Guaraldi's instrumental intro, and penned "Christmas Time is Here" in "about 15 minutes" on the back of an envelope.

The special opens and closes with a choir of children, culled from St. Paul's Episcopal Church in San Rafael, California, performing "Christmas Time Is Here" and "Hark! The Herald Angels Sing". One of the singers, Candace Hackett Shively, went on to become an elementary school teacher, and sent a letter of gratitude to Schulz after he announced his retirement in 2000. In the letter, she recalls recording the choir at Fantasy Studios and going out for ice cream afterwards, while also saying she tells the story to her grade-schoolers each holiday season. The recording sessions were conducted in late autumn 1965 and were cut in three separate sessions over two weeks. They often ran late into the night, resulting in angry parents, some who forbade their children from returning; consequently, numerous new children were present at each session. The children were directed by Barry Mineah, who demanded perfection from the choir. Mendelson and Guaraldi disagreed, desiring the "kids to sound like kids"; they used a slightly off-key version of "Hark! The Herald Angels Sing" in the final cut. Children were paid five dollars for their participation. In addition, the children recorded dialogue for the special's final scene, in which the crowd of kids shout "Merry Christmas, Charlie Brown!"

The soundtrack for the special was recorded during these sessions, with decisions regarding timing and phrasing determined quickly. Guaraldi brought in bassist Fred Marshall and drummer Jerry Granelli to record the music, and spent time later re-recording earlier tracks, including covers of "The Christmas Song" and "Greensleeves." The eventual LP release credited Guaraldi solely, neglecting to mention the other musicians; Guaraldi was notorious for never keeping records of his session players. Nearly three decades later, in an effort to resolve the matter, Fantasy surmised that the recordings with Budwig and Bailey were employed in the special, while Marshall and Granelli recorded the album. Despite this, other individuals have come forward claiming to have recorded the special's music: bassists Eugene Firth and Al Obidinski, and drummers Paul Distel and Benny Barth. Firth and Distel are listed as performers on a studio-session report Guaraldi filed for the American Federation of Musicians.

A Charlie Brown Christmas was voted into the Grammy Hall of Fame in 2007, and added to the Library of Congress's National Recording Registry list of "culturally, historically, or aesthetically important" American sound recordings in 2012.

"I have always felt that one of the key elements that made that show was the music," said Mendelson in 2010. "It gave it a contemporary sound that appealed to all ages. Although Vince had never scored anything else and although I was basically a documentary film maker at the time, we started to work together on the cues because we both loved jazz and we both played the piano. So he would bring in the material for each scene and we would go over it scene by scene. Most of the time, the music worked perfectly. But there were times we would either not use something or use it somewhere else. We went through this same process on all sixteen shows. Although there was always some left over music, most of the time what he wrote and performed is what went on the air."

== Reception ==
All involved believed the special would be a disaster. Melendez first saw the completed animation at a showing in a theater in the days before its premiere, turning to his crew of animators and remarking, "My golly, we've killed it." Melendez was embarrassed, but one of the animators, Ed Levitt, was more positive regarding the special, telling him it was "the best special [he'll] ever make [...] This show is going to run for a hundred years." Mendelson was similarly discouraged in his assumptions of the show's quality, and when he showed the film to network executives in New York, their opinions were also negative. Their complaints included the show's slow pace, the music not fitting, and the animation too simple. "I really believed, if it hadn't already been scheduled for the following week, there's no way they were gonna broadcast that show," Mendelson later said. Executives had invited television critic Richard Burgheim of Time to view the special, and debated whether showing it to him would be a good idea. His review, printed the following week, was positive, praising the special as unpretentious and writing that "A Charlie Brown Christmas is one children's special this season that bears repeating."

The program premiered on CBS on December 9, 1965, at 7:30 pm ET (pre-empting The Munsters), and was viewed by 45% of those watching television that evening, with the number of homes watching the special an estimated 15,490,000, placing it at number two in the ratings, behind Bonanza on NBC. The special received critical acclaim: The Hollywood Reporter deemed the show "delightfully novel and amusing," while the Weekly Variety dubbed it "fascinating and haunting." Bob Williams of the New York Post praised the "very neat transition from comic page to screen," while Lawrence Laurent of The Washington Post declared that "natural-born loser Charlie Brown finally turned up a real winner last night." Harriet Van Horne of the New York World-Telegram hailed the scene in which Linus recites scripture, commenting, "Linus' reading of the story of the Nativity was, quite simply, the dramatic highlight of the season." Harry Harris of The Philadelphia Inquirer called the program "a yule classic [...] generated quiet warmth and amusement," and Terrence O'Flaherty of the San Francisco Chronicle wrote, "Charlie Brown was a gem of a television show." Ben Gross of the New York Daily News praised the special's "charm and good taste," while Rick DuBrow of United Press International predicted, "the Peanuts characters last night staked out a claim to a major television future."

The film has an aggregated review score of 86% based on 21 reviews on Rotten Tomatoes. Of the three negative reviews, two come from the same 2020 episode of Medium Popcorn, a podcast in which both hosts gave the special a one-out-of-five stars review. The third is a 2005 two-out-of-five star review from Emanuel Levy that is no longer available.

The show's positive reviews were highlighted with an ad in trade magazines; one thanked Coca-Cola, CBS, United Features Syndicate, and the show's viewers. Fantasy released the special's soundtrack the first week of December 1965, coinciding with the special's airdate. United Feature Syndicate pushed hard to promote the special, while Word Publishing issued a hardcover adaption of the special. CBS promptly ordered four additional Peanuts specials. A Charlie Brown Christmas was awarded the Emmy Award for Outstanding Children's Program in 1966, making it the second animated TV program to win that award after Hanna-Barbera's The Huckleberry Hound Show. "Charlie Brown is not used to winning, so we thank you," Schulz joked.

When the special was aired for a second time in December 1966, it once again ranked No. 2 in the ratings, and again behind only Bonanza. In 1970, a viewer survey by Clarke Williamson ranked the special as the best Christmas special to air that year.

In 2022, an internal poll of writers at Fatherly ranked the special at 62 in a list of the 100 greatest family-friendly films of all time, one of only two productions made specifically for television to make the list (the other being the 1966 version of How the Grinch Stole Christmas!). In its summary, the writers noted that the special's technical flaws "are what makes A Charlie Brown Christmas feel distinct and special rather than generic" and that its low-budget feel fit the theme of the story.

== Television broadcasts ==
=== CBS ===
The special was originally broadcast on CBS in 1965 and rerun each year from 1966 until 2000.

The original broadcasts included references to the sponsor, Coca-Cola. Because of Dolly Madison's eventual co-sponsorship of the series, as well as subsequent FCC laws mandating the separation of commercial material from the actual program material, subsequent broadcasts and home media releases removed all references to Coca-Cola products. Broadcasts of the special in later years also had some scenes, animation, and sound effects redone for correction. Snoopy's dog bowl was repainted red instead of white, Lucy now makes a whirling noise when scared out of her psychiatric booth, new animation was placed in scenes where the children dance on stage after the first time to avoid repetition, music was added in the background of the rehearsal scenes, and Snoopy no longer sings with the children in the final carol, amongst others.

Removed from some subsequent broadcasts is a scene in which Linus throws a snowball at a tin can using his blanket. For several years it was rumored the can was a Coca-Cola can. An extant copy of the original print disproves this rumor, showing the can was always a generic tin can. In 1997, CBS promoted the special as “uncut, with scenes you haven’t seen in years”.

=== ABC ===
Beginning with the 2001 holiday season, ABC held rights to the special. On December 6, 2001, a half-hour documentary on the special titled The Making of 'A Charlie Brown Christmas' (hosted by Whoopi Goldberg) aired on ABC. This documentary has been released as a special feature on the DVD and Blu-ray editions of the special. In subsequent years, to allow the special in an hour timeslot to be broadcast uncut for time, the animated vignette collection, Charlie Brown's Christmas Tales, is broadcast in the remaining time for that hour.

The show's 40th anniversary broadcast on December 6, 2005, had the highest ratings in its time slot.

The 50th anniversary broadcast aired on November 30, 2015, and it featured a full two-hour time slot that was padded by a special, It's Your 50th Christmas, Charlie Brown, which was hosted by Kristen Bell, and featured musical performances by Kristin Chenoweth, Matthew Morrison, Sarah McLachlan, Boyz II Men, Pentatonix, David Benoit, and the All-American Boys Chorus. It also included documentary features. After 18 consecutive years of being broadcast on the network, the special aired on ABC for the last time on December 17, 2019, at 8pm ET/PT.

=== Apple TV+ ===
In October 2020, Apple TV+ acquired exclusive rights to all Peanuts-related media. Under the terms of the agreement, Apple TV+ must make A Charlie Brown Christmas and two other holiday specials (It's the Great Pumpkin, Charlie Brown and A Charlie Brown Thanksgiving) available for free on the platform during a three-day window. The window for A Charlie Brown Christmas was from December 11 to 13, 2020, and in 2025 it was from December 13 through December 14. Subscribers to Apple TV+ have a broader window to watch the specials.

Apple TV+ renewed its exclusive agreement in 2025, extending the streamer's exclusive rights under the same terms through 2030. Non-streaming television rights, should a buyer emerge for them, would be handled by Sony Pictures Television, which acquired majority control of the special along with the rest of the Peanuts library shortly after its renewal with Apple.

=== PBS ===
After mounting criticism over Apple's decision to remove the Peanuts specials from free television, the company announced a deal with PBS to resume the annual broadcast tradition. In accordance with most PBS member stations' non-commercial educational licenses, the special was presented on both PBS and PBS Kids without commercial interruption, with an underwriting message from Apple being the only advertising. PBS, Apple and WildBrain, the rightsholder to the Peanuts television library, announced they had renewed the arrangement in October 2021. PBS did not acquire the broadcast rights for the Peanuts specials in 2022, ending a 57 year run on broadcast television.

== Home media ==
In 1985, the special was released on VHS and Betamax by Media Home Entertainment, along with You're Not Elected, Charlie Brown. In 1987 the special was released on VHS by its kids subsidiary, Hi-Tops Video.

On September 28, 1994, the special was released by Paramount on VHS. A laserdisc was released by Paramount (distributed by Pioneer) in 1996; Side 2 contained the 1979 special You're the Greatest, Charlie Brown. In September 2000 it was released on DVD. Bonus features included the 1992 special It's Christmastime Again, Charlie Brown. On September 23, 2008, Warner Home Video (to which the rights to the Peanuts specials reverted earlier in the year, due to Melendez's connections to WB) released a "remastered" DVD. Bonus features include a restored version of Christmastime Again and a new documentary titled "A Christmas Miracle: The Making of A Charlie Brown Christmas".

On October 6, 2009, it was released in high definition Blu-ray Disc from Warner in remastered Dolby 5.1 surround sound. This disc also contains It's Christmastime Again, A Christmas Miracle, a DVD of the special, and a digital copy.

Since off-network rights to this special have been transferred to Warner Bros., it has become available as a download on the iTunes Store, PlayStation Network, Amazon Instant Video, and Google Play, and includes It's Christmastime Again, Charlie Brown and It's Flashbeagle, Charlie Brown.

In December 2014, a 50th anniversary 2-DVD set was released. It also features the special It's Christmastime Again, Charlie Brown, and the Making of... documentary from previous editions.

On October 31, 2017, it was released on 4K UHD Blu-ray disc containing It's Christmastime Again, Charlie Brown and the Making of... special.

On October 7, 2025, it was released on the DVD and Blu-Ray collection Peanuts: 75th Anniversary Ultimate TV Specials Collection along with 39 other Peanuts specials.

== Legacy ==
A Charlie Brown Christmas has become a Christmas staple in the United States. Within the scope of future Peanuts specials, it established their style, combining thoughtful themes, jazzy scores, and simple animation. It also, according to author Charles Solomon, established the half-hour animated special as a television tradition, inspiring the creation of numerous others, including How the Grinch Stole Christmas! (1966) and Frosty the Snowman (1969). (Earlier animated specials such as Mr. Magoo's Christmas Carol and Rudolph the Red-Nosed Reindeer ran a full hour.) USA Today summarized the program's appeal upon its 40th anniversary in 2005: "Scholars of pop culture say that shining through the program's skeletal plot is the quirky and sophisticated genius that fueled the phenomenal popularity of Schulz's work." Beyond its references to religion, unheard of on television at the time, the special also marked the first time children voiced animated characters.

The special influenced dozens of young aspiring artists and animators, many of whom went on to work within both the comics and animation industries, among them Eric Goldberg (Pocahontas), Pete Docter (Monsters, Inc., Up), Andrew Stanton (Finding Nemo, WALL-E), Jef Mallett (Frazz), and Patrick McDonnell (Mutts). The show's score made an equally pervasive impact on viewers who would later perform jazz, among them David Benoit and George Winston. More directly, the special launched a series of Peanuts films, TV specials (many of them holiday-themed) and other works of entertainment.

Linus's speech near the end of the special was used in the Sidewalk Prophets Christmas song "What a Glorious Night".

The problems encountered during the special's production prompted CBS to place a "premium on quality" for its future Christmas specials, and for How the Grinch Stole Christmas!, CBS allotted Chuck Jones a budget of $315,000, quadrupling its budget compared to A Charlie Brown Christmas.

== Stage adaptation ==
In 2013, Tams-Witmark Music Library, Inc. began licensing an official stage version of the television special authorized by the Schulz family and Lee Mendelson. The stage version follows the television special but includes an optional sing-along section of Christmas songs at the end. It includes all of Vince Guaraldi's music from the television special and the television script is adapted for the stage by Eric Schaeffer. It has been performed at hundreds of schools, churches and community theatres.

== Charlie Brown Christmas tree ==
Charlie Brown (left) and Linus (right) with the Charlie Brown Christmas Tree

Charlie Brown's insistence on a real Christmas tree and disparagement of artificial Christmas trees virtually eliminated demand for aluminum Christmas trees, which were a fad at the time of the special. By 1967, they were no longer manufactured regularly, and they faded from culture to the point that modern viewers of the special are often unfamiliar with this type of artificial tree. Many retailers offer artificial versions of Charlie Brown's small, flimsy Christmas tree for sale.

== See also ==
- List of Christmas films

== Sources ==
- Bang, Derrick (2012). Vince Guaraldi at the Piano. McFarland. ISBN 978-0-7864-5902-5. Archived from the original on January 20, 2022.
- Mendelson, Lee (2013). A Charlie Brown Christmas: The Making of a Tradition. It Books. ISBN 978-0-06-227214-0. Archived from the original on January 20, 2022.
- Solomon, Charles (2013). The Art and Making of Peanuts Animation: Celebrating Fifty Years of Television Specials. Chronicle Books. ISBN 978-1-4521-1091-2. Archived from the original on January 20, 2022.
