= Balsam Hill =

American home decor company

- Type: Private
- Industry: Home Décor Store, Holiday and Christmas Décor, Artificial Christmas Tree
- Founded: 2006
- Founder: Thomas Harman
- Headquarters: Redwood City, California, United States
- Products: Artificial Christmas trees, Wreaths and Garlands, Christmas Ornaments, Holiday Lighting, Fall and Halloween Decorations, Christmas Decorations, Artificial Flowers

Balsam Hill is a California-based online store specializing in artificial Christmas trees, Christmas accessories, artificial wreaths, and artificial flowers. Balsam Hill is known in the industry for producing realistic Christmas trees.

== History ==
The company was founded in 2006 by current CEO Thomas "Mac" Harman. In its first season, Balsam Hill's sales reached $2.9 million.

By 2016, the company's revenue had grown over $100 million, and it employed over 160 people. The company's growth was supported by increasing demand for artificial Christmas trees and accessories, sold through its website and TV shopping networks.

Balsam Hill holds a patent for its 'Flip Tree' technology, designed to simplify the assembly and disassembly of artificial trees. The company has been featured by designers, holiday enthusiasts, and on television shows, including appearances on the sets of Hallmark Channel movies.

In addition to artificial Christmas trees, Balsam Hill has expanded its product line to include holiday décor, wreaths, garlands, and seasonal home accessories. It also launched Balsam Hill Canada in 2024 to cater to the Canadian market, further extending its international presence. Balsam Hill also has a presence in other international markets, such as the UK, Australia, Germany, and France.

Balsam Hill operates a brick-and-mortar outlet store in Burlingame, California. In 2024, the company expanded its physical presence by opening Balsam Hill Studio in Lahaina, Hawaii, specifically catering to travelers.

== Media coverage ==
The Strategist by New York magazine included Balsam Hill in a list of recommended artificial Christmas trees, noting the brand's realistic designs and variety.

Additionally, The Daily Telegraph featured Balsam Hill's Nordmann Fir among the six best artificial Christmas trees for 2024, noting its realistic look and quality.
