= Club Bing =

Microsoft group of online games

Screenshot of Live Search Club prior to the rebrand to Bing.

Club Bing (previously Live Search Club) was a group of online word games by Microsoft that lasted from April 2007 to May 2012. Players who completed or partially completed a game earned "tickets" (originally up to 1000 per day, then later reduced to 500) that could be exchanged for Microsoft or other products. The site was credited with a significant increase in market share for the search engine Bing.

Club Bing had also opened up to allow users to send a percentage of tickets earned in a game to a charity or school of their choice. Many local charities, schools, and organizations are represented to users.

On February 15, 2012, Microsoft announced that Club Bing would close on May 31, 2012. Actual gameplay ended on May 15, 2012; prize redemption ended on May 31.

== Bing ==
While playing the games, players may request "hints" which consist of searches on the Bing search engine. Every time a player submits an answer (correct or incorrect) a search query is generated. The site had succeeded in helping increase the market share of Live Search from 8.4% in May 2007 to 13.2% in June.

== Games ==
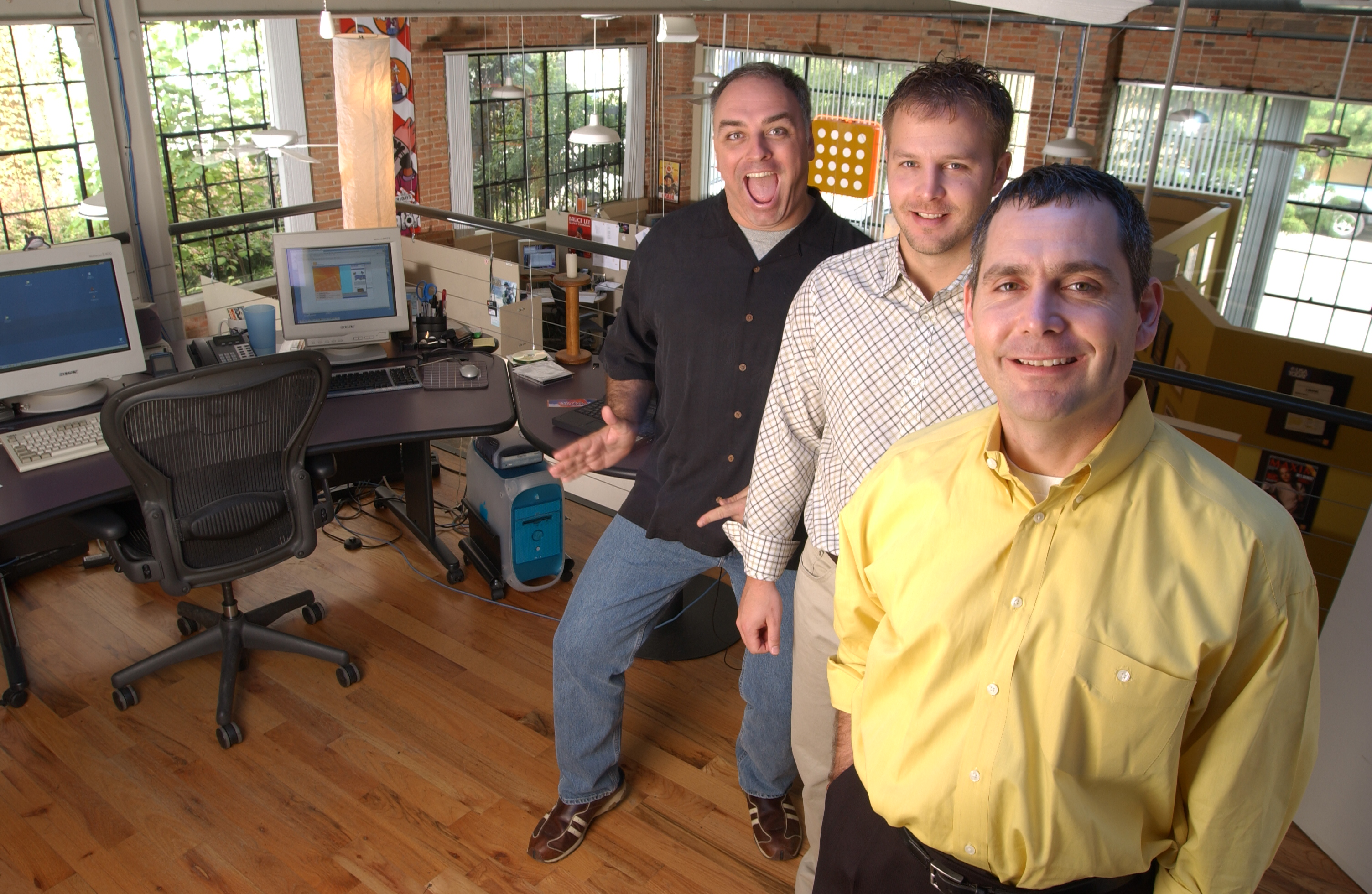
Blockdot original founders in their first office in 2002

Many of the games for Club Bing were built by Blockdot, a defunct branded entertainment and game studio based in Dallas, Texas, United States. In August 2005, it was purchased by Media General. By 2016, the company was no longer in business.

- Banana Shuffle — A game in which players transform one word to another by changing one letter at a time. (2 Tickets per complete game, max 622 Tickets)
- Chicktionary — Players are given seven letters from which to form words. A multiplayer option was recently added. (20 Tickets per complete single-player game, max about 34,700)
- Clink — A phrase-matching game. (10 Tickets per complete game)
- Coffee Break — Game sampler consisting of short versions of Chicktionary, Crosswire, and Clink. (20 Tickets per complete three-round game, max about 3,300 Tickets)
- CrossWire — A game in which items on one side must be matched to corresponding items on the opposite side. (20 Tickets per complete game, max about 41,000 Tickets)
- Dingbats — Players solve a puzzle and may guess letters, similar to Hangman. (3 Tickets per complete game, max 2,673 Tickets)
- Flexicon — A crossword-like game. (25 Tickets per complete game, max 63,500 Tickets)
- Quote a Pillar — A game in which players spell out famous quotes using the letters provided. (4 Tickets per complete game)
- Seekadoo — A word search game. (15 Tickets per complete game)
- Spelling Bee — Players are given seven letters from which to form words; similar to Chicktionary. (20 Tickets per complete game, max about 34,700)
- Taxi Wrangler — A time management game consisting of three rounds. (30 Tickets per complete game)
- Trivia Bound — A multiplayer trivia contest consisting of five rounds of questions. Players score points by inputting answers that rank the highest on a Bing search query.
- Word Slugger — Players are given seven letters from which to form words; similar to Chicktionary. (20 Tickets per complete game, max about 34,700)

== Prizes ==
Tickets earned in Club Bing games could be exchanged for prizes. Each reward was delivered within twelve weeks from the date redemption request is fully processed, unless stated otherwise. Prizes had to be earned by obtaining the required number of tickets. There was no option to purchase additional tickets. Tickets had no cash value. There was a limit of one item per household (based on account holder address) of each hardware and software product, and they could only be shipped in the United States. Microsoft did not charge users for the cost of shipping their prizes. Prizes were subject to change.

As part of Microsoft's Search and Give program, tickets earned in Club Bing could also be donated to schools, libraries, wildlife preserves, conservation initiatives, hospitals, museums, and charities.

== Exploitation ==
As with many online based promotions, there were ways to exploit the puzzles because the answers were easily solvable anagrams. Many users used automatic anagram solvers and manually inputted the answers. However, programmers quickly began making bots for Club Bing that automatically entered all of the anagrams to all of the puzzles. After Club Bing set daily limits, many of the programmers would create numerous accounts and max each of them out daily. The botters had a massive amount of success and soon many users were using automated programs instead of manually playing the games. Some notable bots were theBug, Nuke, ICHC, CBX, CLDL, and Chicken.

== See also ==
- MSN Games
