= Artificial Christmas tree =

Decorated tree made from synthetic materials

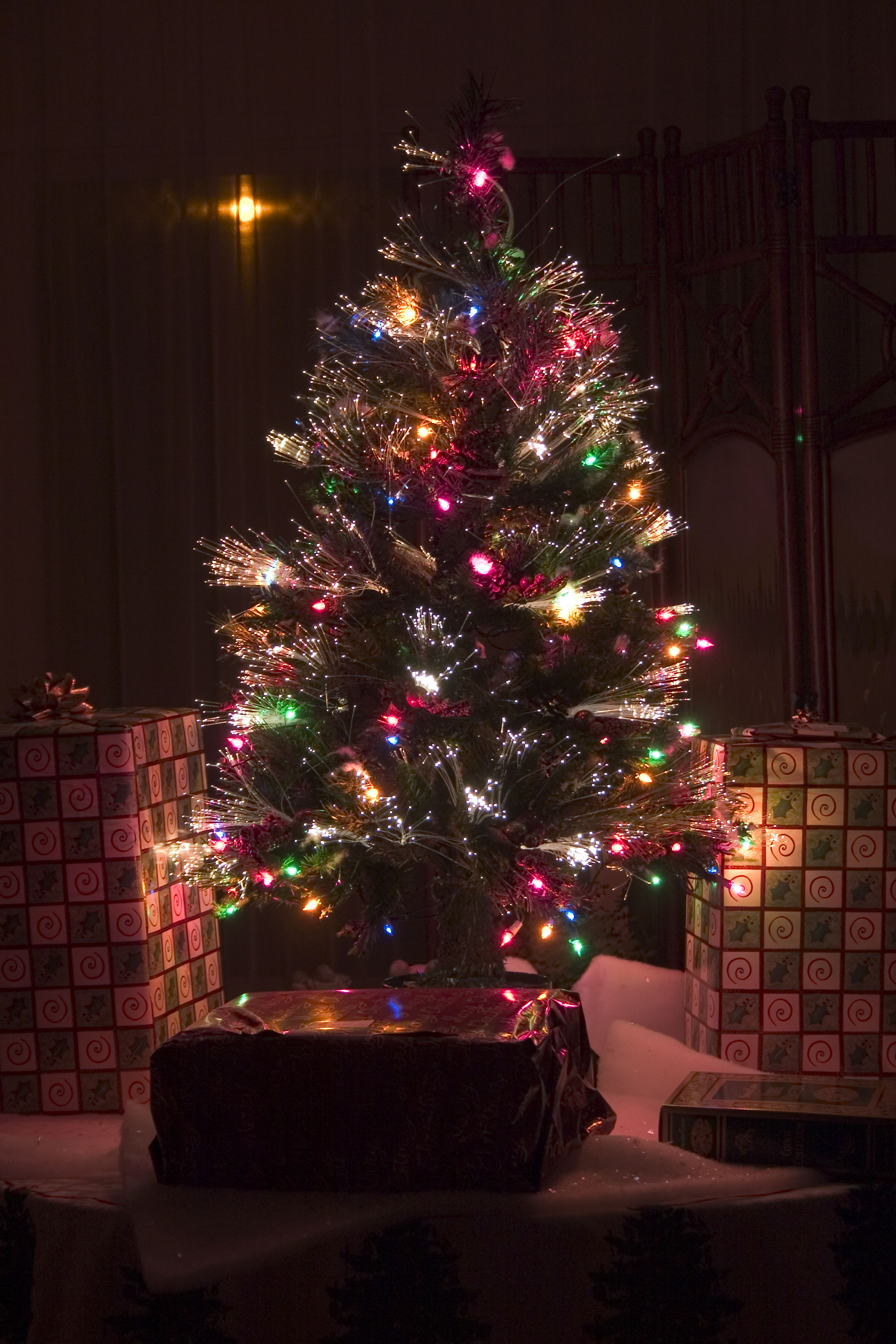
An artificial fiber optic Christmas tree

Artificial tree displayed at Palácio dos Bandeirantes in São Paulo.

An artificial or fake Christmas tree is an artificial pine or fir tree manufactured for the specific purpose of use as a Christmas tree. The earliest artificial Christmas trees were wooden, tree-shaped pyramids or feather trees, both developed by Germans. Most modern trees are made of polyvinyl chloride (PVC) but many other types of trees have been and are available, including aluminum Christmas trees and fiber-optic illuminated Christmas trees.

== History ==
The first artificial Christmas trees were developed in Germany during the 19th century, though earlier examples exist. These "trees" were made using goose feathers that were dyed green. The German feather trees were one response by Germans to continued deforestation in Germany.

Developed in the 1880s, the feather trees became increasingly popular during the early part of the 20th century. The German feather trees eventually made their way to the United States where they became rather popular as well. In fact, the use of natural Christmas trees in the United States was pre-dated by a type of artificial tree. These first trees were wooden, tree-shaped pyramids lit by candles. They were developed in Bethlehem, Pennsylvania, by the German Moravian Church in 1747.

== Types of artificial Christmas trees ==
=== Feathers ===
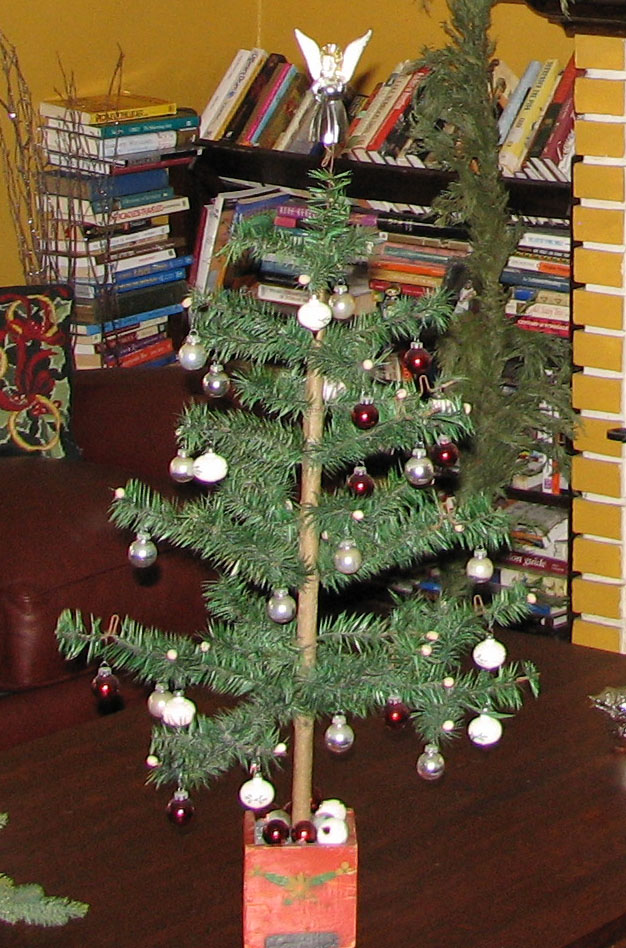
An example of an antique feather Christmas tree

Feather Christmas trees, originally of German origin, became popular in the United States as well. Feather trees were initially made of green-dyed goose feathers which were attached to wire branches. These wire branches were then wrapped around a central dowel which acted as the trunk Feather Christmas trees ranged widely in size, from a small 5-centimeter (2-inch) tree to a large 2.5-meter (98-inch) tree sold in department stores during the 1920s. Often, the tree branches were tipped with artificial red berries which acted as candle holders. The branches were widely spaced to keep the candles from starting a fire, which allowed ample space for ornamentation. Other benefits touted for feather trees included the elimination of a trip to the tree lot and the lack of shed needles.

In 1930 a British-based Addis Housewares Company created the first artificial Christmas tree made from brush bristles. The trees were made from the same animal-hair bristles used in toilet brushes, save they were dyed green.

=== Aluminum ===
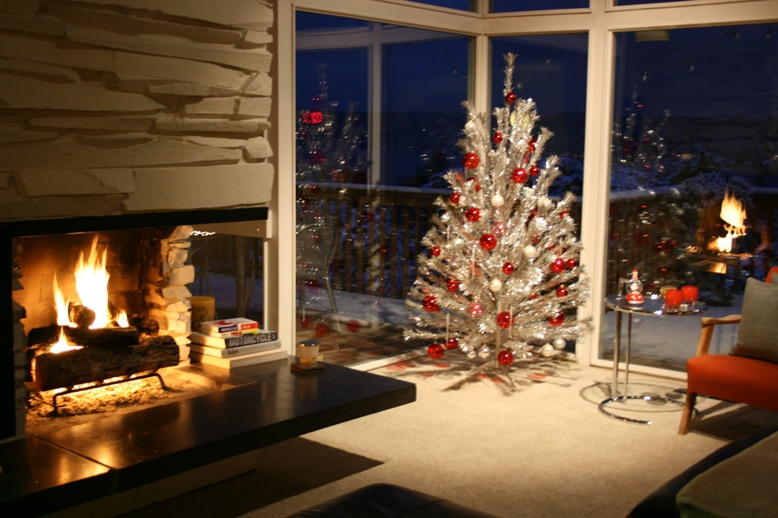
An aluminum Christmas tree

Aluminum trees were manufactured in the United States, first in Chicago in 1958, and later in Manitowoc, Wisconsin where the majority of the trees were produced. Aluminum trees were manufactured into the 1970s, and had their height of popularity from their inception until about 1965. That year A Charlie Brown Christmas aired for the first time, and its negative portrayal of aluminum Christmas trees is credited for a subsequent decline in sales.

=== Plastic ===
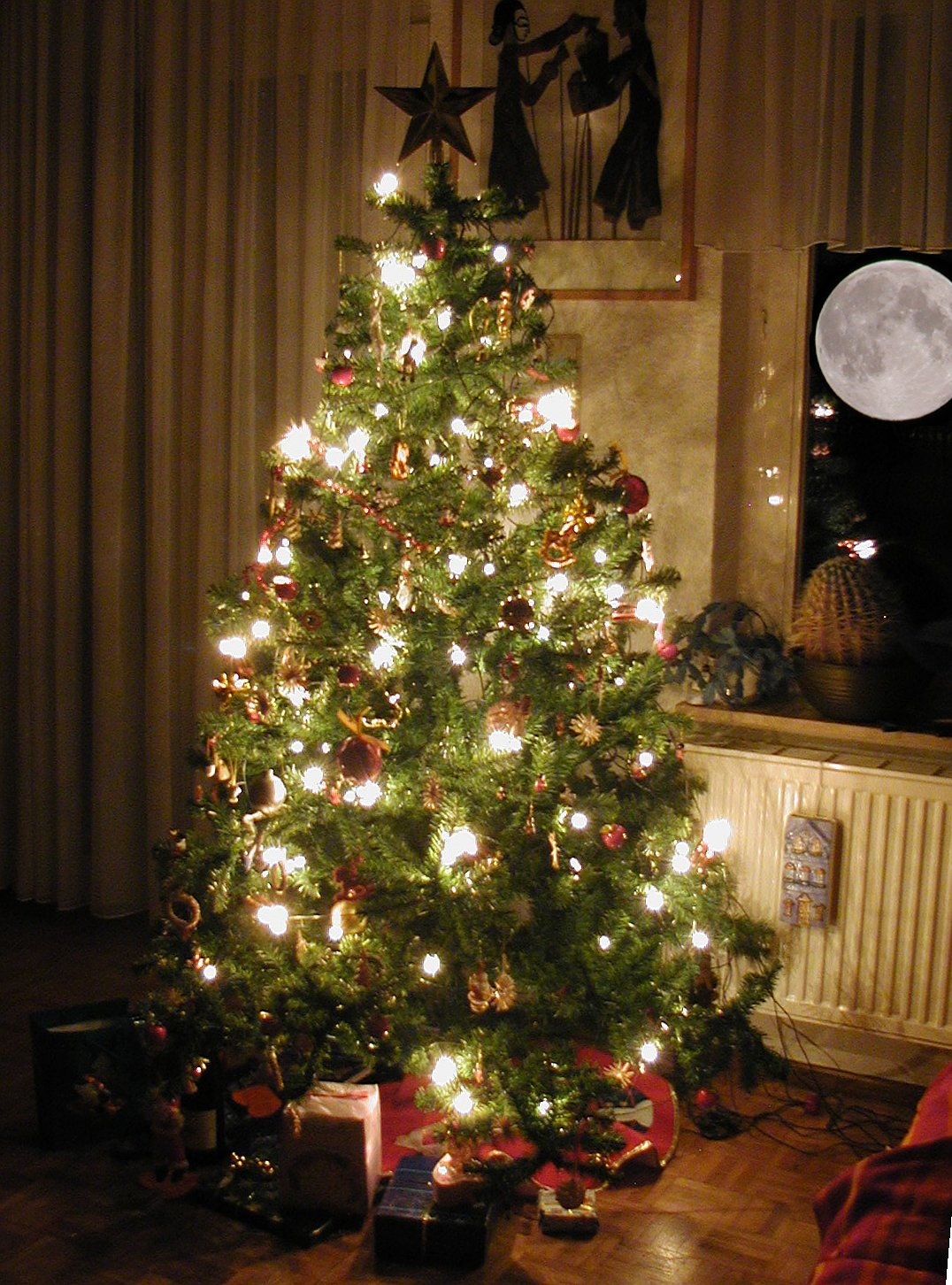
A PVC Christmas tree decorated with fairy lights and baubles

"Addis produced the trees applying the same technology used to produce toilet brushes, and in green to replicate the natural (pine needle) colour"...as post-war plastics took off, the bottle-brush tree trend became a hit.

The prelit tree has become increasingly popular in the United States and Germany as well, due to added ease of not having to string one's own lights. Types of lights popular today include incandescent lights (also referred to as "mini lights") and LED lights (where each bulb with its own socket, is wired in parallel, using twice the wire as series, but preventing the whole string from going out should one bulb burn out). Prelit trees are subject to the mandatory regulations for the safety standards of electrical products and have to meet safety standards approved by a nationally recognized testing laboratory such as UL (Underwriters Labs), CSA (Canadian Standards Association), ETL (Intertek), GS, BS and RoHS. Artificial Christmas trees may be "frosted" or "glittered" and designed for outdoor uses with UV additives. Plastic trees can come in a variety of different colors, and one type came with built-in speakers and an MP3 player.

Companies such as Mountain King, Barcana and the National Tree Company have marketed increasingly realistic PVC trees made to closely resemble Douglas fir, Ponderosa pine or other common types of Christmas trees. During the 1990s trees not only began to appear more realistic but some also smelled more realistic. Many of these more modern models come with pre-strung lights and hinged branches which simply had to be snapped into position. More recently, companies such as Christmas Tree World have begun to use polyethylene (PE) plastic molded from natural tree branches in an effort to create more realistic artificial Christmas trees.

=== Other ===
Trees with fiber-optic illumination come in two major varieties, one resembles a traditional Christmas tree and another type where the entire tree is made of wispy fiber optic cable, a tree composed entirely of light. David Gutshall, of Johnstown, Pennsylvania, received a patent for the latter type of fiber optic tree in 1998.

"Holographic mylar" trees in many hues is made.

Tree-shaped objects made from such materials as cardboard, glass, ceramic or other materials can be found in use as tabletop decorations.

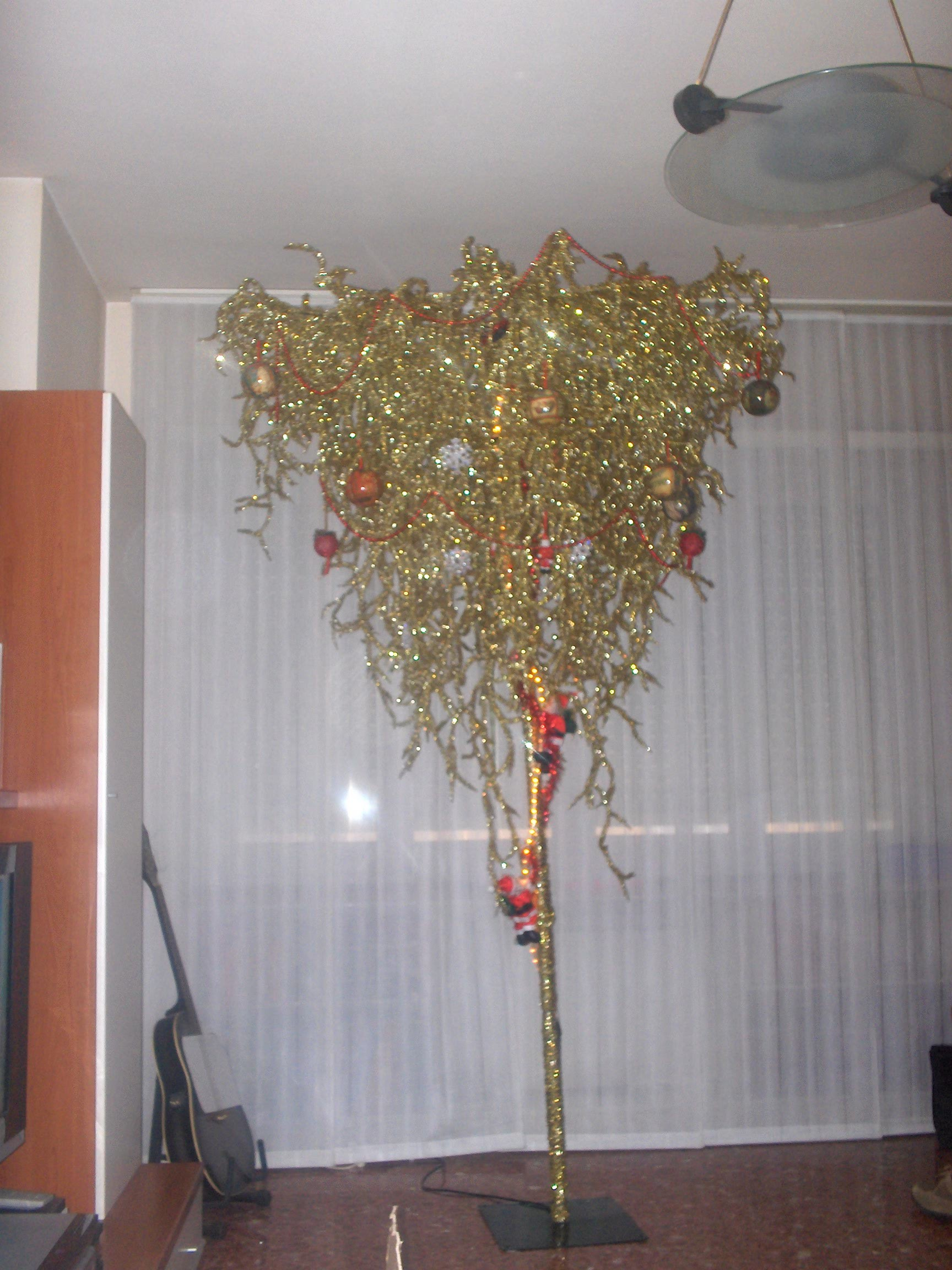
A stand-alone upside down Christmas tree

Upside-down artificial Christmas trees were originally introduced as a marketing gimmick; they allowed consumers to get closer to ornaments for sale in retail stores as well as opened up floor space for more products. There were three varieties of upside-down trees, those bolted to the ceiling, stand alone trees with a base, and half-trees bolted to walls.

== Culture ==
The tradition of putting up and decorating a Christmas tree is considered an iconic symbol of the holiday and has become a focal point in the homes of those who participate in Christmas festivities. It is a ritual activity that many have fond memories of and there is a nostalgia to having a real tree. However, there was a change from classic to modern and this change occurred when numerous other artifacts became plasticized. The culture of Christmas intersects with the culture of plastic, and so the artificial Christmas tree is born. Its popularity has grown since its invention, creating a new demand. "Reports cite a 34 percent drop in live tree sales the past decade, and a 30 percent rise last year alone in the sale of fake trees, to 9.6 million". A demand for plastic starts with economics: how cheap plastic objects are compared to their non-plastic counterpart. "...uncertain economic times ensure more Americans will be looking at Christmas trees as an investment...a single artificial Christmas tree costs 70 percent less than the purchase of ten real Christmas trees over the same period of time". All of this mixed with our convenience culture that enjoys the ease of new technologies; the artificial Christmas tree has blossomed into the holiday staple that it is today.

In 1992, in the United States, about 46 percent of homes displaying Christmas trees displayed an artificial tree. Twelve years later, a 2004 ABC News/The Washington Post poll revealed that 58 percent of U.S. residents used an artificial tree instead of a natural tree. The real versus artificial tree debate has been popular in mass media through the early 21st century. The debate is a frequent topic of news articles during the Christmas holiday season. Early 21st century coverage of the debate focused on the decrease in natural Christmas tree sales, and rise in artificial tree sales over the late 1990s and early 2000s.

The rise in popularity of artificial trees did not go unnoticed by the Christmas tree farming industry in the United States. In 2004, the U.S. Christmas tree industry hired the advertising agency Smith-Harroff to spearhead an ad campaign aimed at rejuvenating lagging sales of natural trees. A 1975 poll by Michigan State University showed the reasons why consumers were beginning to prefer artificial over natural Christmas trees. The reasons included safety, one-time purchasing, and environmental responsibility but the biggest reason respondents gave pollsters was no messy needle clean up.

== Production ==
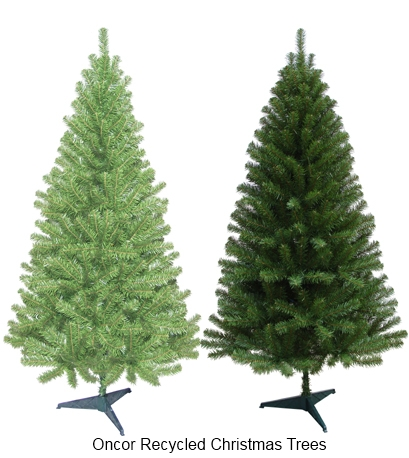
A typical 1.8-meter-tall (6 ft) recycled PVC Christmas tree made by Oncor

Most artificial Christmas trees are made from PVC plastic. PVC trees are fire-retardant but not fire-resistant. Many of these trees are made in China; from January to August 2005 $69 million worth of artificial trees from China entered the United States. Most artificial Christmas trees are manufactured in the Pearl River Delta area in China. Between January and September 2011, over $79.7 million worth of artificial Christmas trees were exported to the United States. The number of artificial Christmas trees imported to the United States rose to 139 million in the same nine-month period in 2012. Promoters of artificial trees highlight them as convenient, reusable, and of better quality than artificial trees of old. Supporters also note that some apartment buildings have banned natural trees because of fire concerns.

There is also a robust market for artificial Christmas trees in Poland. An estimated 20 percent of all Christmas trees sold in Poland are artificial, and many are made domestically by individual families. One producer from Koziegłówki stated that every other house was an artificial tree producer. The trees are made from a special film which is imported mostly from China or Thailand. Entire families take part in production and the trees are sold throughout Poland with some being exported to the Czech Republic and Slovakia. The main artificial Christmas tree producer in Poland is in Piła.

== Environmental issues ==
=== General issues ===
The debate about the environmental impact of artificial trees is ongoing. Generally, natural tree growers contend that artificial trees are more environmentally harmful than their natural counterpart. On the other side of the debate, trade groups such as the American Christmas Tree Association continue to refute that artificial trees are more harmful to the environment and maintain that the PVC used in Christmas trees has excellent recyclable properties. One researcher at Kansas State University called the idea that artificial trees are eco-friendly an "urban myth".

=== Lead contamination ===
In the past, lead was often used as a stabilizer in PVC, but it is now prohibited by Chinese laws. Most PVC materials for making artificial Christmas trees are now using tin as a stabilizer. PVC was used in some of the 2007 recalled Chinese toys. A 2004 study found that while in general artificial trees pose little health risk from lead contamination, there do exist "worst-case scenarios" where major health risks to young children are present. The lead author of the 2004 study, Richard Maas, noted in 2005: "We found that if we leave one of these trees standing for a week, and we wipe under the tree we'll find large amounts of lead dust in many cases under the tree".

In 2007, U.S. Senator Charles Schumer (D-NY) asked the Consumer Product Safety Commission to investigate lead levels in Chinese imported artificial trees. Lead-free artificial Christmas trees do exist; for example, one U.S.-based company uses barium instead of lead as a stabilizer in its PVC trees. A 2008 U.S. Environmental Protection Agency report found that as the PVC in artificial Christmas trees aged it began to degrade. The report determined that of the 50 million artificial trees in the United States approximately 20 million were 9 or more years old, the point where dangerous lead contamination levels are reached.

== See also ==
- Artificial plants
- "Attack of the Mutant Artificial Christmas Trees"
- Christmas tree production
- Sri Lankan Christmas tree, tallest artificial Christmas tree
